= Rupert Hamer (journalist) =

British journalist

- Born: 28 February 1970; East Anglia, England, United Kingdom
- Died: 9 January 2010 (aged 39); Nawa, Helmand Province, Afghanistan
- Occupation: Reporter
- Notable credit: Sunday Mirror

Rupert James Hamer (28 February 1970 – 9 January 2010) was a British journalist and, at the time of his death, was the defence correspondent for the Sunday Mirror.

== Career ==
Hamer was educated at Town Close School in Norwich and Gresham's School in Holt before joining the Eastern Daily Press as a trainee reporter in the late 1980s. In 1991 he attended Leeds University, where he studied politics, and edited a satirical column for the university's newspaper, the Leeds Student, entitled "Rupert Hamer on Friday". After graduating he worked as health correspondent for the Bournemouth Evening Echo, where he met his wife Helen, before moving to London in 1997. After working as a freelance for both the INS news agency and the Sunday Mirror, he accepted a staff job appointment by the newspaper in 1997. He was appointed as the Sunday Mirror's defence correspondent in 2004 reporting from both Afghanistan and Iraq.

== Death ==
Hamer and his Mirror colleague, photographer Philip Coburn, flew to Afghanistan on New Year's Eve 2009, where Hamer commenced his fifth assignment reporting from that country. They were to spend a month reporting from the war zone. In January 2010 Hamer and Coburn were embedded with the US Marine Corps in Afghanistan, when their vehicle hit an improvised explosive device (IED) near Nawa, in Afghanistan's Helmand province. Hamer was killed in the explosion along with US Marine Cpl. Mark Juarez. Five other Marines in the vehicle as well as colleague Coburn were seriously injured.

Coburn, who had worked with Hamer in several war zones, suffered severe leg injuries and was evacuated to the British military hospital at Camp Bastion in Helmand, to be flown back to the UK.

Hamer and Coburn were travelling in a Mine Resistant Ambush Protected vehicle (MRAP), the most advanced of all vehicles designed specifically to protect its passengers against explosions of mines and IEDs. One of Hamer's last assignments was a special Christmas edition of the Sunday Mirror with messages from loved ones, that was sent to soldiers three weeks before.

The explosion brought the number of journalists who had died in Afghanistan since 2001 at 18. This was the first time that a British reporter was killed in the conflict and Hamer was the first of them to die in a warzone since the death of ITN's Terry Lloyd in Iraq in 2003.

Hamer was honoured by US Marines of 1st Battalion, 3rd Marine Regiment, in a battlefield memorial ceremony at Forward Operating Base Geronimo in Nawa, Helmand Province, Afghanistan on 19 January.

== Personal life ==
Hamer had a wife and three young children at the time of his death.
