= Firebase Fiddler's Green =

Fire base in Afghanistan built by USMC

Fiddler's Green
- Nawa, Afghanistan
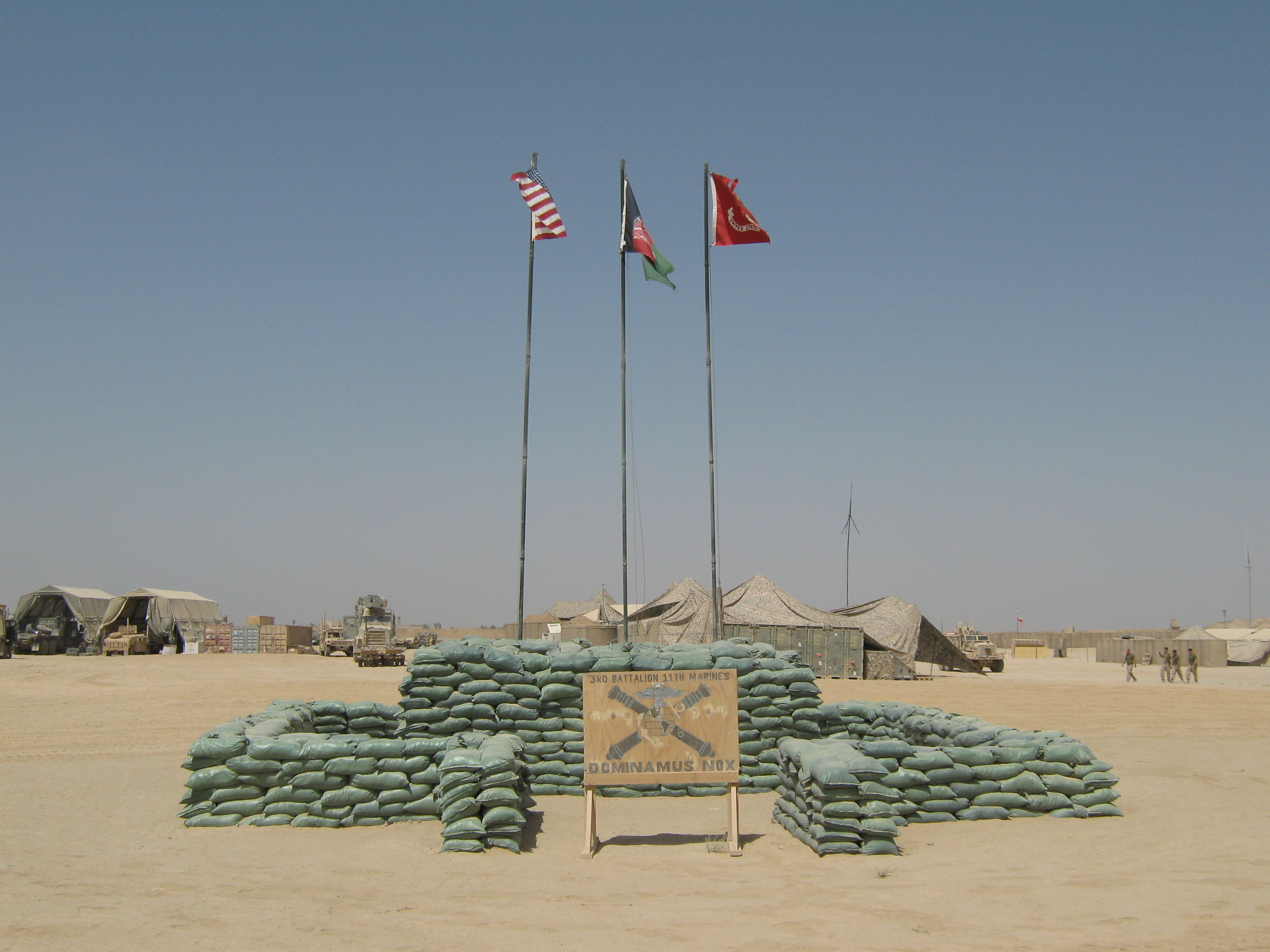
- Fiddler's Green in September 2009

Site information
- Type: Fire base
- Controlled by: Afghan Armed Forces

Site history
- Built: July 2009
- In use: 2009–2021

Fiddler's Green was an expeditionary fire base in Afghanistan built by the United States Marine Corps. It was located off Route 605 in Nawa-I-Barakzayi District of Helmand Province near the border with Pakistan at what the Marine Corps considered a "chokepoint to Taliban activity." It was originally built by the 3rd Battalion, 11th Marines in 2009 for Operation Strike of the Sword.

It was built on a flood plain, requiring Marine engineers to make improvements to the infrastructure.

== See also ==
- History of the United States Marine Corps
- Fiddler's Green
- List of United States Marine Corps installations
- List of ISAF installations in Afghanistan
