= Marine Corps Recruit Depot =

Marine Corps Recruit Depot may refer to:

- Marine Corps Recruit Depot Parris Island
- Marine Corps Recruit Depot San Diego

== See also ==
- List of United States Marine Corps installations
