= List of United States Marine Corps installations =

This is a list of installations used by the United States Marine Corps, organized by type and state. Most US states do not have active Marine Corps bases; however, many do have reserve bases and centers. In addition, the Marine Corps Security Force Regiment maintains Marines permanently at numerous naval installations across the United States and abroad. The Corps also shares its headquarters with the rest of the United States Armed Forces at the Pentagon in Virginia.

== United States ==
=== Marine Corps Bases and Air Stations ===
Insignia	Installation	Location	State	Coordinates
	Marine Corps Air Station Yuma	Yuma	Arizona	32°39′24″N 114°36′22″W
	Marine Corps Air Station Miramar	Miramar	California	32°52′04″N 117°08′30″W
	Marine Corps Base Camp Pendleton	Oceanside	California	33°20′00″N 117°25′00″W
	Marine Corps Air Station Camp Pendleton	Oceanside	California	33°18′04″N 117°21′19″W
	Marine Corps Air Ground Combat Center Twentynine Palms	Twentynine Palms	California	34°13′54″N 116°03′42″W
	Marine Corps Logistics Base Barstow	Barstow	California	34°51′17″N 116°56′24″W
	Marine Corps Recruit Depot San Diego	San Diego	California	32°44′31″N 117°11′50″W
	Mountain Warfare Training Center	Bridgeport	California	38°21′33″N 119°30′45″W
	Marine Corps Logistics Base Albany	Albany	Georgia	31°33′00″N 84°03′15″W
	Marine Corps Base Hawaii	Kāne'ohe Bay	Hawaii	21°26′37″N 157°44′56″W
	Marine Corps Air Station Kaneohe Bay	Kāne'ohe Bay	Hawaii	21°26′45″N 157°46′11″W
	1st Marine Corps District	Garden City	New York	40°43′47″N 73°36′51″W
	Marine Corps Air Station Cherry Point	Havelock	North Carolina	34°54′03″N 076°52′51″W
	Marine Corps Base Camp Lejeune	Jacksonville	North Carolina	34°35′00″N 77°20′00″W
	Marine Corps Air Station New River	Jacksonville	North Carolina	34°42′26″N 077°26′43″W
	Marine Corps Air Station Beaufort	Beaufort	South Carolina	32°28′38″N 080°43′23″W
	Marine Corps Recruit Depot Parris Island	Beaufort	South Carolina	32°20′22″N 80°41′24″W
	Marine Corps Base Quantico	Quantico	Virginia	38°33′4″N 77°25′50″W
	Henderson Hall	Arlington	Virginia	38°52′08″N 77°04′21″W
	Marine Barracks, Washington, D.C.	Washington, D.C.	Washington, D.C.	38°52′49″N 76°59′38″W

==== Satellite Bases and Aviation Facilities ====
Insignia	Installation	Host Facility	Location	State	Coordinates
	Blount Island Command	Marine Corps Logistics Base Albany	Jacksonville	Florida	30°24′22″N 81°31′18″W
	Camp H. M. Smith	Marine Corps Base Hawaii	ʻAiea	Hawaii	21°23′09″N 157°54′23″W
	Marine Corps Outlying Field Atlantic	Marine Corps Air Station Cherry Point	Atlantic	North Carolina	34°53′28″N 76°20′58″W
	Marine Corps Auxiliary Landing Field Bogue Field	Marine Corps Air Station Cherry Point	Bogue	North Carolina	34°41′26″N 077°01′47″W
	Marine Corps Outlying Field Camp Davis	Marine Corps Base Camp Lejeune	Holly Ridge	North Carolina	34°31′00″N 077°33′00″W
	Camp Geiger	Marine Corps Base Camp Lejeune	Jacksonville	North Carolina	34°43′59″N 77°27′16″W
	Camp Gilbert H. Johnson formerly known as "Montford Point"	Marine Corps Base Camp Lejeune	Jacksonville	North Carolina	34°44′09″N 77°24′26″W
	Courthouse Bay,	Marine Corps Base Camp Lejeune	Jacksonville	North Carolina	34°34′49″N 77°21′51″W
	Stone Bay	Marine Corps Base Camp Lejeune	Jacksonville	North Carolina	34°38′37″N 77°24′45″W
	Camp Elmore	Naval Station Norfolk	Norfolk	Virginia	36°55′42″N 76°17′38″W
	Marine Corps Air Facility Quantico	Marine Corps Base Quantico	Quantico	Virginia	38°30′13″N 077°18′18″W

=== Marine Corps Detachments ===
Insignia	Detachment	Host Facility	Location	State	Coordinates
	Marine Aviation Training Support Group 21	Naval Air Station Pensacola	Warrington	Florida	30°21′00″N 87°17′24″W
	Marine Aviation Training Support Group 22	Naval Air Station Corpus Christi	Corpus Christi	Texas	27°41′33″N 97°17′28″W
	Marine Aviation Training Support Group 23	Naval Air Station Pensacola	Warrington	Florida	30°21′00″N 87°17′24″W
	Marine Aviation Training Support Group 33	Naval Air Station Oceana	Virginia Beach	Virginia	36°49′14″N 76°02′00″W
	Marine Aviation Training Support Group 53	Naval Air Station Whidbey Island	Oak Harbor	Washington	48°21′07″N 122°39′21″W
	Marine Aviation Detachment	Naval Air Weapons Station China Lake	China Lake	California	35°41′08″N 117°41′31″W
	Marine Aviation Detachment	Naval Air Station Patuxent River	Patuxent River	Maryland	38°17′10″N 76°24′42″W
	Marine Corps Detachment	Fort Sill	Lawton	Oklahoma	34°40′16″N 98°23′23″W
	Marine Corps Detachment	Fort Huachuca	Huachuca City	Arizona	31°33′19″N 110°20′59″W
	Marine Corps Detachment	Defense Language Institute	Monterey	California	36°36′21″N 121°54′37″W
	Marine Corps Detachment	Corry Station Naval Technical Training Center	Pensacola	Florida	30°24′18″N 87°17′27″W
	Marine Corps Detachment	Fort Gordon	Augusta	Georgia	33°24′48″N 82°8′7″W
	Marine Corps Detachment	Fort Benning	Columbus	Georgia	32°21′58″N 84°58′09″W
	Marine Corps Detachment	Fort Knox	Louisville	Kentucky	37°55′12″N 85°57′36″W
	Marine Corps Detachment	Aberdeen Proving Ground	Aberdeen	Maryland	39°28′24″N 76°08′27″W
	Marine Corps Detachment	Fort Meade	Laurel	Maryland	39°6′25″N 76°44′35″W
	Marine Corps Detachment	Fort Leonard Wood	Waynesville	Missouri	37°44′24.36″N 92°07′34.59″W
	Marine Corps Detachment	Naval Station Newport; Naval War College	Newport	Rhode Island	41°31′20″N 71°18′32″W
	Marine Corps Detachment	Goodfellow Air Force Base	San Angelo	Texas	31°25′46.6716″N 100°23′56.54″W
	Marine Corps Detachment	Fort Lee	Tri-Cities	Virginia	37°14′06″N 77°19′58″W

=== Marine Corps Reserve ===
Insignia	Installation	Location	State	Coordinates
	Headquarters, Marine Forces Reserve, Naval Support Activity, New Orleans	New Orleans	Louisiana	29°57′00″N 90°01′45″W
	Marine Corps Individual Reserve Support Activity, Marine Forces Reserve	New Orleans	Louisiana	38°51′00″N 94°33′00″W
	Marine Corps Reserve Detachment, Naval Air Station Joint Reserve Base Fort Worth	Fort Worth	Texas	32°46′09″N 097°26′30″W

== US Territories ==
Insignia	Installation	Location	Territory
	Camp Blaz	Chaguin	Guam

== Overseas ==
Insignia	Installation	Location	Country	Coordinates
	Robertson Barracks	Darwin	Australia	12°26′42″S 130°58′28″E
	Marine Corps Detachment, Guantanamo Bay Naval Base	Guantánamo Bay	Cuba	19°54′00″N 75°9′00″W
	Marine Corps Security Detachment, Camp Lemonnier	Djibouti	Djibouti	11°32′37″N 43°08′55″E
	Headquarters, United States Marine Corps Forces, Europe (MARFOREUR), Panzer Kaserne	Böblingen	Germany	48°40′55″N 09°02′46″E
	Marine Corps Air Station Iwakuni	Iwakuni	Japan	34°08′42″N 132°14′39″E
	Marine Corps Base Camp Smedley D. Butler	Okinawa	Japan	26°17′51″N 127°46′59″E
	Camp Courtney, Marine Corps Base Camp Smedley D. Butler	Uruma, Okinawa	Japan	26°23′31″N 127°51′34″E
	Camp Foster, Marine Corps Base Camp Smedley D. Butler	Ginowan, Okinawa	Japan	26°18′5″N 127°46′47″E
	Camp Gonsalves, Marine Corps Base Camp Smedley D. Butler	Kunigami, Okinawa	Japan	26°41′20″N 128°13′45″E
	Camp Hansen, Marine Corps Base Camp Smedley D. Butler	Kin, Okinawa	Japan	26°27′38″N 127°54′54″E
	Camp Kinser, Marine Corps Base Camp Smedley D. Butler	Naha, Okinawa	Japan	26°15′09″N 127°41′51″E
	Camp Lester, Marine Corps Base Camp Smedley D. Butler	Chatan, Okinawa	Japan	26°18′58″N 127°45′46″E
	Camp McTureous, Marine Corps Base Camp Smedley D. Butler	Uruma, Okinawa	Japan	26°22′53″N 127°50′47″E
	Camp Schwab, Marine Corps Base Camp Smedley D. Butler	Uruma, Okinawa	Japan	26°31′29″N 128°02′40″E
	Marine Corps Air Station Futenma	Ginowan, Okinawa	Japan	26°16′15″N 127°44′53″E
	Marine Wing Liaison Kadena, Kadena Air Base	Kadena, Okinawa	Japan	26°21′06″N 127°46′10″E
	Camp Fuji	Gotemba, Shizuoka	Japan	35°19′14″N 138°52′07″E
	Camp Mujuk	Pohang	South Korea	35°57′36″N 129°25′34″E
	Camp Thunder Cove	Diego Garcia	British Indian Ocean Territory	07°17′27″S 72°23′09″E

== Closed/Converted ==
=== United States ===
Insignia	Installation	Date	Current Function	Location	State
	Marine Corps Barracks Adak	2004	Adak Airport	Adak	Alaska
	Marine Corps Air Facility Walnut Ridge	1945	Walnut Ridge Regional Airport	Walnut Ridge	Arkansas
	Camp Calvin B. Matthews	1964	University of California, San Diego	La Jolla	California
	Marine Corps Auxiliary Airfield Gillespie	1946	Gillespie Field	El Cajon	California
	Marine Corps Air Station El Centro	1946	Naval Air Facility El Centro	El Centro	California
	Marine Corps Air Station El Toro	1999	Orange County Great Park	Irvine	California
	Marine Corps Air Station Mojave	1961	Mojave Air and Space Port	Mojave	California
	Marine Corps Air Station Santa Barbara	1946	Santa Barbara Municipal Airport	Santa Barbara	California
	Marine Corps Air Station Tustin	1999	Tustin Legacy	Tustin	California
	Marine Barracks Jacksonville	1986	Naval Air Station Jacksonville	Jacksonville	Florida
	Marine Corps Air Station Miami	1959	Opa-locka Airport	Miami	Florida
	Marine Corps Air Station Ewa	1952	Naval Air Station Barbers Point	Oahu	Hawaii
	Marine Corps Air Station Edenton	c.1960	Northeastern Regional Airport	Edenton	North Carolina
	Marine Corps Air Station Eagle Mountain Lake	1946	private airport	Pecan Acres	Texas
	Marine Corps Outlying Field Greenville	c.1946	Pitt-Greenville Airport	Greenville	North Carolina
	Marine Corps Auxiliary Airfield Kinston	c.1946	Kinston Regional Jetport	Kinston	North Carolina
	Marine Corps Outlying Field New Bern	c.1946	Craven County Regional Airport	New Bern	North Carolina
	Marine Corps Auxiliary Airfield Corvallis	1944	Corvallis Municipal Airport	Corvallis	Oregon
	Marine Corps Auxiliary Airfield Congaree	1945	McEntire Joint National Guard Base	Eastover	South Carolina

=== Overseas ===
Insignia	Installation	Date	Location	Country
	Con Thien	1969	Vietnamese Demilitarized Zone	Vietnam
	Chu Lai	1970	Dung Quat Bay	Vietnam
	Marble Mountain Air Facility	1971	Marble Mountain	Vietnam
	Da Nang Air Base	1972	Da Nang	Vietnam
	Camp Carroll	1972	Cam Lo	Vietnam
	MCAS Rose Garden	1973	Nam Phong	Thailand
	Khe Sanh Combat Base	1975	Quảng Trị	Vietnam
	Ky Ha Air Facility		Ky Ha Peninsula (Quang Nam province, Nui Thanh District)	Vietnam
	Camp Monteith	2007	Gnjilane	Kosovo
	FOB Delhi	2012	Garmsir District	Afghanistan
	Patrol Base Jaker	2014	Nawa-I-Barakzayi District	Afghanistan
	FOB Geronimo	2014	Nawa-I-Barakzayi District	Afghanistan
	Camp Dwyer	2021	Garmsir District	Afghanistan
	Firebase Fiddler's Green	2021	Nawa-I-Barakzayi District	Afghanistan
	Kandahar International Airport	2021	Daman District	Afghanistan

== See also ==
- Marine Corps Installations Command
- Marine Corps Installations East
- Marine Corps Installations West
- List of United States Navy installations
- List of former United States Army installations
- List of United States Air Force installations
- List of United States Space Force installations
