= Patrol Base Jaker =

PB Jaker
- Nawa-I-Barakzayi District, Helmand Province Afghanistan
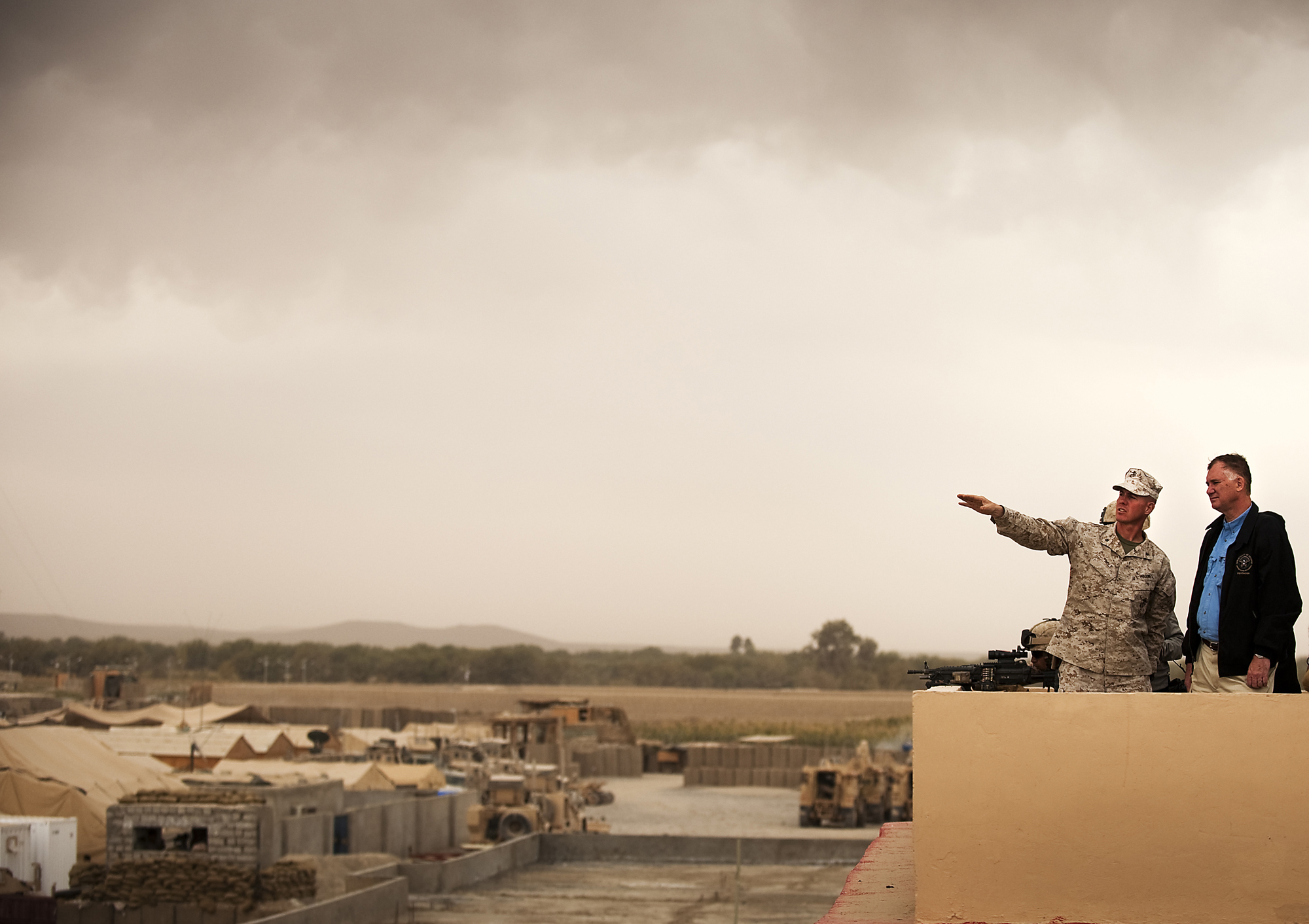
- Lt. Col. Jeffrey Holt with Deputy Secretary of Defense William Lynn on the roof of Patrol Base Jaker in 2010.

Site information
- Type: Combat Outpost
- Controlled by: United States Marine Corps

Site history
- Built: 2008
- In use: 2008 — 2014

Patrol Base Jaker in Afghanistan was a military expeditionary base used by the United States Marine Corps and British Army. It was in along the Helmand River Valley in Nawa-I-Barakzayi. It was originally built by the British Army of Task Force Helmand in 2008 and was formed from Hesco bastion units filled with sand and rubble; with little overhead cover.

In June 2009, it was transferred to the Marines of 2nd Marine Expeditionary Brigade. It was also the setting for the documentary film Patrol Base Jaker.

Units

- C Company, 1 RIFLES
- 1st Battalion 5th Marines
- 11th Marine Regiment Counterbattery RADAR Target Acquisition Platoon LCMR (CBR TAP LCMR) (2009)
- The Black Watch, 3rd Battalion, The Royal Regiment of Scotland (2009)
- 137 Bty, 40th Regiment Royal Artillery (The Lowland Gunners)
- 1st Battalion 3rd Marine Regiment Alpha Company (2009–2010)
- 3d Battalion 3d Marine Regiment Kilo Company (2010)
- 1st Battalion 9th Marines, Charlie Company (May–Dec 2011)
- 2nd Battalion 6th Marine Regiment, Golf Company (Dec 2011–June 2012)
- Police Mentor Team Mobile Unit (2011)
- 2d Battalion 3d Marine Regiment (November 2010–June 2011)
- Police Advisor Team NAWA (2012)

== See also ==
- History of the United States Marine Corps
- List of United States Marine Corps installations
- List of ISAF installations in Afghanistan
