= Shamalan =

Shamalan can refer to:

- M. Night Shyamalan
- Nawa-I-Barakzayi District in Afghanistan
