= Nawa-I-Barakzayi District =

- District
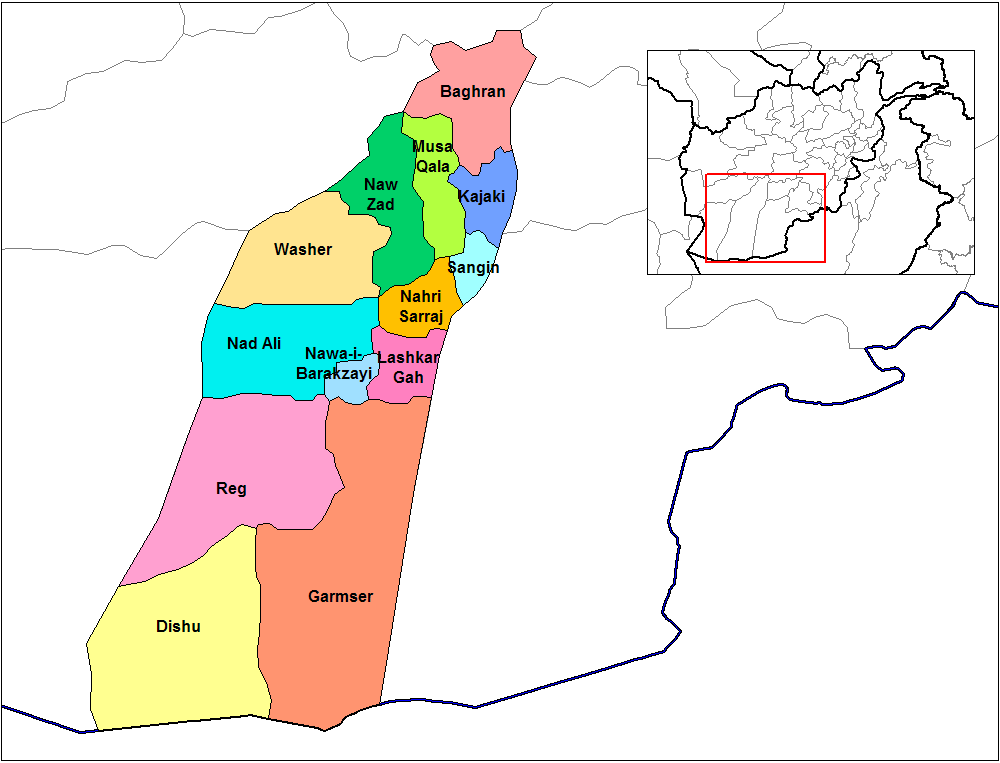
- The district in the map of Helmand Province
- Country: Afghanistan
- Region: Helmand Province
- Capital: Nāwa-I-Barakzāyi

Area
  - Total: 2,505 km^{2} (967 sq mi)

Population (2008)
  - Total: 89,814
  - Density: 35.85/km^{2} (92.86/sq mi)

Nāwa-I-Barakzāyi District (Pashto: ناوۀ بارکزائی) or Trek Nawa (Pashto: ټرېک نوا) is an administrative district in Helmand Province, Afghanistan located south of the provincial capital of Lashkar Gah along the Helmand River. It is bordered by the districts of Lashkar Gah, Nad Ali, Garmsir, and Rig, as well as the provinces of Nimruz and Kandahar. It falls within the area known as Pashtunistan, (land of the Pashtuns), an area comprising most of southeast Afghanistan and northwest Pakistan. The dominant language is Pashto and many of the 89,000 residents practice the traditional code of Pashtunwali. Nawa-I-Barakzayi's name reflects the dominant Pashtun tribe in the district, the Barakzai. Prior to the 1970s, it was called Shamalan after a small village at the south end of the district.

It is one of the top opium-producing districts in Afghanistan with 6% of Afghanistan's total crop being grown there. This has made the Nawa-i-Barakzayi district a central hub in the opium and heroin trade. The district has also been the scene of heavy fighting during the Helmand province campaign. It was a Taliban stronghold until the summer of 2009, when United States Marines were deployed there as part of Operation Strike of the Sword. In January 2010 ISAF chief Stanley McChrystal and the country's prime minister Hamid Karzai visited the district to assess the ISAF's work in combating the insurgents. Nawa previously fell to the Taliban in early August 2016, but Afghan forces reentered the district center in mid-August, making the district contested. In October 2016, Taliban has seized control of the district and killed the Ahmadshah Salem, the district's chief of police.

== History ==
=== Pre-Modern History ===
Nawa-I-Barakzayi is located on a flood plain that had been farmed for centuries, with farmers taking water from the river via locally built canals. In the 1950s and 1960s the United States sponsored the Helmand Valley Authority, a desert reclamation project to help turn parts of the Helmand River Valley into fertile farmland. In Nawa, the Shamalan canal, a branch of the Boghra canal, was built by the Helmand Valley Authority. It replaced the old system, increased the water supply, improved water distribution and brought new lands under irrigation. Additional irrigation in the 1970s brought more water into the southern reaches of Nawa, more land under cultivation, and allowed new land settlement.

=== Afghan Civil War ===
In 1978 the People's Democratic Party of Afghanistan seized control of the government and began a program of rapid modernization. Among the many institutions they targeted were the local landlords, known as the khans. In Helmand Province groups of local warlords and armed resistance fighters quickly rose in opposition to the government and filled the power vacuum left by the khans. Most resistance in Helmand was carried out on tribal lines; without a significant tribal base, Nawa-i-Barakzayi became a major government stronghold. During the Soviet occupation, the Afghan Communists recruited many of their Khalq militia from Nawa-i-Barakzayi. The Russians also had a major operations base near Lashkar Gah with at least 2500 soldiers, including the 22nd Spetznaz Brigade. The main Russian strategy in central Helmand was to cut a deal with the main mujahideen commander, Mullah Mohammad Nasim Akhundzada which divided the province into the Soviet areas (Lashkar Gah and Gereshk) and the mujahideen areas (everywhere else). After repeatedly taking indirect fire from mujahideen units operating in the Nawa area, the Soviets launched a clearing operation there in 1987 and set up a Sarandoy (Armed Police) Battalion. According to the local residents, over 20% of their homes were destroyed during the Soviet occupation.

The Soviet occupation also saw the rise of poppy growing in Nawa District. During the Eighties the Akhundzadas gradually consolidated power over most of Helmand, eliminating other Mujahideen factions. Two prominent pro-government commanders in the Nawa area during this time were Khano and Allah Noor. Allah Noor was actually a native of Nawa-i-Barakzayi (Khano was from Farah Province); both individuals recruited their militias from unemployed youths in the province. After the Soviet withdrawal, they administered the area for the Afghan government until they were overrun by the Akhundzadas in 1993. The Akhundzada victory was short-lived, however, as the Taliban conquered Nawa-i-Barakzayi along with rest of Helmand in late 1994 and early 1995.

=== Operation Enduring Freedom (2000–2010) ===
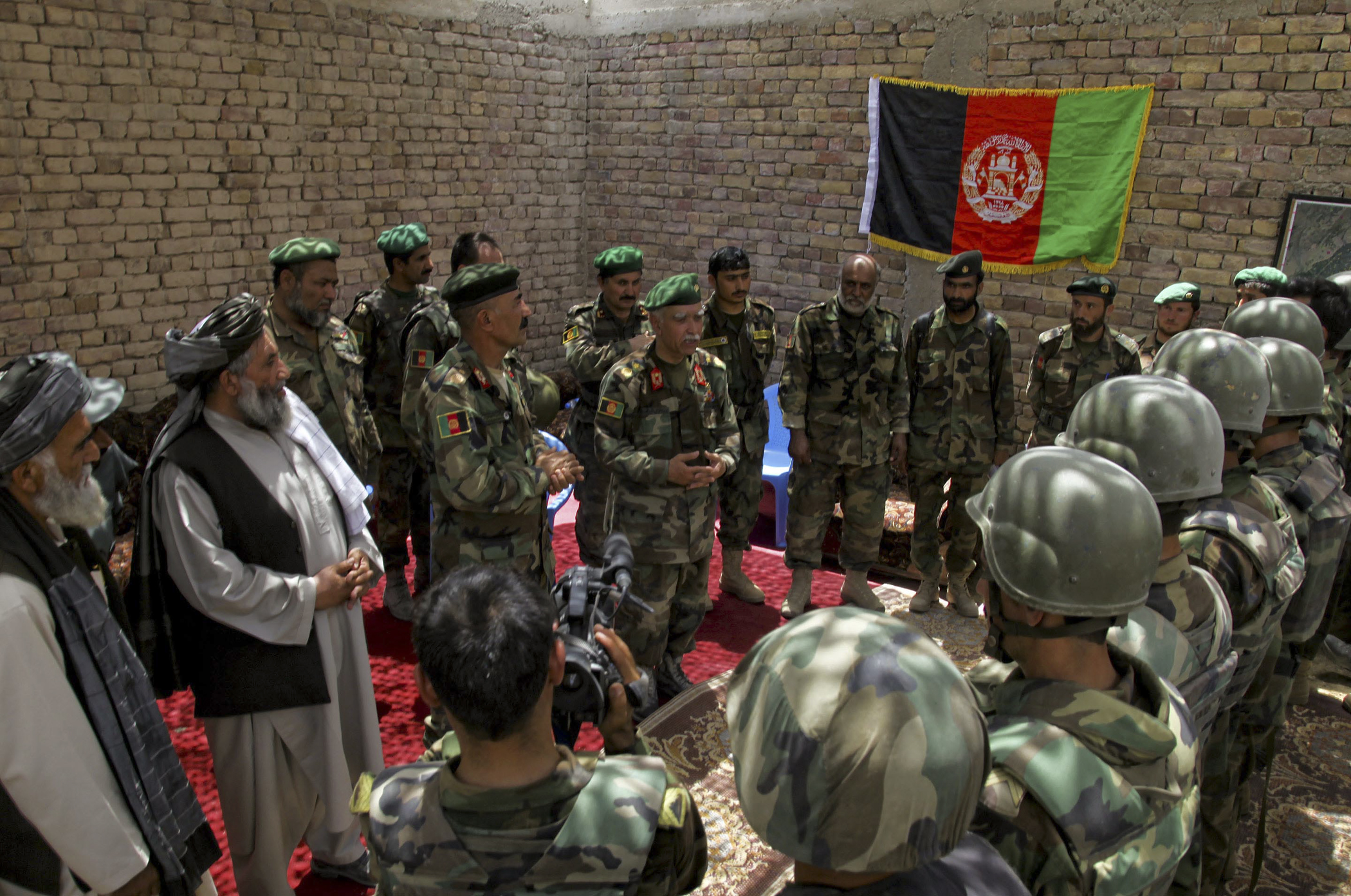
Afghan National Army Brig. Gen. Sheer Mohammad Zazi speaks to Afghan National Army soldiers and local Nawa District officials at Patrol Base Jaker.

In July 2006 the Taliban chased out the police and seized control of the town of Nawa-I-Barakzayi. They held it for two weeks before being driven out by NATO and Afghan soldiers. In 2007, Nawa was described as "relatively peaceful". In 2008 the Taliban launched their spring offensive, Operation Ebrat, aimed at isolating Lashkar Gah, using Nawa-i-Barakzayi as a staging area for men and equipment coming north from Garmsir. In October 2008 the British launched a series of unsuccessful sweeps aimed at driving the Taliban out of Nawa. That same year there was one Afghan NGO working on an irrigation intake off the Helmand River with some 700 men and vehicles at work.

In 2009 the Taliban began moving even more men into Nawa, possibly for additional attacks against Lashkar Gah. On May 13, they launched an attack against the Afghan National Police in the district, that overwhelmed several posts. By late spring they had established a solid foothold in the district. On July 2, 2009, Marines from the 1st Battalion, 5th Marines (1/5) occupied the district as part of Operation Strike of the Sword. They set up their headquarters in Forward Operating Base Geronimo. On August 26, Lance Corporal Donald Hogan, a Marine with 1/5, threw himself in front of an improvised explosive device (IED), saving the Marines in his squad. He was later posthumously awarded the Navy Cross for his actions.

On October 20, 2009, Lance Corporal David R. Baker with 1st Battalion, 5th Marine Regiment was killed by an IED in the district.

On November 10, 2009, Corporal Justin J. Swanson with 1st Battalion, 5th Marine Regiment was killed by an IED in the district.

In November 2009, 1/5 was replaced by 1st Battalion, 3rd Marines. In the late summer and early fall the Marines detained Haji Adam, one of Nawa's main drug lords, and turned his house into Combat Outpost (COP) Sullivan. In November two local officials were assassinated. On December 17, 2009, Admiral Mike Mullen, the Chairman of the Joint Chiefs of Staff, visited Patrol Base Jaker and touted the security gains by touring the Nawa district center without wearing body armor. Several weeks later Afghan President Hamid Karzai and ISAF commander General Stanley McChrystal also visited Nawa on January 2, 2010.

On January 9, 2010, British journalist Rupert Hamer and Lance Corporal Mark D Juarez of 1st Battalion 3rd Marines were killed by an IED in the district.

On January 10, 2010, Lance Corporal Jacob A. Meinert with 1st Battalion 3rd Marine Regiment, Bravo Company was killed in action in Nawa, Afghanistan.

On January 24, 2010, Lance Corporal Timothy J. Poole Jr. with 1st Battalion 3rd Marine Regiment, Bravo Company was killed in action during a patrol in Nawa, Afghanistan.

On February 16, 2010, Lance Cpl. Noah M. Pier, assigned to the 1st Battalion, 3rd Marine Regiment, 3rd Marine Division, III Marine Expeditionary Force, Kaneohe Bay, Hawaii; died while supporting combat operations in Nawa, Afghanistan.

On April 2, 2010, Lance Cpl. Curtis M. Swenson with 1st Battalion 3rd Marines, was killed after a Humvee in which Swenson was riding hit a roadside bomb that flipped the vehicle in Nawa, Afghanistan.

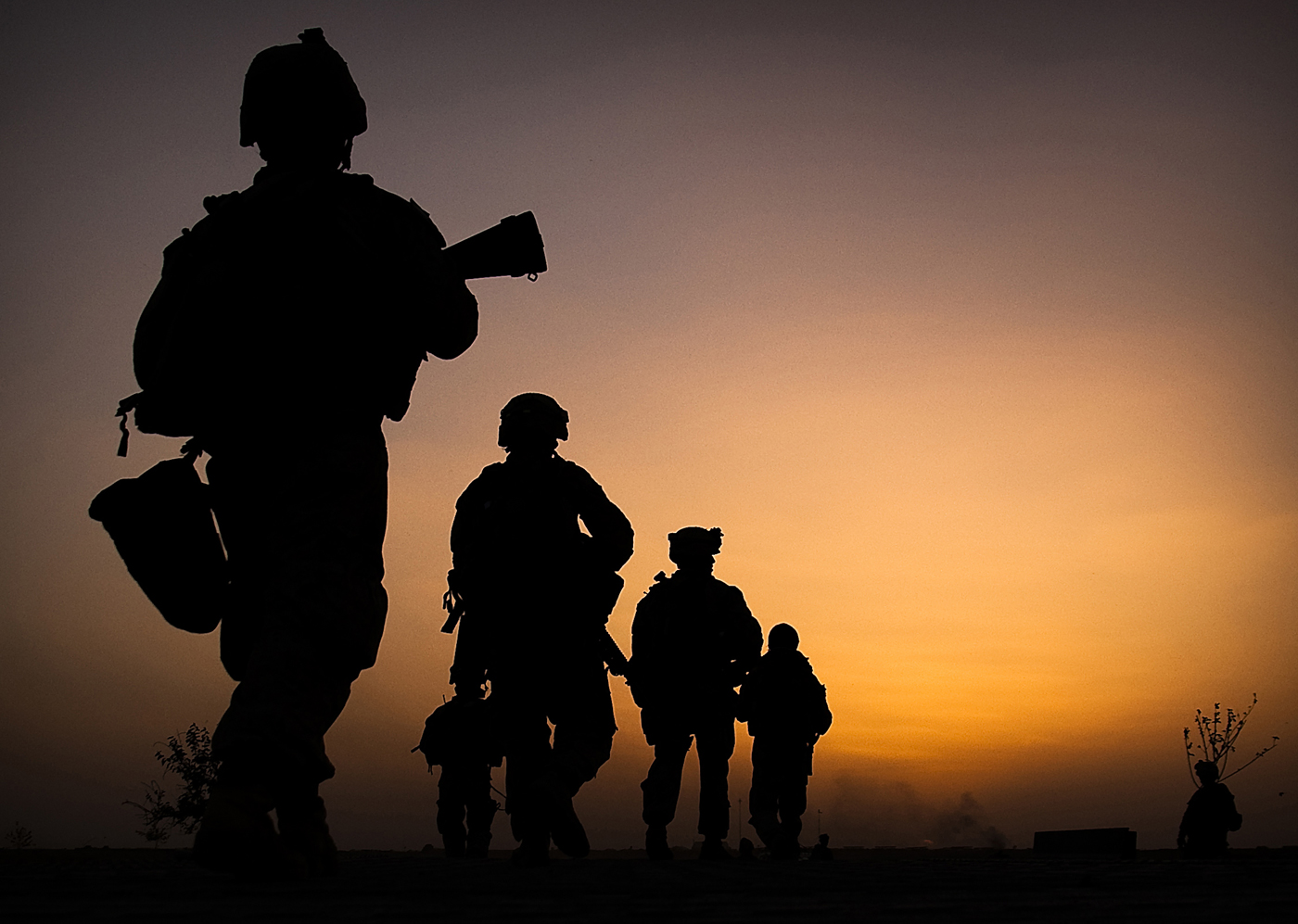
Marines from Headquarters & Service Company, 3rd Battalion 3rd Marines, conducting a dawn patrol in Nawa District.

=== Operation Strike of the Sword (2009) ===
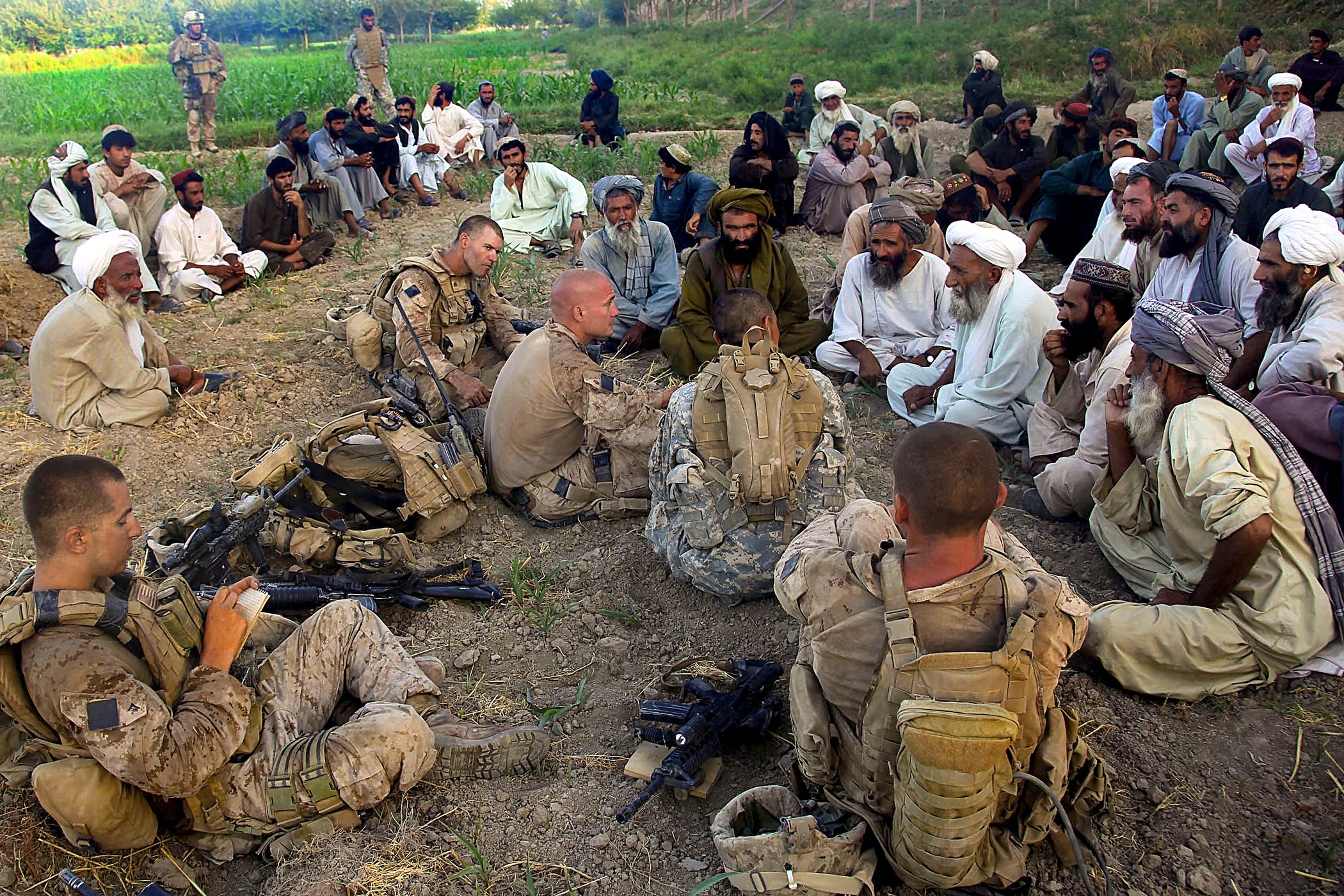
Marines from 1st Battalion, 5th Marine Regiment talk with leaders at a meeting in the Nawa District during Operation Strike of the Sword.

By the spring of 2009 Helmand was perceived as being one of the key centers of the Taliban movement. By early June 2009 over 10,000 Marines had poured into southern Afghanistan, the first wave of what President Obama promised would be a 21,000 strong surge. The Marines planned a series of operations to assault Taliban strongholds and then consolidate the Afghan government's position in the region. The first was Operation Strike of the Sword, which would target Taliban positions in Nawa-i-Barakzayi and Garmsir. According to Marine Brigadier General Larry Nicholson, the operation was aimed to improve security ahead of presidential elections, allowing voter registration where before there was none. The BBC said that while that was the official goal of the operation, the real goal was the change the momentum of the war, which had previously favored the Taliban, and create the perception that security in Afghanistan was improving.

On July 2, hundreds of Marines from 1st Battalion, 5th Marines were lifted by helicopter into the district, encountering sporadic resistance. The conflict began around 1:00 am local time when Marines were dropped by CH-47s and UH-60s helicopters of the 82nd Airborne Division, into dirt fields around the district capital of Nawa-I-Barakzayi. The first shots of the operation were fired at daybreak (around 6:15 am) when a Marine unit received small-arms fire from a tree-line. Cobra attack helicopters were called in and made strafing runs at the tree line from where the fire was coming from. Marines also encountered a group of about 20 militants holed up in a mud-brick compound. The Marines refrained from calling in a fixed-wing airstrike and instead used the 20mm guns from their AH-1W SuperCobra helicopter gunships to avoid the risk of civilian casualties. The militants managed to escape. Taliban forces withdrew to Marjah while observing the Marines.

=== Operation Enduring Freedom (2010–2014) ===
In mid-May 2010 1st Battalion 3rd Battalion was substituted by 3rd Battalion, 3rd Marines. Partnering with Afghan National Army soldiers from the 215th Corps, the battalion found itself in an area awash with money as the U.S. Agency for International Development was in the process of spending $30 million in an attempt to increase agricultural production (and create jobs for thousands of otherwise-potential Taliban recruits), but was also resulting in tensions between the local community council and tribal elders. In-mid June, Lima Company took part in Operation New Dawn, establishing observation posts in southern Shorshork, an area in between Nawa and Marjeh. In late July, the battalion suffered the loss of Corporal Joe Wrighstman, who drowned in the Helmand River while attempting to save the life of an Afghan National policeman. Just days later they had to secure the crash site of Dealer 54, an HMLA-369 helicopter which had crashed near Lashkar Gah, killing the two pilots. Around this time, India Company conducted Operation Thresher and later Operation Mako in areas of Nawa District under heavy Taliban influence, finding several cache sites and taking some detainees. In September, while providing pre-election security for the Afghan parliamentary elections the battalion suffered another loss when 1st Lieutenant Scott Fleming was shot and killed. Nevertheless, on election day Nawa District was the one location in Helmand Province with no reported Taliban attacks. Residents claimed that the Marines from 3rd Battalion had implemented good security measures and encouraged the people to cooperate with the government, preventing the Taliban from firing a single shot. By the end of 3rd Battalion's deployment in the fall of 2010, Nawa was regarded by many as "a model of counterinsurgency operations and the most stable district" in southern Afghanistan. The success of 3rd Battalion, 3rd Marines redirected OEF's focus to the hostile Nawa-I-Barakzayi District and the city of Marjah.

== Economics ==
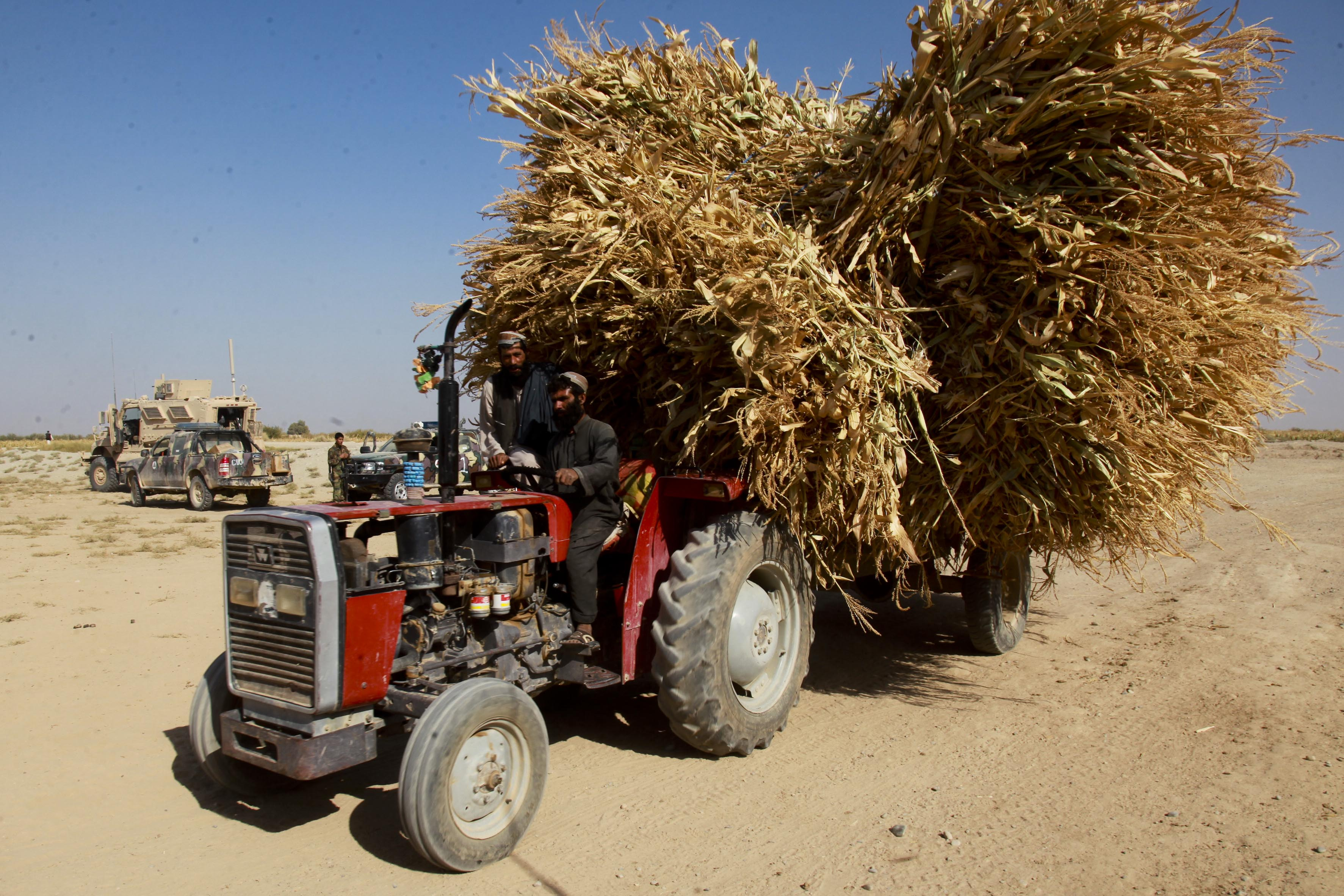
An Afghan farmer passes through a vehicle checkpoint.

Mujahideen commander Mullah Mohammad Nasim Akhundzada, based in Musa Qala in the north, first issued a fatwa legalizing poppy cultivation in Helmand Province in 1981. After their victory over government forces, the Akhundzadas turned Nawa-I-Barakzayi into one of Afghanistan's top opium-producing areas: in 1994 farmers in the district cultivated an estimated 6,074 hectares of poppy, or 8.5% of Afghanistan's total. Under Taliban rule, Nawa-I-Barakzayi's opium production plummeted to as low as 505 hectares in 1996, although it would steadily increase throughout the late Nineties. With the resurgence of the Taliban in 2005/2006, opium cultivation would explode in the district, hitting 10,168 hectares of poppy (or 6% of Afghanistan's total). Only Nad-i-Ali and Nahri Sarraj districts had higher levels. This has made the Nawa-i-Barakzayi district a central hub in the opium and heroin trade. One local dealer allegedly moved his poppy to heroin-producing labs as far away as Badakhshan and Takhar Provinces.

== Climate and Geography ==
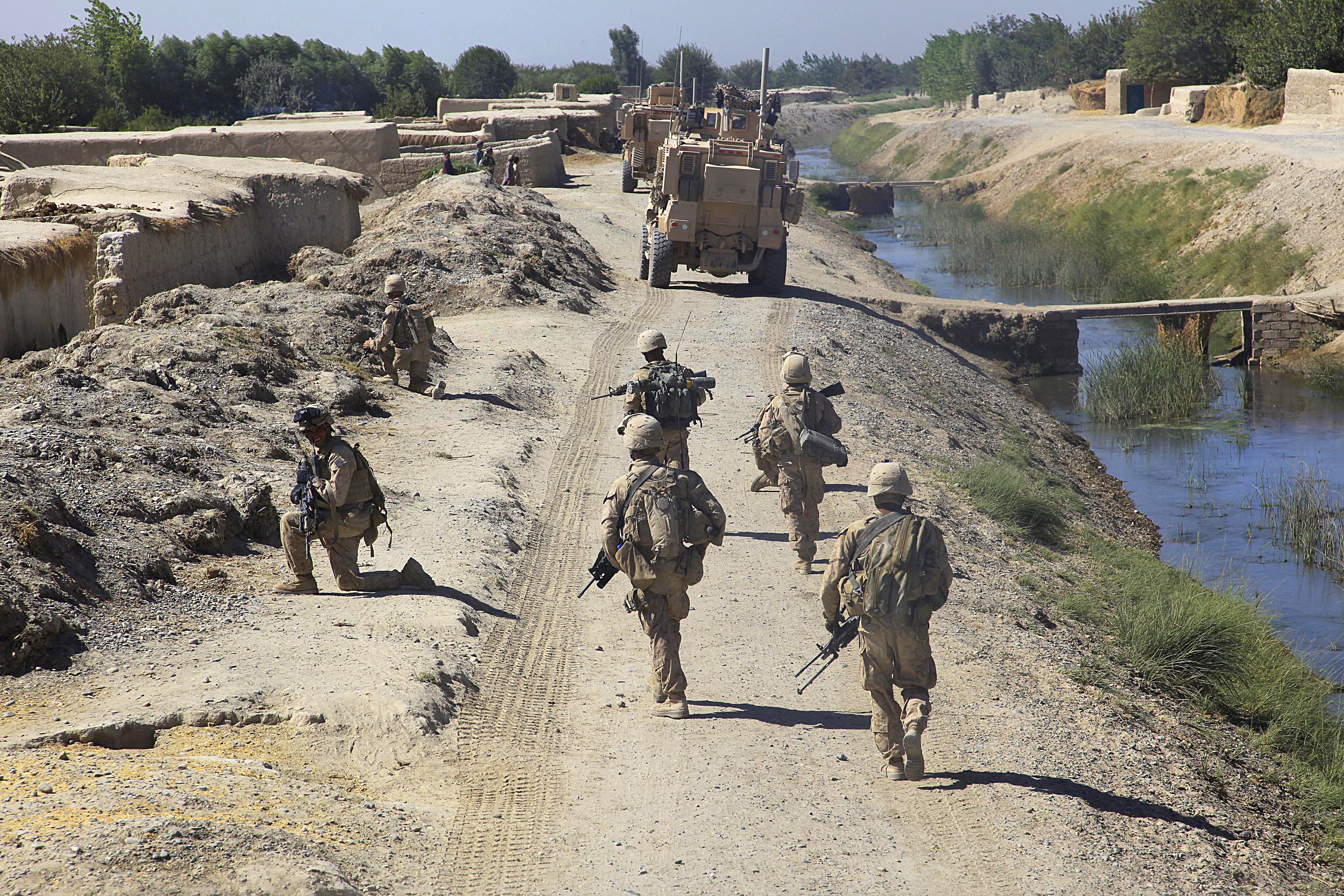
Marines patrolling along one of the canals in Nawa-i-Barakzayi.

Nawa-i-Barakzayi is located in the southwestern part of Afghanistan, which consists mainly of desert or semidesert land. The region is crossed by the Helmand River, which flows from the Hindu Kush to the Sistan Basin in Iran. The basin has several slightly salty lakes and marshes. Barley, corn, fruits, wheat, and poppy are grown in the Helmand Valley. Temperatures in Nawa-i-Barakzayi average about 46F in January and about 92F in July. The average annual precipitation ranges from 0 to 0.8 inches. Very little snow falls in the region.

Climate data for Nawa-i-Barakzayi, Afghanistan
Month	Jan	Feb	Mar	Apr	May	Jun	Jul	Aug	Sep	Oct	Nov	Dec	Year
Record high °F (°C)	84 (29)	87 (31)	94 (34)	103 (39)	115 (46)	116 (47)	122 (50)	114 (46)	109 (43)	99 (37)	90 (32)	78 (26)	122 (50)
Mean daily maximum °F (°C)	53 (12)	58 (14)	68 (20)	83 (28)	92 (33)	101 (38)	103 (39)	100 (38)	91 (33)	81 (27)	69 (21)	59 (15)	80 (27)
Mean daily minimum °F (°C)	39 (4)	42 (6)	51 (11)	62 (17)	70 (21)	77 (25)	82 (28)	78 (26)	68 (20)	55 (13)	45 (7)	41 (5)	59 (15)
Record low °F (°C)	5 (−15)	18 (−8)	28 (−2)	32 (0)	44 (7)	59 (15)	63 (17)	50 (10)	43 (6)	30 (−1)	17 (−8)	11 (−12)	5 (−15)
Average precipitation inches (mm)	0.4 (10)	0.8 (20)	0.8 (20)	0.7 (18)	0.2 (5.1)	0 (0)	0 (0)	0 (0)	0 (0)	0 (0)	0.1 (2.5)	0.6 (15)	3.6 (90.6)

== Demographics ==
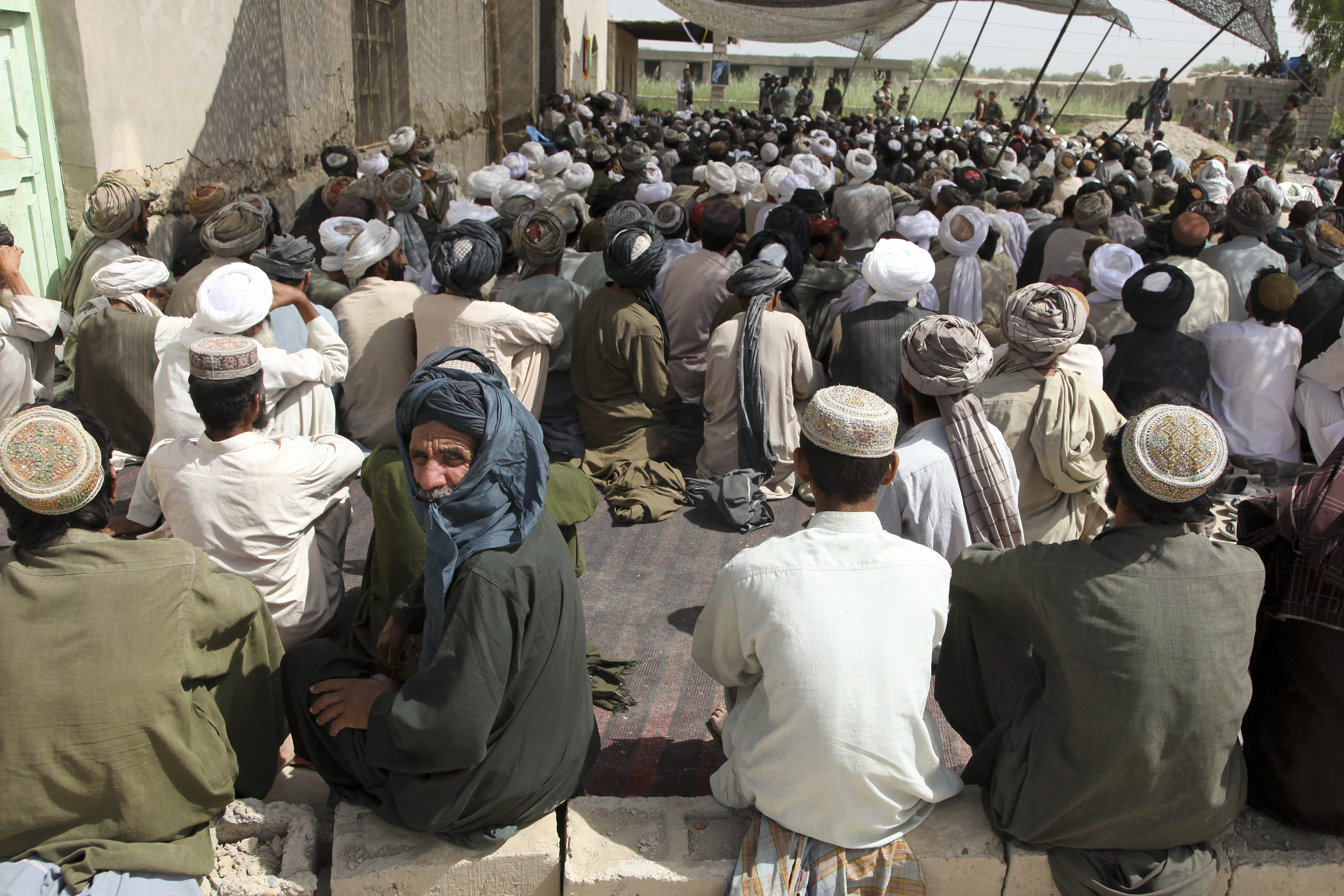
Afghan men attend a shura in the Nawa District.

Nawa-I-Barakzayi's name reflects the dominant Pashtun tribe in the district, the Barakzai. There is also a large minority of tribesmen from the Noorzai Tribe. Prior to the 1970s, it was called Shamalan after a small village at the south end of the district. As a result of land settlement, by 1975 there were 16 other tribes and ethnic groups in the area. The villages are located along the rivers, where irrigation is possible. Drought has affected this district since the late 20th century, reducing the number of livestock that can be sustained. A 2003 UN census recorded a population of 66,263 but a 2008 Afghan government survey counted 89,814 people. Most of the inhabitants are Pashtun. The district center is also called Nawa-I-Barakzayi.

== Government ==
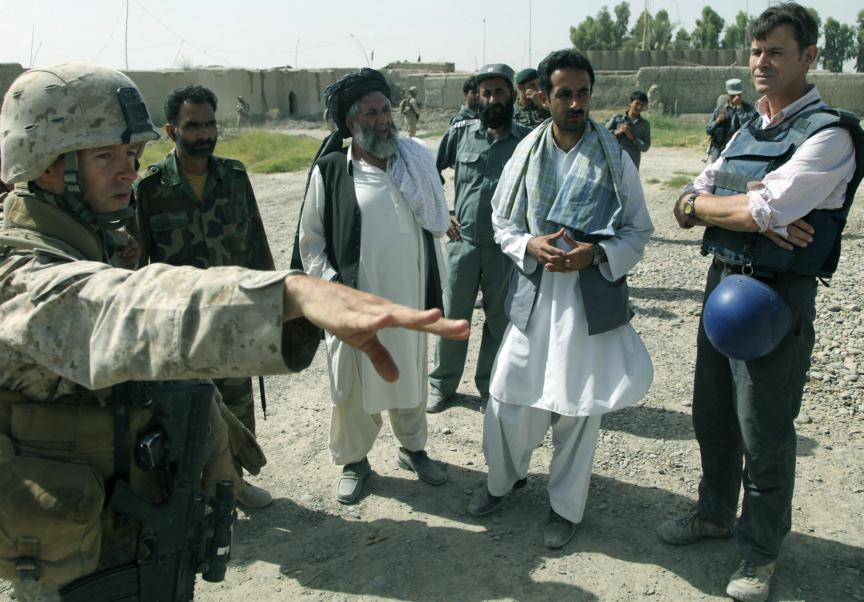
(From Left) LtCol William McCollough, Capt Saki Dad, Abdul Manaf, Haji Muhammed Nafex Kahn, Shamsi, and Ian Purves plan a community shura in the Nawa District Bazaar.

As of February 2010 the Nawa-i-Barakzayi district is governed by Abdul Manaf. He lives in a compound next to a Marine base. The District Administrator is Haji Mohammed Khan. The District Chief of Police is Haji Muhammed Nafex Kahn. The Afghan National Army in the area is led by Captain Saki Dad. The International Security Assistance Force main representative is Lieutenant Colonel Matt Baker of the 1st Battalion, 3rd Marines. Ian Purves is a British stabilization advisor from the Helmand Provincial Reconstruction Team. Scott Dempsey is the representative from USAID. Abdul Manaf was appointed District Governor in the summer of 2009.

== Infrastructure ==
A 2008 survey by the Afghan government recorded 49 villages, 18 Community Development Councils, 12 Primary Schools, 7 Secondary Schools, and 4 Health Centers, with 10 km of asphalted roads. As of February 2010 its bazaar had more than 100 shops, as opposed to 6 before Operation Strike of the Sword. After the Taliban fled in 2009 the district marketplace reopened, irrigation canal clearing projects started, and a local community council was established. By 2010 millions of dollars were being pumped into public works projects, including a town hall and police station. There were also numerous agricultural projects spearheaded by various NGOs, including USAID. In 2009 they delivered wheat grain seeds to 6,000 farmers. As of 2010 250 workers had been hired to construct plastic crop tunnels that function like a greenhouse and 4,000 farmers had signed up to receive the tunnels along with seed to plant alternative crops. The main problems were still a lack of Afghan security forces, teachers, agricultural advisers and doctors. The main road through the district is Route 605. There are currently plans to build a road linking Nawa and nearby Garmsir District with the provincial capital Lashkar Gah.

== Filmography ==
Nawa and the 1st Battalion, 5th Marines were featured in the independent documentary film Patrol Base Jaker (2011). The film features Abdul Manaf in his role as the Nawa District Governor and Haji Mohammed Khan as the Nawa District Administrator. Filmmaker David Scantling joined the Marines during their 2009 deployment in the Nawa District.
