= Forward Operating Base Delhi =

FOB Delhi
- Garmsir, Garmsir District, Helmand Province in Afghanistan
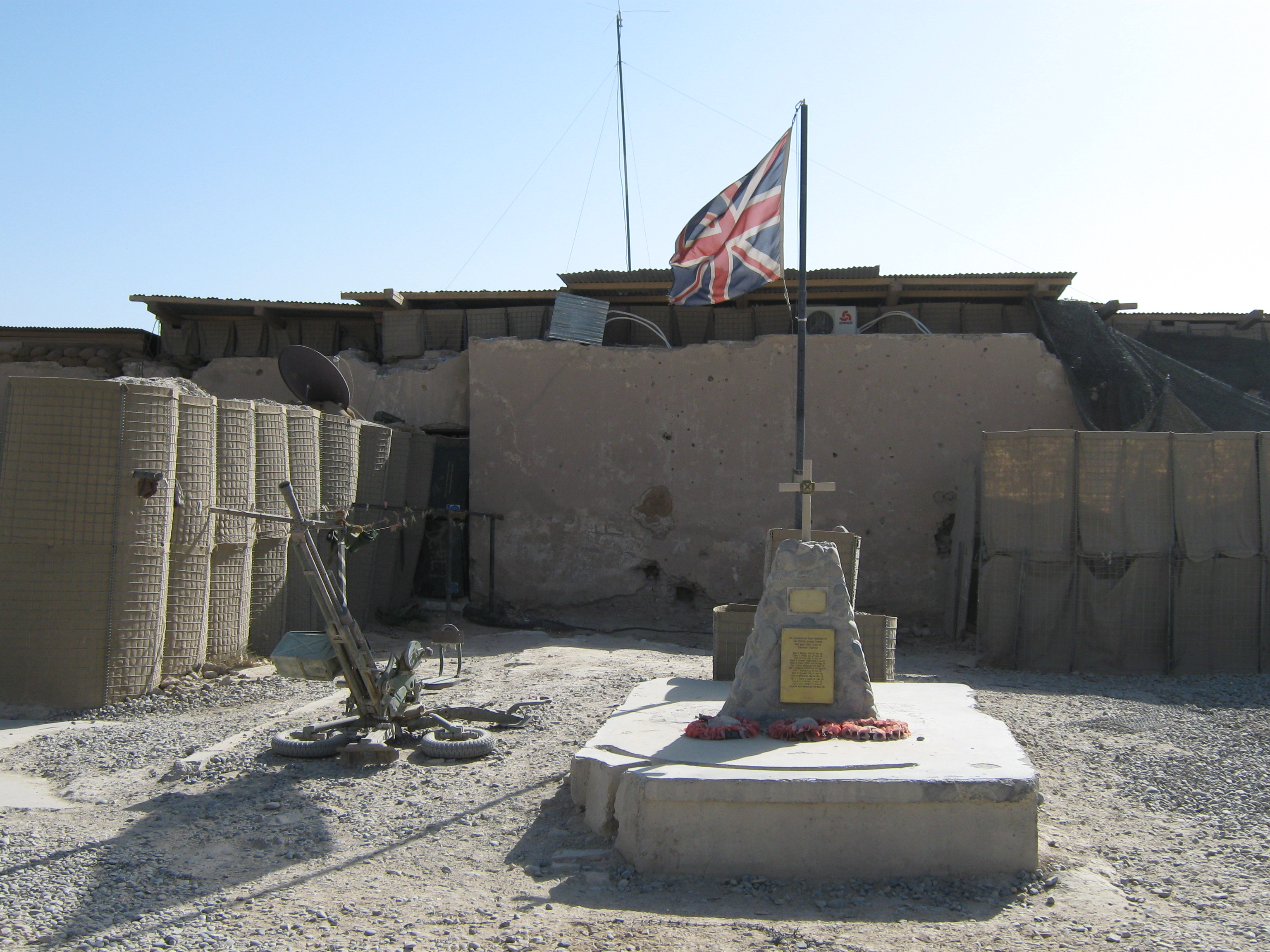
- Memorial at FOB Delhi, Afghanistan

Site information
- Owner: International Security Assistance Force (ISAF)
- Operator: United States Marine Corps; Afghan National Army (ANA)

Location
- Shown within Afghanistan
- Coordinates: 31°07′58″N 064°11′22″E

Site history
- Built: January 2006
- In use: 2006–2012

Airfield information
- Elevation: 869 metres (2,851 ft) AMSL
Helipads
Number	Length and surface
01	30 metres (98 ft) Concrete

Forward Operating Base Delhi in Afghanistan was a military expeditionary base occupied by the United States Marine Corps. It was along the Helmand River Valley in Garmsir at an abandoned Agricultural College building.

== History ==
The base was originally established by members of the Ministry of Defence and used by British units under Operation Herrick until 2008 when the base was taken over by the 24th Marine Expeditionary Unit and was transferred to the British Army regiment, The Light Dragoons of Task Force Helmand, on September 8, 2008.

In June 2009, it was transferred to the U.S. Marines of Task Force Leatherneck.

== Units ==
It has been used by:

- OP H IV – 16 Air Assault Brigade (May 2006 – November 2006):
  - 1st Battalion, Royal Irish Regiment
  - Multiple One (India Company), 3 Commando Brigade Royal Marines' Command Support Group.
- OP H V – 3 Commando Brigade (November 2006 – April 2007):
  - Information Exploitation Group
  - Unknown Company from 42 Commando.
- OP H VI – 12th Mechanized Brigade (April 2007 – October 2007):
  - 3 Company, Grenadier Guards
- OP H VII – 52nd Infantry Brigade (October 2007 – April 2008):
  - B Company, 1st Battalion, Royal Gurkha Rifles
- OP H VIII – 16 Air Assault Brigade (April 2008 – September 2008):
  - A Company, 5th Battalion, Royal Regiment of Scotland
  - 51 Parachute Squadron, Royal Engineers
  - 24th Marine Expeditionary Unit.
- OP H IX – 3 Commando Brigade (September 2008 – April 2009):
  - C Company, 1st Battalion, The Rifles
  - 1st The Queen's Dragoon Guards
  - B Company, 2nd Battalion, Princess of Wales's Royal Regiment
- OP H X – 19th Light Brigade (April 2009 – June 2009):
- OEF – (June 2009 – October 2009)
  - 2nd Battalion, 8th Marines
- OEF 11 – (October 2009 – February 2010)
  - 2nd Battalion, 2nd Marines
- OEF (February 2010 – October 2010)
  - 3rd Battalion, 1st Marines
- OEF (October 2010 – May 2011)
  - 2nd Battalion, 1st Marines
- OEF 11 – (April 2011– October 2011)
  - 1st Battalion, 3rd Marines
- OEF 11.1 – (October 2011 – May 2012)
  - Kilo Company, 3rd Battalion, 3rd Marines
- OEF – (May 2012 – December 2012)
  - 3rd Battalion, 8th Marines
- OEF – (December 2012 – May 2013)
  - Kilo Company, 3rd Battalion, 9th Marines

== Forward Operating Base Delhi Massacre ==
On August 10, 2012, an Afghan teenager entered an on-base gym and fired an AK-47 killing 3 US Marines and injuring another. The incident is being investigated by the Naval Criminal Investigative Service (NCIS) and the US Attorney's Office in New York.

== See also ==
- Operation Herrick order of battle
- History of the United States Marine Corps
- List of United States Marine Corps installations
- List of ISAF installations in Afghanistan
