= 3d Littoral Combat Team =

Third Littoral Combat Team
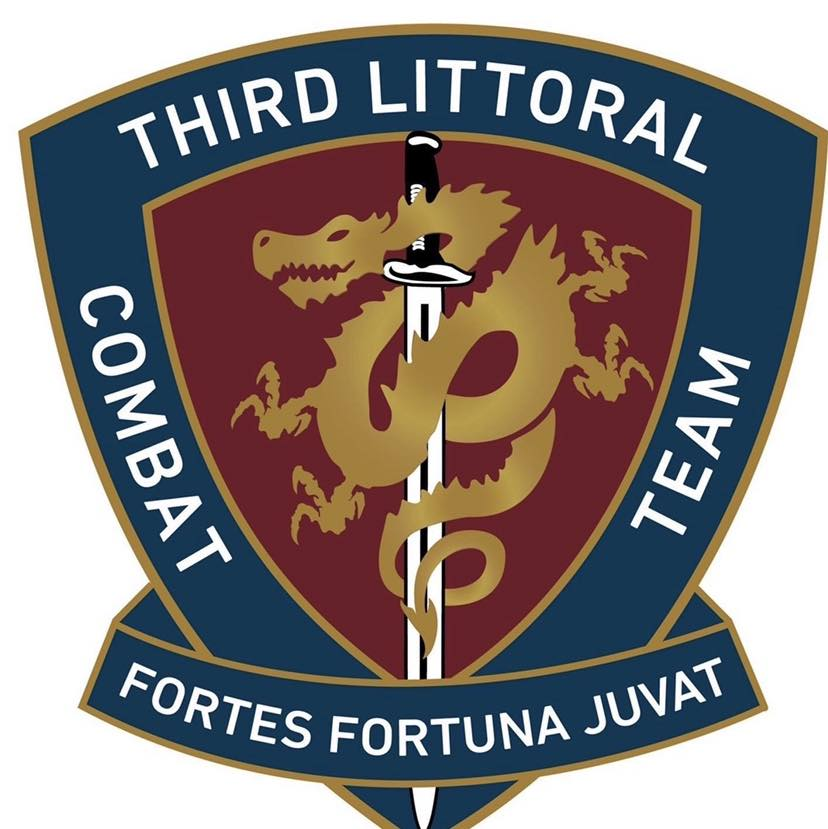
- 3d LCT insignia
- Founded: May 1, 1942; 84 years ago
- Country: United States of America
- Branch: United States Marine Corps
- Type: littoral combat
- Role: 3d Littoral Combat Team conducts reconnaissance and counter-reconnaissance, employs and enables multi-domain fires, and establishes expeditionary sites in order to support the maritime campaign across the competition continuum.
- Size: 800
- Part of: 3d Marine Littoral Regiment; 3d Marine Division
- Garrison/HQ: Marine Corps Base Hawaii
- Nicknames: "Lava Dogs & Chicha Jima Marines”
- Mottos: "Fortuna Fortes Juvat" "Fortune Favors the Brave"
- Engagements: World War II: Battle of Bougainville; Battle of Guam; Vietnam War; Operation Desert Storm; War on terror: Operation Enduring Freedom; Operation Iraqi Freedom
- Website: 3d Littoral Combat Team

Commanders
- Current commander: Lieutenant Colonel Timothy W. Love
- Notable commanders: George O. Van Orden; Ronald R. Van Stockum

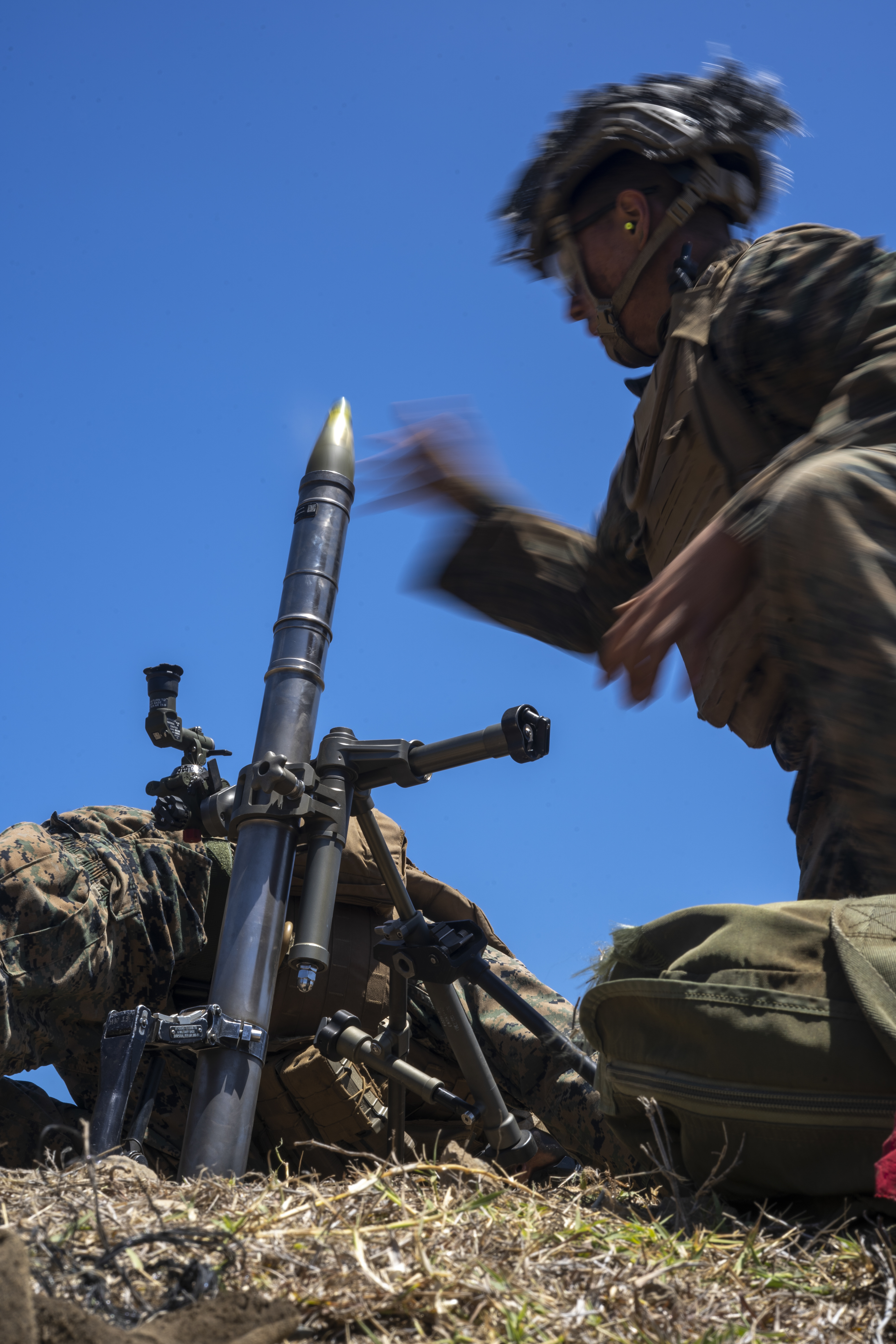
U.S. Marines with 1st Battalion, 3rd Marines fire a 60mm mortar system during platoon attacks as part of Large Scale Exercise 2021, Marine Corps Base Hawaii, Aug. 6, 2021. LSE21 is a live, virtual, and constructive exercise employing integrated command and control, intelligence, surveillance, reconnaissance, and sensors across the joint force to expand battlefield awareness, share targeting data, and conduct long-range precision strikes in support of naval operations in a contested and distributed maritime environment. (U.S. Marine Corps photo by Cpl. Juan Carpanzano)

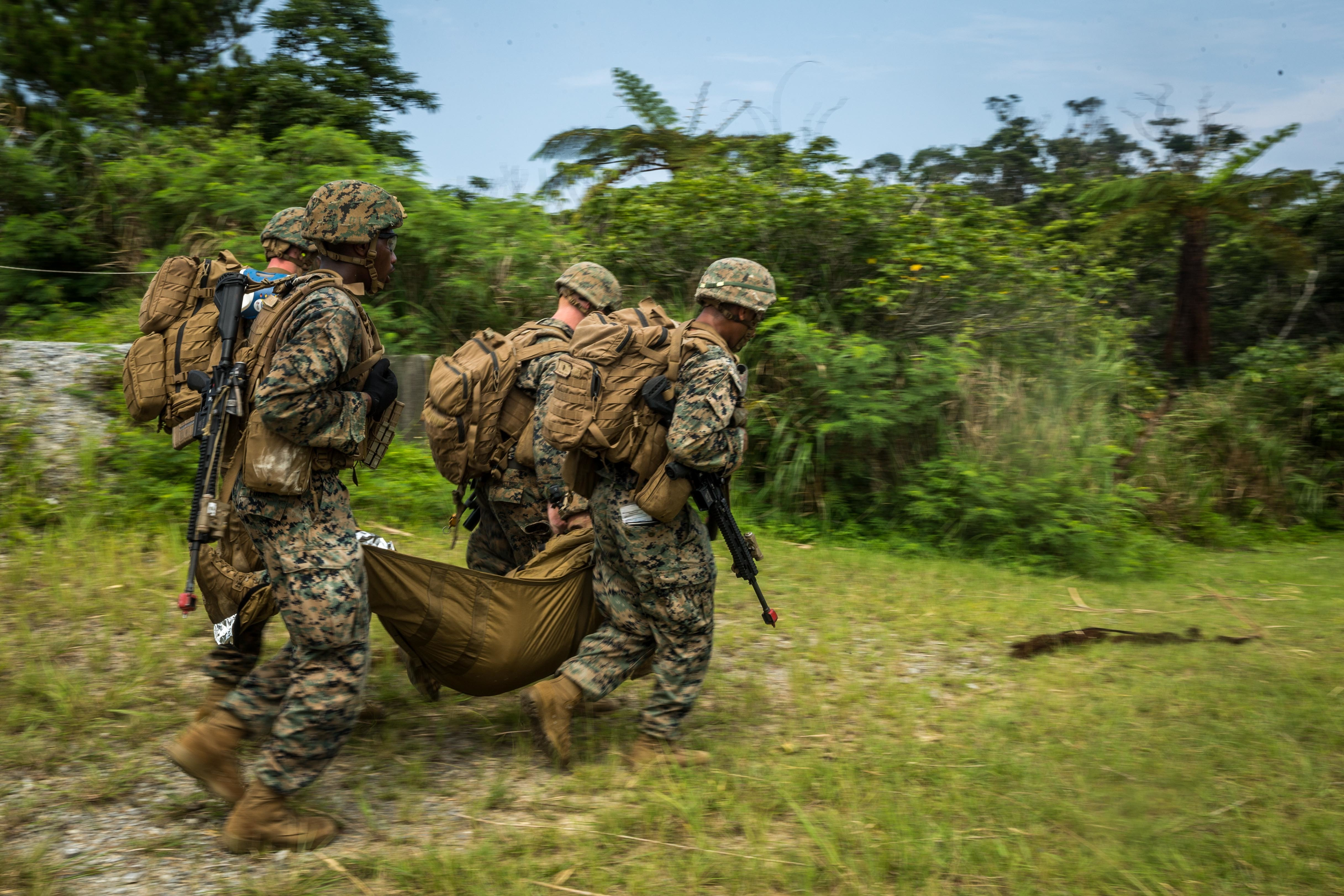
U.S. Marines with Company A, 1st Battalion, 3rd Marine Regiment, 3d Marine Division, carry a simulated casualty at the Jungle Warfare Training Center, Okinawa, Japan, August 6, 2020. The Marines were participating in an air assault to increase their proficiency at air insertions and maneuvering through simulated enemy terrain. (U.S. Marine Corps photo by Cpl. Savannah Mesimer)

The 3d Littoral Combat Team (formerly 1st Battalion, 3d Marines) is an infantry unit in the United States Marine Corps based out of Marine Corps Base Hawaii. Nicknamed the "Lava Dogs", the unit consists of approximately 800 Marines and sailors and falls under the command of the 3d Marine Littoral Regiment of the 3rd Marine Division.

== Subordinate units ==
- Headquarters and Service Company (Headhunter)
- Alpha Company (Ares)
- Bravo Company (Banjo)
- Charlie Company (Chaos)
- Medium Range Missile Battery (Mako)

== Mission ==
Conducts reconnaissance and counter-reconnaissance, employs and enables multi-domain fires, and establishes expeditionary sites in order to support the maritime campaign across the competition continuum.

== History ==
=== 1980s ===
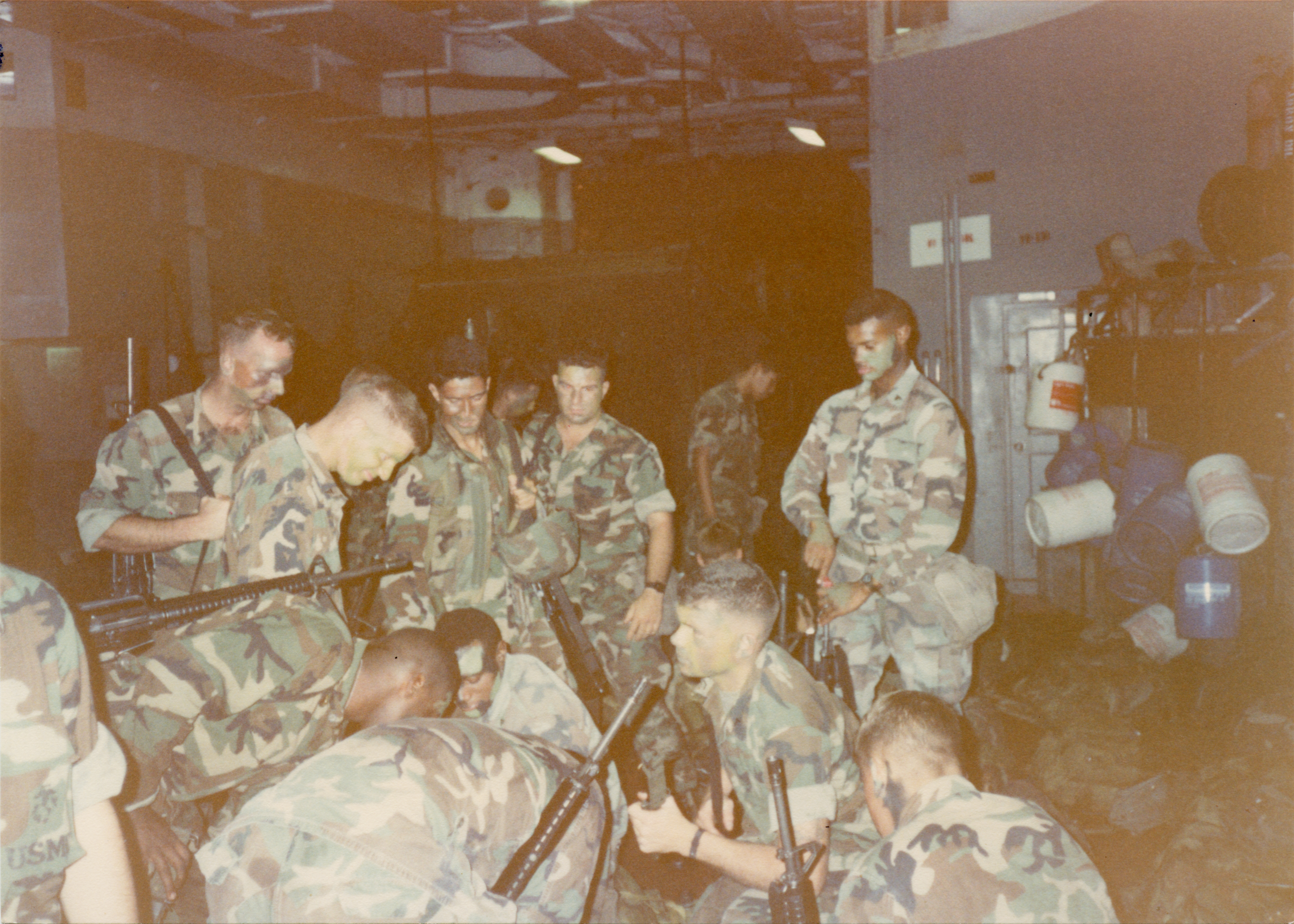
Alpha Company aboard USS Tuscaloosa in December 1989

Throughout the 1980s, 1/3 regularly deployed to Okinawa to serve as a forward staged unit in the Western Pacific area as part of the Marine Corps Unit Deployment Program. During the Unit Deployment Program, the battalion would regularly participate in exercises throughout the region, such as in Korea and Thailand. In December 1989, while at Okinawa, 1/3 responded to the 1989 Philippine coup attempt as part of an amphibious task force and sent Marines ashore to reinforce the American Embassy. The battalion formed the ground combat element of CTF-79 (Commander, Landing Force, Seventh Fleet).

=== The Gulf War and the 1990s ===
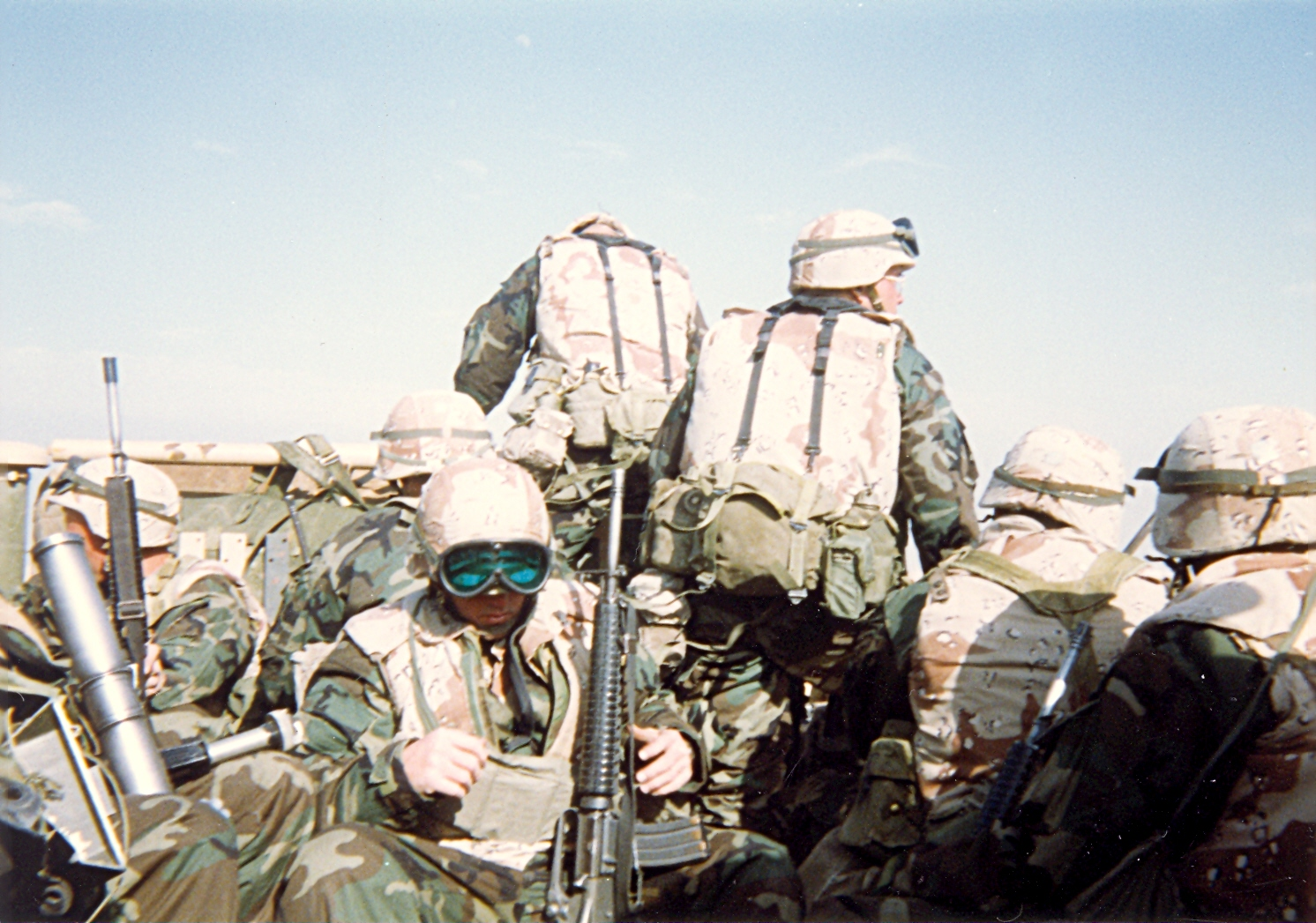
Weapons Platoon, Bravo Company in the Gulf War

In August 1990, 1st Battalion, 3d Marines deployed to Saudi Arabia for Operation Desert Shield and took up defensive positions along the coastal highway leading to Kuwait. In February 1991, 1/3 assaulted into Kuwait as part of the ground war of Operation Desert Storm to liberate the country from Iraqi occupation.

=== Global war on terrorism ===
1/3 was on the Unit Deployment Program (UDP) to Okinawa, Japan during the Al Qaeda terrorist attacks of September 11, 2001. Due to their proximity to Afghanistan, the battalion's Company A was one of the first infantry units to deploy to U.S. Central Command, of which Afghanistan is a part, after the September 11 attacks.

April 2003, 1/3 departed Kaneohe for another UDP in Okinawa, Japan. Alpha company, with Weapons company reinforcements left for the Philippines as the main support element under the guise of JTF-510. Alpha company carried out many joint missions with Navy SEAL/s, SWCC, and the CIA in terrorist surveillance activities, and security missions in Zamboanga Bay.

In June 2004, 1/3 (also known at the time as Battalion Landing Team 1/3, and including Battery C 1st Battalion 12th Marines - also from Marine Corps Base Hawaii) set off to tour what was known as a standard deployment around the South Pacific region with the 31st Marine Expeditionary Unit (MEU). In early September 2004, the unit arrived in Kuwait and soon after entered Iraq. The unit fought in the Second Battle of Fallujah as part of Regimental Combat Team 7 to clear the city of insurgents and reclaim the city. In one deployment, BLT 1/3 unfortunately lost more men compared to any Marine Corps Battalion during OIF/OEF. BLT 1/3 has produced one of very few nominations for the Medal of Honor thus far in the Global War on Terror, Sergeant Rafael Peralta.

On January 26, 2005, a CH-53E Super Stallion helicopter crashed in the Al-Anbar province taking with it the lives of 26 Kaneohe Bay Marines, along with one Navy Corpsman and four Marine aircrew from a mainland unit. The majority of the 27 Marines lost in the crash were from Charlie Company of Battalion Landing Team 1/3. Battalion Landing Team 1/3 lost a total of 45 Marines during the course of their first combat tour in Iraq.

In January 2006, the battalion deployed to eastern Afghanistan in support of Operation Enduring Freedom. During this five-month deployment they operated throughout the Korangal Valley and were known as "Task Force Lava." On June 1, 2006, 1/3 handed over their area of operations to the 1st Battalion, 32nd Infantry Regiment and shortly thereafter returned to Hawaii.

In March 2007, 1st Battalion 3d Marines deployed to Haditha, Iraq. 1/3 lost no Marines during this deployment, which was a first for the Marine Corps since the start of OIF.

The battalion deployed to Karma, Iraq from August 2008 - March 2009. One Marine was killed and five were injured on December 21, 2008.

The battalion again deployed to Afghanistan in November 2009 through June 2010, taking up positions in and around FOB Geronimo, within the district of Nawa-I-Barakzayi, Helmand Province. In February 2010, the battalion participated in Operation Moshtarak, the seizure of the Taliban stronghold of Marjah. The activities of Bravo and Charlie Companies were covered extensively in a series of articles by C. J. Chivers in The New York Times, and in the "At War Blog" posted on The New York Times website. A total of five Marines were KIA, along with one British reporter this deployment.

The battalion deployed once more to Afghanistan in April 2011, taking up positions south of FOB Delhi, in Garmsir District, Helmand Province.

=== Redesignation and littoral operations ===
1st Battalion, 3d Marines was redesignated as the 3d Littoral Combat Team on June 23, 2022, at a ceremony on Marine Corps Base Hawaii. This redesignation was driven by the Commandant of the Marine Corps' Force Design 2030 initiative to man, train, and equip forces in the Indo-Pacific capable of supporting sea control and sea denial operations in actively contested maritime spaces.

== Gallery ==
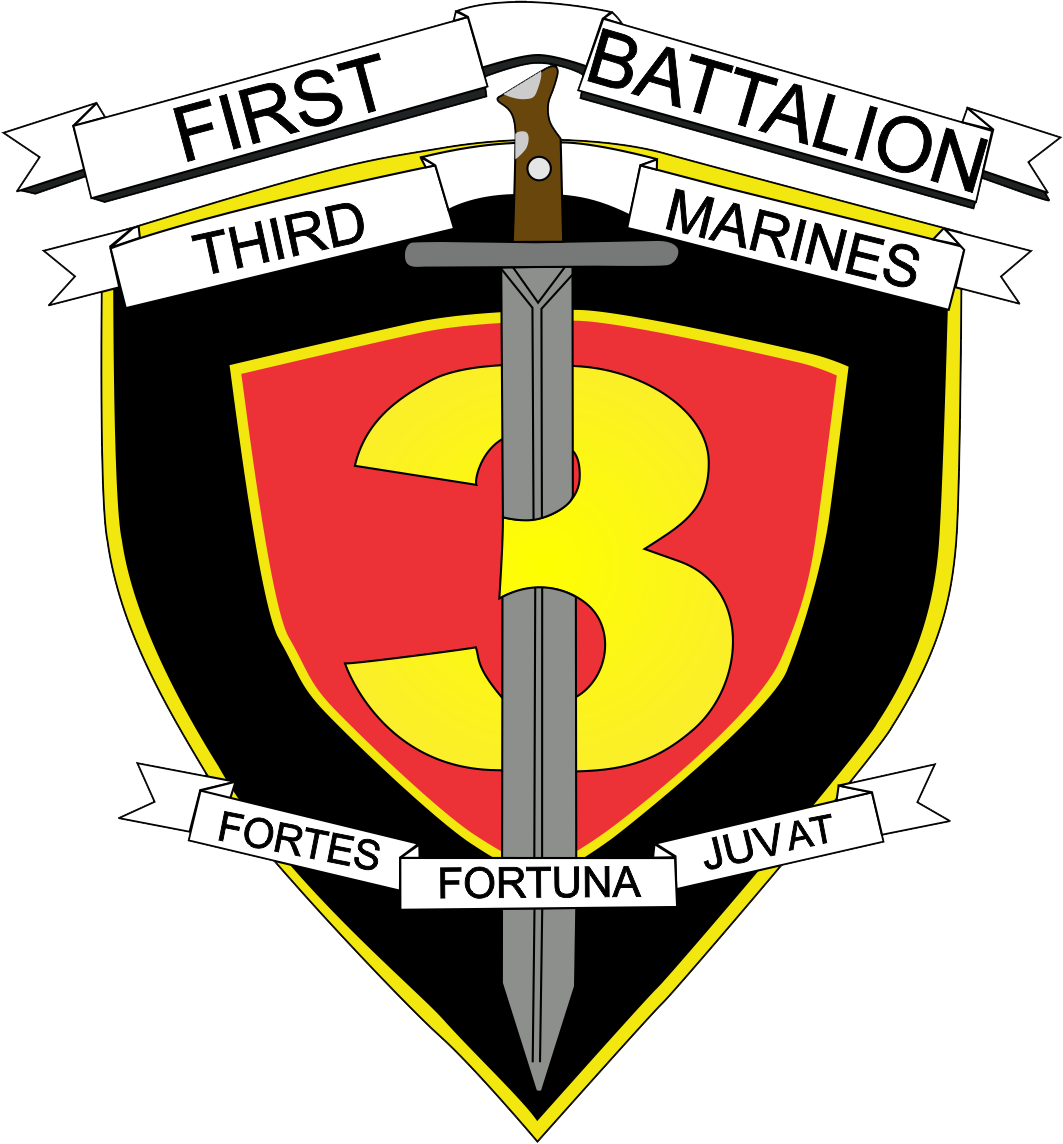
Old 1st Battalion, 3d Marine insignia

== Awards ==
- Presidential Unit Citation w/ 3 bronze stars
  - Guam - 1944
  - Vietnam - 1965 - 1967, 1967
  - Afghanistan - 2010
- Navy Unit Commendation w/ 1 bronze star & w/ 1 silver star
  - Bougainville - 1943
  - Vietnam - 1965, 1968–1969
  - Southwest Asia - 1990 - 1991
  - Southwest Asia / OEF I - 2001 - 2002
  - III MEF - 2003 - 2005
  - OEF Afghanistan - 2006
  - OIF Iraq I MEF - 2007-2008
  - OIF Iraq II MEF - 2008
- Meritorious Unit Commendation w/ 2 bronze stars
  - Vietnam - 1967 - 1968, 1968
  - Southwest Asia / OEF I - 2001-2002
  - III MEF- 2008-2010
- Asiatic-Pacific Campaign Medal w/ 4 bronze stars
- World War II Victory Medal
- Navy Occupation Service Medal
- National Defense Service Medal w/ 3 bronze stars
- Korean Service Medal
- Armed Forces Expeditionary Medal
- Vietnam Service Medal w/ 2 silver stars
- Southwest Asia Service Medal w/ 2 bronze stars
- Vietnam Cross of Gallantry w/ palm streamer
- Iraq Campaign Medal w/3 bronze stars
- Afghanistan Campaign Medal w/5 bronze stars
- Global War on Terrorism Service Medal
- Global War on Terrorism Expeditionary Medal

== See also ==
- 12th Littoral Combat Team
- List of United States Marine Corps battalions
- Organization of the United States Marine Corps

== Notable members ==
- William R. Higgins, platoon commander in C Company during the Vietnam War
- Jan C. Huly
- Rafael Peralta, Iraqi Freedom
- Wayne Rollings, platoon commander
- Oliver North
