= Route 605 (Afghanistan) =

Road in Afghanistan

Route 608

Location
- Country: Afghanistan

Highway system
- Transport in Afghanistan

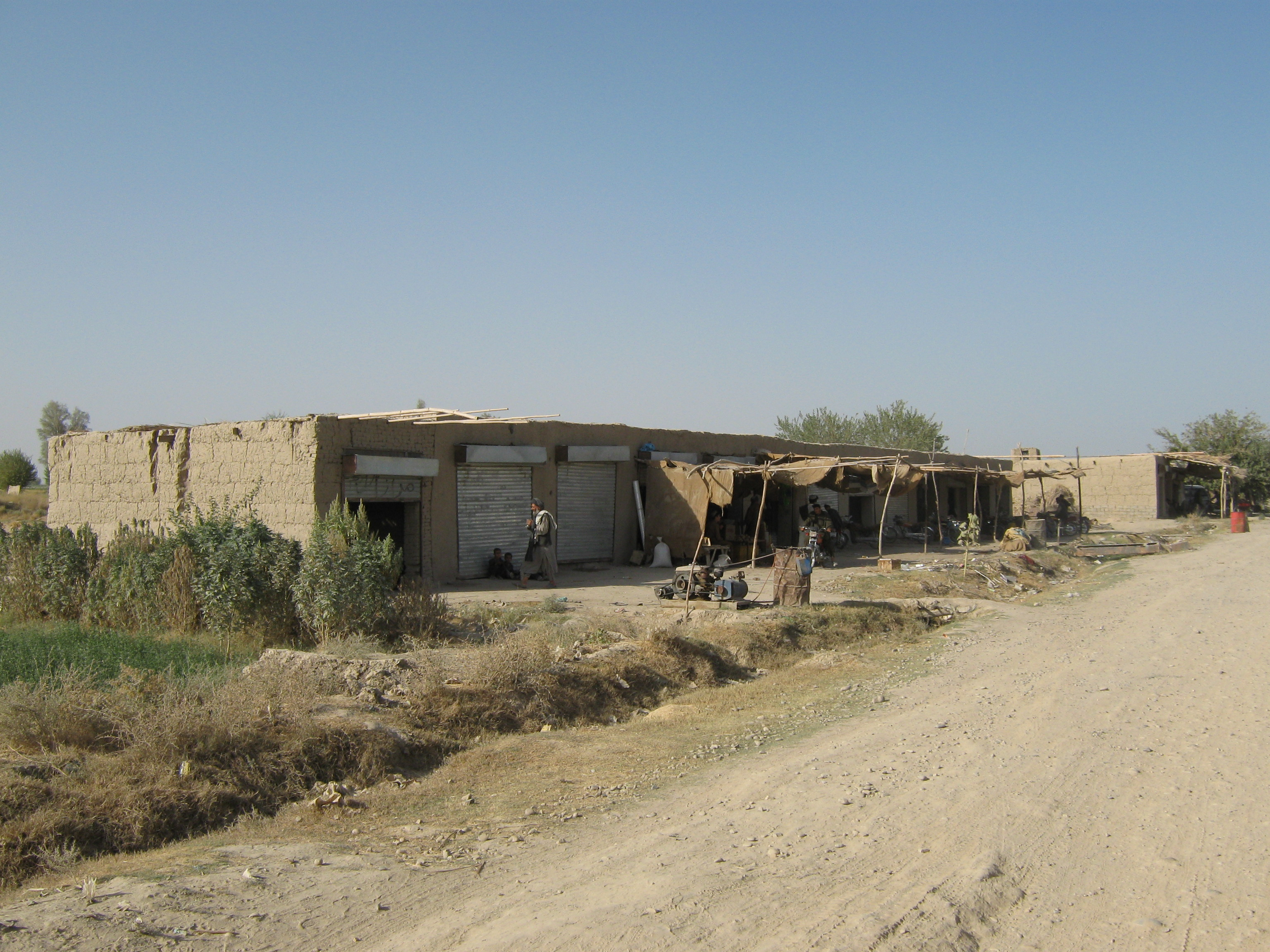
Kochnay Prong Bazaar, Nawa District on Route 605

Route 608 is the main road between Garmsir District and Lashkar Gah, the Capital of Helmand Province, Afghanistan. This 71 kilometer road goes through Nawa-I-Barakzayi District Center and Marjah (as Route 605).
