= Camp Dwyer =

US military installation in Afghanistan

Camp Dwyer Tactical Base Dwyer
- Garmsir District, Helmand Province in Afghanistan
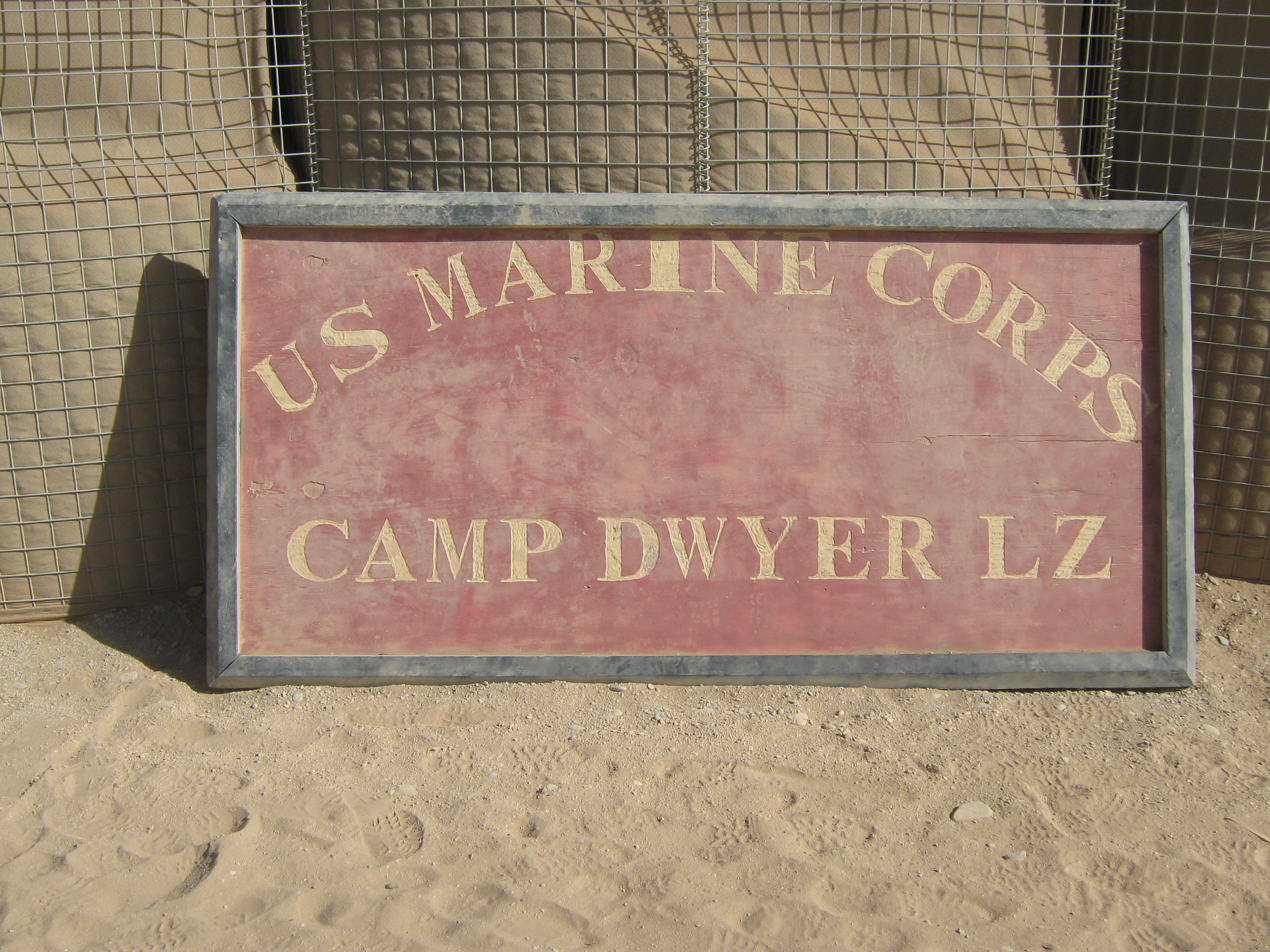
- Helicopter Landing Zone sign

Site information
- Owner: Resolute Support Mission
- Operator: United States Marine Corps (USMC)

Location
- Shown within Afghanistan
- Coordinates: 31°06′04″N 64°04′02″E
- Area: 1,400 acres

Site history
- Built: 2007 & expanded in 2009
- In use: 2007-2021

Airfield information
- Elevation: 735 metres (2,411 ft) AMSL
Runways
Direction	Length and surface
05L/23R	2,400 metres (7,874 ft) Asphalt

Camp Dwyer was a military camp of the United States Marine Corps located within the Helmand River Valley southwest of Garmsir in Garmsir District, Helmand Province, Afghanistan.

== History ==
The base was originally a forward operating base however in May 2009 it was expanded into a Camp by Naval Mobile Construction Battalion 5 (NMCB 5), it was further expanded by NMCB 3 in November 2011.

The base was named after South African Lance Bombardier James Dwyer (1984–2006), of 29th Commando Regiment Royal Artillery, who was killed on Wednesday 27 December 2006, aged 22, when the vehicle he was driving struck an anti-tank mine while on a patrol in southern Helmand Province.

The base was a major USMC installation and one of the largest camps the Marines used in Southern Helmand. Immediately adjacent to, and connected to the Marine base was an installation known as Camp Gamsir which was the headquarters of the 1st Brigade 215th Corps. Some Marines lived on this smaller Afghan base as part of a training detail.

The base was significantly reduced in physical size and number of personal assigned. As of January 2014 about 700 military and civilian personnel were at the base, and the base size was reduced to about 1,400 acres.

== Units ==
Afghan units • Afghan National Army (ANA)

Jordanian Unit • 2012

British units

- Operation Herrick 5 -
  - Elements of 4 Logistic Support Regiment, 60 Close Support Sqn, Royal Logistic Corps
  - One troop of light guns from 29th Commando Regiment Royal Artillery
- Operation Herrick 7 - Household Cavalry Regiment Battlegroup HQ
  - 4th Regiment Royal Artillery, Lawson Troop.258 signal sqn (52 inf bde)

American units 1st Battalion 41st Infantry Regiment, 4th Infantry Division March 2018- November 2018

- 2nd Brigade, 87th Infantry Regiment, 10th Mountain Division October 2018-July 2019
- 5th Squadron, 73rd Cavalry Regiment, 82d Airborne Division July 2019-December 2019
- Georgia Army National Guard Police Mentor Team "Falcon", January 2008-May 2008
- 809th Expeditionary RED HORSE Squadron
- Operation Asada Wosa. Battalion Landing Team 1st Battalion, 6th Marines, Reinforced March - October 2008.
- Operation Eastern Storm. 1st Battalion, 6th Marines between July 2011 and January 2012
- Detachment of Naval Mobile Construction Battalion Seven during December 2008.
- 2nd Battalion 8th Marines during July 2009.
- Regimental Combat Team 3 between June 2009 - October 2009 commanded by Col. Duffy White.
- Regimental Combat Team 7 (RCT 7) between September 2009 and September 2010.
- Company B, Det-B of 2nd Assault Amphibian Battalion during December 2009.
- Naval Mobile Construction Battalion Five between December 2008 - September 2009 led by Officer in Charge LT Gregory Woods
- Naval Mobile Construction Battalion Three between November 2010 - January 2011.
- RCT 1 between September 2010 and July 2011
- RCT 5 between August 2011 and July 2012 commanded by Col. Roger Turner
- 2nd Battalion, 10th Marines between May 2012 and September 2012
- RCT 7 between September 2012 and July 2013 commanded by Col. Austin Renforth.
- 3rd Battalion, 9th Marines between October 2012 and May 2013
- Elements of 2nd Battalion 8th Marines between July 2013 and October 2013.
- Combat Logistics Battalion 8 between May 2009 and October 2009
- Combat Logistics Battalion 1 between Oct 2009 and May 2010
- Combat Logistics Battalion 5 between April 2010 and October 2010
- Combat Logistics Battalion 3 between Aug 2010 and May 2011
- Combat Logistics Battalion 7 between April 2011 and October 2011
- Combat Logistics Battalion 1 between Oct 2011 and May 2012
- 31st Combat Support Hospital March 2010 and January 2011
- 115th Combat Support Hospital January 2011 and December 2011
- Elements of Retrograde Redeployment Reset and Reconstitution Operations Group (R4OG-12.1 (First successful operation)) From May 2012 through Dec 2012.
- Combat Logistics Battalion 5 providing logistical support for R4OG from April 2012 and August 2012.
- Elements of Retrograde Redeployment Reset and Reconstitution Operations Group (R4OG) From 13 Jun 2014 through 28 Oct 2012.
- Elements of 82nd Division (United States) 1st Brigade, 2/504 PIR From July 2017 through March 2018.
- 1st Battalion, 178th Infantry Regiment (Illinois Army National Guard) consisting of Headquarters and Headquarters Co, A Co, B Co, C Co and D Co from 16 Dec 2019 through March 31, 2020.
- C Co 1-211th Attack Battalion (Utah Army National Guard) consisting of 8 AH-64D Apache Helicopters from June 2020 - May 2021
- 921st Contingency Response Squadron April 2021 through Unknown 2021.
  - Permanently closed down Dwyer.

Danish units

- One troop of ARTHUR (Artillery hunting radar) Danish Artillery Regiment Early March 2007

Aviation assets

- Unknown Company, HMLA-169 during September 2009 (UH-1N).
- Unknown Company, HMLA-367 between January and February 2010 (AH-1W).
- Unknown Company, HMLA-169 during December 2010 (AH-1W).
- Unknown Company, HMLA-269 during June 2011 (AH-1W).
- Unknown Company, HMLA-469 between October and November 2012 (AH-1W & UH-1Y).
- VMU-3 between March 2011 and November 2011 (RQ-7B).
- Elements of 82nd Combat Aviation Brigade between 2009 and 2010.
- Company B, 5th Battalion, 101st Aviation Regiment, 101st Combat Aviation Brigade "Lancers" from March 2010 - February 2011.
- Company C, 1st Battalion, 214th Aviation Regiment, "Weizen Dust-Off" from August 2010 to August 2011 (UH-60A).
- Elements of 159th Combat Aviation Brigade between 2011 and 2012.
- Elements of 25th Combat Aviation Brigade between 2012 and 2013.
- Company F, 1st Battalion (General Support), 169th Aviation Regiment DUSTOFF from 2012 to 2013
- Elements of VMU-2 between June 2009 - November 2009 (RQ-7B Shadow) & October 2013 - May 2014 (Scan Eagle)

== See also ==
- History of the United States Marine Corps
- List of United States Marine Corps installations
- List of ISAF installations in Afghanistan
