= Jan C. Huly =

United States Marine Corps general

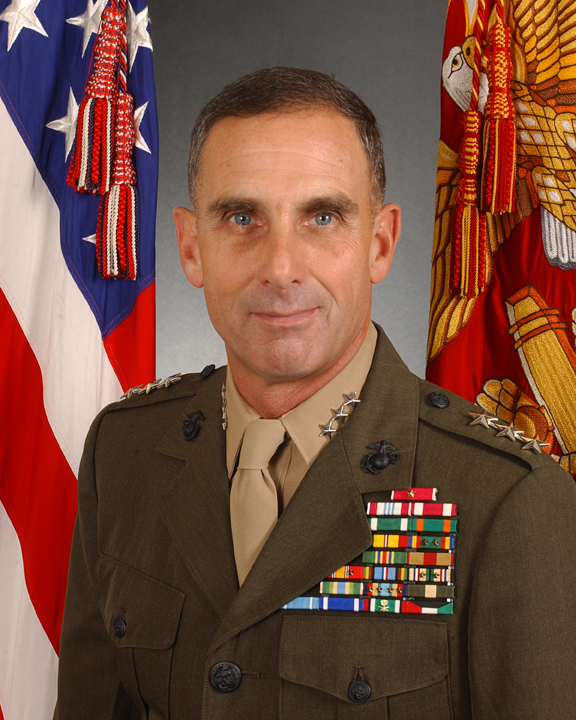
- LtGen. Jan C. Huly
- Military career
- Allegiance: United States of America
- Branch: United States Marine Corps
- Service years: 1969–2006
- Rank: Lieutenant general
- Commands: 22nd Marine Expeditionary Unit; MCRD San Diego; Deputy Commandant of the Marine Corps
- Conflicts: Operations Desert Shield and Desert Storm
- Awards: Navy Distinguished Service Medal; Legion of Merit (2); Defense Meritorious Service Medal

Jan C. Huly is a former United States Marine Corps officer who retired on 7 November 2006 after almost 37 years of service. His last role was as Deputy Commandant for Plans, Policies and Operations. Huly currently serves as the President and chief executive officer of the Marines' Memorial Association located in San Francisco, CA.

== Military career ==
Huly is a graduate of the University of California, Berkeley with a Bachelor of Science degree in Business Administration and was commissioned in December 1969. Upon completion of The Basic School, he was assigned to 1st Battalion, 3rd Marines, 1st Marine Expeditionary Brigade, Hawaii; and subsequently to 3rd Marine Division, where he served in various infantry command and staff assignments.

Transferred to Marine Corps Recruit Depot San Diego in 1972, he served as a series and recruit company commander, battalion staff officer and Director of the Recruit Administration Center. After completing Amphibious Warfare School in 1976, Captain Huly was assigned to 1st Marine Division at Camp Pendleton, California, where he served as a battalion staff officer, rifle company commander, and assistant operations officer for the 5th Marine Regiment.

From 1979 to 1980, he commanded the Marine Detachment, USS Ranger. Transferred to Washington, D.C. in 1980, Major Huly served with the Joint Chiefs of Staff. While there, he earned a Master of Arts degree in Personnel Management from Central Michigan University. Assigned to Headquarters Marine Corps in 1982, Major Huly served in various billets in the Personnel Management Division until 1984.

After graduating from the Marine Corps Command and Staff College in 1985, Major Huly reported to 2nd Marine Division at Camp Lejeune, North Carolina, where he made deployments overseas as an executive officer for battalion and regimental landing teams; and subsequently as Commanding Officer for Battalion Landing Team 1/8. He also served as Executive Officer, 2nd Surveillance, Reconnaissance and Intelligence Group. Completing the U.S. Army War College in 1990, Lieutenant Colonel Huly was assigned to Headquarters Marine Corps where he served as both the Assistant and Head of the Enlisted Assignment Branch. During Operations Desert Shield and Desert Storm, Lieutenant Colonel Huly was assigned to 2nd Marine Division in Saudi Arabia and Kuwait as the Deputy Assistant Chief of Staff for Operations.

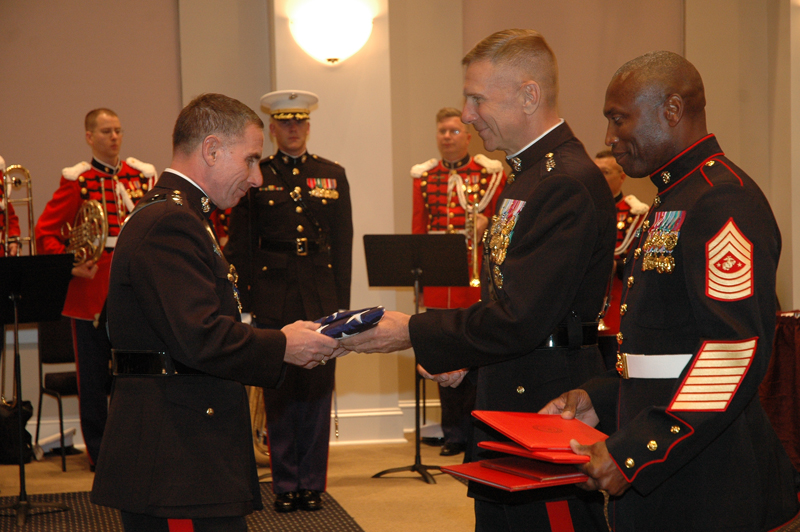
LtGen Huly receives an American flag from CMC General Hagee while the Sergeant Major of the Marine Corps John L. Estrada looks on.

From 1992 until 1994, Colonel Huly deployed as the Commanding Officer, 22nd Marine Expeditionary Unit and participated in Operations Provide Promise and Deny Flight in Bosnia-Herzegovina and Continue Hope/UNOSOM II in Somalia. He assumed duties as Chief of Staff, II Marine Expeditionary Force on June 1, 1994. He was assigned as the Assistant Division Commander, 1st Marine Division, Camp Pendleton, California, in 1995. Brigadier General Huly then served as the Deputy Commander, Marine Forces Reserve, New Orleans, Louisiana. From 1998 to 2000, MajGen Huly served as the Director, Operations Division, Plans Policies and Operations, Headquarters, U.S. Marine Corps. He was the Commanding General, Marine Corps Recruit Depot, San Diego and Western Recruiting Region/Deputy Commanding General, Marine Corps Recruiting Command from 2000 to 2003. Huly was advanced to the rank Lieutenant General on 2 October 2003. His last role was as the United States Marine Corps Deputy Commandant for Plans, Policies and Operations.

LtGen Huly retired from the Marine Corps on November 7, 2006, after over 36 years of service.

== Civilian career ==
Since leaving the Marine Corps, Jan has built upon his experiences in working at the national and international level with the United States and foreign governments, their agencies and the business community. He has consulted with numerous firms throughout the United States on defense, security, international relations and business opportunities and leadership related issues. He was also a member of the Defense Science Board for the Department of Defense, and continuous to serve on numerous boards of advisors and directors, and the Board of Directors of the Marine Corps Scholarship Foundation.

In July 2016, General Huly led an investigative panel that identified and credited a half dozen Marines for their participation in the flag-raising over Iwo Jima.

In October 2017, General Huly was selected to be president and CEO of the Marines' Memorial Association & Foundation. He assumed that post on 1 November 2017.

=== Awards ===
His decorations include:

| 1st Row | Navy Distinguished Service Medal | Legion of Merit w/ 1 gold award star | Defense Meritorious Service Medal | Meritorious Service Medal |
| 2nd Row | Navy and Marine Corps Commendation Medal | Navy and Marine Corps Achievement Medal | Combat Action Ribbon | Navy Unit Commendation w/ 2 service stars |
| 3rd Row | Navy Meritorious Unit Commendation | Marine Corps Expeditionary Medal | National Defense Service Medal w/ 2 service stars | Armed Forces Expeditionary Medal |
| 4th Row | Southwest Asia Service Medal w/ 2 service stars | Armed Forces Service Medal | Navy Sea Service Deployment Ribbon w/ 4 service stars | Marine Corps Drill Instructor Ribbon |
| 5th Row | United Nations Medal | NATO Medal for Yugoslavia | Kuwait Liberation Medal (Saudi Arabia) | Kuwait Liberation Medal (Kuwait) |
