= Marine Corps Detachment, Fort Leonard Wood =

Coordinates: 37°44′24.36″N 92°07′34.59″W

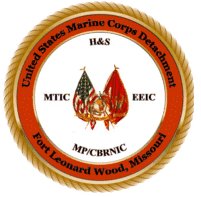
MCD logo

The Marine Corps Detachment at Fort Leonard Wood, Missouri hosts the largest United States Marine Corps detachment outside a Marine Corps base. With over 1200 students and support personnel, Ft Leonard Wood hosts Marines training at the Motor Transport Instruction School, Military Police Instruction School, Chemical Biological Radiological and Nuclear Defense School and the Engineer Equipment Instruction School.

== See also ==
- List of United States Marine Corps installations
