= Garmsir District =

Garmsir گرم سیر
- District
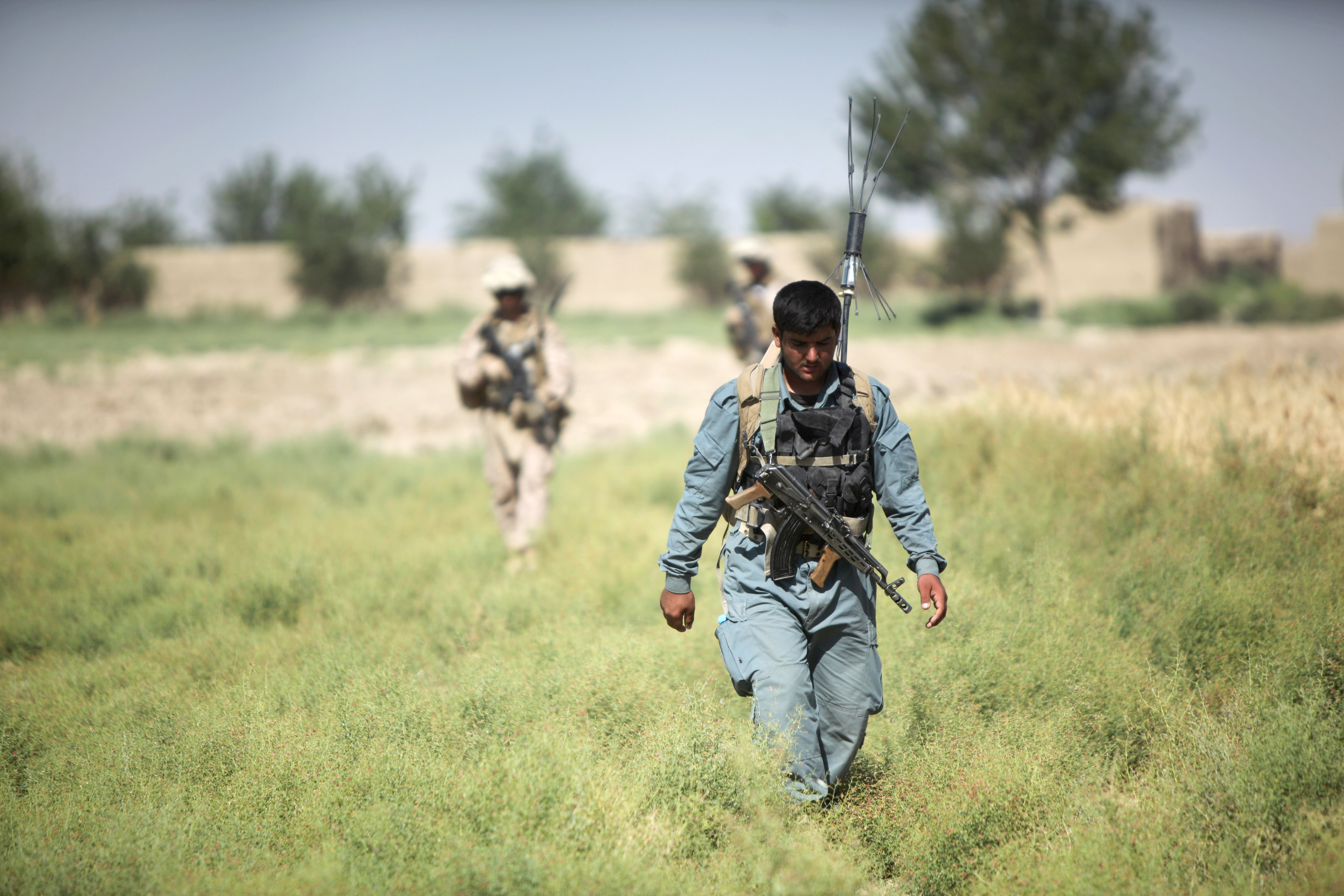
- Kilo Company, 3rd Battalion, 8th Marine Regiment, partnered with Afghan National Police, patrol through Garmsir District, June 1, 2012

- Location within Afghanistan
- Coordinates: 31°07′32″N 64°12′40″E
- Country: Afghanistan
- Province: Helmand Province

Population (2012)
  - Total: 85,500

Garmsir District (or Garmser; Pashto: ګرمسير) is located in the southern part of Helmand Province, Afghanistan. The district is large, but all the villages are along the Helmand River. The rest is a desert. The district capital, Garmsir, is located in the northwestern part of the district on the east bank of Helmand River.

== History ==
Garsmir was controlled by the Safavid dynasty of Iran in the 17th century, under the name Tor Agha. In 1747, Ahmad Shah Durrani conquered it and changed the name to Garmsir, which means "hot place" in Persian. Ahmad Shah sent Pashtun settlers from the Alizai and Nurzai tribes to occupy and farm the land.

Between the 1950s and 1970s, Garmsir was transformed by the work of the Helmand and Arghandab Valley Authority, which built a canal system throughout Helmand and vastly increased the amount of arable land in Garsmir. In the early 1970s, King Zahir Shah and his successor Mohammed Daoud sent 25,000 immigrants to Garmsir to occupy the newly irrigated land.

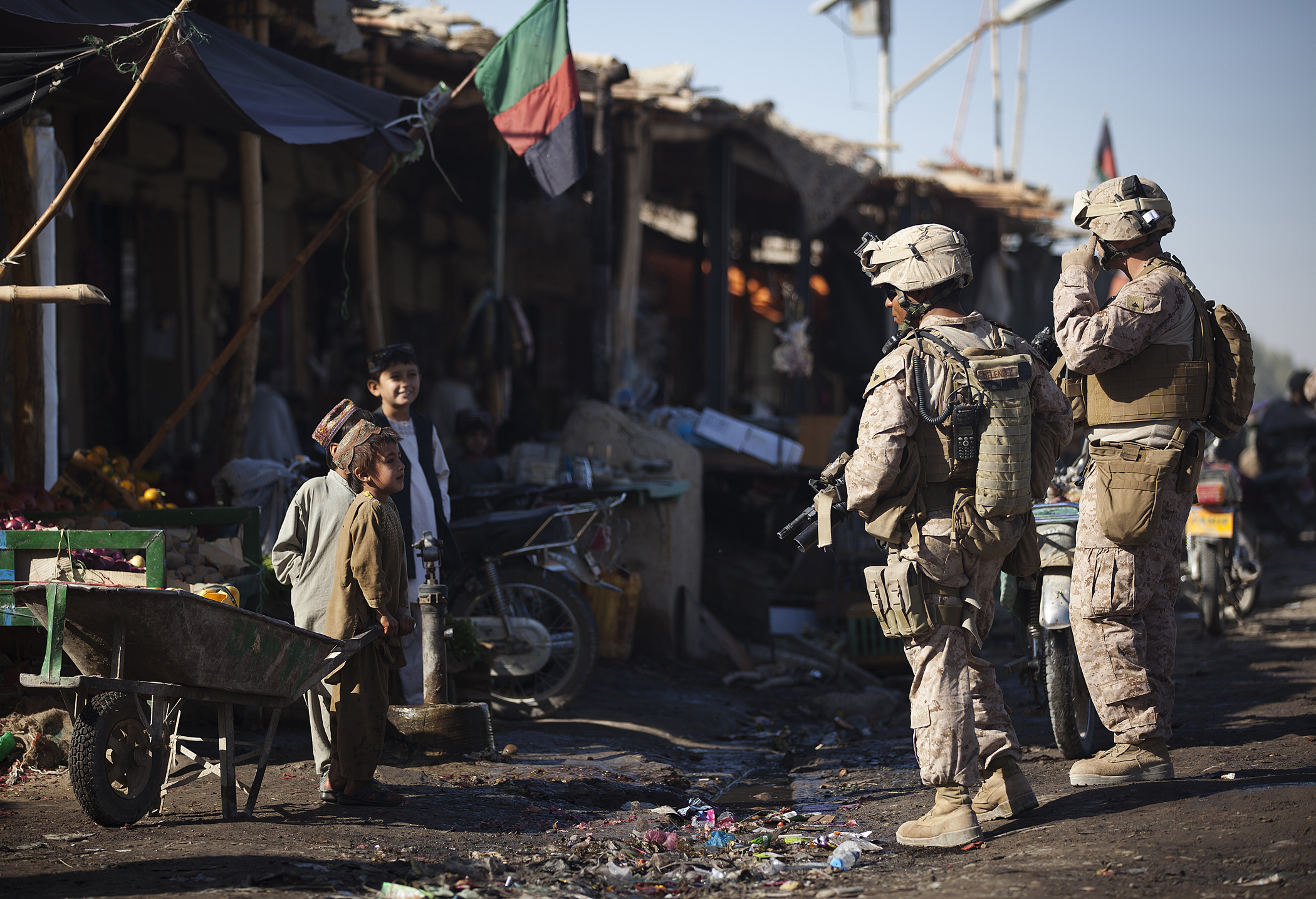
US Marines operating in Garmsir in 2011

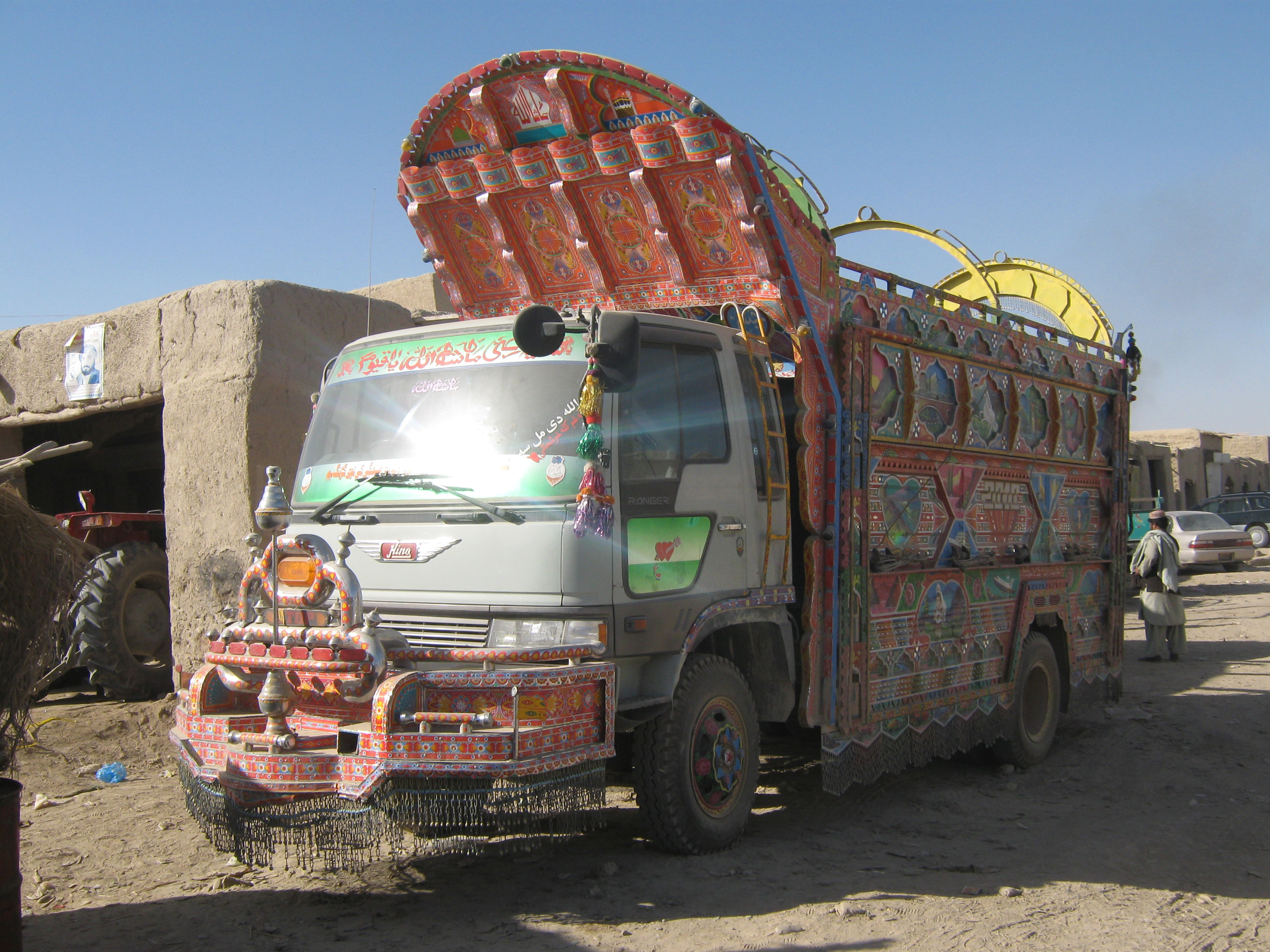
Jingle truck at the bazaar in Garmsir

Garmsir was contested throughout the Soviet–Afghan War, with mujahideen controlling the majority of the district and communist forces holding the district center. The mujahideen captured the district center in August 1988 and expelled the communists. Following the mujahideen victory, violence broke out between Alizai and Noorzai tribal leaders over who would rule the district. The fighting ended with an Alizai victory in September 1989, when Nasim Akhundzada brought 600 fighters from Musa Qala to reinforce the Alizai. Approximately 300 people were killed during the year-long conflict. The Alizai chose a Barakzai man named Abdullah Jan to serve as district governor.

In early 1995, the Taliban conquered Garmsir, along with the rest of Helmand. They ruled until the United States invasion of Afghanistan in 2001.

During the War in Afghanistan (2001–present), the Battle of Garmsir took place in the district from 2007 to 2011. The district contained ISAF installations including Forward Operating Base Delhi and Camp Dwyer.

== Geography ==
The district consists largely of desert terrain, except for a narrow irrigated strip 10 kilometers wide and 70 kilometers long in the valley of the Helmand River. Almost all of the population lives in the irrigated area. The four main communities are Hazar Joft, Darveshan, Laki, and Safar.

== Demographics ==
The population is 85,500 - 99% of them Pashtun and 1% Balouch.

== Economy ==
The district is poor. Main sources of income include daily wages (labors, working in fruit markets, and selling home products, driving, shop keeping etc.) and agriculture. Agriculture is the main source of income and most of the arable land is irrigated.
