= Mohammad Nasim Akhundzada =

Mohammad Nasim Akhundzada محمد نسیم آخوندزاده
- Born: Helmand province, Afghanistan
- Died: 25 March 1990; Close to Peshawar, Khyber Pakhtunkhwa, Pakistan
- Military career
- Allegiance: Mujahideen
- Conflicts: Soviet–Afghan War

Mullah Mohammad Nasim Akhundzada (died 1990) was a mujahideen commander and Pashtun warlord who operated in Helmand Province, Afghanistan during the 1980s. Based out of Musa Qala in northern Helmand, Nasim was from the Alizai tribe. He issued a fatwa legalizing poppy cultivation in 1981. During the 1980s he gradually consolidated power over most of Helmand, eliminating other mujahideen factions. He was assassinated near Peshawar on 25 March 1990 on the orders of Gulbuddin Hekmatyar. His nephew Sher Mohammad Akhundzada was the governor of Helmand until 2005 and is an important Afghan politician.
