= Forward Operating Base Geronimo =

FOB Geronimo
- Nawa-I-Barakzayi District, Helmand Province in Afghanistan
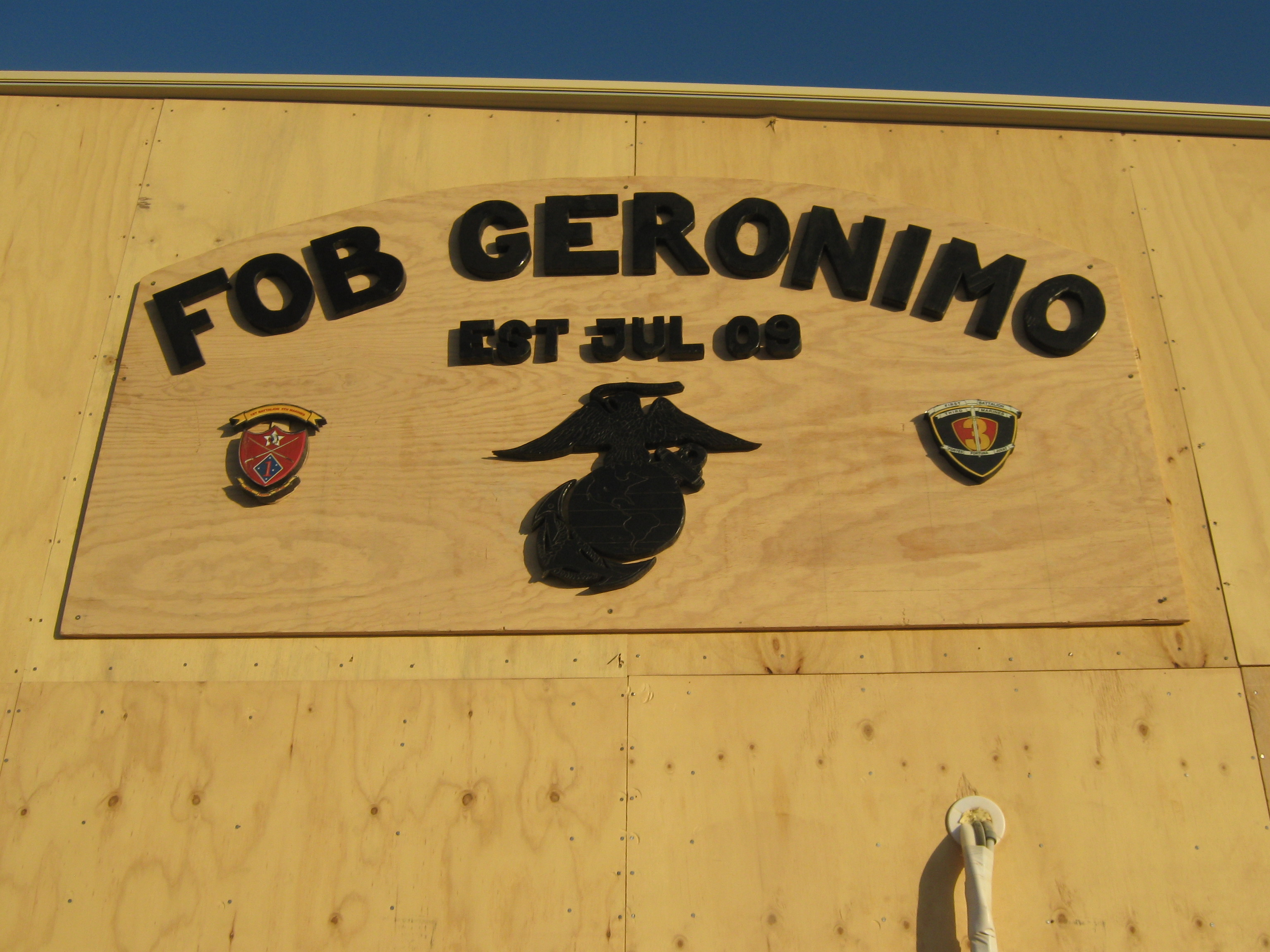

Site information
- Type: Forward operating base
- Owner: International Security Assistance Force (ISAF)
- Operator: United States Marine Corps; Afghan National Army (ANA)

Location
- Shown within Afghanistan

Site history
- Built: July 2009
- In use: 2009-2014

Airfield information
- Elevation: 869 metres (2,851 ft) AMSL
Helipads
Number	Length and surface
01	30 metres (98 ft) Concrete

FOB Geronimo is a former Forward operating base located along the Helmand River Valley in Nawa-I-Barakzayi District, Helmand Province, Afghanistan. It was originally built for 1st Battalion, 5th Marines (1/5) by Combat Logistics Battalion 8 (CLB8), of the United States Marine Corps in summer of 2009. 1st Battalion, 3rd Marines conducted a relief-in-place with 1/5 in December 2009.

== See also ==
- History of the United States Marine Corps
- List of United States Marine Corps installations
- List of NATO installations in Afghanistan
