= Nawa-I-Barakzayi =

Village in Nangarhar Province, Afghanistan

- Village
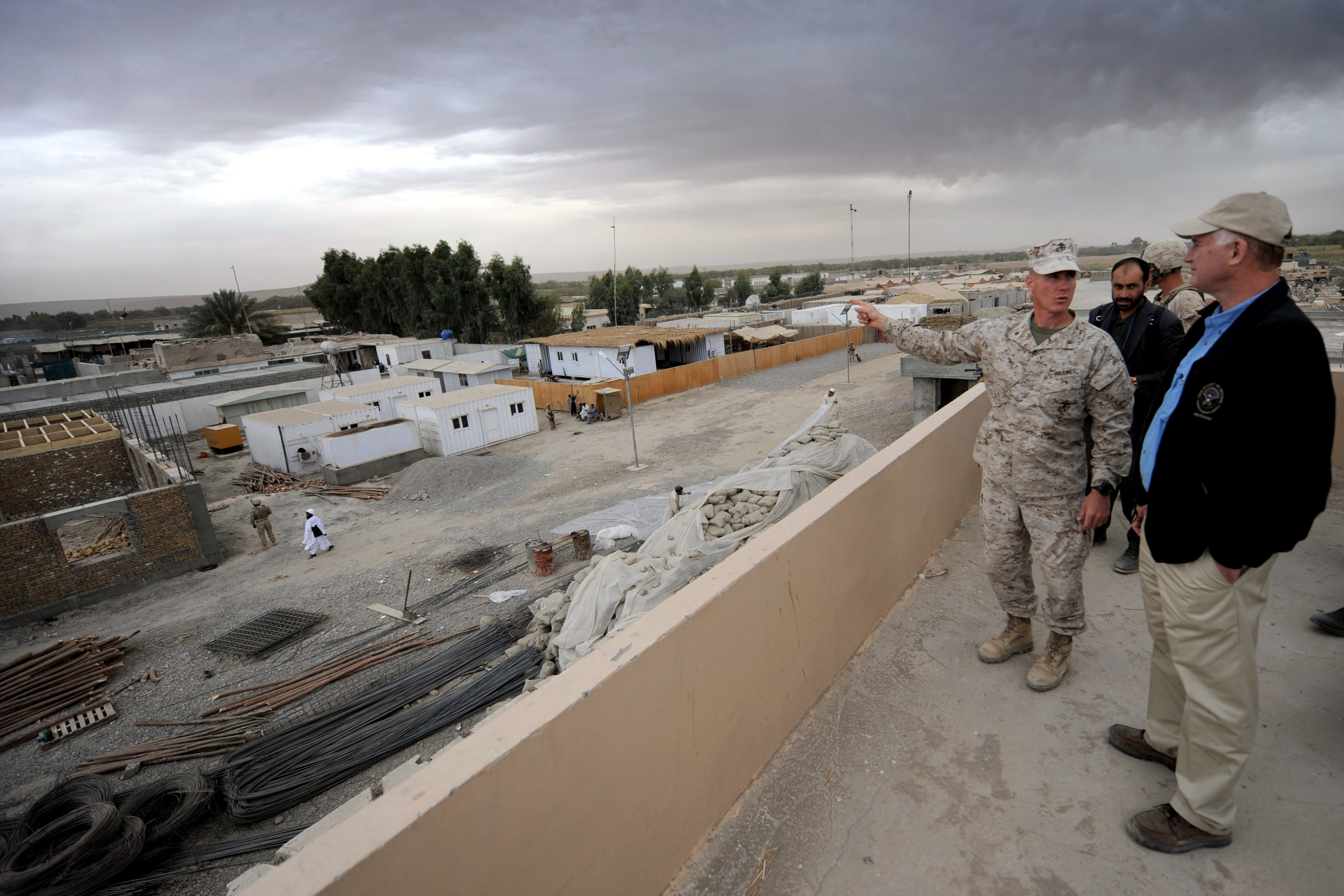
- US Deputy Defense Secretary overlooks Nawa

- Location in Afghanistan
- Coordinates: 31°23′30.53″N 64°19′08.48″E
- Country: Afghanistan
- Province: Helmand Province
- District: Nawa-I-Barakzayi District
- Elevation: 2,441 ft (744 m)
- Time zone: UTC+4:30

Nawa-I-Barakzayi is a village and the district center of Nawa-I-Barakzayi District, Helmand Province, Afghanistan near the Helmand River.

== See also ==
- Nawa-I-Barakzayi District
- Helmand Province
- Helmand River
