= Task Force Leatherneck =

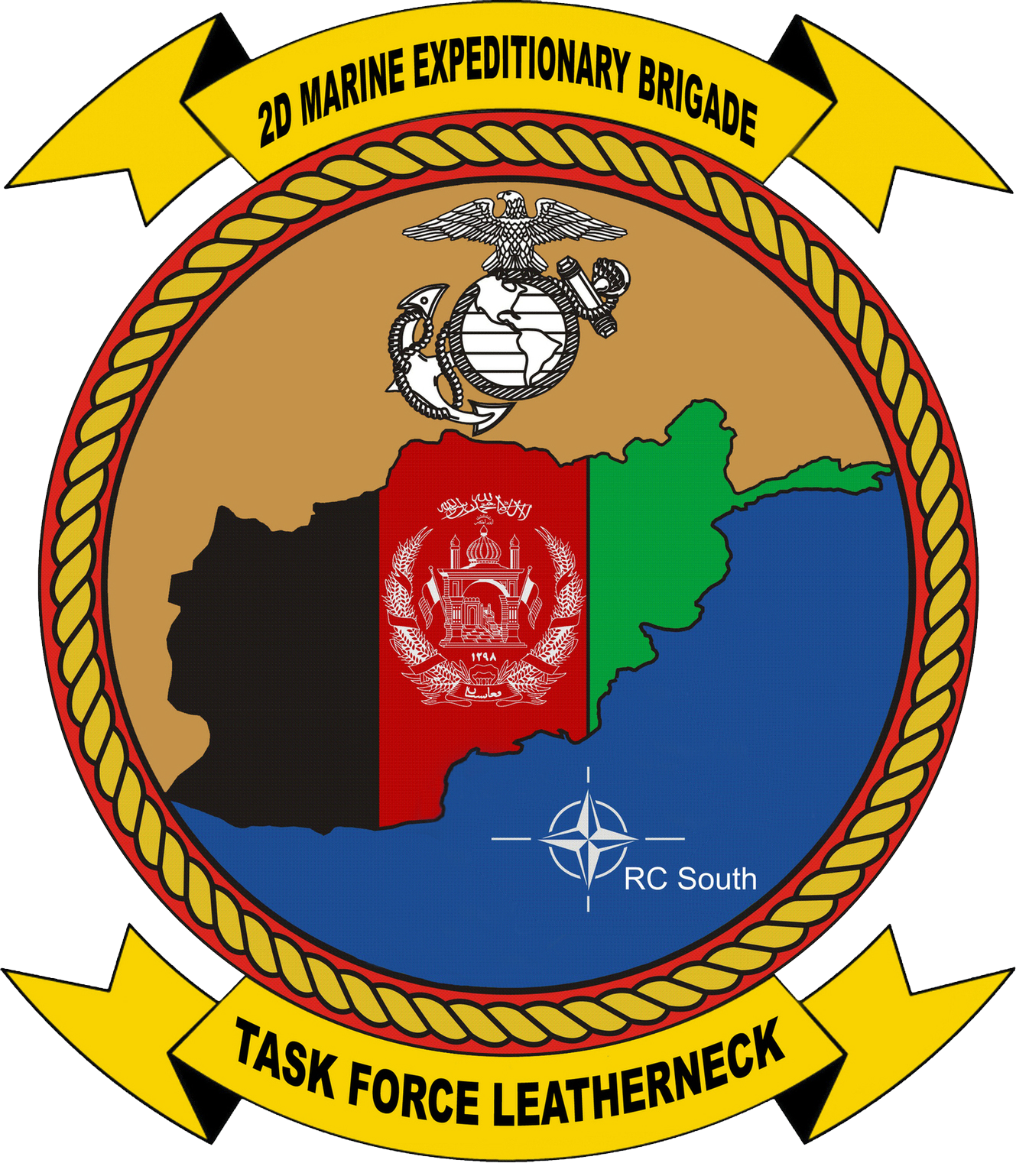
- Task Force Leatherneck Emblem
- Active: 2009-2014
- Country: United States of America
- Branch: United States Marine Corps
- Type: Marine Expeditionary Brigade
- Role: Expeditionary combat forces
- Size: 10,700
- Part of: Regional Command Southwest
- Garrison/HQ: Camp Leatherneck
- Engagements: War in Afghanistan; Helmand province campaign; Operation Strike of the Sword (Operation Khanjar); Battles of Now Zad, Nawa, Trek Nawa, Garmsir, Khanishin; Operation Moshtarak (Operation Together)
- Decorations: Presidential Unit Award

Commanders
- Task Force Commander: Brigadier General Lawrence D. Nicholson

Task Force Leatherneck or MEB-Afghanistan was a Marine Air-Ground Task Force that operated in Helmand Province, Afghanistan. The name was originally given to the 2nd Marine Expeditionary Brigade during its 2009-10 operations for OPERATION ENDURING FREEDOM. On July 3, 2010, it was renamed as Regional Command Southwest, RC(SW)|, and in January 2015 it was renamed Train Advise Assist Command - Southwest (TAAC-SW) under the new NATO mission RESOLUTE SUPPORT. It is also the name used by the 1st Marine Division and 2nd Marine Division during their deployments to Afghanistan. Task Force Leatherneck was commanded by Brigadier General Lawrence D. Nicholson with the command element at Camp Leatherneck. The task force took over the battlespace from Special Purpose MAGTF-Afghanistan on May 29, 2009. In July 2009, Task Force Leatherneck participated in Operation Strike of the Sword (Operation Khanjar), the largest Marine Corps operation since the Battle of Fallujah, and then in February 2010 an even larger battle, the largest of the Afghan Campaign, Operation Moshtarak (Operation Together).

== Order of battle ==
Task Force Leatherneck comprised two regimental combat teams and four separate battalions with approximately 10,700 personnel.

=== Operation Enduring Freedom 9.2 ===
- 2nd Marine Expeditionary Brigade(2nd MEB)/Task Force Leatherneck(TFL)/Feb 2009 - Mar 2010

5th Battalion 10th Marines (5/10th Marines) - Brigade Headquarters Group (BHG)

Headquarters Battery, 5th Battalion, 10th Marines (HQ Battery 5/10th Marines) - Headquarters and Service Company (H&S Company)
F Battery, 2nd Battalion, 10th Marines (Fox 2/10th Marines) - Tactical Combat Force (TFC)
R Battery, 5th Battalion, 11th Marines (Romeo 5/11th Marines) - Tactical Combat Force (TFC)
Military Police Company, (MPC) Headquarters Battalion, 2nd Marine Division(HQ Battalion 2nd Marine Division) - Police Mentoring Teams (PMTs) and Provost Marshal Office (PMO)
34 Squadron, Royal Air Force Regiment (34 Squadron RAF Regiment) - Force Protection Company (FP Company)

3rd Marine Regiment (RCT 3)

2nd Battalion 3rd Marines (2/3rd Marines)
1st Battalion 5th Marines (1/5th Marines)
2nd Battalion 8th Marines (2/8th Marines)
3rd Battalion 11th Marines (3/11th Marines)
BATTERY N 5th Battalion 14th Marines (N/5/14th Marines)

Company D, 2nd Assault Amphibian Battalion (D/2nd AAB)(MRAP Company)
Detachment L, 4th Civil Affairs Group(L/4th CAG)

2nd Light Armored Reconnaissance Battalion (-) (2nd LARB)
Detachment, 2nd Reconnaissance Battalion
Detachment, 2nd Air Naval Gunfire Liaison Company (2nd ANGLICO)
Detachment, 3rd Radio Battalion
Marine Aircraft Group 40(MAG 40)
Combat Logistics Regiment 2(CLR 2)

- 1st Marine Division (Forward)

Headquarters Battalion, 1st Marine Division(HQ Battalion 1st Marine Division)

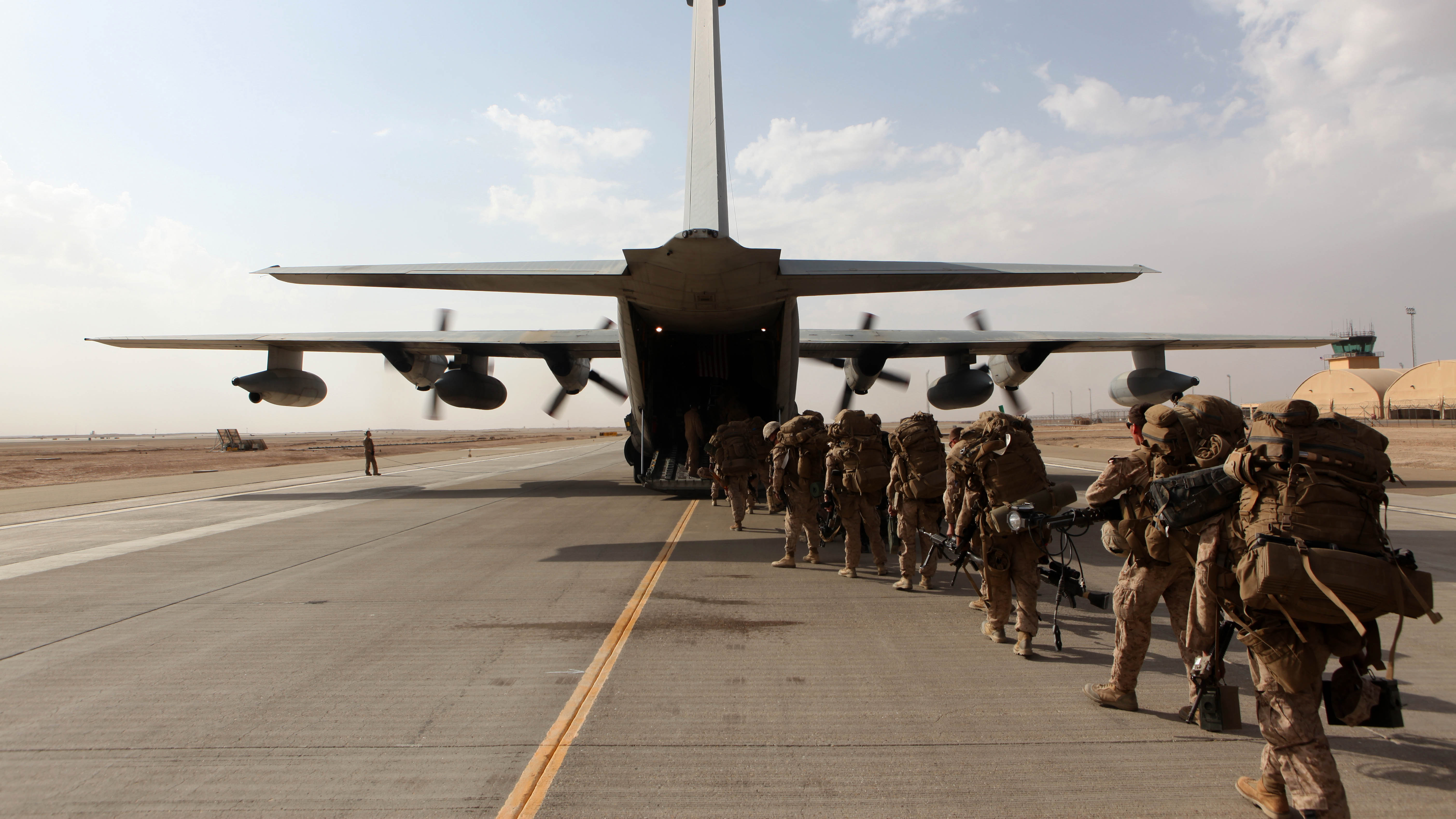
HELMAND PROVINCE, Afghanistan - Marines and sailors with Marine Expeditionary Brigade – Afghanistan load onto a KC-130 aircraft on the Camp Bastion flightline, Oct. 27, 2014. The Marine Corps ended its mission in Helmand province, Afghanistan, the day prior and all Marines, sailors and service members from the United Kingdom withdrew from southwestern Afghanistan. Photo by: SSgt John Jackson

2nd Battalion, 11th Marines(2/11th Marines)
3rd Combat Engineer Battalion(3rd CEB)
1st Reconnaissance Battalion(1st Recon Battalion)

- Regimental Combat Team 5(RCT 5)

2nd Battalion, 9th Marine Regiment(2/9th Marine Regiment)
2nd Battalion, 6th Marine Regiment(2/6th Marine Regiment)
3rd Battalion, 3rd Marine Regiment(3/3rd Marine Regiment)
1st Light Armored Reconnaissance Battalion(1st LARB)
Combat Logistics Battalion 1(CLB 1)

- Regimental Combat Team 6(RCT 6)

1st Battalion, 8th Marines(1/8th Marines)
2nd Battalion, 5th Marines(2/5th Marines)
1st Battalion, 7th Marines(1/7th Marines)
31st Georgian Battalion

=== Operation Enduring Freedom 10.1 ===
- 2nd Marine Expeditionary Brigade(2nd MEB)

5th Battalion 10th Marines (5/10th Marines) - Brigade Headquarters Group (BHG)

Headquarters Battery 3rd Battalion 10th Marines (HQ Battery 3/10) - Headquarters and Service Company (H&S)
Company A, 4th Light Armored Reconnaissance Battalion (Alpha 4th LARB) - Tactical Combat Force (TFC)
Military Police Company, Headquarters Battalion, 1st Marine Division - Police Mentoring Teams (PMTs) and Provost Marshal Office (PMO)
3 Squadron, Royal Air Force Regiment (3 Squadron RAF Regiment) - Force Protection Company (FP Company)

7th Marine Regiment (RCT 7)

1st Battalion 3rd Marines (1/3rd Marines)
3rd Battalion 4th Marines (3/4th Marines)
2nd Battalion 2nd Marines (2/2nd Marines)
3rd Battalion 7th Marines (3/7th Marines)
3rd Battalion 10th Marines (3/10th Marines)
Company B, 2nd Assault Amphibian Battalion (Bravo 2nd AAB) (MRAP Company)
Detachment M, 4th Civil Affairs Group (M/4th CAG)

4th Light Armored Reconnaissance Battalion (-) (4th LAR)
Detachment 3rd Reconnaissance Battalion
Detachment 2nd Air Naval Gunfire Liaison Company (ANGLICO)
Detachments 1st & 3rd Air Naval Gunfire Liaison Company (ANGLICO)
Marine Aircraft Group 40 (MAG 40)
Combat Logistics Regiment 2(CLR 2)

== Commanders ==
- 2nd Marine Expeditionary Brigade between 2009 and March 2010
- Brigadier General Joseph Osterman between March 2010 and March 15, 2011 (1st Marine Division (Forward))
- Brigadier General Lewis A. Craparotta between March 15, 2011 and February 25, 2012 (2nd Marine Division (Forward))
- Brigadier General Lawrence D. Nicholson
