= Golsteyn =

Golsteyn is a surname. Notable people with the surname include:

- Jerry Golsteyn (born 1954), American football player
- Mathew L. Golsteyn, United States Army officer
