= Operation Moshtarak =

Military operation by the ISAF against the Taliban in Afghanistan

- Part of the War in Afghanistan (2001–2021)
Date	February 13, 2010 – December 7, 2010
Location	Marjah, Helmand Province, Afghanistan 31°31′N 64°07′E
Result	Tactically inconclusive: NATO occupation of Marjah district; Taliban recapture Marjah after NATO withdrawal

Belligerents
ISAF: United States; United Kingdom; France; Estonia; Denmark; Canada; Islamic Republic of Afghanistan	Taliban; Al-Qaeda

Commanders and leaders
ISAF (United States) Stanley McChrystal (United States) Lawrence D. Nicholson (United States) Randall Newman (United Kingdom) James Cowan (United Kingdom) Nick Carter (Afghanistan) Mohammad Zazai	Abdul Qayyum Zakir; Abdur Razzaq Akhundzada; Naeem Baraikh; Qari Fasihuddin; Abdullah Nasrat; Mullah Mohammad Basir

Strength
(United States) 4,000 (United Kingdom) 1,200 (up to 4,200 available) (Afghanistan) 2,500 (France) Approx. 70 (Canada) Approx. 61; Total: 15,000+ troops	(Afghanistan) 2,000 insurgents (Taliban claim); 400–1,000 insurgents (U.S. estimate)

Casualties and losses
(United States) 45 killed (Afghanistan) 15+ killed (United Kingdom) 13 killed	(Afghanistan) 120+ killed (first 5 days); 56 captured
- Civilian casualties: 28 killed, 70 injured
- Helmand Province in Afghanistan

Operation Moshtarak (Dari for Together or Joint), also known as the Battle of Marjah, was an International Security Assistance Force (ISAF) pacification offensive in the town of Marjah, Helmand Province, Afghanistan. It involved a combined total of 15,000 Afghan, American, British, Canadian, Danish, and Estonian troops, constituting the largest joint operation of the War in Afghanistan up to that point. The purpose of the operation was to remove the Taliban from Marja, thus eliminating the last Taliban stronghold in central Helmand Province. The main target of the offensive was the town of Marjah, which had been controlled for years by the Taliban as well as drug traffickers.

Although Moshtarak was described as the largest operation in Afghanistan since the fall of the Taliban, it was originally supposed to be the prelude to a much larger offensive in Kandahar that would follow Moshtarak by several months. ISAF chose to heavily publicize the operation before it was launched, comparing its scope and size to the 2004 Second Battle of Fallujah, in the hopes that Taliban fighters in the town would flee.

The operation was also designed to showcase improvements in both the Afghan government and Afghan security forces. ISAF claimed that the operation was "Afghan-led" and would use five Afghan brigades. General Stanley A. McChrystal, the commander of ISAF, also promised that following the offensive ISAF would install a "government in a box" in Marja.

While initially successful, ISAF and the Afghan government failed to set up a working government in the town, leading to a successful resurgence by the Taliban; 90 days into the offensive General McChrystal famously referred to it as a "bleeding ulcer". In October the town was still described as "troubling", but by early December the fighting there was declared "essentially over".

Shortly after the withdrawal of NATO soldiers from Marja, it was reported the Taliban had regained control of the town and district with US army analysts describing the goals of the operation as a failure. It has later been cited as a critical turning point in the war, as its failure led the Obama administration to shift in strategy, away from increasing the number of American combatants for a decisive victory and toward deescalation of the war.

== Strategic meaning ==
The operation was called "a key test" of the coalition strategy against the Taliban insurgency. Brigadier James Cowan, the commander of British forces in Helmand, believed it would mark "the start of the end of this insurgency". At the very least it would become a test of whether the Afghan forces would be able to make their country peaceful and safe.

The announcement of the operation was also a part of this strategy: "shaping the information battlefield strategic communications", and to ensure it would not repeat the destruction of Fallujah in Iraq in 2004. Hours before the offensive began, Afghan and coalition forces dropped leaflets with the message, "Do not allow the Taliban to enter your home".

After this operation in Helmand province, the neighbouring province and the city of Kandahar became a target of American operations. In March 2010, U.S. and NATO commanders released details of plans for the biggest offensive of the war against the Taliban insurgency.

== New war model ==
When launched, the operation was called a "new war model". Afghan and NATO officials had assembled a large team of Afghan administrators and an Afghan governor that would move into Marja after the fighting, with more than 1,900 police standing by. "We've got a government in a box, ready to roll in", said American commander Stanley McChrystal. The capture of Marja was intended to serve as a prototype for a new type of military operation. The Afghan government had pledged to hold any territory seized in the Taliban heartland during the assault. Utilities engineers were on hand to ensure power and water supplies were maintained.

== Timeline of battle ==
=== Background ===
As early as September 2009, Canadian soldiers from 3 Princess Patricia's Canadian Light Infantry began training about 400 Afghan National Army recruits for the operation. Since January 2010, coalition forces had launched smaller "shaping operations" to prepare for the main assault on February 13. One of these operations was a series of "find, fix, strike" raids by four-man SAS teams and U.S. Army Special Forces team ODA 1231. These resulted in the deaths of 50 Taliban leaders in the area according to NATO, but didn't seem to have any real adverse effect on the Taliban's operations. In another operation, the Scots Guards and Grenadier Guards captured a bomb factory and defused 20 IEDs.

The Afghan public was warned of the upcoming operation, in line with new rules of engagement for British forces, called "courageous restraint." The tactic, conceived by U.S. General Stanley McChrystal and British Major General Nick Carter, required soldiers to "use brain-power rather than fire-power" and hoped to reduce damage to the Afghan population (in terms of collateral and life cost) by using fewer munitions and support measures. 11 Light Brigade, the main British formation in Helmand for use in the counter-insurgency role tested the doctrine in some of the more heavily populated areas in Helmand.

The publicity and the new tactics intended to prevent the loss of civilians, and to persuade insurgents to lay down their arms. The operation was the first in Helmand since the surge of 30,000 U.S. troops and additional British reinforcements in late 2009/early 2010.

The main force was the 2nd Marine Expeditionary Brigade (Task Force Leatherneck) as well as British Soldiers from 1 Coldstream Guards Battle Group, 1 Grenadier Guards Battle Group, 1 Royal Welsh Battle Group all supported by Close Support Combat Engineers from 28 Engineer Regiment; elements of the United States Army; and Afghan National Army and Afghan National Police forces.

British Forces focused on the Lashkar Gah district and Nad Ali district, and U.S. forces on the town of Marja. U.S. assault forces included the 1st Battalion, 3rd Marines and 1st Battalion, 6th Marines, 3rd Battalion, 6th Marines, 3rd Battalion, 10th Marines, 2nd Combat Engineer Battalion, and elements of 2nd Assault Amphibian Battalion and 2nd Light Armored Reconnaissance Battalion The operation also intended to cut the opium trade. Its main aim was to ensure that captured ground can be held by British and American troops, enabling the Afghan government and civilian aid agencies and military contractors to work more effectively in the province.

A majority of the US forces were inserted by CH-53 and MV-22 helicopters, while the rest conducted a ground assault. The Canadian Forces focused on the air assault with seven helicopters, including three CH-47 Chinook escorted by four CH-146 Griffon. The Joint Task Force Afghanistan (JTF-Afg) ferried about 1,100 coalition troops to Nad Ali District in the largest air assault ever conducted with Canadian helicopters. 33 other coalition helicopters, supported by fighter jets and uncrewed aerial vehicles, also participated in the operation with a total of 11 waves of troop drops.

Ahead of the military operation, hundreds of civilian families fled Marja and its surroundings and were displaced from their homes due to the offensive by NATO and their Afghan partners. The town was suspected to be "one of the biggest, most dangerous minefields NATO forces have ever faced," and hundreds of the beleaguered insurgents could insist to fight until death.

=== Late December and Early January ===
By early January the surge forces which President Obama had announced on December 1, 2009, had arrived in country. The bulk of the Marine forces included the 1st and 3rd Battalion of the 6th Marine Regiment. They quickly setup command at Camp Dwyer, south of Marjah. They were joined with Afghan Army units and began training and preparing for their mission in Marjah. At the same time a small task force, A SQN The Household Cavalry Regiment would begin to secure the main road from Lashkargah around local police compounds at the main t-junction, which divides the main road North to Nad-e-Ali and South to Marjah. With 3 Troop tasked to move on a dirt track in a 12-man team in Scimitar's and 2 pick up's with a Tiger Team SF team, to prove a potential cross country route towards Marjah and probe the Taliban in the Bolan Desert in the weeks leading up to the Moshtarak.

=== Late January and Early February ===
As the assault drew near, US and coalition forces began to encircle the city in order to screen those entering and exiting, gather intelligence, and deceive the enemy as to the avenue of approach for the well publicized assault. 1st Battalion, 6th Marines moved command to Fire Base Fiddlers Green, home of 3rd Battalion, 10th Marines just southeast of Marjah, the 3rd Battalion, 6th Marines built temporary Camp Belleau Wood just northwest of the city, and Bravo Company, 2nd Assault Amphibian Battalion and Alpha Company, 2nd Light Armored Reconnaissance Battalion filled the desert to the west.

At the same time a small task force, A SQN The Household Cavalry Regiment (HCR) would begin to secure the main road from Lashkargah around local police compounds at the main t-junction, which divides the main road North to Nad-e-Ali and South to Marjah. With 3 Troop tasked to move in a 12-man team in 4 Scimitar's and 2 pick up's with a Tiger Team SF team, to prove a potential off-road route towards Marjah from the East and probe the Taliban in the Bolan Desert in the weeks leading up to the Moshtarak. In these weeks 3 Troop would encounter resistance each day and found dozens of IED's along the route. Sleeping next to the vehicles at night left allowed them to stay mobile but the Taliban were determined to no avail. At the same time 2 TP HCR (12 man team) would encounter a force of 35 Taliban moving South to Marjah, stopping them with help from Apache support.

=== February 9, 2010 (D-4) ===
In preparation for the major offensive, 1st Battalion, 3rd Marines seized the "Five Points" junction east of Marja on the road to Lashkar Gah. Elements of Charlie Company were inserted by air under cover of darkness, while elements of Bravo Company, along with 1/3's Combat Engineer Platoon, traveled 9 kilometers on foot from their bases in the Nawa district, sweeping the road for explosive devices. Also Route Clearance Platoons clearing routes from their respective staging locations (In the Desert or Cop) into pre-specified locations and intersections from the East West North and South(a "Breach Point" at the Southern tip of the City in a specific instance(Breaching a canal with a bulldozer and a Fasseen type bridge gaining access to the much sought after city((RCP3 Attached/Embedded into ODA 3121)) While repelling Taliban assaults, the Marines built a combat outpost, completed on February 14, that they named COP Reilly. The 1/3 Marines held COP Reilly and the northeastern outer sector of Marjah until February 25, when Kilo Company, 3rd Battalion, 6th Marines arrived to take control of the position.

=== February 11, 2010 (D-2) ===
On February 11, forces staged all around the city and at the major airbases ready for the next day's assault. Hours before midnight the Afghan President Hamid Karzai had given his personal approval for the operation, that had been delayed for 24 hours as Afghan officials entered last minute negotiations with insurgents.

=== February 12, 2010 (D-1) ===
February 12 was the original D-day, but after a 24-hour delay to for negotiations, forces were on a standout and had one extra day for preparation.

=== February 13, 2010 (D-Day) ===
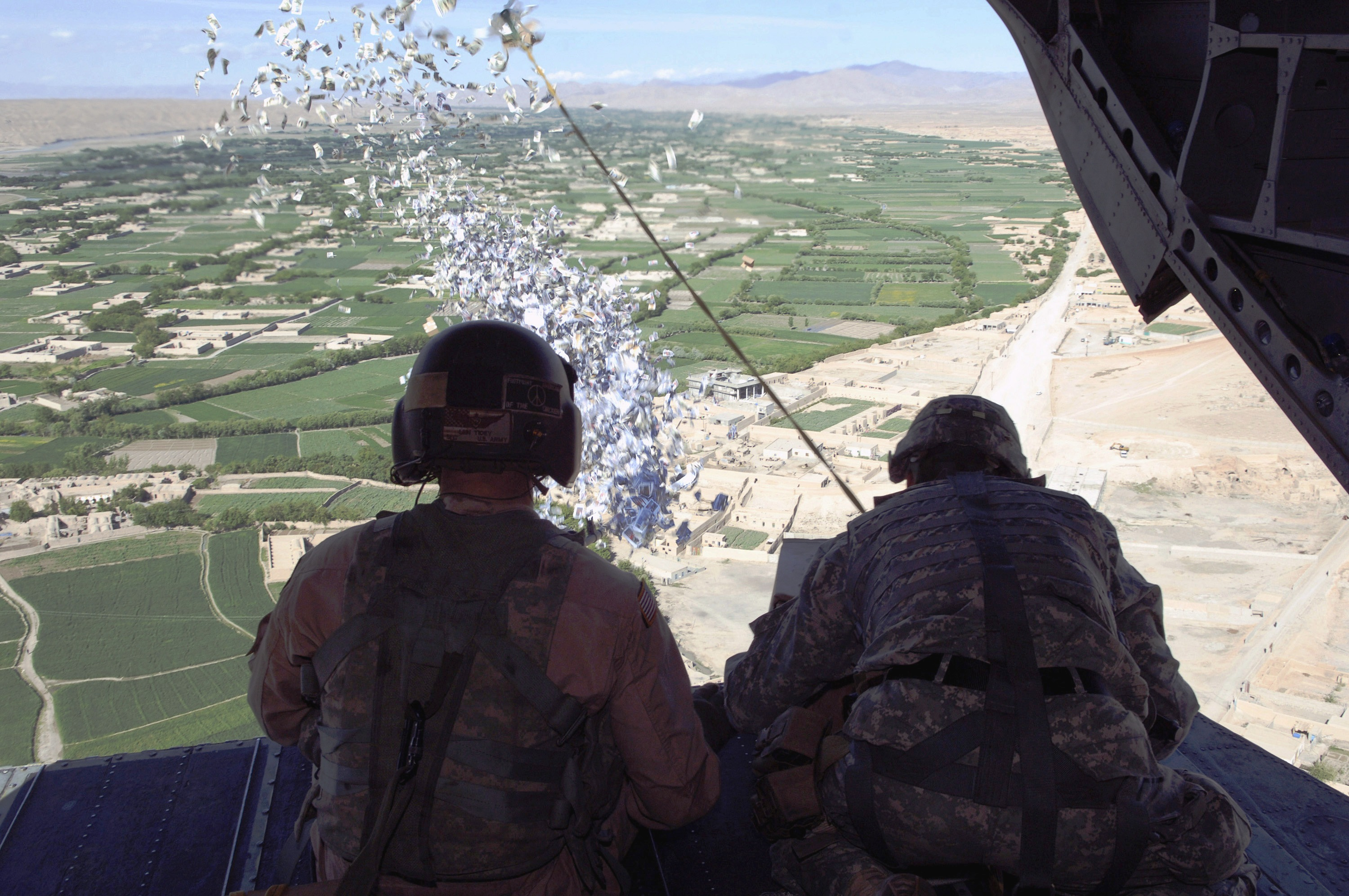
February 12, 2010, distribution of leaflets over Helmand Province by the U.S. military

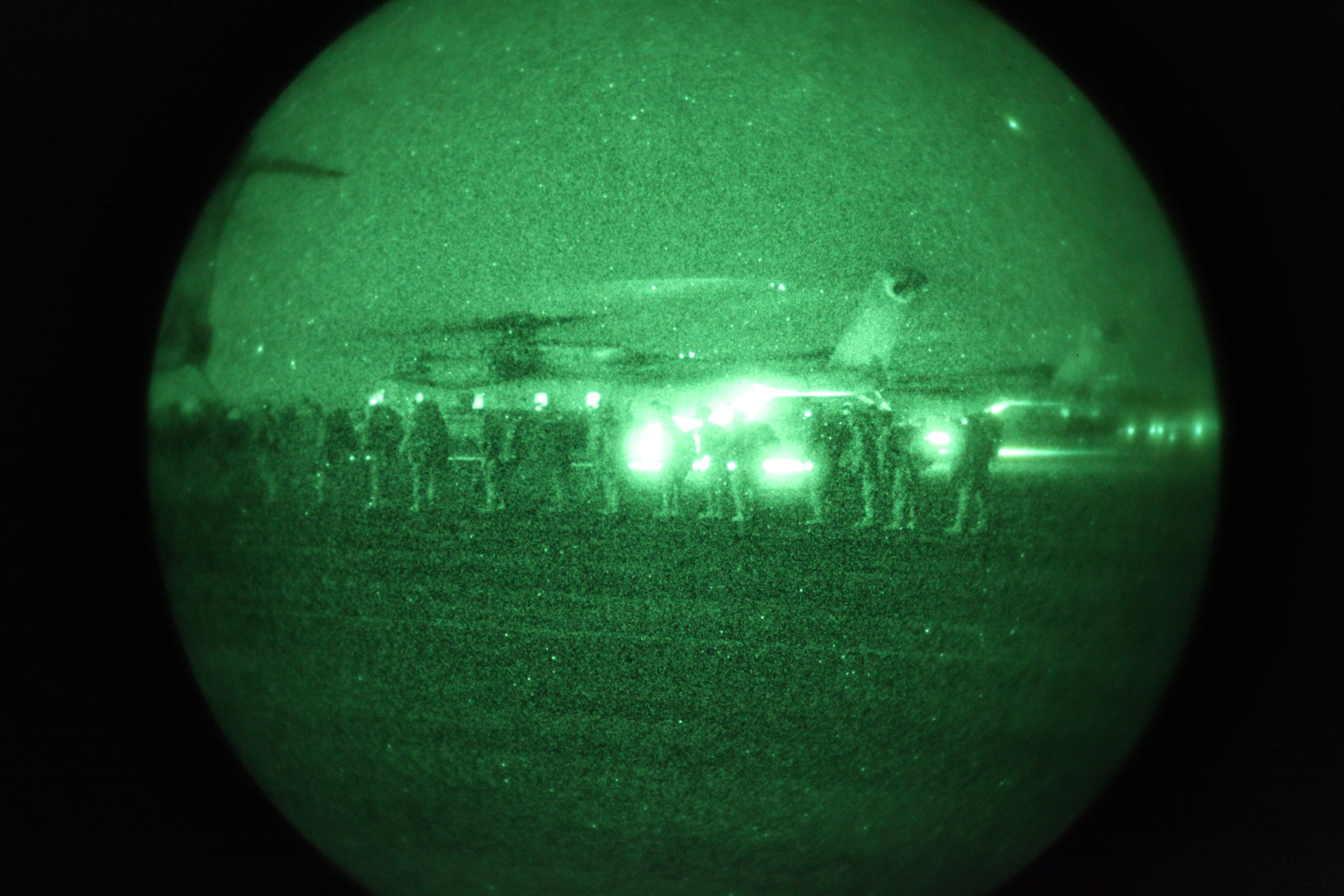
1st Battalion, 6th Marines board CH-53E Super Stallion on February 13.

Hours before dawn, US and Afghan special operations forces inserted into two key target sites in the southwest corner of Marjah. They would be isolated until Marines, Soldiers, and Afghani troops from Task Force 3/4/205 could link up. Just prior to dawn, the landing waves of helicopters across central Helmand marked the start of the major offensive. Third Battalion, 6th Marines were inserted into the northern part of the city and 1st Battalion, 6th Marines in the center of the city. In the southern edge, Task force 3/4/205 conducted a ground breach and companies of 1st Battalion, 6th Marines also conducted a ground breach from the southeast.

On February 13, two hours before dawn at 4 am local time the first of 90 Chinook and Huey helicopters disgorged a force of British, Afghan and French troops. The US Special Forces ODA's 1231 and ODA 3121 had been on the ground for hours prior to the main push seizing control of their objectives. The Special Forces then advanced north into the city meeting heavy resistance and capturing further objectives. The advance into Marja was slowed during the morning through poppy fields lined with home-made explosives and other land mines.

The first kills were reported to be made by uncrewed Predator aircraft and AH-64 Apache attack helicopters, targeting insurgents seen laying roadside bombs and setting up anti-aircraft guns. At 2 am local time the troops from the U.S. Marine Corps seized a series of canal crossings south of Nad-e-Ali.

Within minutes, the U.S., British and Afghan special forces seized and secured dozens of helicopter landing sites. Most notably U.S. Army Special Forces ODA 1231 along with Afghan Commandos from 3rd Commando Kandak took control of the southern tip of the city, being the first boots on the ground. At 2:25 am Chinooks approached, flown by pilots with night vision equipment and guided by infrared flares, dropped from U.S. Marine KC-130's. At about 4 am, RAF Chinooks full of soldiers from the 1st battalion the Royal Welsh left Camp Bastion, the main British base in Helmand, for the Pegasus landing zone in the Taliban stronghold of Showal in the Chah-e-Anjir area.

At the same time the British Manoeuvre Support Group consisting of the Viking Gp, Close Support Armoured Engineers (including the first deployment of Trojan Armoured vehicles) and Route opening capabilities departed for the Op Moshtarak AO. While the British force began to secure their area, a 1,000-strong combined force of members of the U.S. Marine Corps and the Afghan National Army landed in Marja. During the following 90 minutes, more Marines arrived in waves of CH-53 Super Stallion transport helicopters. By daybreak, hundreds more soldiers began to enter the area by land, using mobile bridges and Assault Breacher Vehicles.

Major General Nick Carter, commander of NATO Regional Command South in southern Afghanistan, said Afghan and coalition troops made a "successful insertion" without incurring any casualties. While the U.S. Marines and Afghan soldiers stormed the town of Marja, British, American and Canadian forces struck in the Nad Ali district. General Sher Mohammad Zazai, commander of the Afghan troops in the south, said Afghan and NATO forces had established positions in 11 of 13 targeted areas in and around Marja and were slowly pushing forward.

When invading Marja, the invading troops confiscated caches of weapons and ammunition. The greatest obstacle was the extensive network of mines and booby traps. The assault troops were reported to run into "a huge number" of improvised explosive devices when crossing a canal into the town's northern entrance. Marines and Army used portable aluminium bridges to span the irrigation channels. Mobile bridges enabled the safe crossing of the main canal into Marja, since the existing bridge was expected to be rigged with explosives. Marine engineers moved forward in special mine-clearing Assault Breacher Vehicles. These 72-ton, 40-foot-long (12 m) vehicles, fitted with a 15-foot-wide (4.6 m) plow supported by metallic skis that glide on the dirt, and nearly 7,000 pounds (3,200 kg) of explosives, ploughed a path through fields and dug a safety lane through the numerous minefields laid by the Taliban. To clear minefields and ignite roadside bombs, the Marines also launched rockets which deploy cables of plastic explosives, called M58 MICLIC.

On the first day of the operation, Qari Yousef Ahmadi, a spokesman of the Taliban, said that insurgents were still resisting in Marja in hit-and-run tactics against ISAF forces. Mullah Mohammed had told ABC News that the Taliban were retreating to reduce civilian casualties. By nightfall, it was claimed by ISAF sources that Marines "appeared to be in control" of the centre of Marja.

British forces moving into the Nadi Ali and western Babaji regions encountered small 'stay-behind' pockets of resistance, although most Taliban fighters had already retreated to other areas in Helmand. Number One Company of the 1st Battalion Coldstream Guards advanced several kilometers into the region on foot from Patrol Base 4 in Babaji. The guardsmen manpacked FGM-148 Javelin missiles which were used decisively to defeat the Taliban resistance left in the area.

Gulab Mangal, the governor of Helmand, said it was "the most successful operation we have ever carried out", but warned that the complete military operation could take a month. However, General McChrystal later called the offensive in Marja a "bleeding ulcer" after 90 days into the offensive.

=== February 14, 2010 (D+1) ===
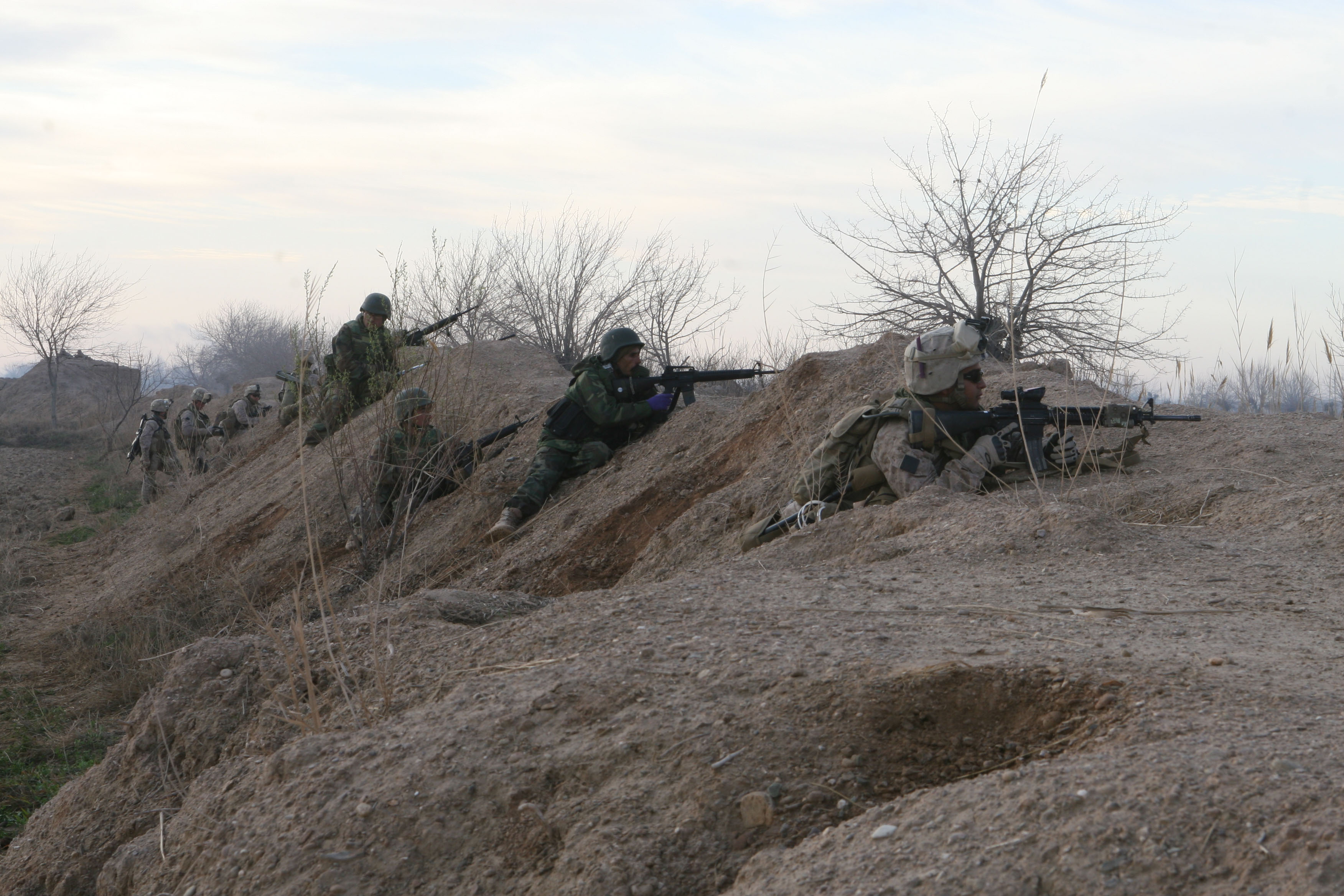
Marines and Afghan National Army soldiers take cover in Marja on February 13.

On the morning of February 14, 2010, a report of the Australian newspaper Herald Sun under the headline "Opium city captured" claimed the seizure of Marjah, "source of most of the world's opium", by the Afghan and ISAF forces. However, Reuters reported that a small flag-raising ceremony at one of the Afghan and ISAF compounds on the morning of February 14 drew gunfire, suggesting that the insurgents remained defiant. After American, Afghan and British troops seized crucial positions, having first overwhelmed most immediate resistance, they encountered "intense but sporadic" fighting as they began house-to-house searches.

The pattern suggested that the hardest fighting was still to come. According to American commanders the troops had achieved every first-day objective, including advancing into the city itself and seizing strategic points like intersections, government buildings and one of the city's bazaars in the center. The following searching door to door for weapons and insurgents is expected to last at least five days, with possibly hundreds of bombs and booby-traps in houses and on roads and footpaths as the biggest concern.

On this second day of the operation British troops pushed through Showal, the town that for the last two years was under the control of insurgents who used it as a staging post to build bombs and to train their fighters to plant them. In factory raids explosives for numerous improvised explosive devices were seized. Not only bomb-making equipment, but also drugs and heroin-processing chemicals were found in surrounding field belonging to Opium farmers. Among the drugs seized were 17 tons of black tar opium, 74 tons of opium poppy seeds, 400 pounds (180 kg) of hashish and 443 pounds (201 kg) of heroin.

Twelve civilians, 10 of whom were from the same family, were killed when civilian houses in Marja were struck by two rockets fired by a NATO High Mobility Artillery Rocket System (HIMARS). All use of the rocket system was stopped by NATO commanders, the American general McChrystal telephoned Afghan President Hamid Karzai to apologize for what he called the "unfortunate incident" and the latter called for an investigation. Major General Nick Carter stated however that the rockets were on target and the house was used by the Taliban for staging attacks.

=== February 15, 2010 (D+2) ===
On the morning of the third day of the operation, the American general Stanley McChrystal visited the former "insurgent capital" of Showal, where after two years the white flag of the Taliban was replaced with the red, green and black national flag. While the British 50-square-mile (130 km^{2}) sector of northern Nad-e-Ali had fallen easily, the American troops were still pushing through Marja a few miles away where the insurgents are putting up a "final stand".

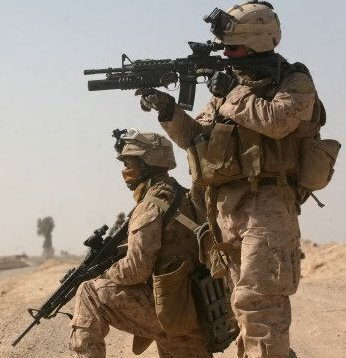
Cpl Ducote and Lcpl Cooper 3rd Bn 6th Mar India Company

According to American and Afghan commanders, the number of insurgents in the area had dropped by about half. About a quarter of the 400 Taliban fighters estimated to be in Marja at the beginning of the operation had been killed. Another quarter appeared to have retreated to other areas or have fled the area, including some of the commanders. In Marja itself fighting continued in two areas, at the northern end of the district and at the center.

=== February 16, 2010 (D+3) ===
After the town of Showal was captured following the launch of Operation Moshtarak, a threat was perceived by the ISAF forces of suicide or other bombing attacks by insurgents, attempting to reassert their presence in defiance of the media focus on the town's recapture.

=== February 18, 2010 (D+5) ===
On February 18, 2010, Afghan soldiers raised the Afghan national flag over the badly damaged bazaar in Marja which had been the target of ISAF and Afghan army attacks, after driving back Taliban snipers on their third attempt, witnessed by the top Afghan general in Helmand and the provincial governor. The same day, there were reports about a meeting of Afghan government officials with Taliban representatives in the Maldives that had taken place at the end of January.

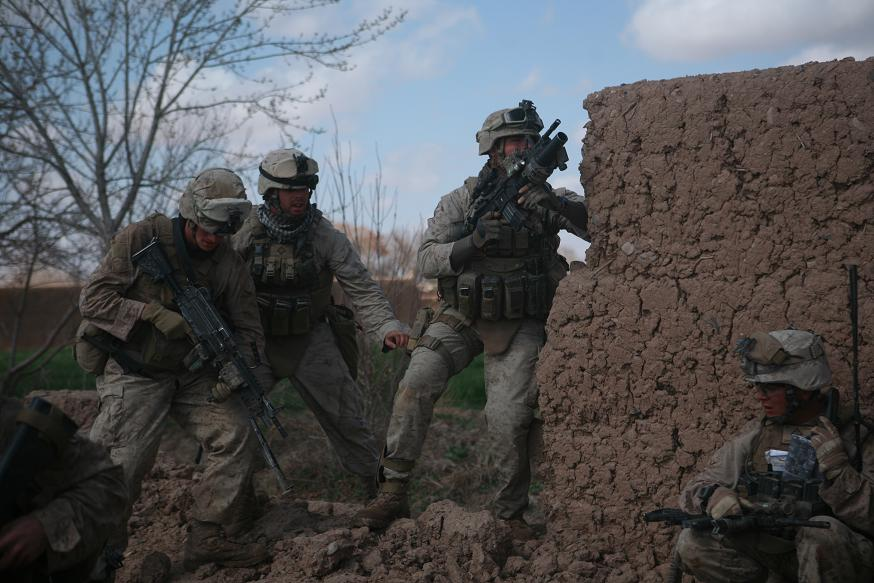
U.S. Marines with Bravo Company, 1st Battalion, 6th Marine Regiment return fire on enemy forces in Marja.

In the south of the city near the Balakino Bazaar, where soldiers and Marines from Task Force 3/4/205 had been clearing since D-day, a major fight broke out as they struggled to clear the last major intersection. Members of Army Special Forces ODA 3121 along with Marine engineers and partnered Afghan commandos began to fight their way west from the Balakino Bazaar (Objective Thunderdome, what would be called COP McQueary and later COP Azadi) to the last major Taliban Intersection (Objective Olympia). At the same time, Marines from 3rd Platoon, Bravo Company, 2nd AABn (aka MRAP Company) pushed north towards Olympia from COP Radford at the southern entrance of the city.

Encountering heavy rocket-propelled grenade, small arms, and indirect fire the forces moved into the intersection which consisted of a small bazaar and International Red Cross clinic, surrounded by several canals and guarded by fighting bunkers. Once the intersection was secured, the engineers began clearing the areas of IEDs. When clearing the bazaar, opening a booby-trapped door triggered an explosion, killing Lance Corporal Larry Johnson and Sergeant Jeremy McQueary, both of 2nd Combat Engineer Battalion, and wounded five other Marines. MRAP Company occupied the intersection and eventually developed COP Olympia. For his actions leading the assault to COP Olympia, Army Staff Sergeant Corey Calkins was awarded the Army Distinguished Service Cross (Navy Cross equivalent), which is the second-highest medal awarded in Marjah.

Following the explosion of the booby-trapped door the Marines and other nearby US forces inspected nearby homes, and apprehended an individual from a home they thought contained material that could be used to construct a bomb. A cooperative local elder identified the prisoner as a member of the Taliban. In 2015 Mathew Golsteyn was discharged from the Army, and had a letter of reprimand left in his personnel file, over the death of this prisoner. During a 2016 interview, on FOX News Golsteyn provided a description of the prisoner's death that led to murder charges, in December 2018.

=== February 25, 2010 (D+12) ===
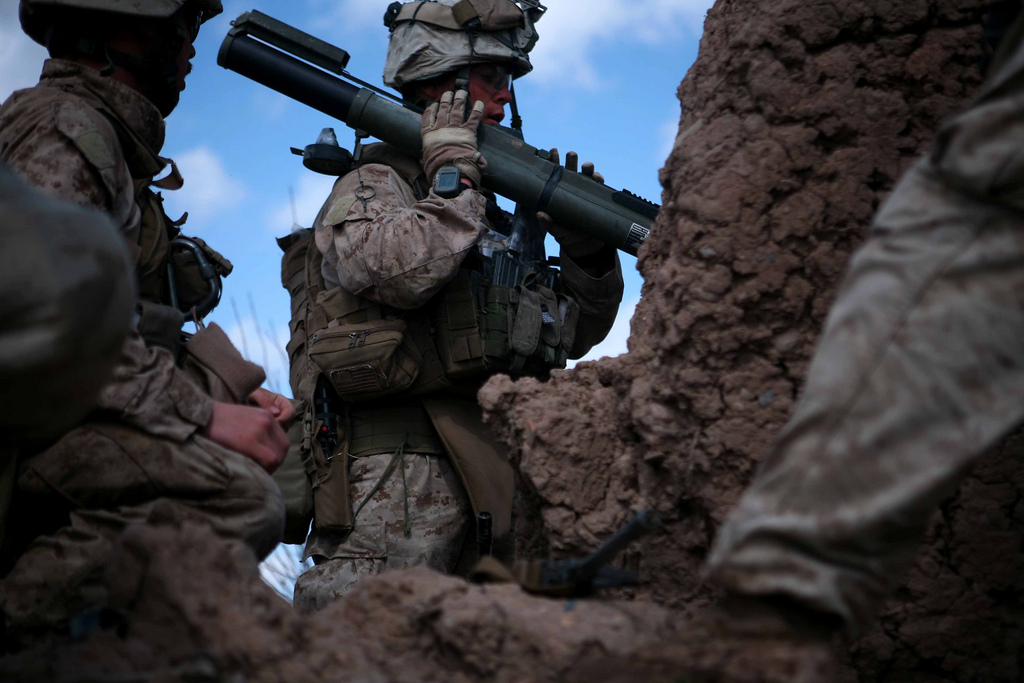
A Marine with Bravo Company, 1st Battalion, 6th Marine Regiment return fire on enemy forces in Marjah using an M72 LAW.

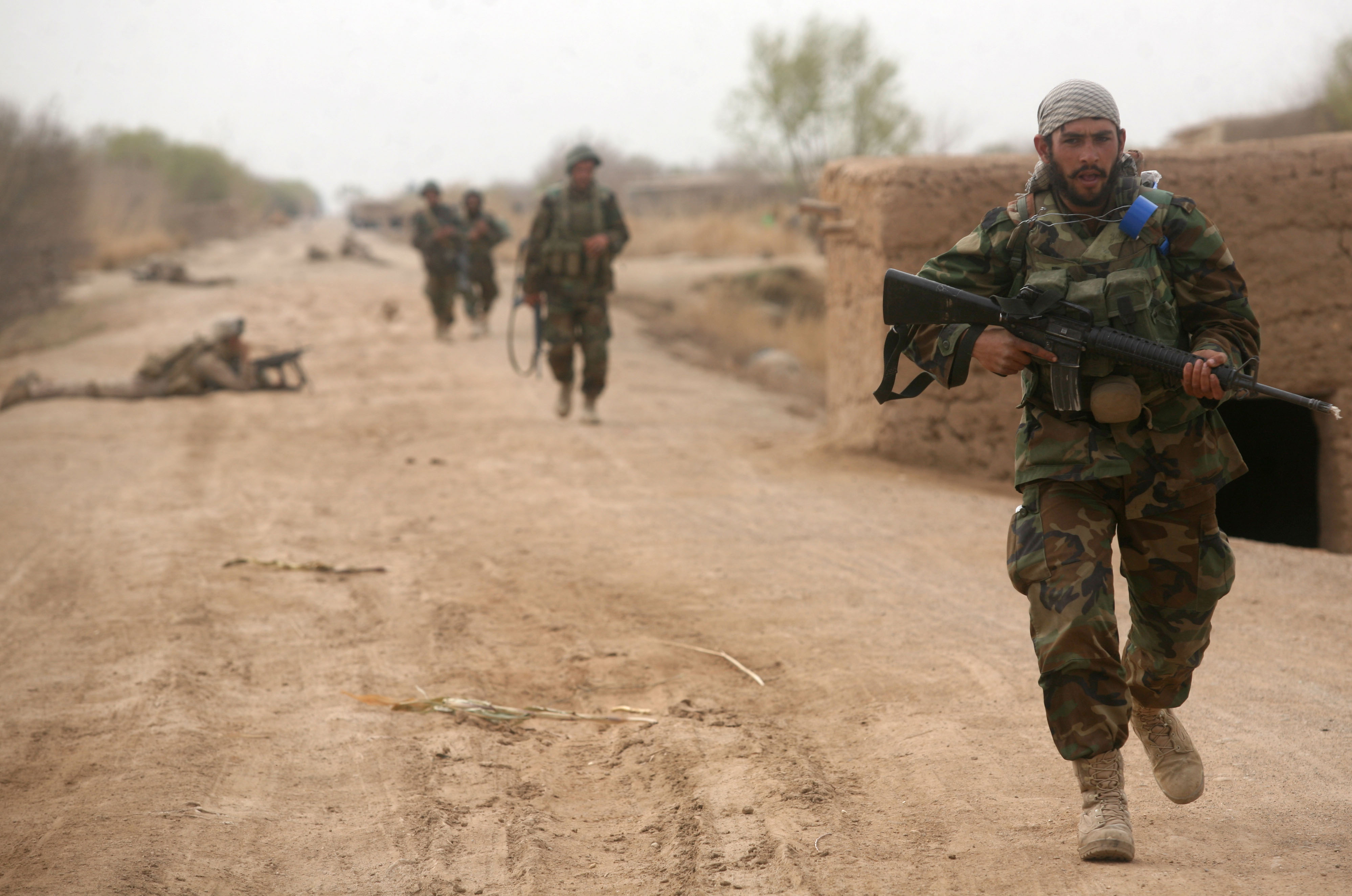
ANA soldiers on their way to clear a compound in Marjah during Operation Moshtarak.

After 12 days, on the morning of February 25, 2010, there was another flag rising ceremony. The Australian newspaper The Sydney Morning Herald reported that an AFP photographer mentioned the rising of the Afghan flag on a building at the Marja bazaar by Mohammad Gulab Mangal, governor of Helmand province, watched by Brigadier General Larry Nicholson, the commander of the US Marines in southern Afghanistan. This ceremony was attended by a crowd of several hundred inhabitants of the 125,000 inhabitants of the town and was guarded by US Marine snipers positioned on the roofs of buildings. Nicholson and Mangal, accompanied by Major General Nick Carter, the British commander of NATO forces in southern Afghanistan, arrived in Marja early that day by helicopter from Camp Bastion.

=== March 16, 2010 ===
On March 16, 2010, an assessment by the Afghan Red Crescent Society (ARCS) claimed that the conflict in Marja had left 35 civilians dead, 37 injured, and 55 houses destroyed – without specifying which side killed how many civilians. Except for some "small pockets of resistance", Taliban fighters had been driven out of the town, but many inhabitants were struggling to return to some kind of normality. Before and during the military operation they were promised rapid aid, but some three weeks after the end of the offensive local people said that they had yet to receive any meaningful assistance.

=== March 20, 2010 ===
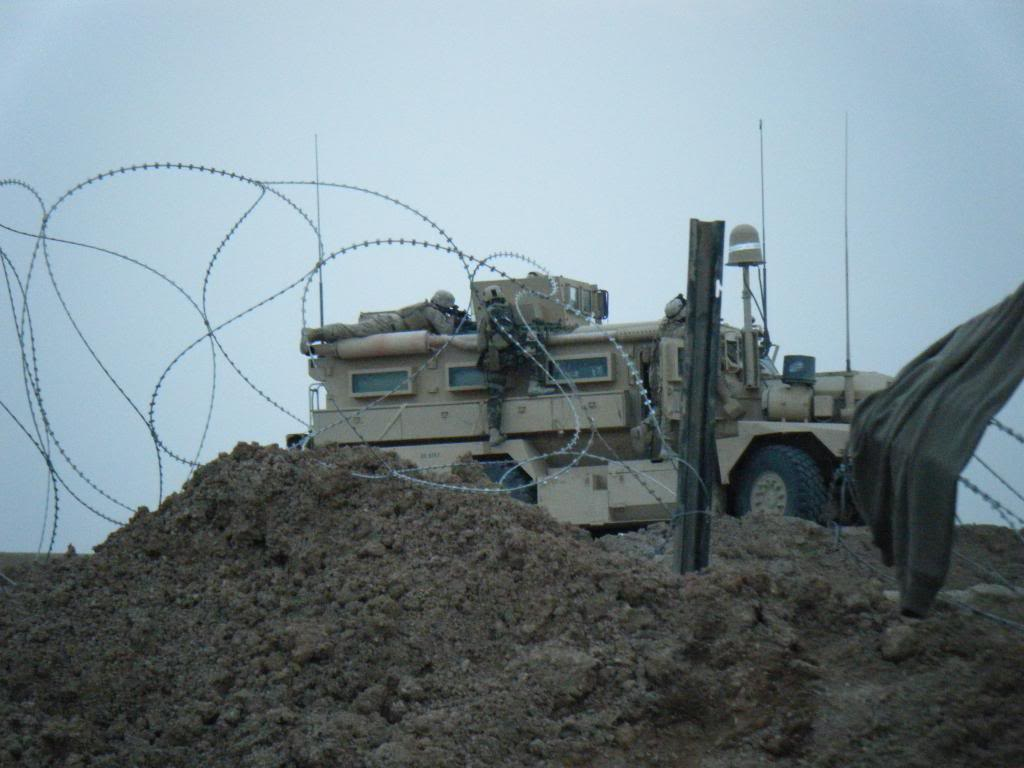
Marines from Bravo Company, 2nd Assault Amphibian Battalion return fire on the Taliban during Operation Moshtarak.

According to reports, sniper fire and bomb explosions in Marja three or four times daily were a sign that the insurgents had not given up despite losing control of the town. New bombs were planted every night, even though Marines said they could dismantle most of them. Lt. Col. Calvert Worth, commander of the 1st Battalion, 6th Marine Regiment, said that his troops found or hit more than 120 homemade bombs in their first 30 days in Marja.

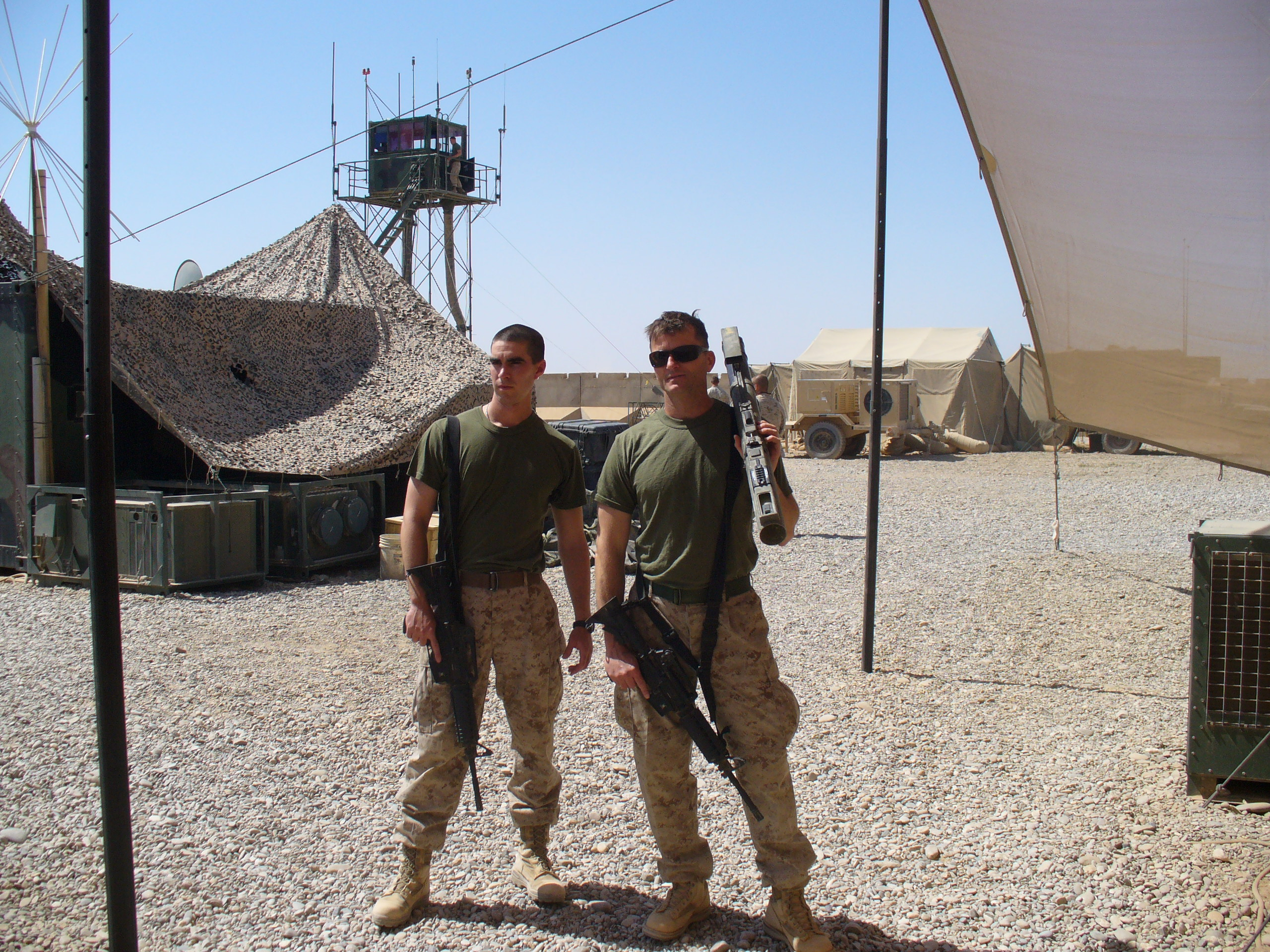
Marine Officers Lieutenant Brian Irizarry and Captain Stalnaker at Camp Dwyer, Helmand at the conclusion of Operation Moshtarak

=== June 2010 ===
Four months after the start of the operation, a lack of security for local population cooperating with ISAF troops and the eruption of gun battles "almost daily" have been reported. Four months after the offensive the former Taliban stronghold, that was intended to become a showpiece of what Western military might and ramped-up Afghan government services could accomplish, became something of a cautionary tale. Insurgents undermined a return to normal life, intimidating bakers who supplied American troops.

=== December 7, 2010 ===
Operation Moshtarak was declared officially over and the city secured. However, fighting between Coalition troops and the Taliban would continue in the Marjah region until 2013.

== Coalition and Taliban casualties ==
As of February 18, Coalition forces have not released, or given any more statements about estimates of Taliban casualties during this operation. In the first five days of fighting an anonymous US intelligence source estimated at least 120 Taliban fighters were killed engaging Coalition and Afghan forces in Marja during the operation.

By early December, 61 US, UK and Afghan soldiers were reported killed in the district as part of the operation. However, the Afghan national army almost never gave out their fatality figures so the number of Coalition dead could be higher.

The numbers of Coalition and Taliban wounded in action have not been released or publicly estimated thus far.

== Poppy dilemma ==
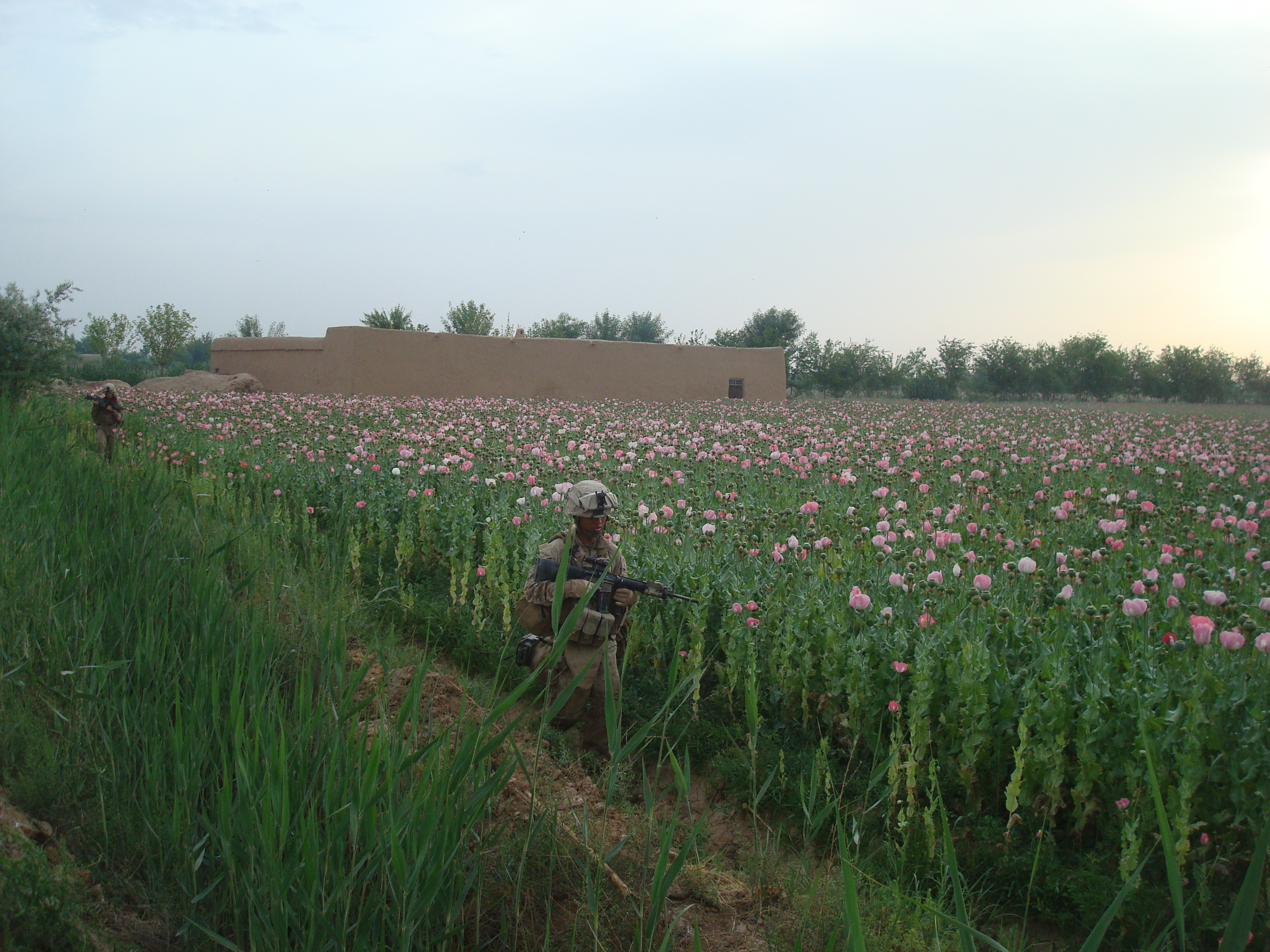
U.S. Marines with Charlie Company, 1st Battalion, 6th Marine Regiment patrol the poppy fields in Marja.

After the ousting of the Taliban, the American and NATO commanders were confronted with the dilemma of on the one hand the need for "winning the hearts and minds" of the local population as well as on the other hand the necessity of the eradication of poppies and the destruction of the opium economy, that allegedly financed the Taliban insurgency. Since opium is the main source of existence of 60 to 70 percent of the farmers in Marja, American Marines were ordered to preliminarily ignore the crops to avoid trampling their livelihood.

== Initial assault order of battle ==
The following order of battle was taken from an ISAF press release:

A combined force of 15,000 is involved in Operation Moshtarak. This combined force includes: Approximately five brigades of Afghan forces, including members of the Afghan National Army, Afghan National Police, Afghan Commandos and the Afghan National Civil Order Police.

- ISAF Regional Command South elements, with forces drawn from the United States, the United Kingdom, Denmark, Estonia and Canada. These elements include:

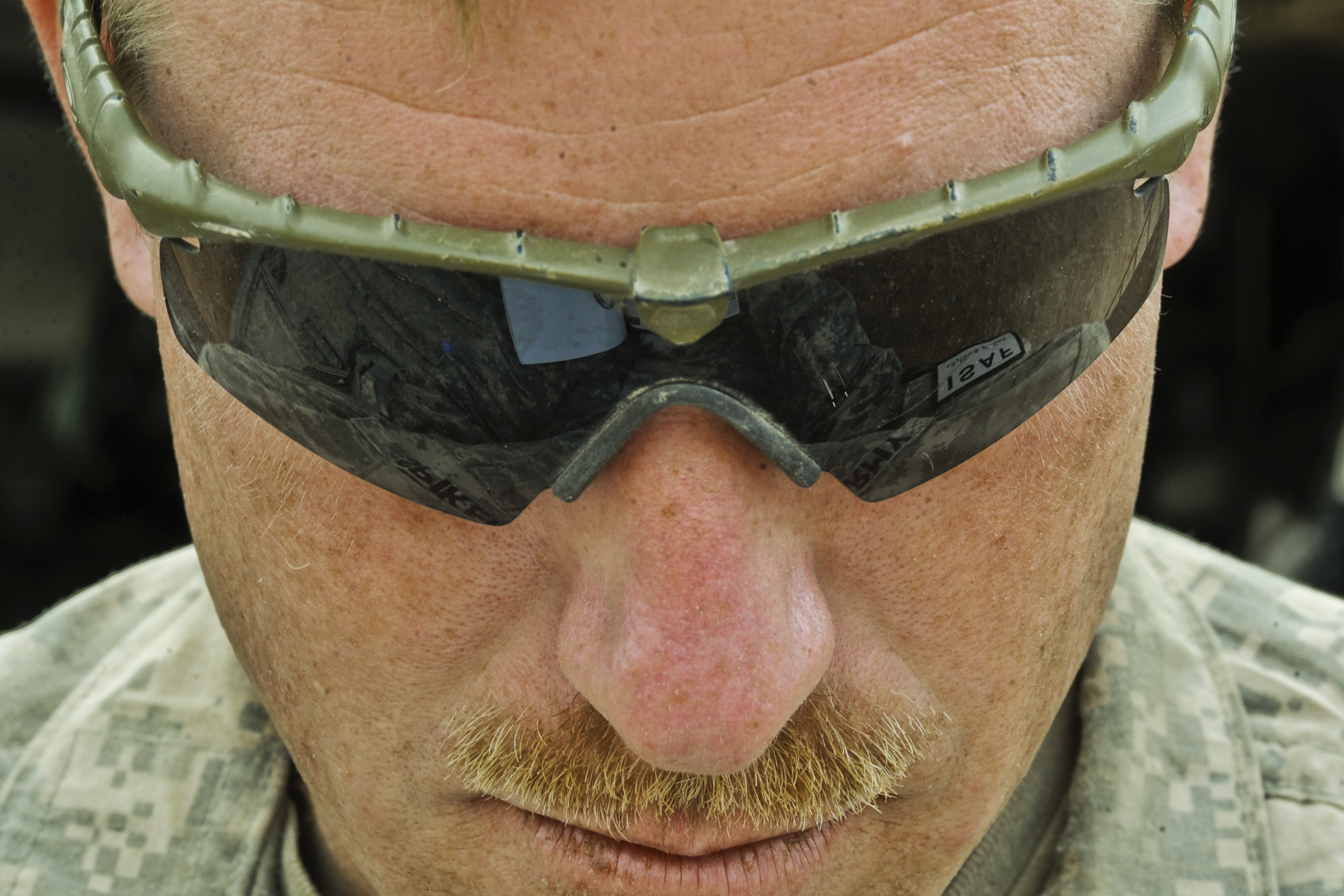
A US Army soldier of 1st Battalion, 17th Infantry Regiment during Operation Moshtarak

REGIONAL COMMAND SOUTH

2ND MARINE EXPEDITIONARY BRIGADE (Task Force Leatherneck) (USMC)

- Brigade Headquarters Group (5th Battalion, 10th Marines)
  - 3rd Radio Battalion followed by 1st Radio Battalion (USMC)
  - 1st Air Naval Gunfire Liaison Company (ANGLICO) (USMC)
  - Det, 4th Civil Affairs Group (USMC)
- 7th Marine Regiment (USMC)
  - 1st Battalion, 6th Marines (USMC)
  - Company F, 2nd Battalion, 5th Marines attached to 1/6 (USMC)
  - 1st Battalion, 3rd Marines (USMC)
  - 3rd Battalion, 6th Marines (USMC)
  - 4th Battalion, 23rd Infantry (Stryker) (US Army)
  - 3rd Battalion, 10th Marines (USMC) (155mm artillery)
  - 5th Battalion, 11th Marines (USMC) (HIMARS rockets)
  - 3d Kandak (Battalion), 4th Brigade, 205th Corps (Afghan)
  - 2nd Combat Engineer Battalion (USMC)
  - Company A, 1st Battalion, 17th Infantry Regiment (US Army)
  - Company A, 2nd Light Armored Reconnaissance Battalion (Det-) (USMC)
  - 3rd & HQ Platoon, Company B, 2nd Assault Amphibian Battalion (provisional rifle platoon) (MRAP Company) (USMC)
  - 1st Platoon, Company B, 1st Combat Engineer Battalion (USMC)
  - Operational Detachment Alpha-3121, 3rd Special Forces Group (US Army)
- Combat Logistics Regiment 2 (USMC)
  - HQ, Combat Logistics Regiment 2 (USMC)
  - 7th Engineer Support Battalion (USMC)
  - 8th Engineer Support Battalion (USMC)
  - Combat Logistics Battalion 1(USMC)
- Marine Aircraft Group 40 (USMC)
  - Marine Light Attack Helicopter Squadron 367 (AH-1 Cobra/UH-1 Huey)
  - Marine Attack Squadron 231 (AV-8B Harrier)
  - Marine Heavy Helicopter Squadron 466 (CH-53E)
  - Marine Heavy Helicopter Squadron 466 (CH-53E)
  - Marine Heavy Helicopter Squadron 463 (CH-53D)
  - Marine Heavy Helicopter Squadron 464 (CH-53E)
  - Marine Medium Tiltrotor Squadron 261 (MV-22 Osprey)
  - Marine Unmanned Aerial Vehicle Squadron 3 (RQ-7 Shadow/ScanEagle)
  - Marine Aerial Refueler Transport Squadron 352 (KC-130)
  - Marine Air Control Squadron 4 Detachment Bravo (MCAS Iwakuni, JP)

82ND COMBAT AVIATION BRIGADE (Task Force Pegasus) (US Army)

- 1st Battalion, 82nd Aviation Regiment (AH-64)
- 2nd Battalion, 82nd Aviation Regiment (UH-60L)
- 3rd Battalion, 82nd Aviation Regiment (UH-60L, CH-47D/F)

11TH INFANTRY BRIGADE (Task Force Helmand) (UK)

- 1st Battalion, Coldstream Guards (UK)
- 1st Battalion, Grenadier Guards (UK)
- 1st Battalion, Royal Welsh Regiment (UK)
- Elements of 2nd Battalion, Yorkshire Regiment (Operational Mentor and Liaison Team) (UK)
- Elements of 3rd Battalion, Princess Patricia's Canadian Light Infantry (OMLT) (Canada)
- A Sqn, Household Cavalry Regiment
- Tiger Team Afghan SF (reconnaissance force) (UK) (AF)

3RD BRIGADE, 205TH CORPS (Afghan National Army)

- Headquarters, 3d Brigade, 205th Corps (Afghan)
- 1st Kandak (Battalion), 3rd Brigade, 205th Corps (Afghan)
- 2nd Kandak (Battalion), 3rd Brigade, 205th Corps (Afghan)
- 3rd Kandak (Battalion), 3rd Brigade, 205th Corps (Afghan)

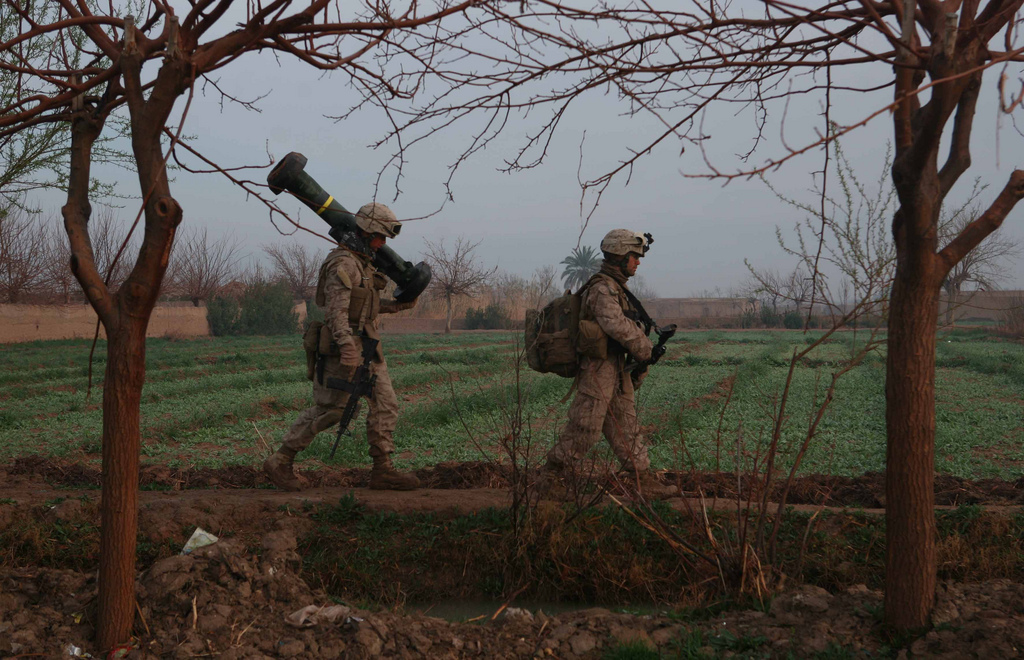
U.S. Marines with Bravo Company, 1st Battalion, 6th Marine Regiment patrol the fields in Aftermath.

OTHER SUPPORTING UNITS

- Combat Logistics Battalion 6 CLR2
- 451st Air Expeditionary Wing (US)
- 904 Expeditionary Air Wing (UK)
- Canadian Helicopter Force – Afghanistan
  - 408 Tactical Helicopter Squadron (Canada)
- Helmand Provincial Reconstruction Team (UK)
- Estonian Company-9 (Estonia)
- Elements of Danish Contingency-ISAF (Denmark)
- 402nd Brigade Support Battalion (US Army)
- 7th Engineer (US Army)
- 502nd Multi Role Bridge Company (US Army)
- 348th Transportation Company (US Army)
- Operational Mentor and Liaison Team (France) with the Afghan Kandak 31
- Task Force Kandahar (Canada)
- Force Element Charlie (Australia)
- Task Force RAIDER (USMC/UK/AFG)
- UKSF: SAS, SBS and Special Forces Support Group
- Joint Task Force Afghanistan (Canada)
- Special Operations Task Force South (SOTF-South)
- Operational Detachment Alpha-1231, 1st Special Forces Group (US Army)
- 1st Kandak (Battalion), 3rd Brigade, 201st Corps (Afghan)
- 3rd Commando Kandak (Afghan)
- 4th Battalion-23rd Infantry Regiment, 5th Stryker Brigade Combat Team, 2nd Infantry Division (US Army)

== Follow On Units (April to December 2010) ==
In March 2010, when the major clearing operations were over, the 2nd Marine Expeditionary Brigade turned over the Helmand Province to the much larger I Marine Expeditionary Force (FWD). By the summer, most of the initial assault units of 2nd MEB were replaced by the units of I MEF (FWD). The official end to Operation MOSHTARAK was December 2010, though units stayed in the city for the years after.

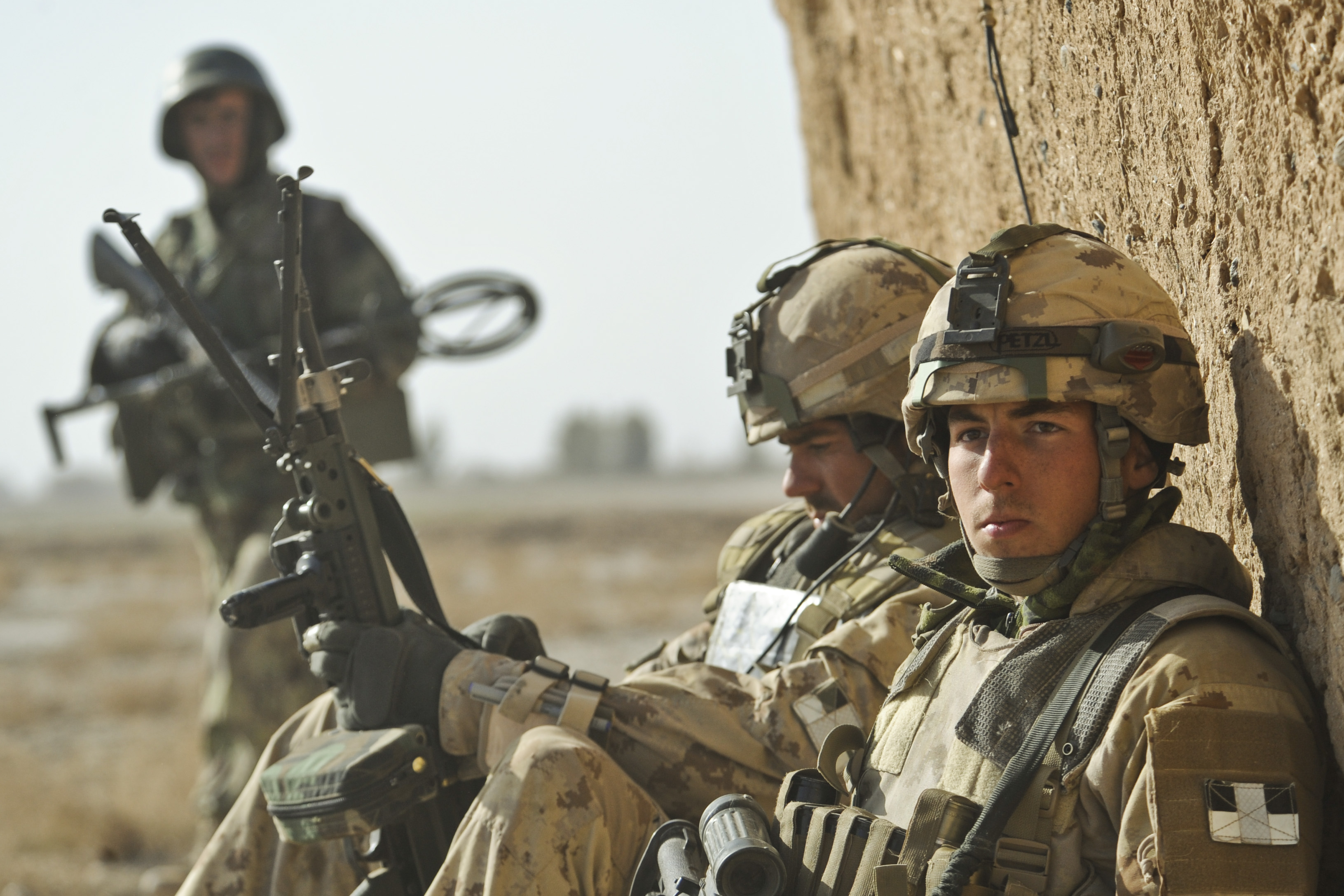
Canadian and Afghan National Army soldiers patrol in Badula Qulp, Helmand province, February 17, 2010

I MARINE EXPEDITIONARY FORCE (FWD)

- 1st Marine Division (FWD)
  - Regimental Combat Team 1 (USMC) (Replaced Regimental Combat Team 7 at Camp Dwyer)
    - 2nd Battalion, 6th Marines (USMC) (Replaced 1/6 in south Marjah, based out of FOB Marjah)
    - 2nd Battalion, 9th Marines (USMC) (Replaced 3/6 in North Marjah, based out of FOB Hansen)
    - Company B, 3rd Assault Amphibian Battalion (USMC)
    - Company E, 2nd Battalion, 4th Marines (USMC)
    - Company A, 1st Tank Battalion attached to Company A, 3rd Combat Engineer Battalion (USMC)
- 1st Marine Logistics Group (MLG) (FWD)
  - 9th Engineer Support Battalion (USMC)

Company F 2nd Battalion 3rd Marines (Attached to 3rd Battalion 9th Marines) P.B Chosin

== Awards and honors ==
Navy Presidential Unit Citation, awarded to the 2nd Marine Expeditionary Brigade for its operations in the Helmand Province in 2009–2010, to include Operation MOSHTARAK.

=== Presidential Unit Citation ===
For the actions of the 2nd Marine Expeditionary Brigade, primarily Operations MOSHTARAK AND KANJAR, Secretary of the Navy Ray Mabus awarded the Presidential Unit Citation, a unit award equivalent to the personal Navy Cross. This is the first Marine-led unit to receive the citation since the I Marine Expeditionary Force was awarded it for its actions in the 2003 assault into Iraq.

Marine Corporal Kyle Carpenter was awarded the Medal of Honor on June 19, 2014, for his actions in Marjah.

=== Medal of Honor ===
Lance Corporal Kyle Carpenter, of 2nd Battalion, 9th Marine Regiment, deployed to Marjah in support of Operation Enduring Freedom. On November 21, 2010, while joining his team to fight off a Taliban attack in a small village the Marines had nicknamed Shadier between two villages nicknamed Shady and Shadiest,^{[8]} He suffered severe injuries to his face and right arm from the blast of an enemy hand grenade; after-action reports state that he threw himself in front of the grenade to protect a fellow Marine. On June 19, 2014, Corporal Carpenter received the Medal of Honor at a ceremony in the White House in Washington, D.C.

=== Navy Cross and Army Distinguished Service Cross ===
- US Army Staff Sergeant Cory Calkins (Army DSC, for action in February 2010)
- US Marine Lance Corporal Joshua Moore (Navy Cross, for actions in March 2011)*

=== Silver Star and British Military Cross ===
- British Able Seaman Kate Nesbitt (Military Cross, for actions in March 2009)*
- US Marine Lance Corporal Edward Huth (Silver Star, for actions in July 2010, upgraded from Bronze Star in 2017)
- US Marine Sergeant Miguelange G. Madrigal (Silver Star, for actions in February 2010)
- US Marine Captain Timothy Sparks (Silver Star, for actions in February 2010)
- US Marine Lance Corporal Jeffrey Cole (Silver Star, for actions in August 2010)
- US Marine Corporal Jason M. Hassinger (Silver Star, for actions in March 2011)*

Medal of Military Valour (Canada) Corporal Bradley Casey, Medical Technician Awarded for actions under fire while providing critical medical care to a wounded Afghan soldier on February 18, 2010.

Mentioned in despatches Sgt Patrick Ferrell and Cpl Neil Dancer of 3 PPCLI *Actions in Marjah, but outside of Operation MOSHTARAK date range

In 2011, then US Army Captain Mathew L. Golsteyn was awarded a Silver Star, for actions in February 2010; however, the award was revoked in 2015, after an investigation into an undisclosed rules-of-engagement violation by Golsteyn in 2010.

== In popular culture ==
=== Films ===
- The 2017 film War Machine, starring Brad Pitt, portrays a fictionalized version of the events surrounding the Battle of Marjah.

=== Documentaries ===
- The Battle for Marjah was a documentary aired on HBO following 1st Battalion, 6th Marines in the initial assault, by Ben Anderson

=== Books ===
- The Wrong War: Grit, Strategy, and the Way Out of Afghanistan by Bing West dedicates several chapters to the assault on Marjah, based on West's experiences while embedded with TF 3/4/205 with a focus on ODA 3121
- Little America: The War within the War for Afghanistan by Rajiv Chandrasekaran. Rajiv was embedded with 2nd Marine Expeditionary Brigade during the troop surge and Operation Moshtarak
- Stand Fast in Marjah: A Second Tour in the Afghan Surge (2026), by Daniel Puckett, is a firsthand memoir recounting the author's experiences as a Marine infantry fire team leader with 1st Battalion, 6th Marines during the 2010 campaign in Marjah, Afghanistan.

=== Social media ===
- The Battle of Marjah Veterans Facebook page is a community of almost 3,000 Marjah veterans and family.
- A Reuters photograph, by Goran Tomasevic, featuring Marines from Bravo Company, 1st Battalion, 6th Marines, Lance Corporal Chris Sanderson and Sergeant Travis Dawson protecting an Afghan man and his child after Taliban fighters opened fire went viral across social media, often being featured as a meme discussing the difference between the Taliban and coalition troops.

== See also ==
- Afghan Peace Jirga 2010
- Operation Achilles
- Operation Panther's Claw
- Psychological warfare
- The Battle for Marjah
