= 10th Marine Regiment =

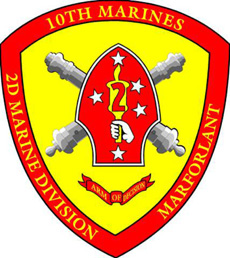
- 10th Marine Regiment Insignia
- Active: 25 April 1914 – present
- Country: United States of America
- Branch: United States Marine Corps
- Type: Artillery Regiment
- Role: Provide fires in support of 2nd Marine Division
- Part of: 2nd Marine Division; II Marine Expeditionary Force
- Garrison/HQ: Marine Corps Base Camp Lejeune
- Nickname: Arm of Decision
- Motto: King of Battle
- Engagements: World War II: Battle of Guadalcanal; Battle of Tarawa; Battle of Saipan; Battle of Tinian; Battle of Okinawa; Operation Desert Storm; War on terror: Operation Iraqi Freedom

Commanders
- Current commander: Col William R. Soucie
- Notable commanders: Thomas E. Bourke; Donald M. Weller; Bertram A. Bone; Robert B. Luckey; Carl A. Youngdale; Herman Poggemeyer Jr.

The 10th Marine Regiment is an artillery regiment of the United States Marine Corps based at Marine Corps Base Camp Lejeune, North Carolina. They fall under the command of the 2nd Marine Division and the II Marine Expeditionary Force.

== Subordinate units ==
- Headquarters Battery, 10th Marines
- Fire Support Battalion, 10th Marines (activated on 21 November 2025)
- 1st Battalion, 10th Marines (1/10)
- 2nd Battalion, 10th Marines (2/10)
- 3rd Battalion, 10th Marines (3/10) inactivated on 26 April 2013
- 4th Battalion, 10th Marines (4/10) inactivated
- 5th Battalion, 10th Marines (5/10) inactivated on 1 June 2012

== Mission ==
Provide fire support to the 2nd Marine Division using organic indirect fire assets while coordinating both lethal and non-lethal fires from other II Marine Expeditionary Force fire support agencies in order to suppress, neutralize or destroy the enemy.

== History ==
=== Early years ===
10th Marines was originally formed in Quantico, Virginia on 25 April 1914 as an artillery battalion under the 1st Marine Brigade. As a battalion, the unit took part in conflicts in Haiti and the Dominican Republic from August 1915 to May 1917. The battalion was expanded throughout mid-1917 and finally, on 15 January 1917 the unit was re-designated as the 10th Marine Regiment of Field Artillery.

Between World War I and II, the Regiment filled many different roles, including building their Barracks and various other construction around the base, and guarding the mail. It even participated in annual reenactments of Civil War battles. During this same time, the regiment was deployed to China and to Iceland just prior to American involvement in World War II.

=== World War II ===
During the War the Regiment was involved in the assault on Guadalcanal and later took part in the bloody battles of Tarawa, Saipan, Tinian and Okinawa.

=== After World War II ===
After the end of World War II, the 10th Marines found themselves at Camp Lejeune, North Carolina, which would be their home until present day. As the Korean War started, the 10th Marines were working with a skeleton crew, but five months later they were fully mobilized and back up to wartime strength and ready to fight. Again, during the Cuban Missile Crisis, they were mobilized to participate in the blockade of Cuba.

=== Modern-Day Activities ===
Since the end of the Korean War, that time the Regiment has participated in exercises testing the methods of firing 155mm howitzers from landing craft, as well as the biannual Fire Exercise at Fort Bragg, North Carolina. The Regiment has also continuously sent firing batteries and battalions to train in Okinawa; and to participate in CAX, a desert training operation held at Twenty-Nine Palms, California on the edge of the Mojave Desert; and to northern Norway in support of NATO training exercises.

=== First Gulf War ===
In January 1990, the Regiment deployed to Saudi Arabia in support of Operation Desert Shield. The Regiment was tasked with providing fire support for the 2nd Marine Division in the war to oust Iraqi forces from occupied Kuwait.

=== Global war on terrorism ===
10th Marines deployed to Kuwait in early 2003 and provided fire support for Task Force Tarawa during the 2003 Invasion of Iraq. Since 2003, the Regiment has continued to deploy battalion headquarters units and their subordinate batteries to Iraq to provide fire support and sometimes also act as provisional rifle companies especially in the Al Anbar province of western part of the country. Units of the regiment also continued to deploy to Afghanistan in support of Operation Enduring Freedom.

== Unit Awards ==
- Presidential Unit Citation with 1 Bronze Star
- Navy Unit Commendation
- Asiatic Pacific Campaign Medal with 4 Bronze Stars
- World War II Victory Medal
- World War II Navy of Occupation Medal

== See also ==
- List of United States Marine Corps regiments
- Organization of the United States Marine Corps
