= Lawrence D. Nicholson =

United States Marine Corps general

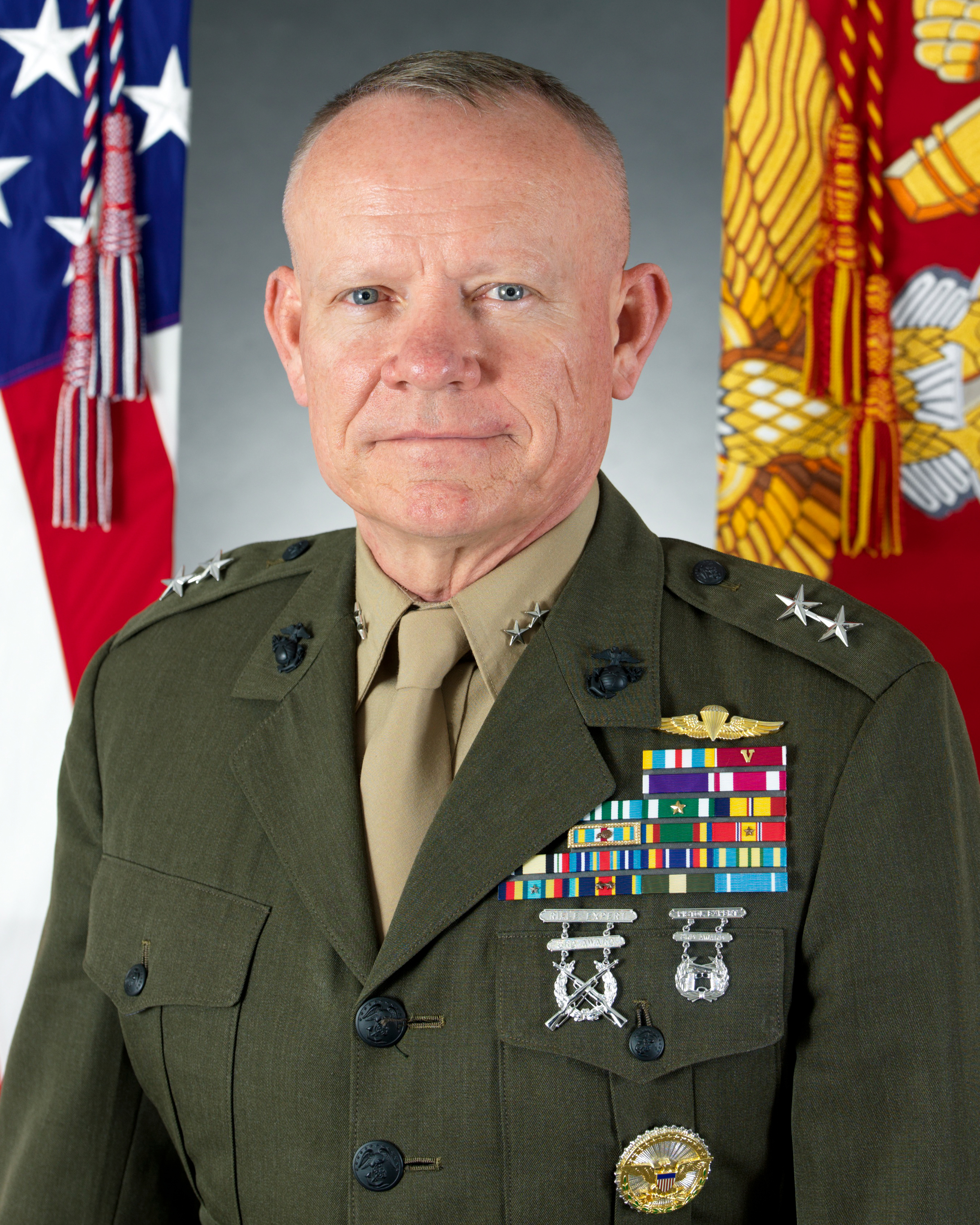
- Official portrait 2013
- Born: June 29, 1956 (age 70); Toronto, Ontario, Canada
- Military career
- Allegiance: United States
- Branch: United States Marine Corps
- Service years: 1979–2018
- Rank: Lieutenant General
- Commands: III Marine Expeditionary Force; 1st Marine Division; 1st Marine Expeditionary Brigade; 5th Marine Regiment; Task Force Leatherneck
- Conflicts: Iraq War; War in Afghanistan
- Awards: Defense Distinguished Service Medal; Defense Superior Service Medal; Legion of Merit; Purple Heart; Meritorious Service Medal

Lawrence D. Nicholson (born June 29, 1956) is a retired United States Marine Corps Lieutenant General. He attended Augusta Military Academy in Ft. Defiance, VA. He served as Commanding General III Marine Expeditionary Force from 2015 to 2018, having previously commanded the 1st Marine Division from 2012 to 2015.

== Marine Corps career ==
He was commissioned via the Naval ROTC program at The Citadel in 1979, where he earned a bachelor's degree in English. His initial assignment was as a Platoon Leader with 3rd Battalion, 1st Marines under the 1st Marine Division at Camp Pendleton, California. He served as Series Commander and Company Commander at Marine Corps Recruit Depot San Diego from 1982 to 1985. He has extensive experience in Iraq having led Regimental Combat Team 1 during Operation Phantom Fury, where he was wounded in action; served as a staff officer with the 1st Marine Division in Ramadi and commanded the 5th Marine Regiment in Fallujah.

In Afghanistan he commanded Task Force Leatherneck and the 2d Marine Expeditionary Brigade in Helmand Province along with serving as Deputy Commander for Operations of the International Security Assistance Force. Prior to assuming command of 1st MARDIV he was Senior Military Assistant to the Deputy Secretary of Defense.
General Nicholson earned a master's degree from the United States Army Command and General Staff College; he retired and passed command of III Marine Expeditionary Force to Lt. Gen. Eric M. Smith, who is also a former 1st Marine Division commander, on August 2, 2018. Nicholson is an Advisory Board Member of Spirit of America, a 501(c)(3) organization.
