= Jerry Golsteyn =

American football player (born 1954)

No. 12, 17, 11
- Position: Quarterback

Personal information
- Born: August 6, 1954 (age 72); West Allis, Wisconsin, U.S.
- Listed height: 6 ft 4 in (1.93 m)
- Listed weight: 207 lb (94 kg)

Career information
- High school: West Allis Central
- College: Northern Illinois
- NFL draft: 1976: 12th round, 333rd overall pick

Career history
- New York Giants (1976–1978); Baltimore Colts (1979); Detroit Lions (1979); Orlando Americans (1981); Tampa Bay Buccaneers (1982–1983); Los Angeles Raiders (1984); Orlando Renegades (1985)

Career NFL statistics
- Passing attempts: 217
- Passing completions: 92
- Completion percentage: 42.4%
- TD–INT: 2–13
- Passing yards: 1,077
- Passer rating: 36.2
- Stats at Pro Football Reference

Jerry Mark Golsteyn (born August 6, 1954) is an American former professional football player. Golsteyn played college football as quarterback at Northern Illinois University and was selected by the New York Giants in the 12th round of the 1976 NFL draft. He played in eight National Football League (NFL) seasons, from 1977 to 1984 for five different teams, the Giants, the Baltimore Colts, the Detroit Lions, the Tampa Bay Buccaneers, and the Los Angeles Raiders. Golsteyn also played a brief stint for the Orlando Americans in the American Football Association in 1981, becoming one of the few NFL-caliber players to play in that league. The fact that Golsteyn was a star in the league was occasionally used as a joke regarding the AFA's inability to sign marquee talent. He then played for the Orlando Renegades of the United States Football League (USFL) in 1985.

== Personal life ==
Golsteyn is the father of U.S. Army Special Forces officer Mathew Golsteyn, who was charged and later pardoned of murder of an Afghan civilian detainee in Marjah, Afghanistan.
