= Mathew L. Golsteyn =

United States Army officer

Mathew Golsteyn
- Military career
- Allegiance: United States of America
- Branch: United States Army
- Service years: 2002–2015
- Rank: Major
- Awards: Silver Star (revoked in 2015); National Defense Service Medal; Afghanistan Campaign Medal; Army Service Ribbon; NATO Medal for ISAF; Special Forces Tab (revoked in 2014)

Major Mathew L. Golsteyn is a United States Army officer who served in the War in Afghanistan. He was charged with murder after the summary killing of an Afghan civilian detainee in Marjah, who he claims was a bomb maker for the Taliban. Golsteyn's case came to prominence after U.S. President Donald Trump said that he would review Maj. Golsteyn's case. Golsteyn received a presidential pardon on 15 November 2019.

== Early life ==
Golsteyn grew up in Central Florida, where he attended Trinity Preparatory School; as a student he was quarterback of the football team, which was coached by his father, former NFL player Jerry Golsteyn.

== Military career ==
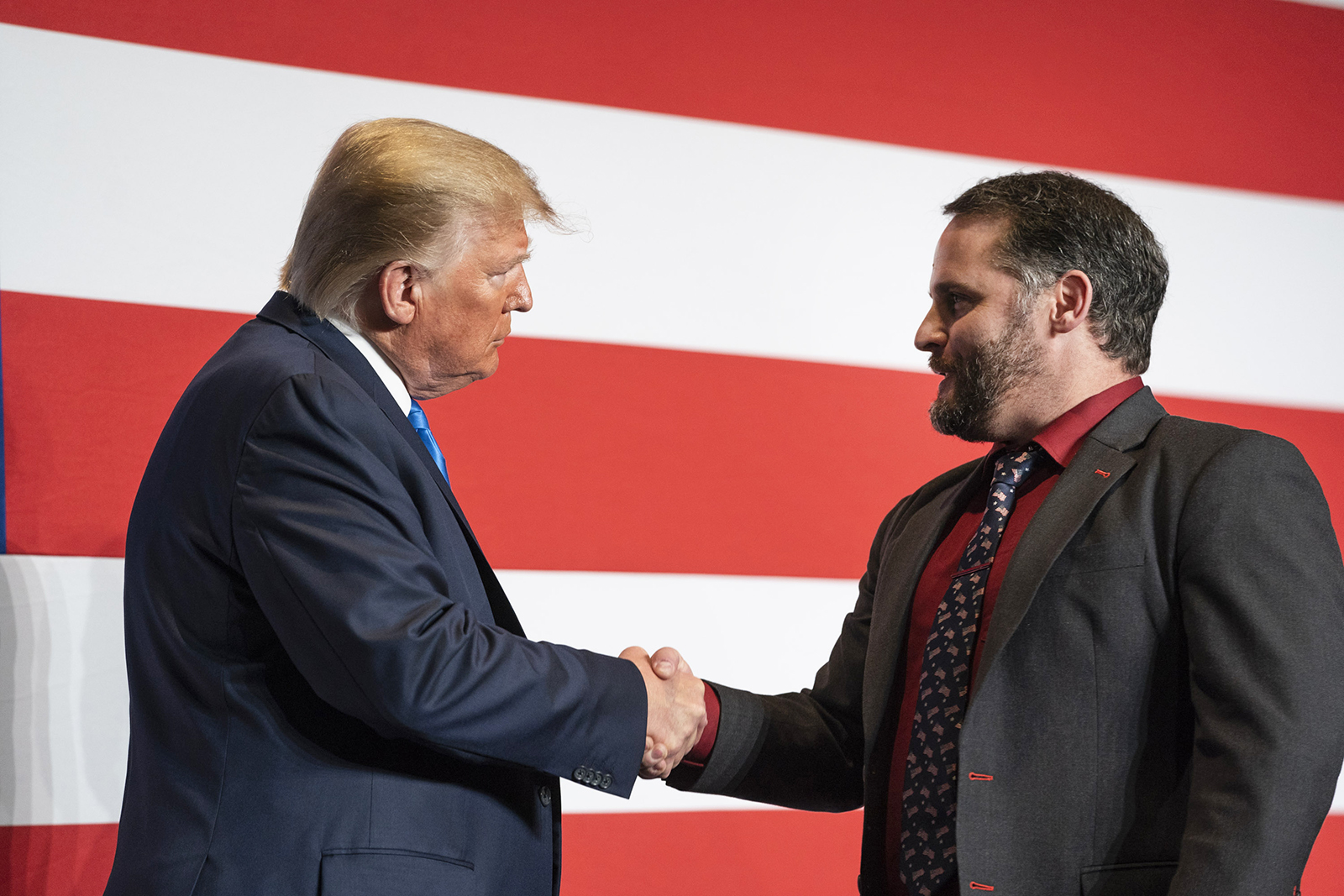
Golsteyn greeting President Donald Trump in December 2019

Golsteyn graduated from the United States Military Academy in 2002. He was commissioned into the army as a second lieutenant and later attended Special Forces Selection. He served in the 3rd Special Forces Group. In 2011, then Captain Golsteyn was awarded a Silver Star, for actions in February 2010. In 2013 the Army reopened an investigation into Golsteyn resulting in the award being revoked in 2015 for a violation of rules of engagement for an incident dating back to 2010.

=== Killing of alleged Afghan bomb-maker ===
In 2010 Golsteyn was part of Operation Moshtarak, a campaign to occupy the town of Marjah, Helmand Province, from the Taliban. In February, a bomb killed two Marines who had been working under Golsteyn's command. Golsteyn and his team searched the nearby village for the bomb-maker, who they believed was a local named Rasoul. A tribal leader alleged that Rasoul was a member of the Taliban. According to the Army, once Rasoul was detained, the leader did not want him released and feared that if he was released, he would kill more people, to include U.S. Servicemembers. Golsteyn allegedly admitted to the killing as part of a lie detector test taken during a CIA job interview in 2011. It was also allegedly reported that in the interview with the CIA, Golsteyn claimed that another soldier had later taken the alleged bomb-maker off base, and then shot and killed him, and Golsteyn later helped burn the body. After this revelation, the Army investigated the case, but closed it with no charges in 2013. The Army instead dealt with the matter administratively, and issued Golsteyn a memorandum of reprimand and revoked both his original Silver Star and the Distinguished Service Cross that had not yet been presented. The medal revocation was justified by the Secretary of the Army on the grounds that "facts subsequently determined" would have prevented the original award, which was permissible by both Army and DoD regulations. In June 2015, Golsteyn was referred to a board of inquiry to "show cause" for retention on active duty. The board found that he engaged in "conduct unbecoming an officer," and committed "misconduct, moral, or professional derelection" and recommended his elimination from the armed forces under a general characterization of service. In April 2016, the board reconvened to clarify that Golsteyn "failed in his duties to own all the circumstances of the incident in its entirety," specifying that "he shot an Afghan . . . and then took steps to cover it up," "omitted key facts in his reporting," "failed to report all the facts officially and for the record over an extended period of time," and "failed those he led by engaging in activities during the incident that sought to cover up the circumstance in question."

In November 2016, Golsteyn was a guest on a Fox News show. Asked by host Bret Baier if he had killed a suspected bomb-maker, Golsteyn responded "yes". Golsteyn's admission led to the Army reopening the case.

=== Presidential pardon ===
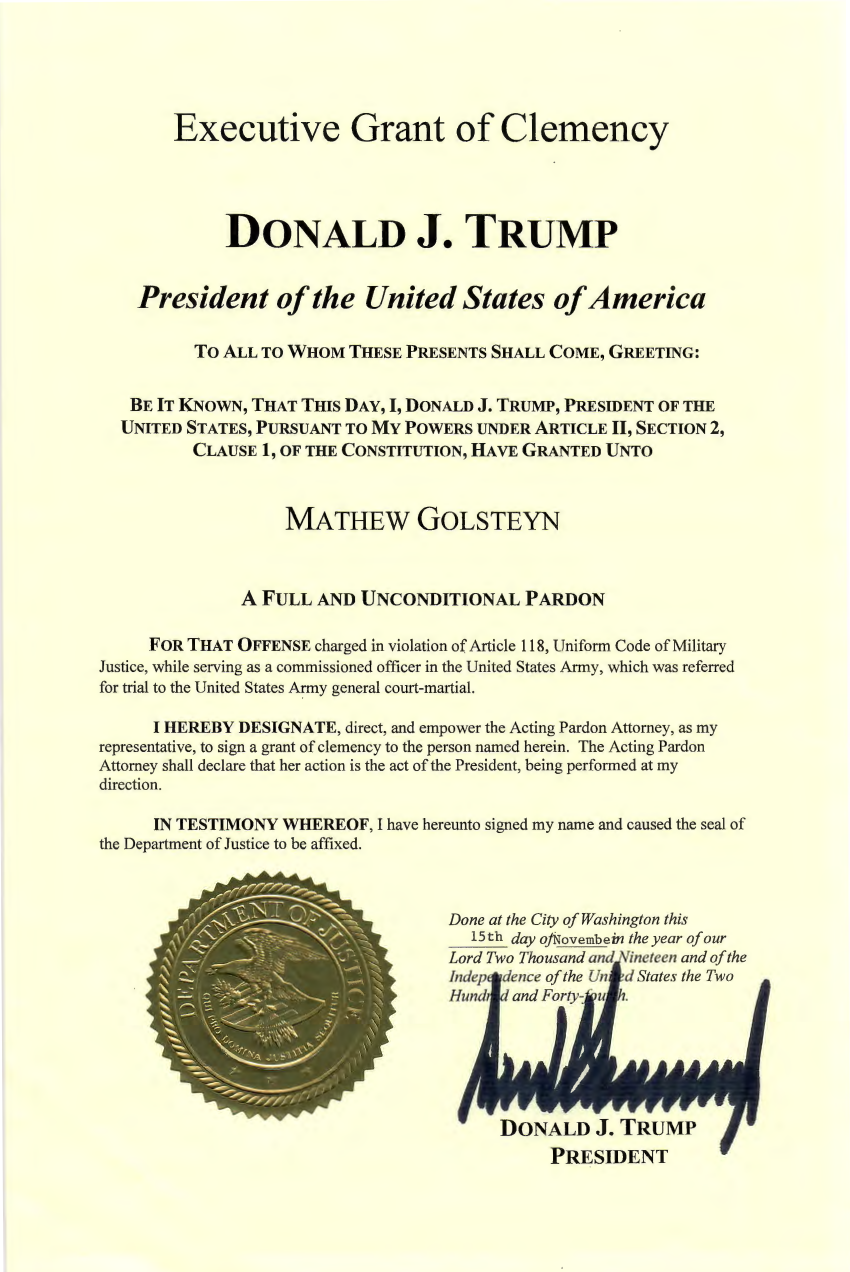
Official pardon of Golsteyn on November 15, 2019

Golsteyn made national news when U.S. President Donald Trump announced that he would review Golsteyn's case.

On November 15, 2019, President Donald Trump signed a pardon for Golsteyn; it resulted in the dropping of all charges.

The following month, Lieutenant General Francis Beaudette, the commander of U.S. Army Special Operations Command, denied a request by Golsteyn to have his Special Forces Tab reinstated. The service then convened an administrative panel, the Board for Correction of Military Records, to determine whether it should reinstate the Special Forces Tab and a Distinguished Service Cross, and expunge a letter of reprimand Golsteyn received. The Board ruled against Golsteyn in all requested actions. On Golsteyn's medal revocation, it noted that "The Department of Defense has directed that awards such as the DSC and [Silver Star] should be revoked if subsequently determined facts would have prevented the original approval or presentation of the award," and also noted that this appeared in Army Regulations. The Board determined relief was not warranted because Golsteyn's pardon was "a sign of forgiveness" and "does not indicate innocence." Similarly, the Board noted that Golsteyn's Special Forces Tab was revoked pursuant to Army regulations, as the USASOC Commander determined that his actions were "inconsistent with the integrity, professionalism, and conduct of a Special Forces Soldier." They found that the revocation was not impacted by Golsteyn's pardon, noting that the Department of Justice advised Golsteyn that the pardon "does not equate to a finding of innocence." They found that the CID investigation contained ample evidence of "an unjustified killing" as well as "conspir[ing] . . . . to hide and destroy evidence of his misconduct," which was admitted both "to the CIA and to the media." The Board also noted that Golsteyn had been administratively eliminated (fired) from the Army as a result. Finally, the Board declined to remove the reprimand from Golsteyn's personnel file, ruling that the reprimand "addresses and condemns behavior beyond conduct proscribed by [Golsteyn's UCMJ charges]," and the reprimand was not "in any way untrue or unjust." Further, it noted that the Department of Justice advised Golsteyn that the pardon would not expunge all records relating to the offense.

== See also ==
- List of people pardoned or granted clemency by the president of the United States
- Clint Lorance, former US Army first lieutenant convicted of second-degree murder for two 2012 battlefield killings in Afghanistan; sentenced to 20 years imprisonment; incarcerated at Fort Leavenworth; pardoned and released after six years.
