= 5th Battalion, 10th Marines =

5th Battalion 10th Marines
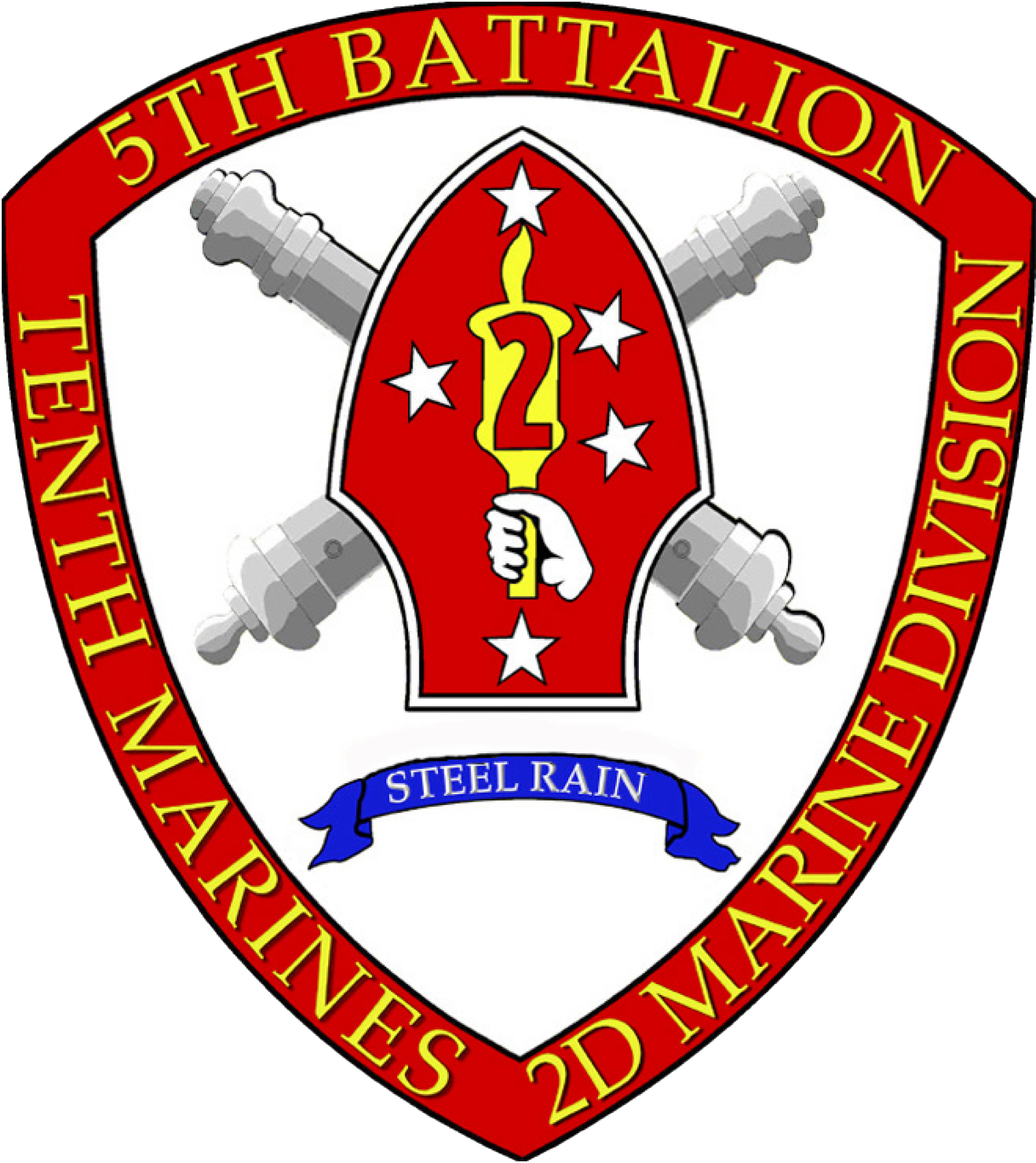
- 5/10 Insignia
- Active: 10 February 1942 – 18 November 1947; 1954 – 1 June 2012
- Country: United States
- Branch: United States Marine Corps
- Type: Artillery
- Role: Provides fire support for the 2nd Marine Division
- Part of: 10th Marine Regiment; 2nd Marine Division
- Garrison/HQ: Marine Corps Base Camp Lejeune
- Nicknames: Five and Dime
- Motto: "Steel Rain"
- Engagements: World War II: Battle of Guadalcanal; Battle of Tarawa; Battle of Saipan; Battle of Guam; Battle of Iwo Jima; Operation Desert Storm; Operation Iraqi Freedom; Operation Enduring Freedom

Commanders
- Current commander: Lt Col Walker M. Field

5th Battalion, 10th Marine Regiment (5/10) was a USMC artillery battalion comprising three firing batteries and a headquarters battery. The battalion was stationed at Marine Corps Base Camp Lejeune, North Carolina, and its primary weapon system was the M777A2 howitzer, with a maximum effective range of 30 km. They fell under the command of the 10th Marine Regiment and the 2nd Marine Division. The battalion was known by its nickname of, "The Five and Dime."

== Mission ==
Provide direct support to 2nd Marine Division in time of conflict. That support may come in the traditional fashion of artillery fires to maneuver forces, or by providing batteries to serve as provisional rifle companies. The battalion also has the secondary mission of providing civil affairs. The battalion has currently returned from a year deployment to Helmand Province, Afghanistan in support of Operation Enduring Freedom. The battalion served as the 2D Marine Expeditionary Brigade Headquarters Group.

== Current units ==
- Headquarters Battery
- O Battery
- R Battery
- S Battery
- T Battery
- G Battery 2/12 (Golf Battery is originally a UDP unit out of Camp Hansen, Okinawa.)
- I Battery 3/12 (India Battery 3/12 is originally a unit out of the 3rd Marine Division; a former battery that was part of 5/10 and was disbanded in April 2007 and was re-activated in Camp Pendleton that same year.)

== History ==
Originally activated as 3rd Battalion, 10th Marines on 1 January 1941 and armed with 75mm Pack Howitzers; the battalion now known as "the Steel Rain Battalion" fired the opening artillery rounds of the first U.S. offensive of World War II on 7 August 1942 against a Japanese sniper position on Guadalcanal.

After earning two Presidential Unit Citations for service on Guadalcanal and Tarawa, the battalion briefly switched designations to 5th Battalion, 10th Marines. Six weeks later, the battalion transitioned to 155mm howitzers and was renamed the 2D 155mm Howitzer Battalion, a designation carried through the campaign for Saipan where they fired over 10,000 rounds, Guam where their displacements outpaced even the more nimble 75mm guns, and Iwo Jima where the battalion landed on D+1. The battalion was deactivated in 1945, and its guns remained silent until 1954 when it was re-activated.

With the exception of the Cuban Missile Crisis in October 1962, where Marines supported the blockade that forced the Soviet Union to remove its missiles from Cuba, the Steel Rain Battalion did not see action again until the Gulf War. The battalion was re-designated 5th Battalion, 10th Marines, 2d Marine Division in 1978 and served as the division's general support artillery battalion.

During Operation Desert Shield and Desert Storm from December 1990 to April 1991, the Marines of 5/10 manned 8" and 155mm self-propelled howitzers and supported the division during the liberation of Kuwait. Since 1991, 5/10 has distinguished itself during service in Haiti in 1994 and by supporting the ongoing War on Terrorism through service as provisional infantry, civil affairs, training foreign militaries, and providing artillery fire support to the coalition forces in Iraq. Battery R was attached to 5/11 during the invasion of Operation Iraqi Freedom in 2003. The battalion most recently served as the Brigade Headquarters Group for 2d Marine Expeditionary Brigade while deployed to Southern Afghanistan.

The battalion was deployed as a Civil Affairs Group in support of Operation Iraqi Freedom in 2007. The battalion was part of the 2nd Marine Expeditionary Brigade in support of Operation Enduring Freedom that deployed in Spring 2009, and returned in spring of 2010, from the Helmand Province in southern Afghanistan.

The battalion was deactivated on 1 June 2012 at Camp Lejuene, N.C.

== Honors ==
- The Presidential Unit Citation Streamer with One Bronze Star
- The Navy Unit Commendation Streamer with One Bronze Star
- The American Defense Service Streamer
- The Asiatic-Pacific Campaign Streamer with One Silver and One Bronze star
- World War II Victory Streamer
- National Defense Service Streamer with Two Bronze Stars
- The Armed Forces Expeditionary Streamer
- The Southwest Asia Service Streamer with Three Bronze Stars
- The Global War on Terror Service Streamer
- The Global War on Terror Expeditionary Streamer
- Iraqi Campaign Streamer with One Bronze Star
- Afghanistan Campaign Streamer with One Bronze Star

== See also ==
- 2nd Marine Expeditionary Brigade
- List of United States Marine Corps battalions
- Organization of the United States Marine Corps
