= 2nd Assault Amphibian Battalion =

Battalion of the United States Marine Corps

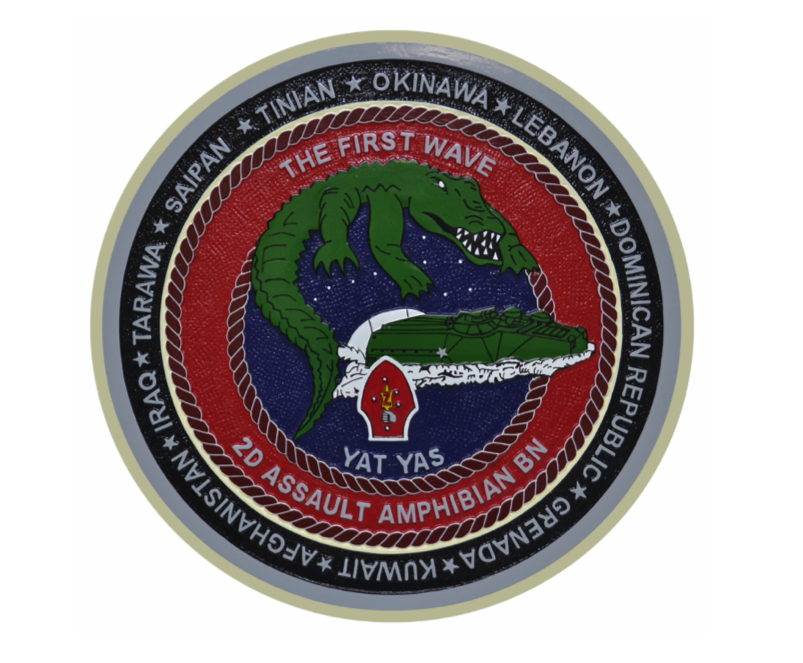
- 2nd AABn's insignia
- Active: March 18, 1942 – November 29, 1949; August 10, 1950 – present
- Country: United States of America
- Branch: United States Marine Corps
- Type: Mechanized battalion
- Role: Amphibious assault
- Size: Battalion
- Part of: 2nd Marine Division; II Marine Expeditionary Force
- Garrison/HQ: Marine Corps Base Camp Lejeune
- Nickname: 2nd Tracks
- Mottos: YAT-YAS "You Ain't Tracks – You Ain't Shit" "The First Wave" "Second to None"; A Mare Ad Terram "From sea to land"
- Colors: Red, White, Blue & Green
- Mascot: Alligator
- Engagements: World War II: Battle of Guadalcanal; Battle of Tarawa; Battle of Saipan; Battle of Tinian; Battle of Okinawa; Operation Desert Storm; War on terror: Operation Iraqi Freedom; Operation Enduring Freedom

Commanders
- Current commander: Lieutenant Colonel Matthew C. Ludlow
- Command Sergeant Major: Sergeant Major Michael A. Manzke

2nd Assault Amphibian Battalion (2nd AABn) is one of two active duty assault amphibian battalions in the United States Marine Corps. The battalion is tasked with transporting US Marine forces and their equipment from assault ships to shore, and equipped with the Amphibious Combat Vehicle (ACV), which replaced the Amphibious Assault Vehicle (AAV). The battalion is part of the 2nd Marine Division and the II Marine Expeditionary Force. The unit is based in Camp Lejeune in North Carolina.

== History ==
=== World War II ===
The Second Amphibian Tractor Battalion was commissioned on March 18, 1942, in San Diego, California. The battalion was an organic unit of the 2nd Marine Division, composed of a Headquarters and Service Company and three letter companies, all equipped with the Landing Vehicle Tracked-1 (LVT-1).

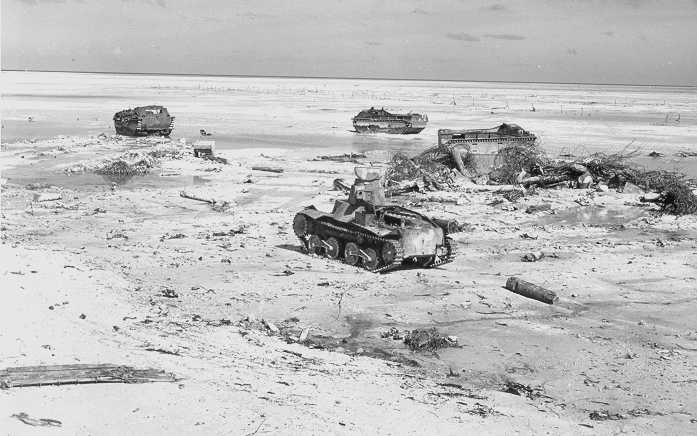
Disabled US LVTs and a Japanese Type 95 light tank on Tarawa litter the beach after the battle.

==== Guadalcanal ====
In November 1942 the battalion was relocated to Wellington, New Zealand where it continued training for follow on amphibious operations. Company H from 2d Tracks arrived at Tulagi on October 9 as part of other reinforcements from the 2nd Marine Division.

==== Tarawa ====
The battalion left New Zealand along with the rest of the 2nd Marine Division on November 1, 1943. While participating in a practice landing against Mele Bay, Efate on November 8, the battalion was also preparing to receive 50 new LVT-2 amphibian tractors. The new LVT-2s were placed into Company A-1 which was stood up with additional personnel from the 1st Amphibian Tractor Battalion, 2d Light Tank Battalion and 2d Special Weapons Battalion. Tarawa marked the first time the LVT-2 Water Buffalo participated in combat operations. The battalion's LVTs took part in the first, second, and third waves of landings at Tarawa on November 20, 1943. The first wave across the beach consisted of 42 LVT-1s each carrying 18 Marines and 45 LVT-2's each with 20 Marines.

The battalion's LVTs provided a continuous supply of ammunition, reinforcements, and ferrying back of the wounded. Of 125 vehicles used (50 new LVT-2s and 75 LVT-1s), only 35 remained operational by the end of the first day, continuing to ferry men and supplies across the coral reef and through the shallows to the beach. The Battle of Tarawa resulted in 32 killed in action and 68 missing Marines for the battalion. Among the dead was the battalion's commanding officer, Major Henry C. Drewes, who was posthumously awarded the Silver Star for his heroic actions under fire before being killed on the first day of the battle. Following the assault on Tarawa the battalion was sent to Hawaii where it established itself at the newly created Camp Henry C. Drewes and began receiving new equipment, men and supplies and also began training for its next combat operation.

==== Saipan & Tinian ====
In May 1944 the decision was made to assign the battalion to the V Amphibious Corps vice the 2nd Marine Division. This was revised in September 1944 when the battalion was again reassigned to Fleet Marine Forces, Pacific. LVT-4s from the 2nd Amphibian Tractor Battalion, again transporting Marines from the 2d Marine Division, came ashore at Saipan, south of Garapan at 0843 on June 15, 1944.

On July 24, 1944, the 2nd Amphibian Tractor Battalion with 96 LVT-2s and 40 LVT-4s, brought the 24th Marine Regiment ashore during the Battle of Tinian.

==== Post-war movement and reorganization ====
After the surrender of Japan in August 1945, the battalion returned to the United States and was decommissioned on November 29, 1945, at Marine Corps Base Camp Pendleton, California.

=== 1990s ===
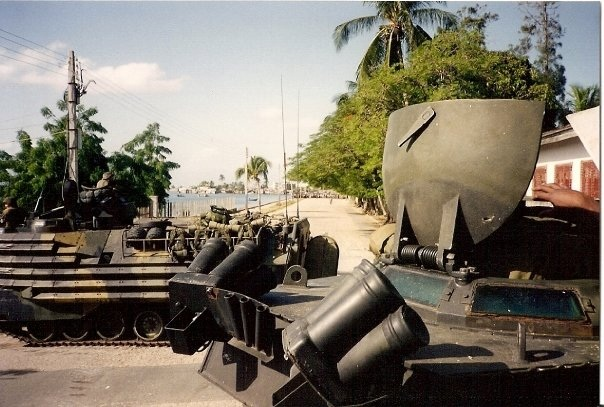
AAV's at the port of Cape Haitian, Haiti 1994.

In August 1994, a platoon from Bravo Company 2nd AABN and Golf Company, 2nd Battalion, 2nd Marines departed for the Caribbean and Haitian waters for Operation Support Democracy. On the morning of September 20, Marines once again landed on the shores of Cap Haitian, Haiti since the first landing by Major Smedley Butler in 1915. Tensions were high and a fire fight ensued between Haitian military police and a Marine patrol. The incident ended with no Marine deaths but Ten Haitian Policeman were killed. Battalion 2/2 and its AAV attachment remained during Operation Uphold Democracy lasting until October 1994.

In April 1996, Golf Company 2/2 and Charlie Company 1st Platoon was attached to the 22nd Marine Expeditionary Unit. The AAV platoon was used as rifleman and as a reactionary force in support of Golf Company during the reinforcement of the American Embassy in Monrovia, Liberia during Operation Assured Response.

=== Global war on terror ===
==== Operation Iraqi Freedom ====
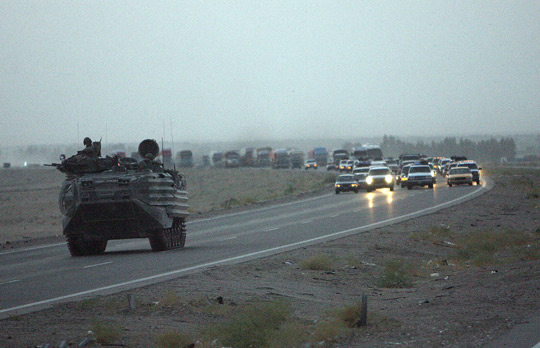
An AAV from 2nd AABn conducts an IED sweep outside of Fallujah in August 2006.

The battalion was deployed to the Middle East in 2003 and took part in Operation Iraqi Freedom I providing mechanized support for the infantry regiments. On March 23, elements of Company A and C fought in the Battle of Nasiriyah with Regimental Combat Team 2.

After the invasion, the battalion began a regular rotation of companies to Iraq. Usually designated "Team Gator", these companies provided both traditional AAV missions and provisional infantry missions.

Company C and D participated in the Operation Phantom Fury (Second Battle of Fallujah) in November 2004 – January 2005.

In 2007, Company A was the last 2d AABn unit to use AAVs for entire deployment relieved by company D. Company D switched, in January 2008, to MRAPs and continued security missions all along Mobile, their usual area of operations (AO), after Operation Phantom Fury.

Company D was the last AAV unit tasked with the Route Mobile mission. Company B relocated to Ramadi upon arrival.

Company B deployed to Ramadi in support of 1st Battalion, 9th Marines. The company was tasked with operating the numerous entry control points (ECPs) around the city.

Company A deployed as MRAP Company and relieved Company B and took over the ECP's in Oct 2008 in Ramadi. They then closed all ECP's down and turned them over to the Iraqi Police in Feb 2009 and returned home.

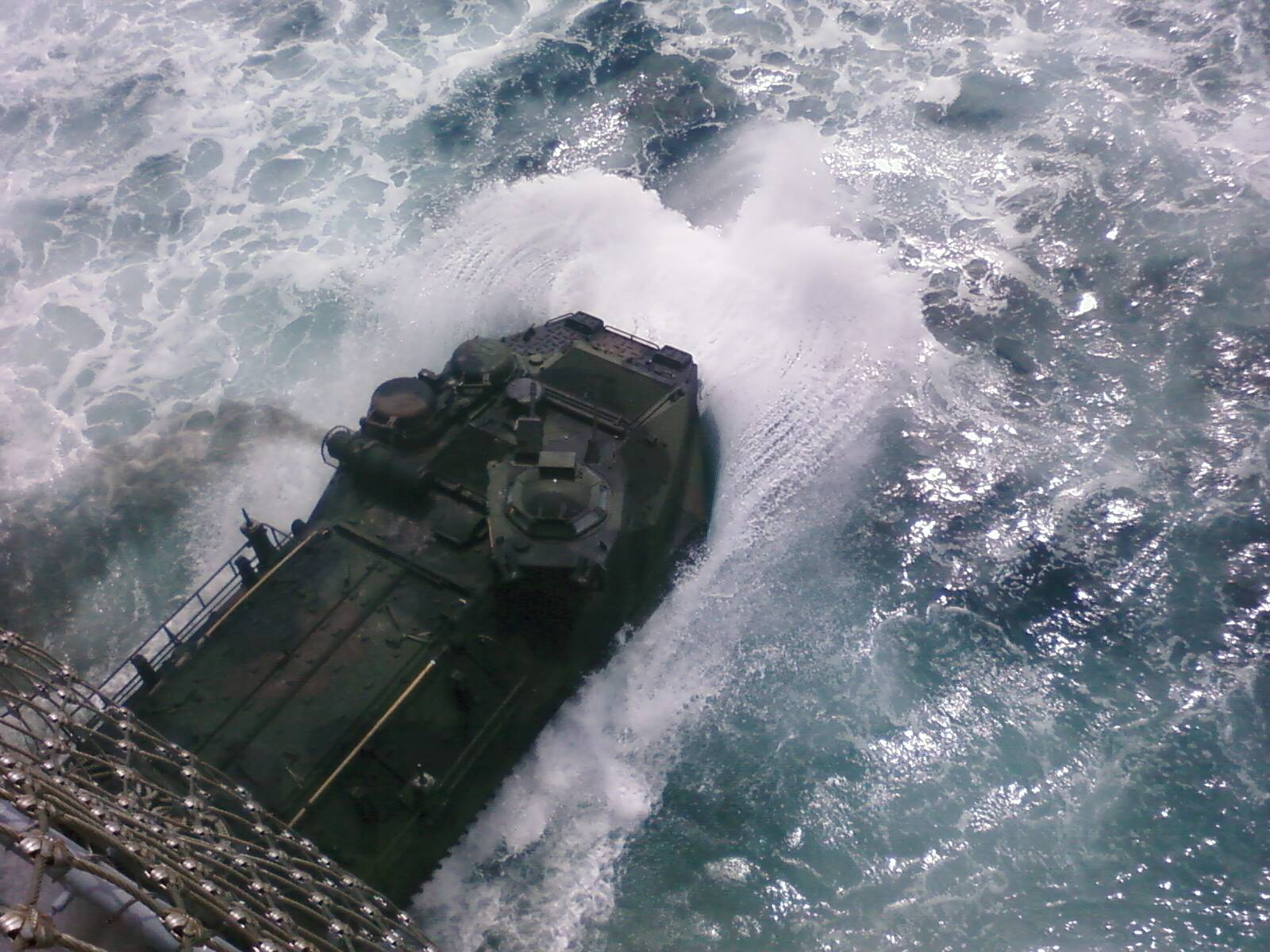
Amphibious Assault Vehicles from 2nd Assault Amphibian Battalion splash off the back of an amphibious assault ship off the coast of Camp Lejeune, NC in 2009.

==== Operation Enduring Freedom ====
Elements of Company C deployed to the Helmand Province with Battalion Landing Team 1/6 as part of the 24th Marine Expeditionary Unit. The platoon was part of combat operations in the Taliban filled district of Garmsir.

Company D deployed to the Helmand Province, Afghanistan as MRAP Company, Regimental Combat Team 3 in 2009. They conducted route security missions, local population engagements, screening missions, and manned two combat outposts while attached to 1st Battalion, 5th Marines.

Company B, Det-A deployed from November 2009 to May 2010 to relieve Company D as MRAP Company for Regimental Combat Team 7. Fourth Platoon was attached to 1st Battalion, 3d Marines and conducted provisional infantry missions from two combat outposts. Third Platoon and the company headquarters element participated in Operation Moshtarak (Battle of Marjeh). After supporting clearing operations with the 3/4/205 Afghan National Army battalion, the platoon provided security at the Marjeh Government Center and for the District Governor.

Company B, Det-B deployed as part of the troop surge in Afghanistan in December 2009. They were designated as the Base Defense Operations Center company and secured the major southern Helmand Province Marine base Camp Dwyer. Second Platoon provided the guard force for the base and manned a nearby outpost. Elements of 1st Platoon also participated in route security and screening missions during the preparations phase of Operation Moshtarak.

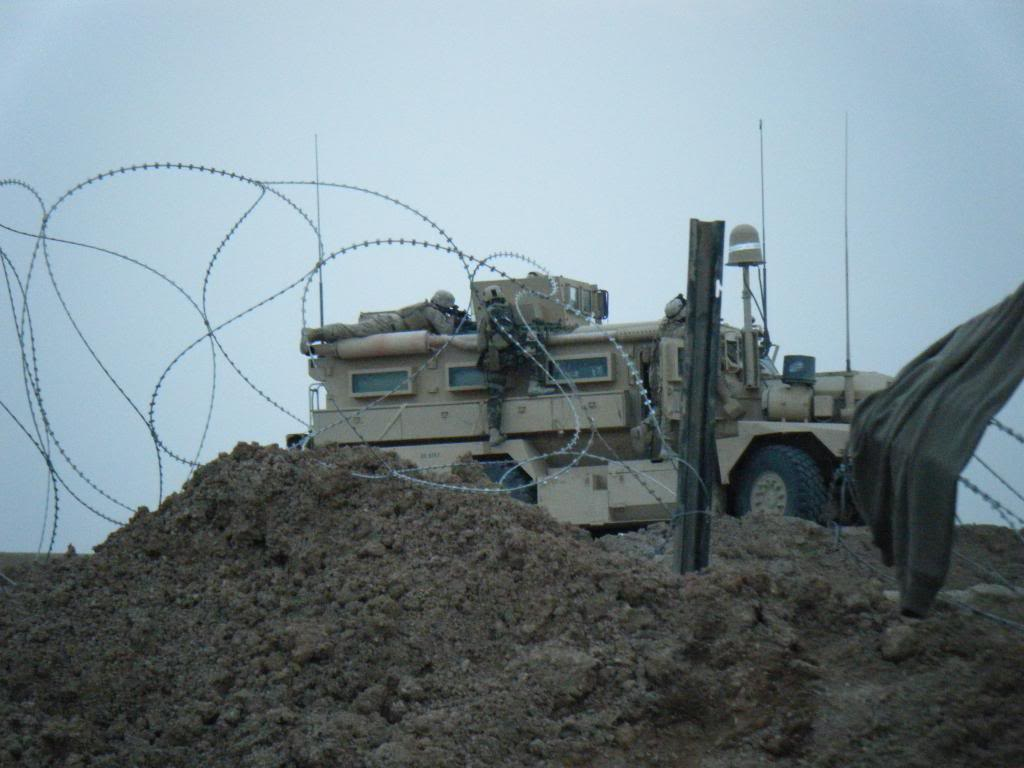
Marines from Bravo Company, 2nd Assault Amphibian Battalion return fire on the Taliban during Operation Moshtarak in Marjeh, Afghanistan 2010.

Operation Unified Response Following the devastating earthquake Haiti in January 2010, platoons of Company A and C (as part of the 22nd and 24th Marine Expeditionary Units) as well as Yankee Platoon from Headquarters and Service Company (part of African Partnership 2010) deployed to the country to provide humanitarian assistance

==== Operation Odyssey Dawn and Operation Unified Protector ====
At the start of Operation Odyssey Dawn, the US-led operation in support of the Libyan civil war, the ground combat element of the 26th MEU was in Afghanistan conducting combat operations. In order to quickly provide sea-based ground troops to support possible ground intervention in Libya, the 22nd Marine Expeditionary Unit deployed in March 2011, four months prior to its originally scheduled deployment. Delta Company, 1st Platoon, deployed as AAV Platoon (aboard USS Whidbey Island LSD-41) as part of Echo Company, Battalion Landing Team 2nd Battalion, 2nd Marines (2/2), the Ground Combat Element for the 22nd MEU. After several months preparing for possible ground combat operations and quick reaction force for Operation Odyssey Dawn, and the subsequent NATO-led Operation Unified Protector, the 22nd MEU and the USS Bataan Amphibious Ready Group spent a total of ten-and-a-half months at sea in the Mediterranean and Middle East conducting bi-lateral training and supporting national contingency planning as a result of the new Arab Spring. Its 321-day duration fell eight days short of the record set in 1973 by the aircraft carrier USS Midway for the longest US Navy deployment since World War II. The 22nd MEU was awarded the Meritorious Unit Commendation and the NATO Non-Article 5 Medal for Operation Unified Protector. While at sea, AAV platoon had a secondary mission as a provisional rifle platoon, to provide an additional trained medium machine gun squad, and as the Evacuation Control Center for any potential non-combatant evacuation operations. Upon return to 2nd Assault Amphibian Battalion, the platoon was re-designated at Charlie Company, 3rd platoon.

=== Notable former members ===
- Justin LeHew – One of the most highly decorated US servicemen serving in the war on terror. Recipient of the Navy Cross for action during the Battle of Nasiriyah in 2003. Recipient of the Bronze Star Medal with combat "V" for heroic actions during the battle of Najaf 2004.
- Luis E. Fonseca Jr. – recipient of the Navy Cross for action during the Battle of Nasiriyah in 2003.

== See also ==
- List of United States Marine Corps battalions
- Organization of the United States Marine Corps
