= 3rd Battalion, 10th Marines =

3rd Battalion 10th Marines
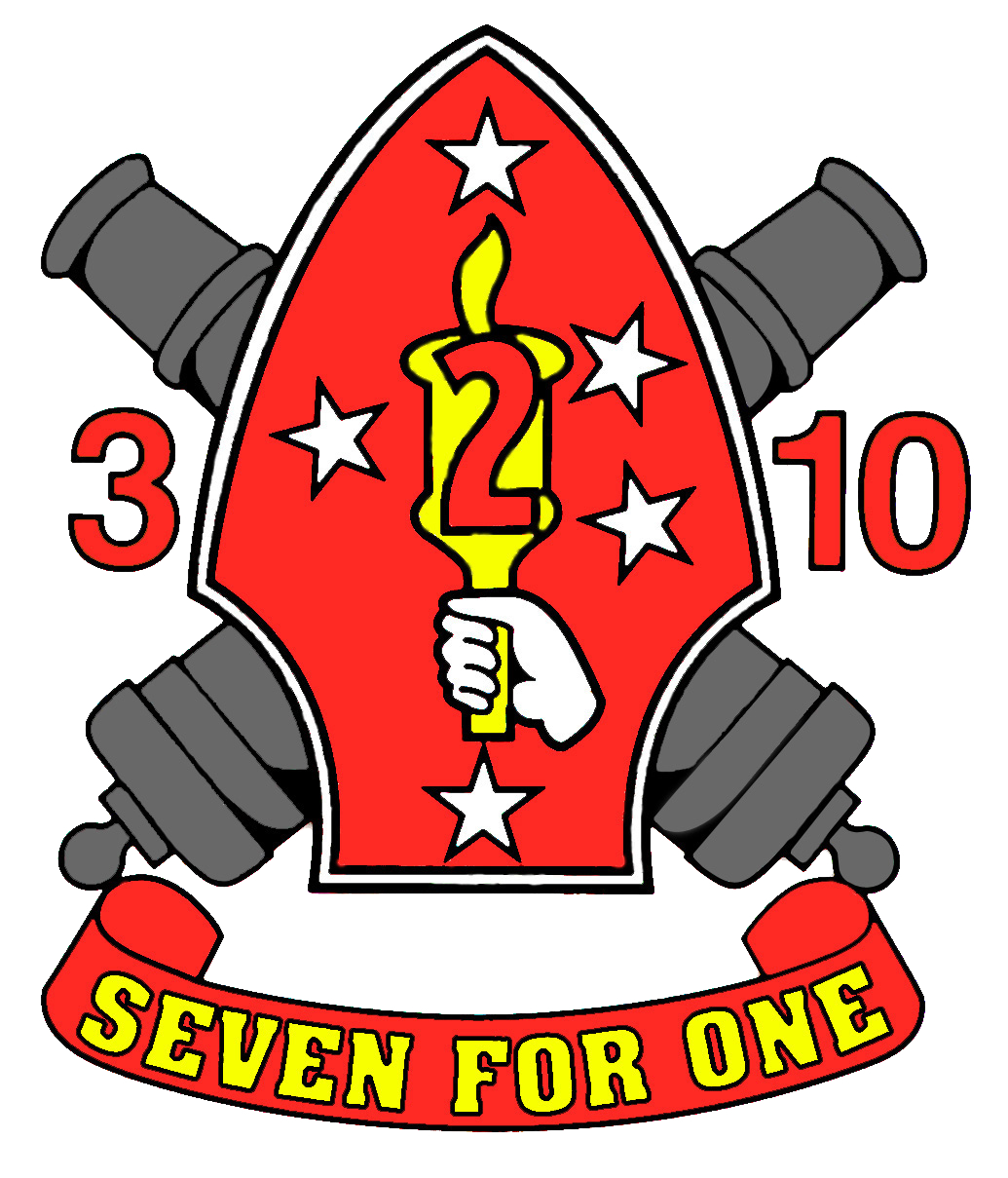
- 3/10 Insignia
- Active: June 14, 1943 – November 18, 1947; October 17, 1949 – April 26, 2013
- Country: United States
- Branch: United States Marine Corps
- Type: Artillery
- Role: Provide fires in support of 2nd Marine Division
- Part of: 10th Marine Regiment; 2nd Marine Division
- Garrison/HQ: Marine Corps Base Camp Lejeune
- Motto: "Seven for One"
- Engagements: World War II: Battle of Tarawa; Battle of Saipan; Battle of Tinian; Battle of Okinawa; Operation Desert Storm; War on terror: Operation Enduring Freedom; Operation Iraqi Freedom

3rd Battalion 10th Marines (3/10) was an artillery battalion that consisted of four cannon firing batteries and a headquarters battery. The battalion was stationed at Marine Corps Base Camp Lejeune, North Carolina and its primary weapon system was the M777-A2 howitzer with a maximum effective range of 30 km and the M-252 Expeditionary Fire Support System (EFSS). 3/10 fell under the 10th Marine Regiment and the 2nd Marine Division. The battalion was deactivated at Camp Lejeune on 26 April 2013.

== Mission ==
Provide direct support of the 2nd Marine Division in time of conflict. That support may come in the traditional fashion of artillery support to maneuver forces, or by providing batteries to serve as provisional rifle companies. They also have the secondary mission of being the primary providers of civil-military operations (CMO). CMO is defined as the activities of the commander that establish, maintain, influence, or exploit relations between military organizations, Government and civilian organizations and the civilian populace.

== Assigned Units when Deactivated ==
- Headquarters Battery
- Battery I
- Battery K
- Battery L
- Battery F 2/12

== History ==
=== World War II ===
The battalion was activated on 14 June 1943 at Pahautanui, New Zealand north of Wellington, as the 5th Battalion, 10th Marines and assigned to the 2nd Marine Division, Fleet Marine Force.

The 5/10 participated in the following World War II Campaigns:

- Tarawa
- Saipan
- Tinian
- Okinawa

The battalion was redesignated March 1, 1944, as the 3rd Battalion, 10th Marines (3/10). 3/10 participated in the occupation of Japan from September 1945 to June 1946. They relocated during July 1946 to Camp Lejeune, North Carolina, and were deactivated on November 18, 1947.

=== The Cold War & the 1990s ===
Reactivated October 17, 1949, at Camp Lejeune, North Carolina, and assigned to the 2nd Marine Division, Fleet Marine Force. The battalion participated in the Lebanon Operation, July–October 1958 and the Cuban Missile Crisis, October–December 1962. Elements of the battalion participated as part of the Multinational Peace-Keeping Force in Lebanon, August 1982 - February 1984

Parts of the battalion took part in the invasion of Grenada in October 1983. Lima and India Battery participated in Operation Sharp Edge, Liberia, in August 1990 Hotel and India Battery also participated in Operation Desert Shield and Operation Desert Storm in Southwest Asia, December 1990 - April 1991. This was followed by Hotel Battery participating in Operation Provide Comfort in Northern Iraq in April 1991. Elements of the battalion also participated in Operation Safe Harbor in Guantanamo Bay, Cuba in November–December 1991.

In August 1992, Hurricane Andrew tore through southern Florida, just 20 miles south of Miami. Within a few days, Marines from the II Marine Expeditionary Force (which included Lima Btry, India Btry. and Kilo Btry. 3/10) deployed to Homestead Air Force Base to help those left devastated by one of the worst hurricanes in U.S. history. The Marines erected two tent cities in close proximity to local neighborhoods so that residents could live under cover while they worked on their homes and got their lives back in order. Marines also provided field kitchens, generators, water purification units, and storage tanks. Joint Task Force Andrew, a relief effort headquartered in Miami, included some 29,000 Marines, sailors, soldiers, airmen and national guardsmen.

=== The Global War on Terror ===
Kilo Battery (Battery K) served as the Marine artillery attachment for the 26th Marine Expeditionary Unit from September 2001 to April 2002. During which time the battery participated in Operation Enduring Freedom in Pakistan and Afghanistan and served as the security detail for the American Embassy in Kabul.

Additional Detachments have subsequently participated in the 2003 invasion of Iraq and continued operations in both Iraq and Afghanistan. Lima Btry participated in Operation Sheltering Sky, Libera, while attached to the 26th MEU; Aug. 2003.

The Battalion Headquarters with Battery I and Battery K deployed to Helmand Province Afghanistan in support of combat operations from October 2009 to May 2010. The Battalion assumed control of all artillery survey, meteorological and sensor assets as well High-Mobility Artillery Rocket System (HIMARS) Batteries (Battery R then Battery T) from 5th Battalion, 11th Marines already in theater. Battery L served with the 24th MEU during the period while Battery F remained manned, trained and ready to deploy as required. Battery F subsequently deployed to the Afghanistan Sangin Valley in support of 3/5 from December 2010 to May 2011 as part of the 26th MEU when called to support combat operations.

== Unit awards ==
A unit citation or commendation is an award bestowed upon an organization for the action cited. Members of the unit who participated in said actions are allowed to wear on their uniforms the awarded unit citation. 3/10 has been presented with the following awards:

Ribbon	Unit Award
	Presidential Unit Citation
	Navy Unit Commendation with bronze star
	Marine Corps Expeditionary Medal
	Asiatic-Pacific Campaign Medal with four Bronze Stars
	World War II Victory Medal
	Navy Occupation Service Medal with Asia clasp
	National Defense Service Medal with three Bronze Stars
	Armed Forces Expeditionary Medal with three Bronze Stars
	Southwest Asia Service Medal with three Bronze Stars
	Iraq Campaign Medal
	Global War on Terrorism Service Medal

== See also ==
- List of United States Marine Corps battalions
- Organization of the United States Marine Corps
