= Char-e-Anjir =

Town in Helmand Province, Afghanistan

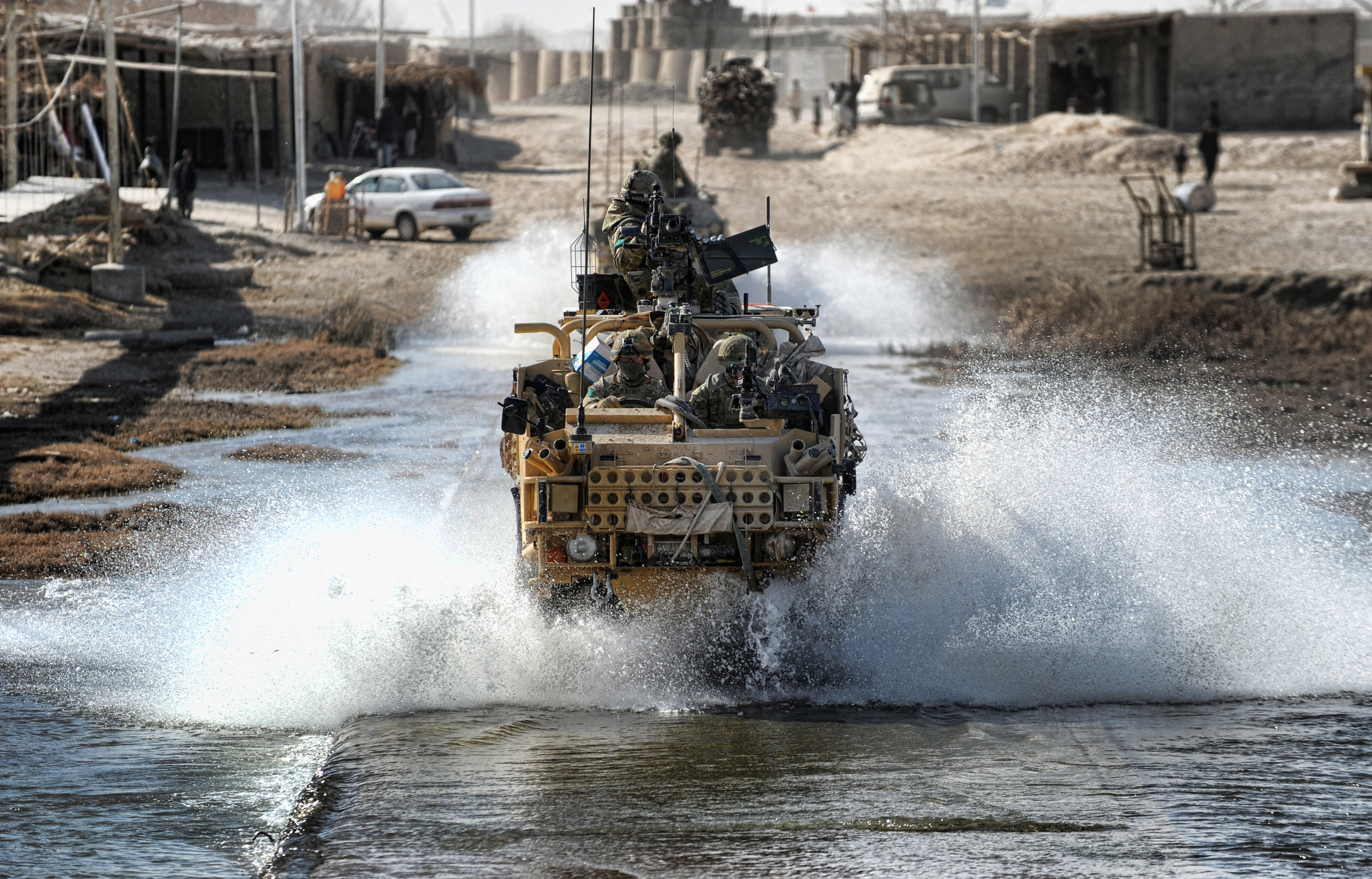
A 3rd Battalion Parachute Regiment Jackal is driven into Char-e-Anjir.

Char-e-Anjir is a town in Afghanistan. It is located just outside Lashkar Gah in Helmand Province.

In 2009 it was briefly a political flashpoint when VIPs from all over the country and local municipalities visited during the 2009 Afghan presidential election. As well in 2009 it was captured by soldiers of the Welsh Guards as part of Operation Panther's Claw.

== See also ==
- Helmand Province
