= Babaji, Afghanistan =

Rural suburb of Lashkargah, Afghanistan

Babaji باباجی
- Rural suburb
- Location in Afghanistan
- Coordinates: 31°37′4″N 64°19′34″E
- Country: Afghanistan
- Province: Helmand
- District: Lashkargah
- Time zone: UTC+4:30
- Climate: BWh

Babaji (Pashto: باباجی), is a rural suburb of Lashkargah, the capital of the southern province of Helmand in Afghanistan. It is in the Lashkargah District. Babaji is dominated by the Barakzai tribe.

== History ==
The word babaji is an Indian honorific that means "father", usually with great respect or to a priest.

During the War in Afghanistan, Babaji was the center of Operation Panther's Claw. It was launched around midnight on 19 June 2009 with the stated aim of securing control of various canal and river crossings and establishing a lasting International Security Assistance Force (ISAF) presence in an area described as "one of the main Taliban strongholds" ahead of the 2009 Afghan presidential election. In what the British Ministry of Defence described as "one of the largest air operations in modern times", according to BBC News, more than 350 troops from The Black Watch, 3rd Battalion, Royal Regiment of Scotland (3 SCOTS),(2 Rifles) transported by twelve Chinook helicopters, deployed into Babaji. The outcome was the establishment of a "firm foothold" in the area of the operation despite encountering resistance. British forces killed several insurgents during the course of the operation, which was dubbed the "Battle of Babaji" by a number of news media outlets.

On 25 June 2009, the 1st Battalion, Welsh Guards, pushed up Shamalan canal securing 14 more crossing points, cutting off the insurgents' supply route and thus preventing more Taliban fighters coming into the Babaji area.

On 20 October 2015, the Taliban seized the "British stronghold" of Babaji. Civilians fled Lashkargah and there was heavy fighting in Nad-e Ali. On 6 May 2016, Babaji was described as a string of mud villages and shops largely abandoned by civilians, and has been a battlefield for months.

On 11 December 2018, it was reported that Afghan forces recaptured Babaji area from the Taliban, who had been in control of the area for the past three years. The Babaji area is connected to Greshk and Nad Ali districts and the Taliban used the area to launch attacks on Lashkargah.

On 30 July 2020, Babaji was reported to be under taliban control

On October 11, 2020, the Taliban launched a major offensive from different directions in a bid to capture Lashkargah. The group's fighters overran security checkpoints, while a number of districts, including Babaji, also came under attack. On October 12, 2020, The governor's spokesman said the security forces had withdrawn “tactically” from their checkpoints in the Babaji area. Dozens of pro-Taliban social media accounts have posted claims about advancement on Lashkargah with the insurgents entering parts of Lashkargah.

On October 28, 2020, the Defense Ministry stated that a Key Taliban fighter which was leading the clashes against the Afghan forces in Babaji area was killed in an operation. The clearance operation was launched to push back the Taliban who had taken control of a number of areas in the past two weeks.

== Climate ==
Babaji has a hot desert climate (Köppen BWh), characterised by little precipitation and high variation between summer and winter temperatures. Summers start in mid-May, last until late-September, and are extremely dry.

== Agriculture ==
There are light-green wheat fields that grow waist-high, and narrow irrigation canals that run almost clear. It was reported that opium poppy has been grown in the 2014/15 growing season.
