= Reg District =

Reg District may refer to:

- Reg District, Kandahar, Afghanistan
- Khanashin District, Afghanistan
