= Washir =

Village in Nangarhar Province, Afghanistan

- Location in Afghanistan
- Coordinates: 32°15′8″N 63°51′11″E
- Country: Afghanistan
- Province: Helmand Province
- District: Washir District
- Elevation: 3,789 ft (1,155 m)
- Time zone: UTC+4:30

Washir (Vashir) is a village located at 32.2522°N 63.8531°E at 1,155 m altitude in a hilly area. It is the district center of Washir District, Helmand Province, Afghanistan.

== See also ==
- Helmand Province
