= Khanashin =

Location in Nangarhar Province, Afghanistan

Khanashin خان شین
- Location in Afghanistan
- Coordinates: 30°32′58″N 63°47′23″E
- Country: Afghanistan
- Province: Helmand Province
- District: Reg District (Helmand)
- Elevation: 2,106 ft (642 m)
- Time zone: UTC+4:30

Khanashin, or Khan Neshin, (other names: Khān Neshīn, Khannesin, Khan Nashin, Khān Nashīn, Khan Nashim, Khānnešīn) is a village located in the Reg District of Helmand Province, Afghanistan at 30.5494°N 63.7897°E at 642 altitude. It is close to the Helmand River and 168 km southwest of Lashkargah. It has been identified by the USGS as the site of a deposit, called the Khanneshin carbonatite, of at least 1 million tons of rare earth element ore.

== Operation Enduring Freedom ==
=== Taliban presence ===
Khan Neshin became a Taliban insurgent stronghold in the years following the 2001 invasion.

=== Operation Khanjar ===
In July 2009, U.S. Marines from 2nd Light Armored Reconnaissance Battalion and a Platoon attachment from 2nd Reconnaissance BN established the first sustained presence of coalition forces in the southern Helmand River valley by entering the village of Khan Neshin after gaining the village elders' permission.

== See also ==
- Operation Khanjar
- Helmand Province campaign
- Helmand Province
