= Washir District =

Washir واشیر
- District
- Location within Afghanistan
- Coordinates: 32°06′N 63°57′E
- Country: Afghanistan
- Province: Helmand Province

Population (2012)
  - Total: 15,200

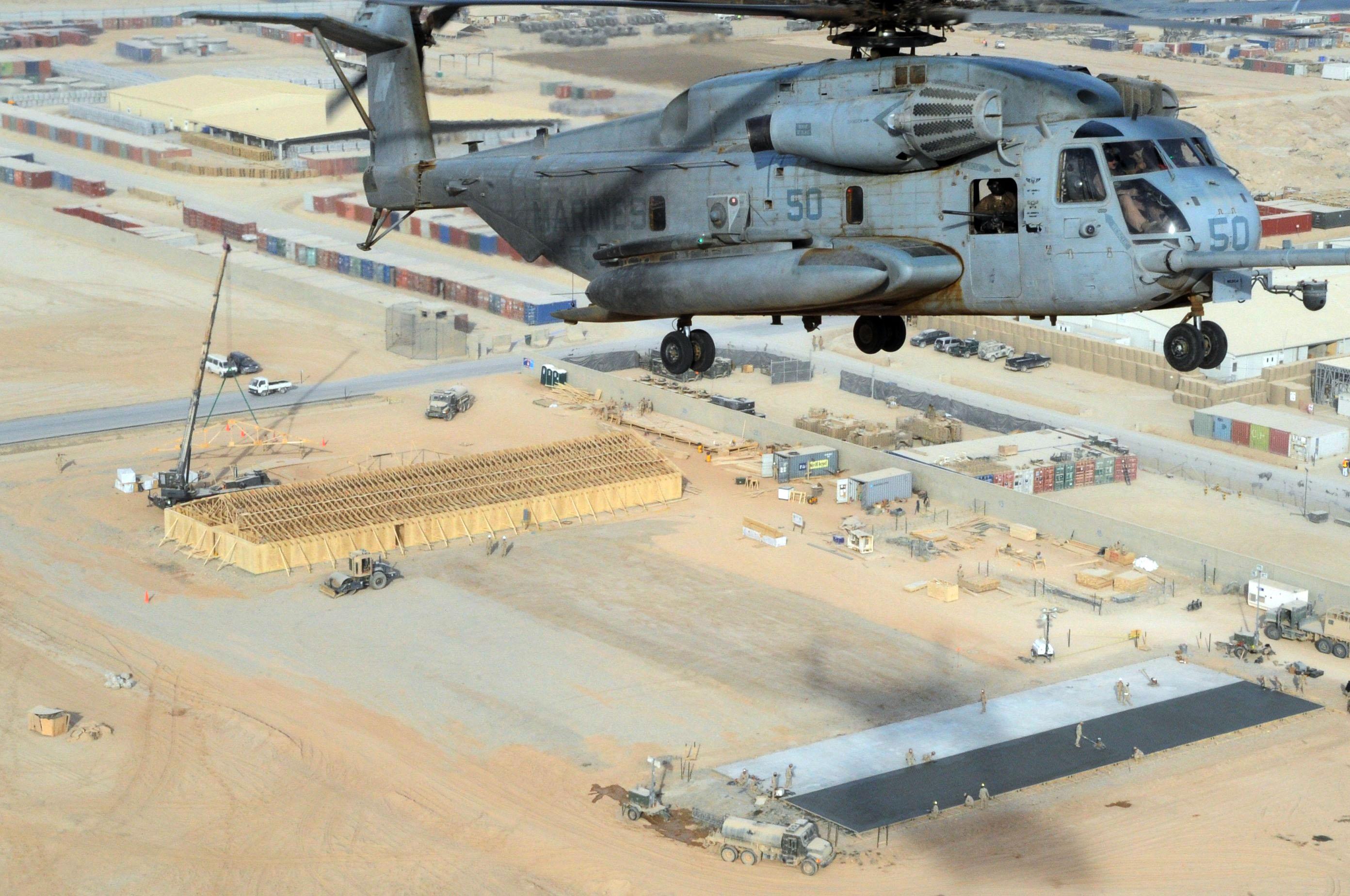
U.S. Camp Leatherneck, located inside the Washir district of Helmand Province.

Washir (Pashto: واشیر) (also Washar) is a district in the west of Helmand Province, Afghanistan. Its population was reported in 2012 as 15,200, from the Pashtun ethnic group believed to be of Noorzai tribe. The district centre is the village of Washir. The district of Washer borders Farah province to the north and is 80 kilometres south of Lashkar Gah.

Residents of Washer district lack basic amenities such as clean drinking water, health clinics, schools and other facilities.

== Taliban Insurgency ==
In June 2011, Afghan National Security Forces (ANSF) recaptured the district from Taliban insurgents during an operation called Operation Afghan Warrior, involving ANA troops from the 215th "Maiwand" Military Corps. This attack and follow-on sweep ended the four-year reign of the Taliban in the district and installed the rightful district governor in the district center. The offensive succeeded because of the brave efforts of the Afghan National Army and Afghan National Police working in conjunction with International Security Assistance Force (ISAF) coalition advisors. Local insurgent fighters had lost local support as a result the Taliban did not put up any resistance. Efforts continue to make government departments functional to resolve residents' problems within the district.
