= 2007 Helmand Province airstrikes =

NATO airstrikes in Afghanistan

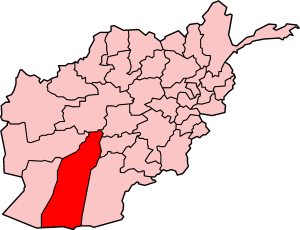
The airstrikes in Helmand Province resulted in the highest civilian deaths since 2001.

The 2007 Helmand province airstrikes were a set of airstrikes conducted by NATO on 22 June 2007 which resulted in death of at least 45 Afghan civilians. The death count in southern Helmand province was the highest since 2001, when US-led forces used heavy bombing in their campaign to drive the Taliban from power.

== Background ==
The War in Afghanistan began on October 7, 2001, in response to the September 11, 2001 attacks on the United States. This marked the beginning of the U.S. war on terror. The stated purpose of the invasion was to capture Osama bin Laden, destroy Al-Qaeda, and remove the Taliban regime which had provided support and safe harbor to Al-Qaeda.

The U.S. and Britain led the aerial bombing campaign, with ground forces supplied primarily by the Afghan Northern Alliance and supplemented by NATO troops. The U.S. military name of the conflict was Operation Enduring Freedom (OEF).

A U.N. tally shows that of civilian deaths this year, 314 were caused by international or Afghan security forces, and 279 by insurgents. A similar Associated Press count, though lower, shows the same trend: 213 killed by the U.S. or NATO and 180 by the Taliban.

== The event ==
On 22 June 2007, NATO fighters attacked alleged insurgents in South Afghanistan. They targeted several houses in the southern part of Helmand province. What is not clear is exactly how many people died. It is known that women and children were among the dead, some local leaders say over 100 people were killed. The US and NATO say they do not have civilian casualty figures.

== Afghans' reaction ==
Civilian deaths have infuriated Afghans. Afghan president Hamid Karzai has condemned the forces for carelessness and viewing Afghan lives as "cheap." He has also blamed the Taliban for using civilians as human shields. President Hamid Karzai ordered a six-man team to conduct a more thorough investigation into the dozens of deaths in Helmand province, said Sher Mohammad Akhanzada, a member of parliament from the province. Karzai accused NATO of careless operation.

== NATO's response ==
NATO, which has admitted some civilians were killed in the battle late Friday but says the number is far fewer than 45, welcomed Karzai's order.

== International reactions ==
Pakistan condemned civilian killings by NATO forces in tribal areas bordering Afghanistan.

== See also ==
- War in Afghanistan (2001–present)
