= Khanashin District =

Khanashin ریگ خان شین
- District
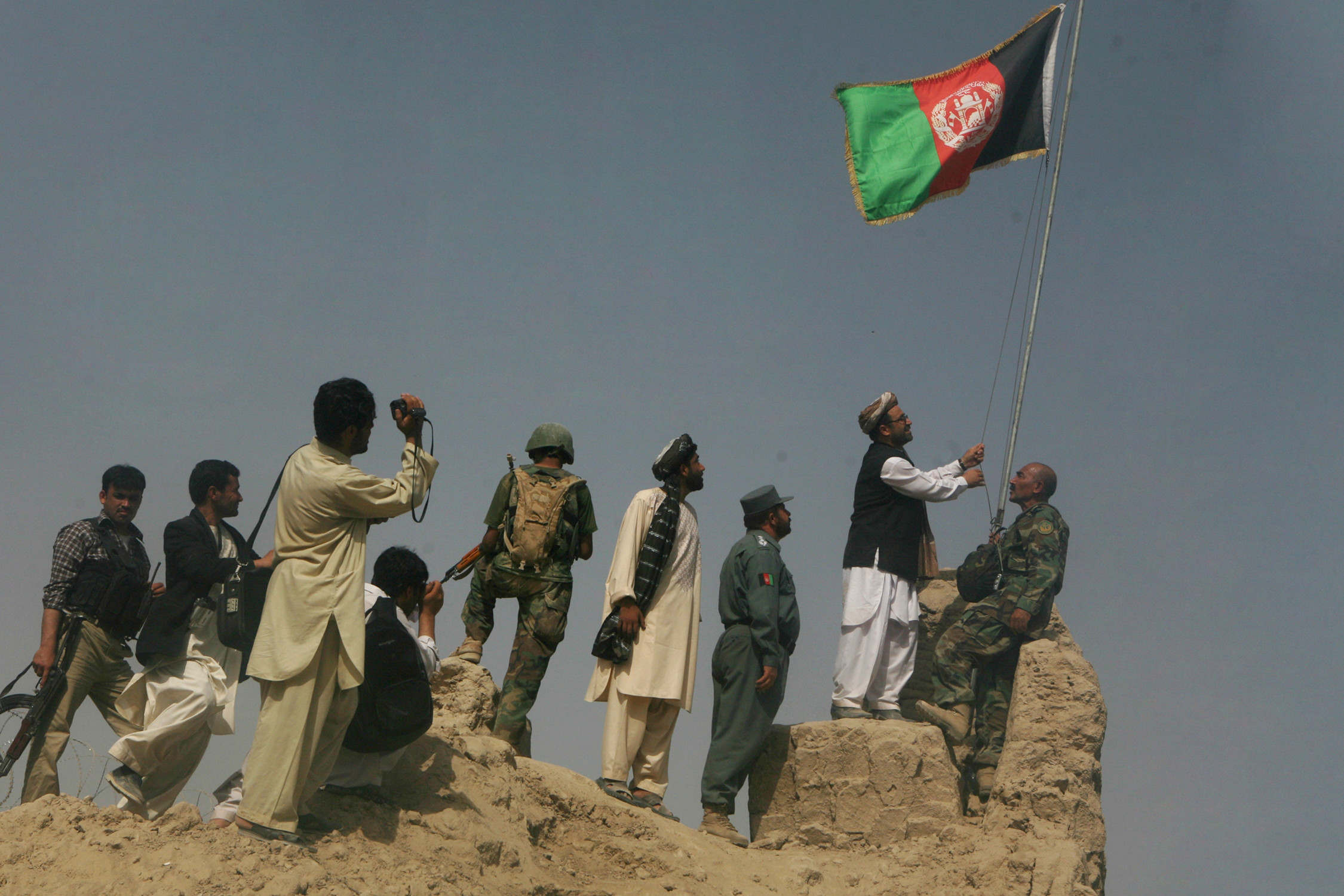
- Flag raising over Khan Neshin castle, Rig District, after Operation Khanjar.

- Location within Afghanistan
- Coordinates: 30°50′N 63°29′E
- Country: Afghanistan
- Province: Helmand Province

Population (2012)
  - Total: 25,600

Reg Khanashin District (Pashto: ریگ خان شین) is situated in the southeastern part of Helmand Province, Afghanistan along the Helmand River on its western bank. The population is 25,600 (80% Pashtun and 20% Balouch). The main village is Khanashin.

The district is almost all desert while all the villages within it reside near the Helmand River.

== Agriculture ==
Actually, the district is known as the "Green Zone" due to its abundance of vegetation. Due to irrigation controlled by the Helmand and Arghandab Valley Authority the Helmand River feeds into many canals that wind through the surrounding villages and bring water to this once desolate area, allowing local farmers to grow crops ranging from corn, okra, wheat, poppy, and marijuana. The unemployment rate is below 20% due to the surge in American troops in the region, bringing much needed safety and stability, allowing locals to move back into the area and re-open once flourishing business.

== History ==
Reg District was, for much of the Afghan War, under Taliban control, until it was taken by ISAF forces in July 2009 during Operation Khanjar.

== Natural Resources ==
Geologists also discovered rare earth minerals and niobium deposits in the Khanneshin area of Southern Helmand province with an estimated value of more than $89 billion
