= Operation Panther's Claw =

2009 British Afghan War military operation

- Part of the War in Afghanistan (2001–2021)
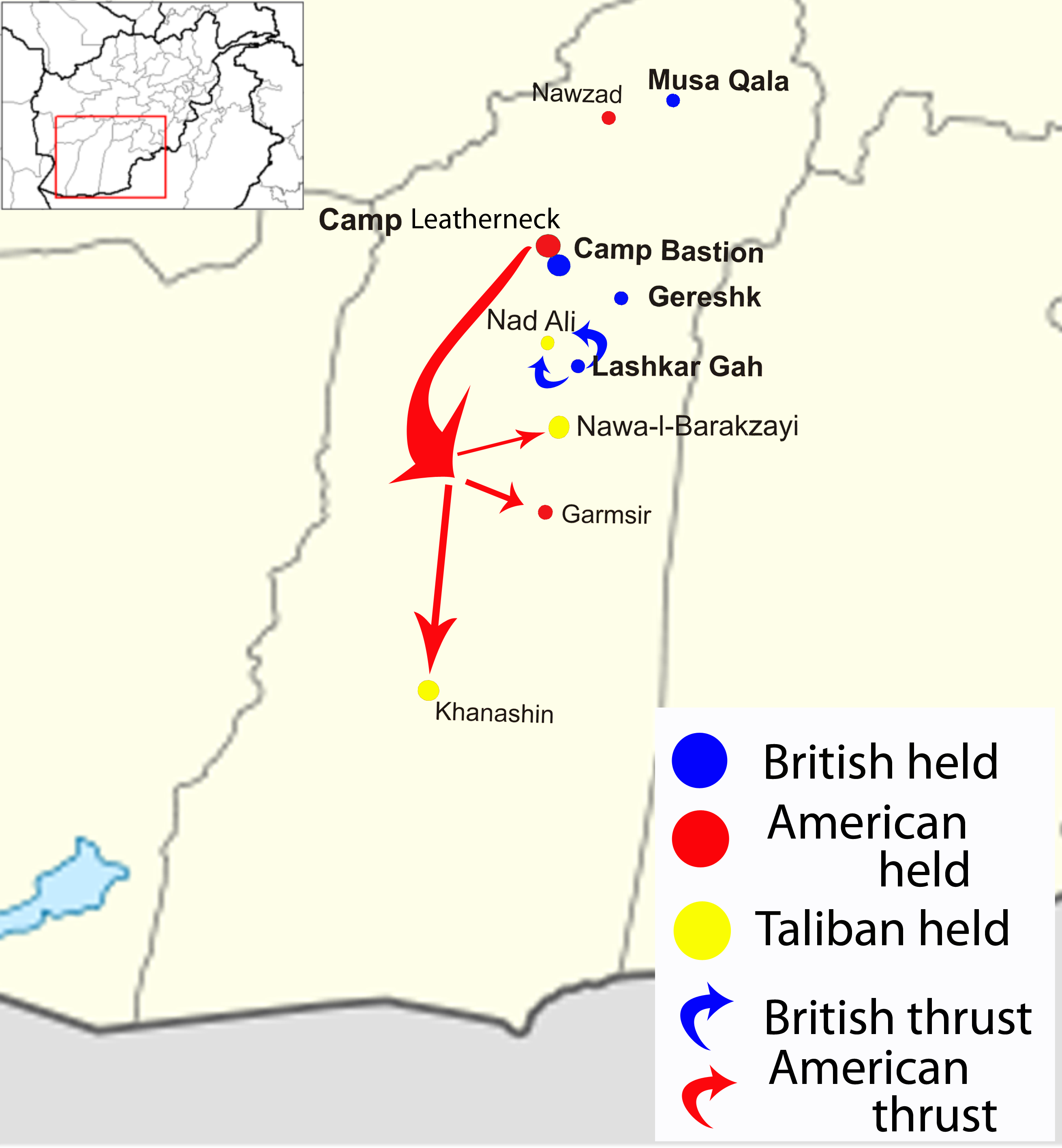
- Operation Panther's Claw in blue; Operation Strike of the Sword in red
Date	19 June – 20 August 2009 (Main part of the operation ended on 27 July)
Location	Helmand Province, Afghanistan
Result	Coalition victory

Belligerents
Afghanistan; United Kingdom; Denmark; Estonia; United States	(Afghanistan) Taliban

Commanders and leaders
(United Kingdom) Brigadier Tim Radford; (Denmark) Colonel Frank Lissner	

Strength
(United Kingdom) 3,000; (Denmark) 700<; (Afghanistan) 650; (Estonia) 140	500 insurgents (British estimate)

Casualties and losses
(Afghanistan) 12 soldiers killed; (Afghanistan) 4 PMCs killed; (United Kingdom) 10 killed	200+ killed (British claim)

Operation Panchai Palang, or Panther's Claw, was a coalition military operation of the War in Afghanistan in Helmand Province in southern Afghanistan. It aimed to secure various canal and river crossings to establish a permanent International Security Assistance Force (ISAF) presence in the area. The commander of the operation declared the first stage a success on 27 July 2009.

== Background ==
=== British forces in Helmand ===
Soon after the Taliban insurgency took root in Afghanistan large tracts of Helmand Province came under Taliban control. Of all of Afghanistan's provinces, Helmand "has been the most difficult" for coalition forces, according to BBC News foreign correspondent Ian Pannell, and holds the largest Taliban presence.

British forces deployed to Helmand in 2006, formally assuming responsibility for security in the province from US forces on 1 May 2006. In Helmand, described as "the centre of the Taliban insurgency", they faced heavy combat and regular attacks by Taliban fighters.

According to Pannell, the "latest figures" show that more than 10 attacks took place each day in Helmand Province as of July 2009, and most of the nearly 170 British forces fatalities in Afghanistan since 2001 prior to Panther's Claw were caused by the Taliban in Helmand.

=== Taking and holding ground ===
Panther's Claw was preceded by several other operations carried out by British and Afghan government forces with the purpose of "taking and holding ground" in Helmand Province.

Operation Zafar, launched on 27 April, lasted one week and involved more than 200 troops of the Afghan National Army (ANA) and Afghan National Police, supported by elements of the Mercian Regiment and The Royal Gurkha Rifles, respectively. The operation succeeded in clearing the Taliban from several villages around Basharan in central Helmand, killing "many Taliban insurgents" according to the Ministry of Defence (MoD) at a cost of only "handful" of ANA and British casualties.

Zafar 2, launched on 19 May, and lasting four days, saw British troops deployed to secure an area so that a checkpoint—to be manned by Afghan forces—could be built on a key route into the provincial capital Lashkar Gah. On 29 May, soldiers from the Royal Regiment of Fusiliers engaged and drove out Taliban fighters near the village of Yatimchay, south of Musa Qala.

Lt Col Nick Richardson, spokesman for Task Force Helmand, credited the arrival of additional American forces in Helmand with increasing the operational capability of International Security Assistance Force (ISAF) forces in the province and helping to open the way for Panther's Claw.

== The Operation ==
=== Airborne assault ===
Panther's Claw was launched around midnight on 19 June 2009^{a} with the stated aim of securing control of various canal and river crossings and establishing a lasting ISAF presence in an area described by Lt Col Richardson as "one of the main Taliban strongholds" ahead of the 2009 Afghan presidential election.

In what the Ministry of Defence described as "one of the largest air operations in modern times", according to BBC News, more than 350 troops from The Black Watch, 3rd Battalion, Royal Regiment of Scotland (3 SCOTS),(2 Rifles) transported by twelve Chinook helicopters, deployed into Babaji, north of the provincial capital Lashkar Gah, in Helmand Province. The operation, which involved thirteen other aircraft—including Apache and UH-60 Black Hawk helicopters, Harriers, unmanned aerial vehicles, and an AC-130H Spectre gunship—involved both British and American air power, and was supported by more than 150 ground forces from the Black Watch and Royal Engineers.

Taliban fighters in the area launched multiple attacks against British forces, all of which were repelled, and 3 SCOTS secured three key crossings—the Lui Mandey Wadi crossing, the Nahr e-Burgha canal and the Shamalan canal—by 23 June. To restrict movement by Taliban forces, British troops also constructed several checkpoints to be manned by 3 SCOTS but eventually ceded to the Afghan National Police.

==== Outcome ====
According to Lt Col Stephen Cartwright, commanding officer of the Black Watch, 3 SCOTS established a "firm foothold" in the area of the operation despite encountering resistance. Lt Col Richardson reported that British forces killed several insurgents during the course of the operation, which was dubbed the "Battle of Babaji" by a number of news media outlets.

On 23 June, the MoD reported that British troops involved in Panther's Claw discovered 1.3 tonnes of poppy seed the day before, as well as improvised explosive devices (IEDs)—which they disabled—and anti-personnel land mines. Analysis of a sample of the crop by the Food and Agriculture Organization of the United Nations in Kabul, however, revealed the haul to be of mung beans.

=== Insurgent supply line cut off ===
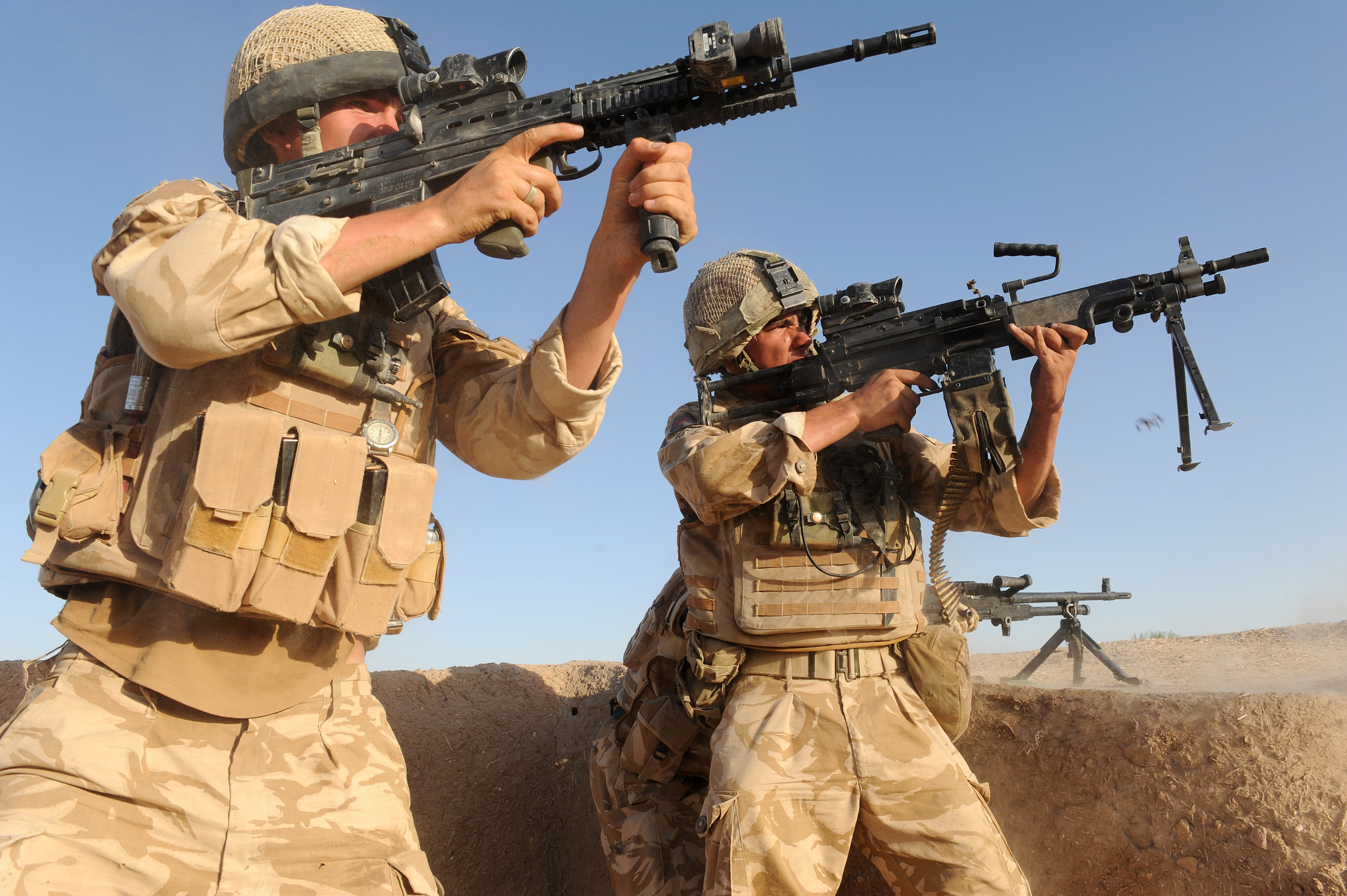
Welsh Guards engage Taliban forces on 27 June 2009 as part of Operation Panther's Claw.

On 25 June, the 1st Battalion, Welsh Guards with attachments from 4th Bn The Rifles, pushed up Shamalan canal securing 14 more crossing points, cutting off the insurgents' supply route and thus preventing more Taliban fighters coming into the Babaji area.

=== Third wave ===
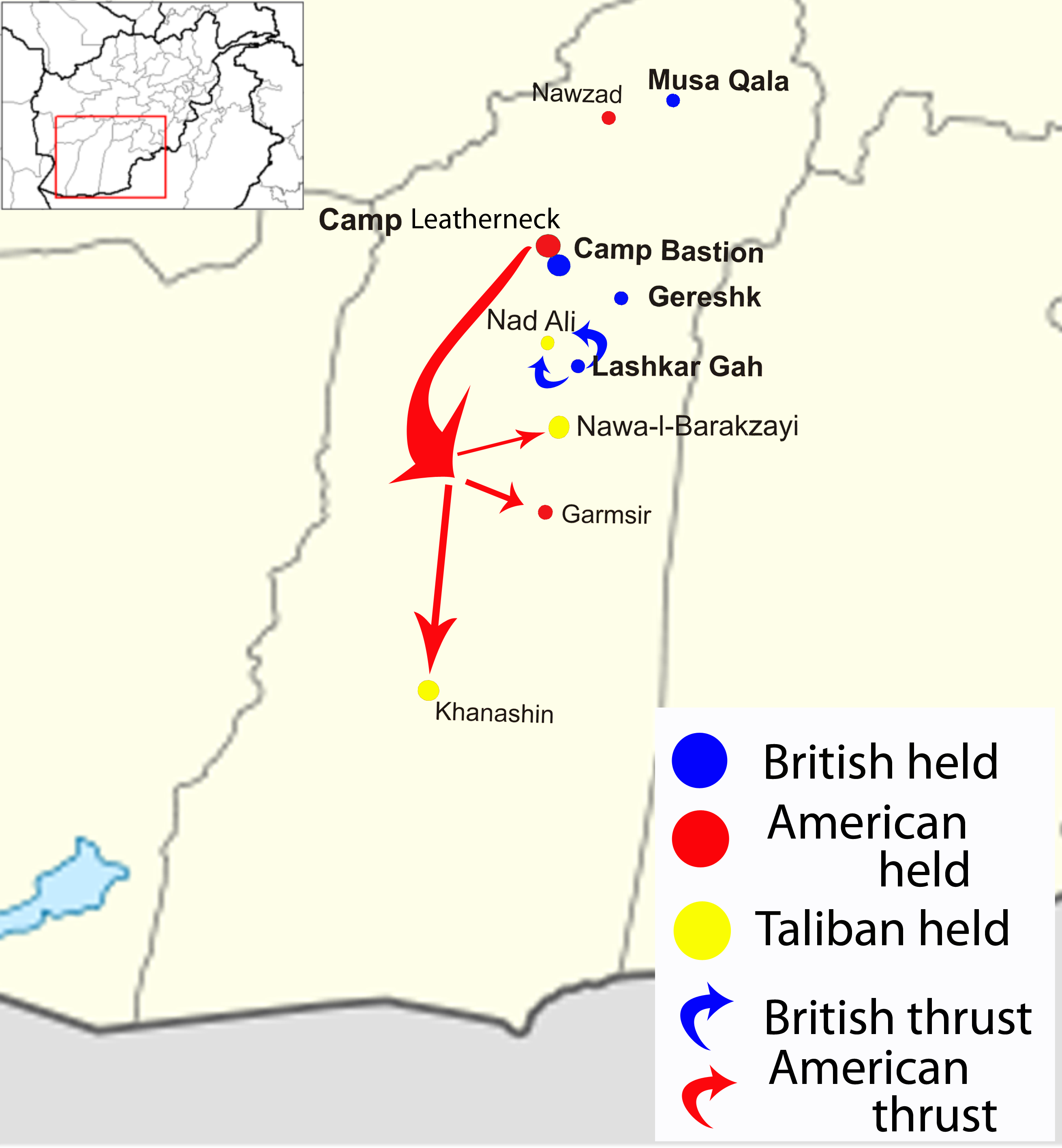
Blue shows British operation

In the third phase of Panther's Claw, more than 700 British soldiers from the Light Dragoons and 2nd Battalion, Mercian Regiment (Worcesters and Foresters) supported by soldiers of the Danish Battle Group, launched a ground offensive, backed by fire support, against Taliban-held areas north of Lashkar Gah. The assault was timed to coincide with Operation Khanjar, or Strike of the Sword, launched on 2 July, by American forces against Taliban strongholds in the Helmand River valley.

The BBC reported that British troops had by 3 July, "taken some key towns", but that their progress was impeded by insufficient resources. By 4 July, British forces had encountered "little resistance" —in contrast to American and Afghan forces to the south participating in Khanjar who were engaged in "fierce" fighting against the Taliban. As of 5 July, around 3,000 Task Force Helmand troops from the United Kingdom, Denmark, Estonia, and Afghan government forces were involved in Panther's Claw, with the British MoD reporting close quarters combat with Taliban fighters.

On 5 July, Danish Daily Politiken reported that between 55-65 soldiers or nearly half the corps, of the Danish Special Forces unit Jægerkorpset had been deployed in the operation, with the primary objective to aid regulars of the Danish Army secure 13 bridges over a major irrigation canal in the area. It's one of the largest known deployments of Danish special forces on foreign soil, and the largest since 2002.

=== Second stage ===
After declaring the first stage of the operation a success on 27 July 2009, UK forces commenced the second stage, which focused on holding ground won from the Taliban in previous weeks.

== Casualties ==
- 19 June: On the first day of the operation, one British soldier, Sean Birchall, a major from the 1st Battalion Welsh Guards, was killed in an explosion near Lashkar Gah.
- 23 June: Lt Col Richardson of Task Force Helmand reported that British forces killed several Taliban fighters during operations in the vicinity of Babaji.
- 1 July: A Danish diversion attack was halted by pockets of resistance and sniper fire. When clearing a compound to be used as camp for the night, one Danish soldier was severely wounded, when he knelt down and triggered the pressure plate of an IED.
- 1 July: Two British soldiers—Lt Col Rupert Thorneloe, commanding officer of the 1st Battalion Welsh Guards and Tpr Joshua Hammond of the 2nd Royal Tank Regiment—died, and six were wounded, near Shamalan Canal, at Lashkar Gah, when an IED exploded under their BvS 10 Viking armoured vehicle. Lt Col Thorneloe is the highest-ranking British army officer to be killed in action since Lt Col 'H'. Jones in the Falklands War and the highest-ranking to die in Afghanistan.
- 4 July: Two more British soldiers were killed, one from 2nd Battalion, Mercian Regiment by a rocket-propelled grenade and a second from the Light Dragoons, by an IED, near Gereshk.
- 5 July: A member of the 1st Battalion Welsh Guards was killed in an explosion near Lashkar Gah.
- 7 July: A member of the Light Dragoons was killed in an explosion near Gereshk.
- 9–10 July: The Ministry of Defence announced that eight British soldiers had been killed within a 24-hour period, bringing the total number of fatalities of British Forces personnel in Afghanistan since 2001 to 184. Another 30 soldiers were wounded during that 24-hour period. Three of these soldiers were killed while supporting operation Panther's Claw.
- 16 July: A member of 2nd Battalion, The Rifles, was killed in an explosion near Gereshk.

== See also ==
- List of military operations in the war in Afghanistan (2001–2021)
- Operation Khanjar

== Notes ==
- ^a According to the Ministry of Defence, the soldiers from the Black Watch were dropped into Babaji "just before midnight on Friday 19 June 2009". According to BBC News, the soldiers were dropped "just after midnight local time on Friday".
