= Garmsir =

Location in Helmand Province, Afghanistan

- Location in Afghanistan
- Coordinates: 31°7′N 64°12′E
- Country: Afghanistan
- Province: Helmand Province
- District: Garmsir District

Government
  - Type: Governor & Community Council
  - District Governor: Haji Abdullah Jan
- Elevation: 2,343 ft (714 m)
- Time zone: UTC+4:30

Garmsir (Pashto: ګرمسير; from Persian گرمسیر, meaning "hot place") is the center of Garmsir District in Helmand Province, Afghanistan. It is situated on the eastern bank of the Helmand River on 31.1167°N 64.2000°E at 714 m altitude and 63 km southwest of Lashkargah. The major road at Garmsir is Route 605. The hospital is called Hazar Juft Comprehensive Health Clinic.

Prince Harry spent time in the village during his 2008 period in the country.

== Climate ==
Garmsir has a hot desert climate (Köppen BWh), characterised by little precipitation and high variation between summer and winter temperatures. The average temperature in Garmsir is 21.3 °C, while the annual precipitation averages 83 mm. July is the hottest month of the year with an average temperature of 33.8 °C. The coldest month January has an average temperature of 8.6 °C.

Climate data for Garmsir
Month	Jan	Feb	Mar	Apr	May	Jun	Jul	Aug	Sep	Oct	Nov	Dec	Year
Mean daily maximum °C (°F)	15.9 (60.6)	19.0 (66.2)	25.5 (77.9)	30.5 (86.9)	36.7 (98.1)	41.8 (107.2)	42.6 (108.7)	40.9 (105.6)	36.7 (98.1)	30.9 (87.6)	23.4 (74.1)	17.8 (64.0)	30.1 (86.3)
Daily mean °C (°F)	8.6 (47.5)	11.5 (52.7)	17.5 (63.5)	22.1 (71.8)	27.7 (81.9)	32.2 (90.0)	33.8 (92.8)	31.5 (88.7)	26.4 (79.5)	20.6 (69.1)	13.9 (57.0)	9.4 (48.9)	21.3 (70.3)
Mean daily minimum °C (°F)	1.3 (34.3)	4.1 (39.4)	9.5 (49.1)	13.7 (56.7)	18.8 (65.8)	22.6 (72.7)	25.1 (77.2)	22.2 (72.0)	16.2 (61.2)	10.3 (50.5)	4.5 (40.1)	1.1 (34.0)	12.5 (54.4)
Source: Climate-Data.org

== Conflict ==
Garmsir was the scene of heavy fighting during April–September 2008 when U.S. Marines from the 24th MEU arrived to reinforce British and Afghan forces.

In July 2009, Marines taking part in Operation Khanjar met little or no resistance initially. By July 5, elements of the 2nd Battalion, 8th Marines were engaged in heavy fighting with Taliban militants.

== Notable people ==
- Muhammad bin Bakhtiyar Khalji, founder of the Khalji dynasty of Bengal (1204–1227)

== See also ==
- Camp Dwyer
- Forward Operating Base Delhi
- JTAC Cornet Harry Wales
- Mullah Abdul Karim (Guantanamo detainee 520)
- Helmand Province campaign

== See also ==
- Helmand Province
