= Lashkargah District =

Lashkargah لشکرگاه
- District
- Location within Afghanistan
- Coordinates: 31°28′N 64°32′E
- Country: Afghanistan
- Province: Helmand Province

Population (2012)
  - Total: 100,200

Lashkargah (Pashto: لشکرګاه) is a district in the east of Helmand Province, Afghanistan, surrounding the provincial capital of Lashkargah. Its population is 99% Pashtun and 0.2% Baluch, with, 0.8% are Hindus and Hazara; the population was estimated at 43,934 in 2018. It is mainly a desert and is sparsely populated.
