= Operation Strike of the Sword =

2009, US & UK v. Taliban, Afghanistan

- Part of the War in Afghanistan (2001–2021)
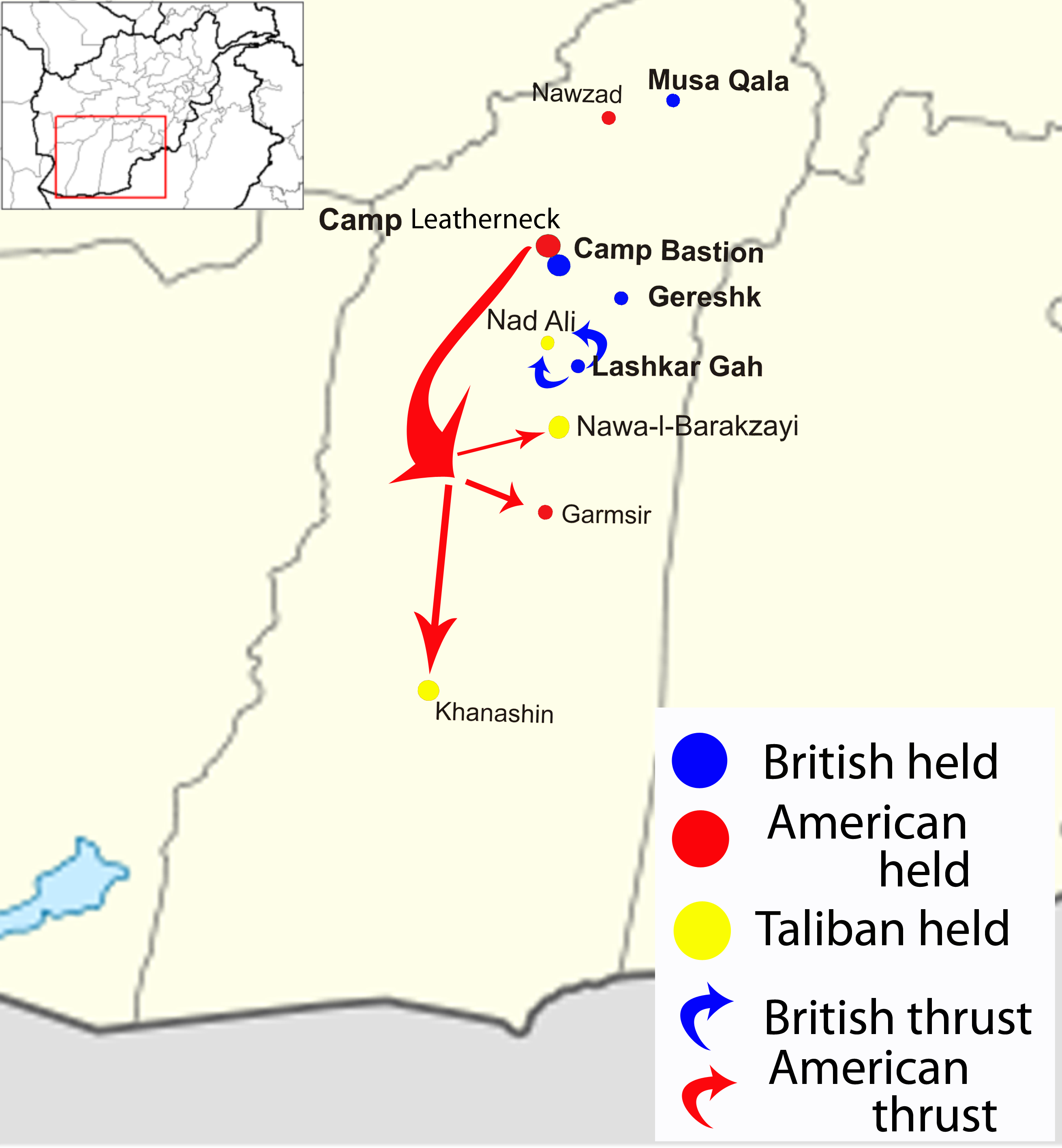
- Operation Strike of the Sword in red; Operation Panther's Claw in blue
Date	July 2 – August 20, 2009
Location	Helmand province in Afghanistan
Result	Inconclusive, See Aftermath

Belligerents
United States; United Kingdom; Islamic Republic of Afghanistan	(Afghanistan) Taliban

Commanders and leaders
(United States) Brig. Gen. Lawrence D. Nicholson	(Afghanistan) Mullah Abdullah Zakir

Strength
(United States) 4,000 U.S. Marines (Afghanistan) 650 ANA soldiers	Unknown

Casualties and losses
(Afghanistan) 2 soldiers killed (Afghanistan) 1 interpreter killed	Per Coalition Claims; At least 49–62 killed

Operation Strike of the Sword or Operation Khanjar was a US-led offensive in Helmand province in southern Afghanistan. About 4,000 Marines from the 2nd Marine Expeditionary Brigade as well as 650 Afghan troops were involved, supported by NATO planes. The operation began when units moved into the Helmand River valley in the early hours of July 2, 2009. This operation was the largest Marine offensive since the Battle of Fallujah in 2004. The operation was also the biggest offensive airlift by the Marines since the Vietnam War.

The Marines pushed into primarily three significant towns along a 75-mile stretch of the Helmand River valley south of Lashkar Gah. At least two Marine infantry battalions and one Marine Light Armored Reconnaissance (LAR) battalion spearheaded the operation. In the north, 2nd Battalion, 8th Marines (2/8) pushed into Garmsir district. In central Helmand, 1st Battalion, 5th Marines (1/5) pushed into Nawa-I-Barakzayi to the south of Lashkar Gah, 2nd Light Armored Reconnaissance Battalion (2nd LAR) entered Khanashin in the Khan Neshin district.

== Background ==
=== Taliban stronghold ===
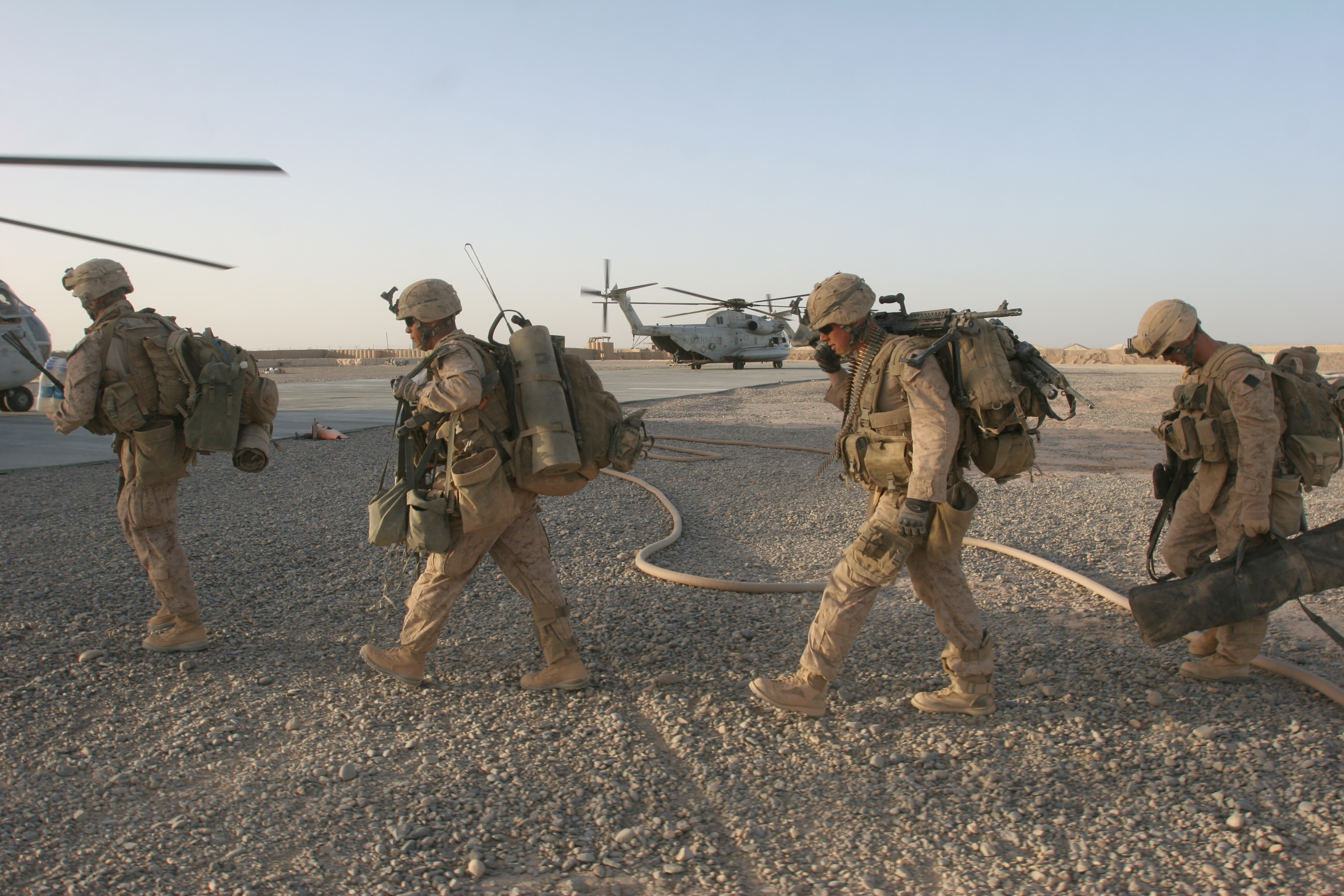
Marines from 2nd Battalion, 8th Marines boarding CH-53 helicopters at the start of the operation.

Since 2001, Helmand province was considered to be a Taliban stronghold and had been one of the most dangerous provinces for coalition forces in Afghanistan, with British troops being locked in a stalemate since 2006. The large expanse of land made controlling the province difficult, while volunteers from across the Muslim world and hundreds of local Afghan nationals continued to join the insurgency. There was a growing concern among U.S. military and intelligence officials that much of the violence that has plagued Helmand was linked to a flow of fighters and munitions particularly from Pakistan's Balochistan region.

=== Troop surge ===
To help staunch the increasingly violent Taliban insurgency, President Obama, on February 18, 2009, approved an increase in US forces in Afghanistan, akin to President Bush's Iraq War troop surge of 2007. By early June 2009, over 10,000 Marines had poured into southern Afghanistan, the first wave of the 21,000 troop surge.

=== Military challenges ===
The town of Nawzad became a clear example to Afghanistan experts of the challenges facing US forces as they sought to change the tide of the war with a limited number of troops. The town has been the scene of a stalemate since 2006. Neither British nor Estonian forces were able to dominate the region. Since taking over in March 2008, U.S. Marines too met a similar standstill.

For months, a lone company of Marines was assigned to the town. Requests for reinforcements were turned down as senior Marine commanders had to give priorities to areas with more civilians. Even though outright victory wasn't possible, the idea behind a single company of Marines "slugging it out" with the Taliban was to keep the insurgents occupied there while other units could win less battles and more hearts and more minds elsewhere.

In April 2009, with three battalions in the region (3/8, 2/3, 2/14), the Marines were finally able to succeed in pushing back the front line by a few hundred yards and creating a larger buffer around the U.S. positions. A substantial number of insurgents were also believed to be killed.

However, by the end of June 2009, the town was still locked in a stalemate and the town remained a ghost town.

=== Political pressure ===
In addition, the Afghanistan presidential elections, scheduled to be held on August 20, 2009, were increasingly being questioned. Critics asked how a meaningful national election could be held when Taliban militants controlled so much of southern Afghanistan.

=== Operation goals ===
Adm. Michael Mullen, Chairman of the Joint Chiefs of Staff, described the goal of the operation was not just driving out the Taliban from areas they control, but securing the area to allow the Afghan government to operate. Brigadier General Larry Nicholson, commander of 2nd MEB, declared that the operation was aimed to improve security ahead of presidential elections, allowing voter registration where before there was none. The Marines would overwhelmingly assault and then consolidate the ISAF's hold in the region.

== Timeline ==
=== Military action begins ===
The conflict began around 1:00 a.m. local time when Marines from 1st Battalion, 5th Marines (1/5), were dropped by CH-47s and UH-60s helicopters of the 82nd Airborne Division, into dirt fields around the town of Nawa-l-Barakzayi, south of Lashkar Gah. The first shots of the operation were fired at daybreak (around 6:15 a.m.) when a Marine unit received small-arms fire from a tree-line. Cobra attack helicopters were called in and made strafing runs at the tree line from where the fire was coming from. Simultaneously, Marines from 2nd Battalion, 8th Marines (2/8), were dropped by helicopters just outside the town of Sorkh-Duz. The town of Sork-Duz lies between Nawa-l-Barakzayi and Garmsir. Temperatures reached over 100 °F (38 °C).

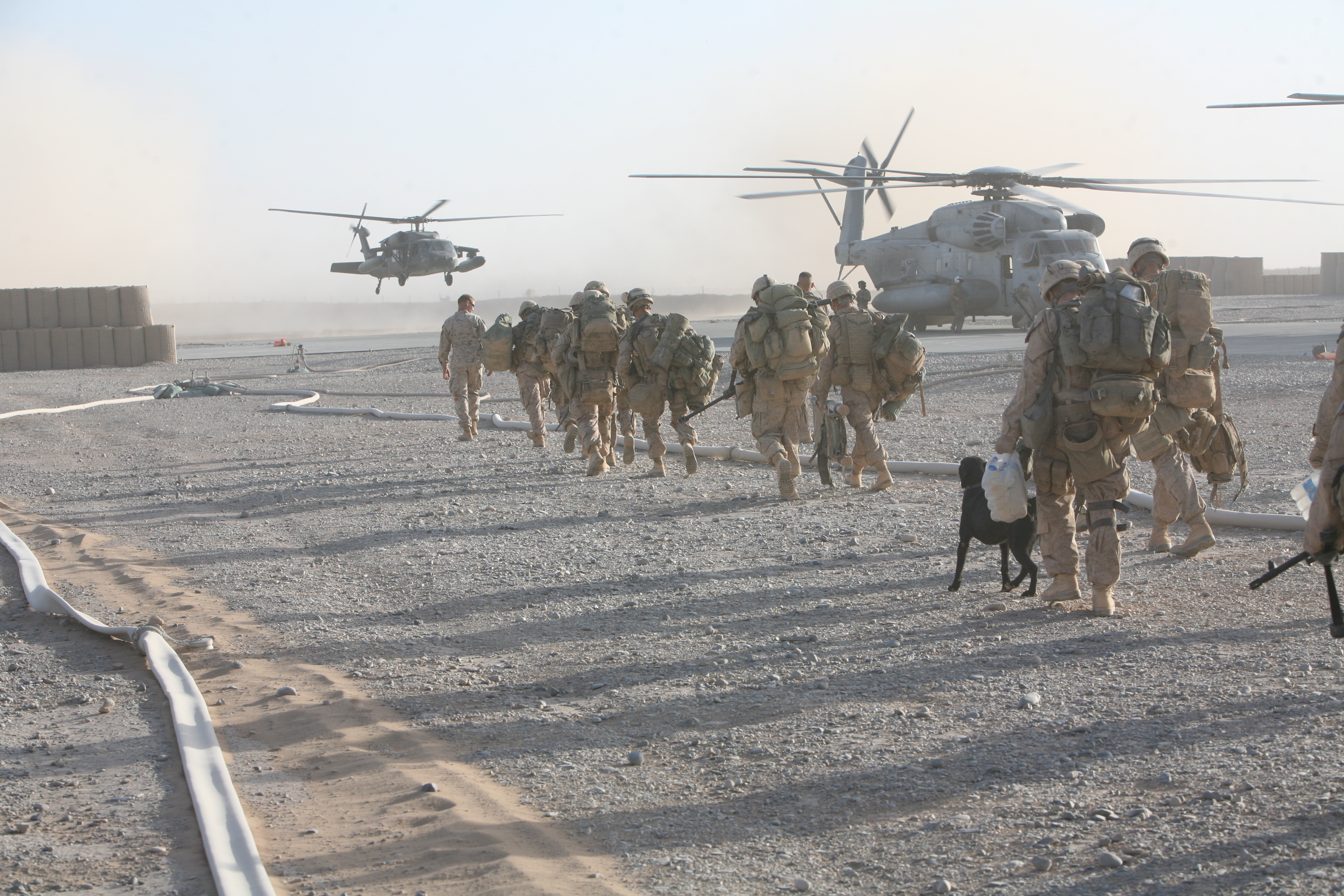
Marines from 2/8 board helicopters at Camp Dwyer, July 2, 2009

Video, Operation Khanjar, Part I, "Send in the Reinforcements", United States Marine Corps with support from Afghan National Army, An additional 4,000 U.S. Marines are deployed to the Helmand province. Published July 31, 2009.

Video, Operation Khanjar, Part II, "Mission Launch", United States Marine Corps with support from Afghan National Army, About 25 helicopters fly back and forth dropping U.S. Marines throughout the Helmand River valley. Published July 31, 2009.

=== U.S. restraint ===
Although the operation was meant to eliminate the Taliban threat, the operation's principal focus was to win the locals' confidence and protect them from Taliban threat. To affirm this, Marine units throughout exercised military restraint when encountering enemy insurgents. Although the troops encountered roadside bombs and small-arms attacks, which resulted in the death of one Marine and several others wounded, commanders opted to mute their return fire. In the first 24 hours of the operation, the Marines did not fire artillery or call for fighter planes to drop bombs.

Civilian casualties was an issue Gen. Stanley McChrystal, the U.S. Forces Afghanistan and ISAF commander, underscored prior to the operation, as it was one sure way of losing the locals' hearts and minds regardless of how many human shields the Taliban would go through on a single day. McChrystal further elaborated the need for constant surveillance to foil Taliban attempts to murder civilians while claiming US collateral damage. Though troops in similar circumstances might have called in airstrikes, Marine commanders practiced what they called "tactical patience" in a conscious effort to further minimize coalition civilian casualties in the face of strict Rules of Engagement.

On the first day, July 2, Marines from 1/5 made contact with a group of about 20 militants holed up in a mud-brick compound in Nawa-l-Barakzayi. The Marines refrained from calling in a fixed-wing airstrike and instead used the 20mm guns from their AH-1W SuperCobra helicopter gunships to avoid the risk of civilian casualties. The militants managed to escape. Though fired upon, Marines refrained from destroying many compounds because they could not confirm if civilians were inside

Marine officers distributed handbills explaining their presence and talked to residents with the help of interpreters. Some Marine companies, out of respect as well as to safeguard the locals from Taliban reprisals, bedded down for the night in empty homes "with the permission of the hearts and minds of the people", instead of constructing bases with razor wire and sand-filled barriers.

=== Garmsir district ===
Marines from 2nd Battalion 8th Marines (2/8) met little or no resistance initially. On July 3, Taliban fighters in a walled compound in Garmsir engaged Marines for eight hours until an AV-8B Harrier II attack jet from VMA-214 destroyed the compound with a 500-pound bomb, killing all of the estimated 30–40 Taliban inside. No Marines were reported wounded in the action, although it delayed U.S. plans to meet with village elders and some locals. Marines from 2/8 conducted joint patrols with the Afghan National Army in and around the town of Sorkh-Duz.

By July 5, elements of 2/8 were engaged in heavy fighting at Toshtay, 16 miles south of Garmsir.

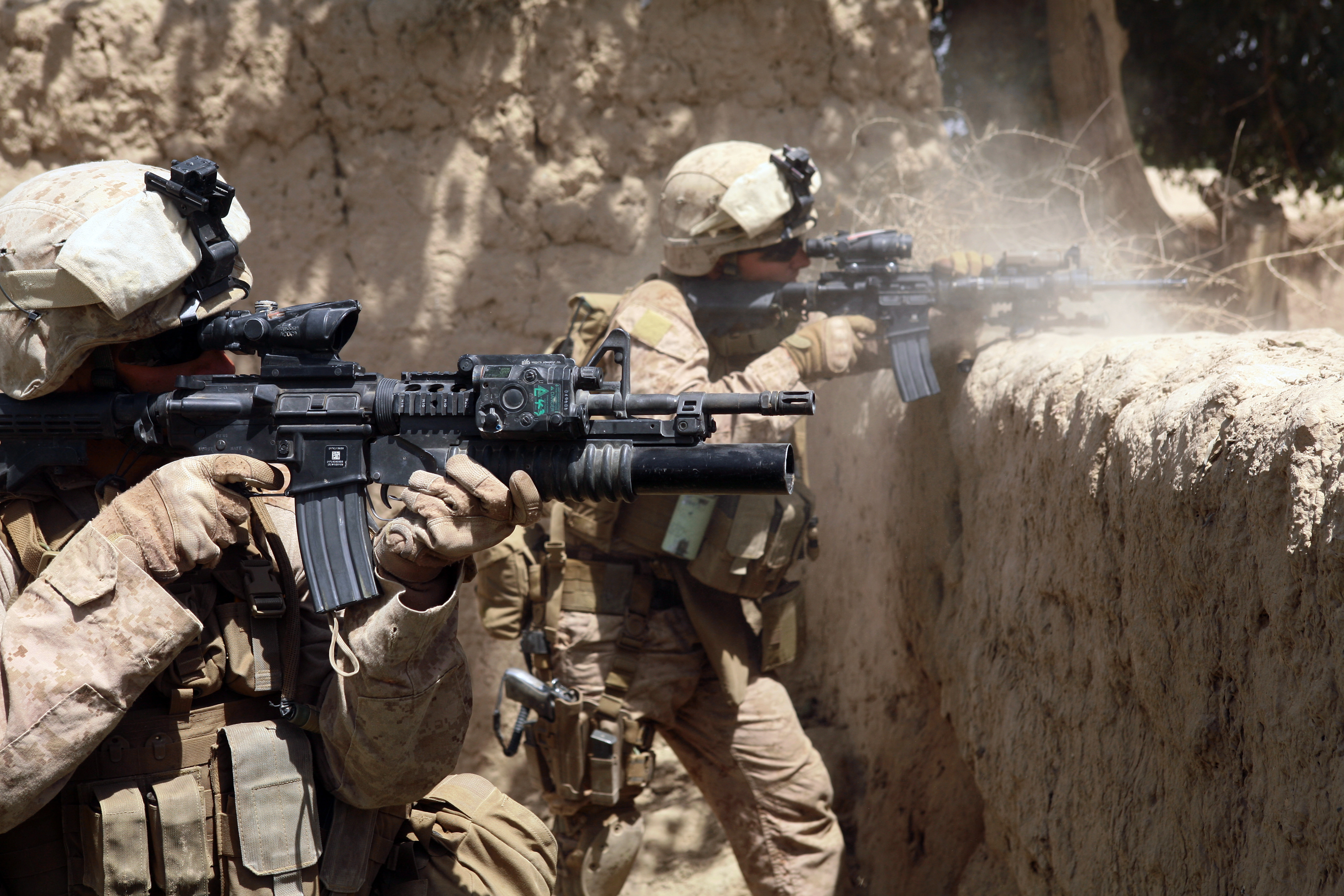
Marines from 2/8 firing on an enemy position in Garmsir, July 3, 2009

Video, Operation Khanjar, Part III, United States Marine Corps with support from Afghan National Army, A company of US Marines are on patrol in the village of Sorkh-Duz, in Garmsir, Helmand Province. They've been invited by the district governor. Their mission is to win over the local people. Published August 4, 2009.

=== Nawa-l-Barakzayi district ===
Hundreds of Marines from 1st Battalion 5th Marines (1/5) were lifted by helicopter into the village of Nawa-I-Barakzayi, encountering sporadic resistance. Marine commanders noted that Taliban forces seemed to have withdrawn for the time being to observe the Marines.

On July 24, Marines from Company F, 2nd Battalion, 8th Marine Regiment, Regimental Combat Team 3, along with ANA Troops, raided a Taliban compound. Five insurgents were killed and over 270,000 lbs of poppy seed, 33 bags of opium, 13 bags of hashish, 50 barrels of precursory explosive material, 20 bolt-action rifles, 20 IED's, and 130,000 lbs of fertilizer, that could have been used for explosives charges, were seized.

=== Khan Neshin district ===
On July 2, 2009, approximately 500 Marines from 2nd LAR, 70-vehicle strong, arrived at Khanashin, the capital of Khan Neshin District. Khanashin had been a Taliban stronghold and coalition forces had never had a sustained presence in areas so deep into the southern Helmand River valley. The Marines halted outside the village, waiting for the village surgeon to give them permission. By the end of the day, the Marines were able to negotiate entry into the town, encountered no resistance, and began talks.

=== Marine attack on Dahaneh ===
On August 12, 2009, U.S. Marines mounted a helicopter assault on the Taliban-held town of Dahaneh, it had been under insurgent control for years. The assault began before dawn, the first assault wave in Humvees and MRAPs left a Marine base at 1:00 a.m. in the town of Naw Zad, about five miles north of Dahaneh. Three CH-53E Super Stallion helicopters then picked up a platoon of Marines and dropped them behind Taliban lines in Dahaneh. These troops blasted their way into a suspected militant compound, where they arrested five men and took over the compound as a base. U.S. Marine AV-8B Harrier II jets were also involved in the battle dropping flares in a show of force. As dawn broke, insurgent rocket and mortar fire started raining down on U.S. troops. Marines entered the town as others battled militants in the surrounding mountains. The first wave of Marines was met with small arms, mortar and rocket propelled grenade fire. Insurgents were firing from house rooftops and courtyards. A heavy machine gun the Taliban was firing from one of the streets slowed the Marines' progress into the town. Militants also brought in a truck to fire heavy missiles. After militants fired volleys of rockets from a mud-wall compound, the Marines called in a missile strike which destroyed the building and killed 7–10 militants inside, according to the Marines. By sunset, the Marines had made little progress into Dahaneh beyond the gains of the initial pre-dawn assault. Since the Marines encountered stiff resistance they suspected that the Taliban knew of the attack on the town and prepared themselves. Marine forces seized about 66 pounds of opium on the first day of the battle.

The second day of the fighting, Marine AH-1W SuperCobra attack helicopters fired rockets at Taliban positions in the nearby mountains where militants were believed firing at troops in the town. Later, U.S. A-10 Thunderbolt II attack aircraft fired multiple rounds into the cliffs overlooking what the Marines call "Hell's Pass", the entrance into the Now Zad valley, and U.S. surface-to-surface missiles, fired from the main Marine base, pounded the hillsides. Meanwhile, in the town, Marines came under heavy machine gun fire as they moved through the streets and alleyways. One Marine was killed. By the evening of the second day, Marine and Afghan troops had managed to take about half the town, however resistance was still continuing.

On the third day, Marines launched a pre-dawn raid against a Taliban position on the southern edge of the town, storming a fortified compound and then blowing up two towers from which insurgents fired rockets and mortars at U.S. troops the day before. Marines found marijuana plants growing in the courtyard and confiscated trigger plates used to manufacture roadside bombs.

By the fourth day the battle had ended and coalition troops secured the town.

== Aftermath ==
=== Pakistani concerns ===
On July 3, 2009, Prime Minister Yousaf Raza Gillani of Pakistan said that he was concerned with the influx of volatile strategic assets fleeing from Afghanistan into Pakistan due to the ongoing operation in Helmand, and this needs to be stopped. He urged this to a French delegation.

The Pakistani army moved troops from elsewhere on its side of the Afghan border to the stretch opposite Helmand to try to stop any militants from fleeing the offensive. Both U.S. and Pakistani officials have expressed concern that stepped-up operations in southern Afghanistan could push the insurgents across the border.

=== Effectiveness ===
On July 7, 2009, Afghan defense officials said that Taliban fighters and their commanders had escaped the big U.S. offensive in Helmand province and simply moved into areas to the west and north, prompting fears that the U.S. effort had just moved the Taliban problem elsewhere.

Gen. Zahir Azami, speaking for the Afghan Ministry of Defense, said that since the U.S. Marines began their offensive, Taliban fighters have moved to northern Helmand province near Baghran, an area controlled by German forces, and to the eastern edge of Farah province, largely under Italy's control.

Brig. Gen. Mahaiddin Ghori, the Afghan army commander in Helmand, estimated that Helmand province had roughly 500 foreign Taliban fighters and another 1,000 Afghan Taliban. Gen. Zahir Azami had no estimates of how many had moved north and west.

U.S. and NATO officials acknowledged that the Taliban moved from Helmand ahead of the Marines, and U.S. officials privately said they had seen less fighting during the one-week offensive than they had anticipated. General Ghori lamented the tightening of the RoE allowing up to two companies of Taliban to escape the clutches of the allied forces.

The shift of the Taliban into the areas to the west and north prompted complaints from German and Italian commanders, whose troops sheltered there. This prompted questions about whether the United States had enough troops to pursue the insurgents while at the same time carrying out Army Gen. Stanley McChrystal's plan to "clear, hold and build" areas taken from Taliban control, whilst simultaneously supporting the northern and western areas held by German and Italian forces.

=== Casualties ===
During the operation 14 U.S. Marines were killed. Two Afghan soldiers and one Afghan interpreter working with the Marines were also killed.

The U.S. does not officially count the enemy dead so it is almost impossible to get an accurate number of the Taliban who died in the operation. However, based on a few reports released, it can be concluded between July 2 and 4 also August 12 and 15 at least 49–62 Taliban were killed. This also, however, is most likely a minimum since there is no official enemy dead count throughout the whole operation and the Taliban have a tendency to bury their dead quickly, according to their religion, which makes it hard to get an accurate number of killed.

== Participating units ==
=== International Security Assistance Force ===
- Afghan forces

Unknown (probably includes elements of 3rd Brigade, 205th Corps which is the Helmand ANA garrison).

- British forces

Operation Herrick

- U.S. forces

Task Force Leatherneck

Regimental Combat Team 3

1st Battalion, 5th Marines
2nd Battalion, 8th Marines
3rd Battalion, 11th Marines

2nd Light Armored Reconnaissance Battalion (-)
2nd Marine Logistics Group
Marine Aircraft Group 40
Combat Aviation Brigade, 82nd Airborne Division (Task Force Pegasus)

3rd Battalion, 82nd Combat Aviation Brigade (Task Force Talon)

=== Taliban forces ===
- Several operational and IED making cells of about 4–10 personnel each influenced by a Taliban shadow government. Quetta Shura located in Pakistan provided top Taliban leadership for Helmand province.

== See also ==
- Operation Panther's Claw – simultaneous British operation in southern Afghanistan
- Helmand Province campaign – Coalition campaign to secure the province
- Battle of Now Zad – Operation by US Marines to secure Nawzad
- War in Afghanistan (2001–2021)
- Civilian casualties of the War in Afghanistan (2001–2021)
