= Helmand Province =

Largest province of Afghanistan

Helmand هلمند
- Province
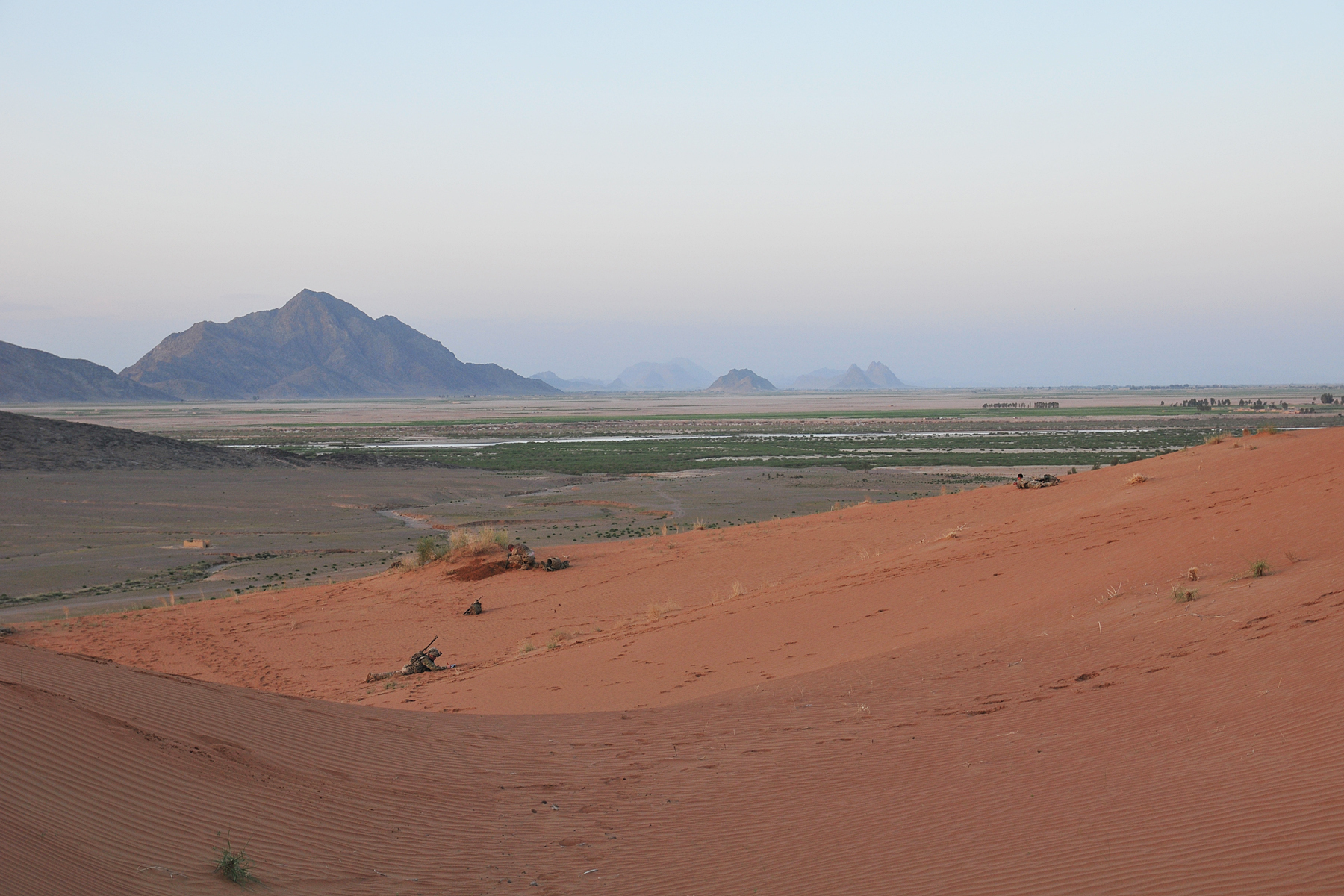
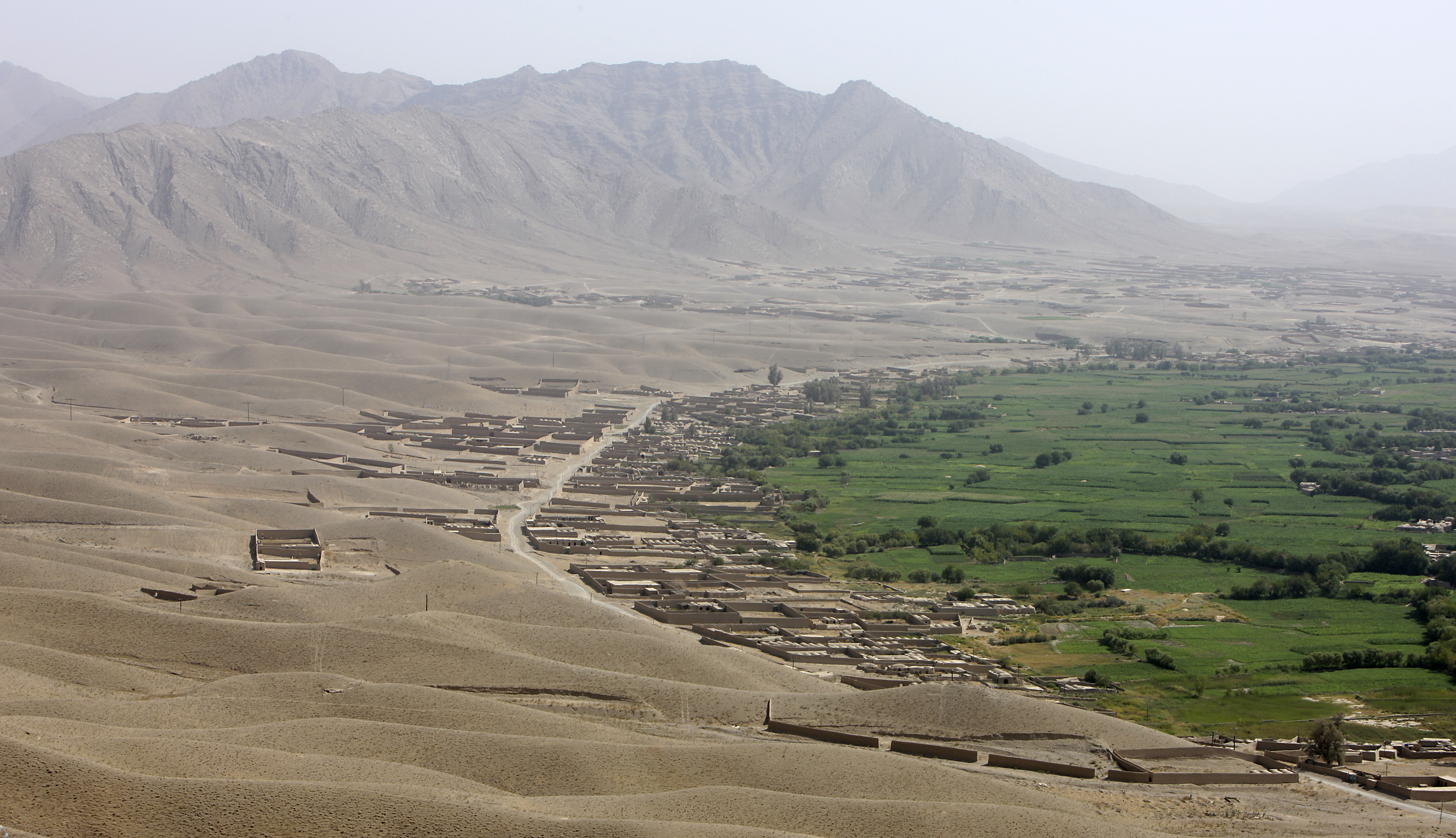
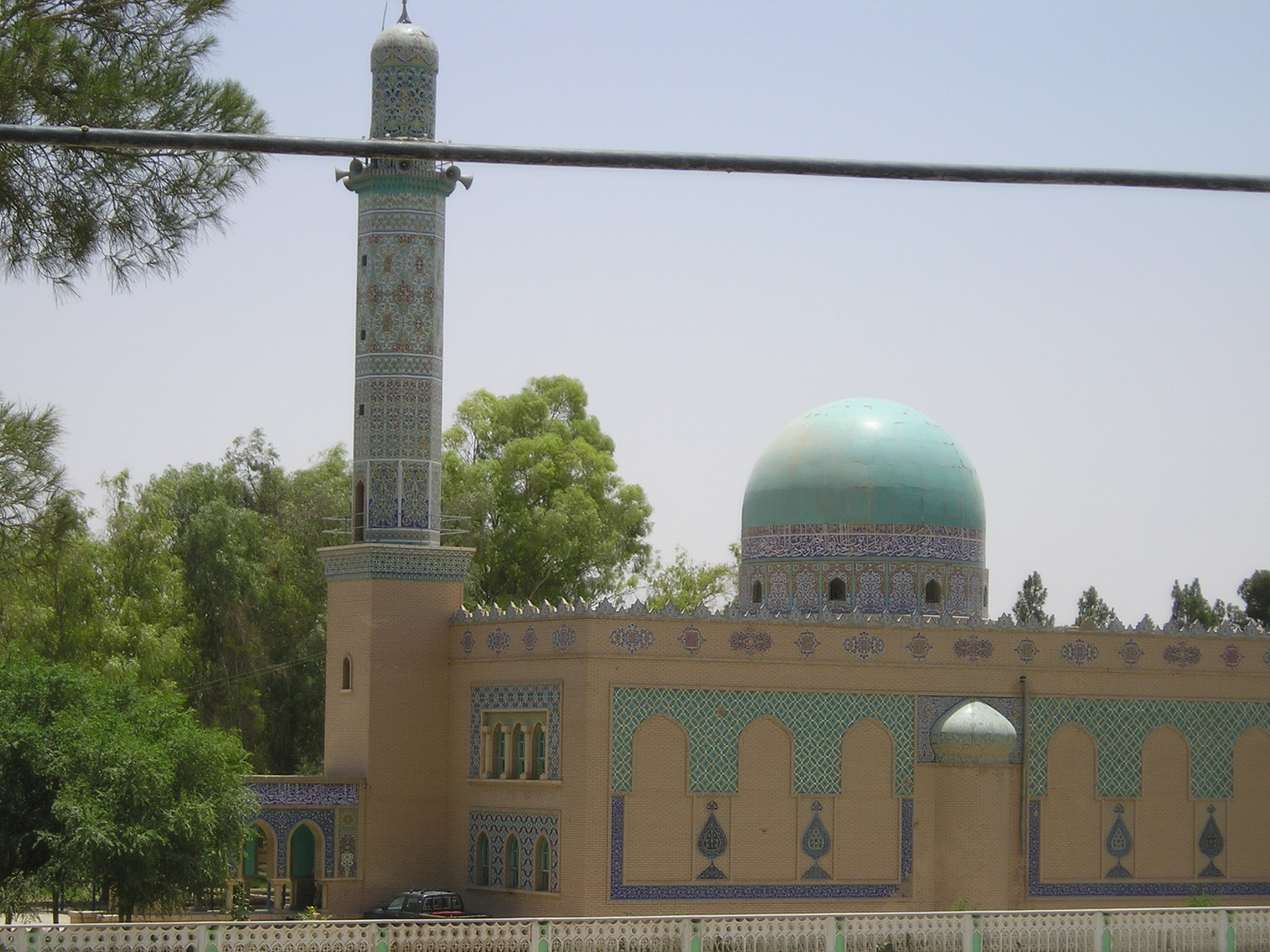
- From the top, Reg District, Sangin Valley, Lashkargah Mosque.

- Map of Afghanistan with Helmand highlighted
- Coordinates (Capital): 31.0°N 64.0°E
- Country: Afghanistan
- Capital: Lashkargah

Government
  - Governor: Abdul Rahman Kunduzi
  - Deputy Governor: Mulavi Hizbullah

Area
  - Total: 58,584 km^{2} (22,619 sq mi)

Population (2021)
  - Total: 1,472,162
  - Density: 25.129/km^{2} (65.084/sq mi)
- Time zone: UTC+4:30 (Afghanistan Time)
- Postal code: 39xx
- ISO 3166 code: AF-HEL
- Main languages: Pashto

Helmand (Note: /ˈhɛlmənd/, HEL-mənd) (Pashto (Note: Pashto pronunciation: [hilˈmand̪] or [ʔilˈmand̪]) and Dari: (Note: Dari pronunciation: [hɪlˈmand̪] or [ʔɪlˈmand̪]) هلمند), known in ancient times as Hermand, Hirmand, and Hethumand, is one of the 34 provinces of Afghanistan, in the south of the country. It is the largest province by area, covering 58,584 square kilometres (20,000 sq mi) area. The province contains 18 districts, encompassing over 1,000 villages, and roughly 1,446,230 settled people. Lashkargah serves as the provincial capital. Helmand was part of the Greater Kandahar region until made into a separate province by the Afghan government in the 20th century. It is largely populated by Pashtuns.

The Helmand River flows through the mainly desert region of the province, providing water used for irrigation. The Kajaki Dam, which is one of Afghanistan's major reservoirs, is located in the Kajaki district. Helmand is believed to be one of the world's largest opium producing regions, responsible for around 42% of the world's total production. This is believed to be more than the whole of Myanmar, which is the second-largest producing nation after Afghanistan. The region also produces tobacco, sugar beets, cotton, sesame, wheat, mung beans, maize, nuts, sunflowers, onions, potato, tomato, cauliflower, peanut, apricot, grape, and melon. The province has a domestic airport (Bost Airport), in the city of Lashkargah that was heavily used by NATO-led forces. The former British Camp Bastion and the U.S. Camp Leatherneck is a short distance southwest of Lashkargah.

Throughout the 2001–2021 war in Afghanistan, Helmand was a hotbed of insurgent activities and was often considered at the time to be Afghanistan's "most dangerous" province. The province also witnessed some of the heaviest fighting during the war, where at its peak hundreds of civilians were being killed monthly. Additionally, Helmand is considered to be one of Afghanistan's most socially conservative areas.

== History ==
=== Helmand culture ===
Helmand culture of western Afghanistan was a Bronze Age culture of the 3rd millennium BC. It is exemplified by such major sites as Shahr-i Sokhta, Mundigak, and Bampur.

The term "Helmand civilization" was proposed by M. Tosi. This civilization flourished between 2500 BC and 1900 BC and may have coincided with the great flourishing of the Indus Valley Civilisation. This was also the final phase of Periods III and IV of Shahr-i Sokhta, and the last part of Mundigak Period IV.

According to Jarrige et al.,

... the pottery of Mundigak I, the earliest occupation of the complex, corresponds to the Mehrgarh III pottery, in technique — the quality of the paste and manufacture — as well as in the shapes and decoration, probably within a phase dated to the end of the 5th millennium [BC]."

There were also links between Shahr-i Sokhta I, II, and III periods, and Mundigak III and IV periods, and between the sites of Balochistan and the Indus valley at the end of the 4th millennium, as well as in the first half of the 3rd millennium BC.

The Jiroft culture is closely related to the Helmand culture. The Jiroft culture flourished in eastern Iran, and the Helmand culture in western Afghanistan at the same time. They may represent the same cultural area. The Mehrgarh culture, on the other hand, is far earlier.

=== Achaemenid times ===
Helmand was inhabited by ancient peoples and governed by the Medes before falling to the Achaemenids.

Later, the area was part of the ancient Arachosia polity, and a frequent target for conquest because of its strategic location in Asia, which connects Southern, Central and Southwest Asia.

The Helmand river valley is mentioned by name in the Avesta (Fargard 1:13) as Haetumant, one of the early centers or origins of the Zoroastrian faith, in pre-Islamic Afghan history. However, there was also a presence of non-Zoroastrians when Zoroastrians were dominant before the Islamization of Afghanistan – particularly Buddhists.

Some Vedic scholars (e.g. Kochhar 1999) also believe the Helmand river corresponds to the Sarasvati river mentioned in the Rig Veda as the homeland of the Aryan tribes before migrating into the Indian subcontinent, ca. 1500 BC.

=== Alexander the Great to modern times ===
It was invaded in 330 BC by Alexander the Great and became part of the Seleucid Empire. Later, it came under the rule of the Mauryan emperor Ashoka, who erected a pillar there with a bilingual inscription in Greek and Aramaic. The territory was referred to as part of Zabulistan and ruled by the sun-worshipping Zunbils before the Muslim Arabs arrived in the 7th century, who were led by Abdur Rahman bin Samara. It later fell to the Saffarids of Zaranj and saw the first Muslim rule. Mahmud of Ghazni made it part of the Ghaznavids in the 10th century, who were replaced by the Ghurids.

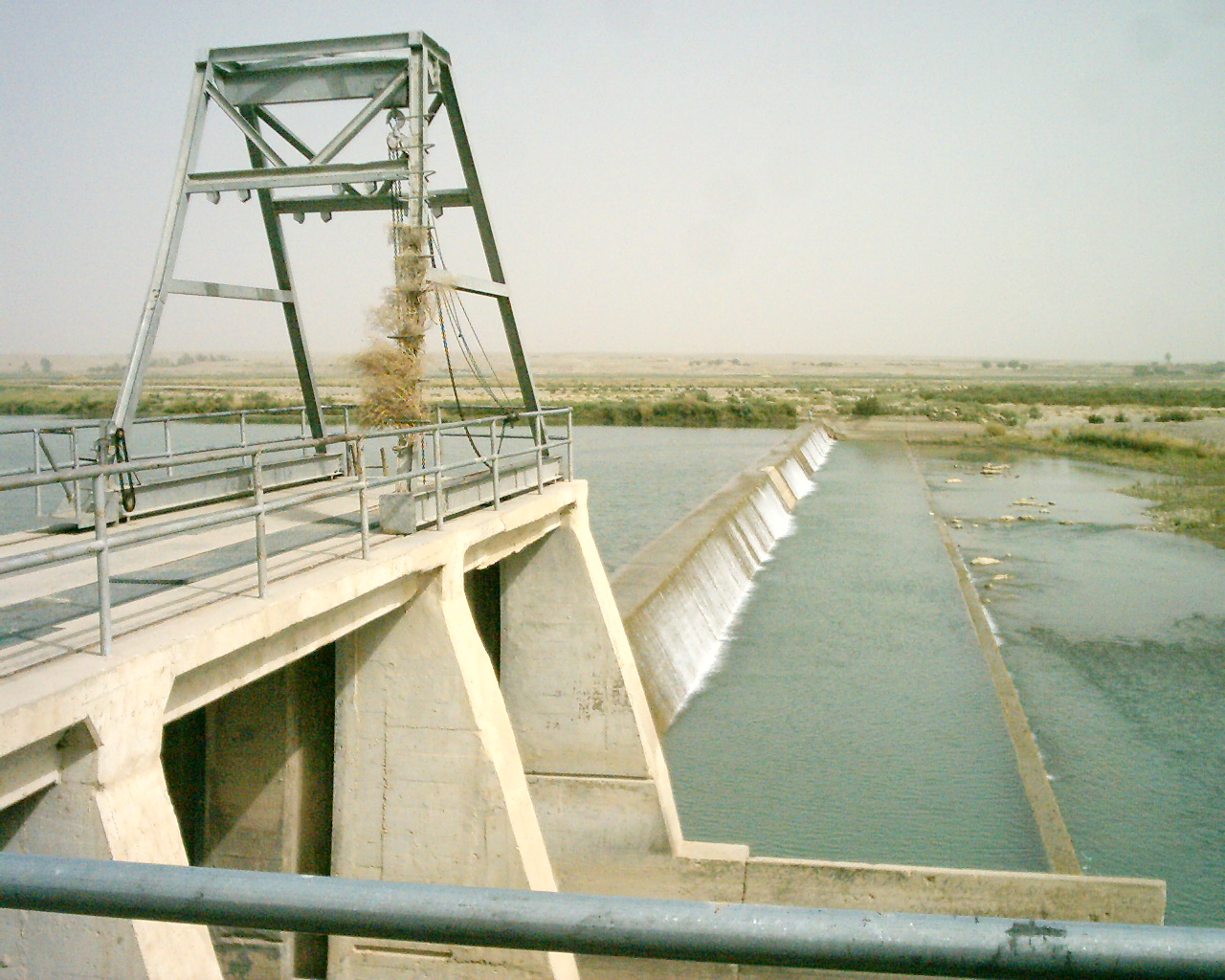
Grishk Dam, built by the United States around the 1960s.

After the destructions caused by Genghis Khan and his Mongol army in the 13th century, the Timurids established rule and began rebuilding Afghan cities. From about 1383 until his death in 1407, it was governed by Pir Muhammad, a grandson of Timur. By the early 16th century, it fell to Babur. However, the area was often contested by the Shia Safavids and Sunni Mughals until the rise of Mir Wais Hotak in 1709. He defeated the Safavids and established the Hotaki dynasty. The Hotakis ruled it until 1738 when the Afsharids defeated Shah Hussain Hotaki at what is now Old Kandahar.

=== Durrani era ===
When Ahmad Shah Durrani came to power in 1747, after Nader Shah was assassinated, he began redistributing land grants that had been given by his predecessor. At that time, the area of what is now Helmand province was part of Kandahar Province (which continued until it was split off into the new Farah Province during the reign of Sher Ali Khan), and it was known as Pusht-e Rud, or "across the river", reflecting how the region was viewed from Kandahar, which was Ahmad Shah's capital. Pusht-e Rud traditionally consisted into four districts: Zamindawar, Now Zad, Pusht-e Rud proper, and Garmsir. Ahmad Shah's land redistribution legitimized existing Alizai influence in Zamindawar, while the powerful Barakzai received Pusht-e Rud proper, and the district of Garmsir in the south was granted to the Noorzai to protect against Baluch raids. Now Zad was divided between the Noorzai and the Ishaqzai. This arrangement has survived, with a few exceptions, until the present day.

Then, as now, relatively few members of the Popolzai tribe (to which Ahmad Shah Durrani belonged) lived in Helmand. The Durrani monarchs were thus ambivalent towards the area's tribes and didn't favor any one tribe over the others. Rather, they treated the tribes according to their relative power. Thus, the powerful Barakzai tribe received a hereditary position as ministers to the crown, as well as some of the most valuable land in Helmand: the alluvial plains around present-day Malgir, Babaji, and Spin Masjid, as well as the strategically important Gereshk.

That changed in 1826, when Dost Mohammad Khan, himself a Barakzai, seized power. Dost Mohammad increased taxes on non-Barakzai tribes in Helmand, especially the Alizai of Zamindawar. When the Alizai didn't pay taxes, a Barakzai punitive expedition was sent to Zamindawar, and in Alizai clan chiefs were executed. During this period, the Alizai began to view the Barakzai as enemies, creating the Alizai-Barakzai dynamic that still heavily influences Helmand politics.

At this time, the area around Garmsir was effectively independent, and ignored by the monarchy in Kabul.

=== Anglo-Afghan Wars ===
In 1839, the British deposed Dost Mohammad Khan in favor of the Popolzai Shah Shuja Durrani. In doing so, they hoped to limit Russian influence in Afghanistan. Hoping to secure the loyalty of Helmandi tribal leaders, Shah Shujah reinstated the titles they had previously enjoyed under Popolzai rule, and he also held off on taxing them until his position was stronger. However, he kept the Barakzai tax collectors in office, and they resumed collection in 1840. When a Barakzai tax collector was killed at Sarwan Qala that year, the British sent in troops to enforce collection, a political blunder leading to open rebellion by the Alizai. It is not known if the British were aware of the political ramifications of Shah Shujah's decision to retain the Barakzai tax collectors, but they were completely bewildered by the ensuing rebellion, reflecting a clear lack of understanding of local dynamics on their part.

The leader of the rebellion was Aktur Khan, who had risen to prominence during this dispute. His invocations of Alizai honor and appeals to group identity had resulted in him attaining chieftainship of the Alizai. After some skirmishes, the British offered to remove the Barakzai tax collectors in return for the dispersal of Aktur Khan's 1,300 followers. This soon broke down, and by May 1841, Aktur Khan led a force of 3,000 men to capture Gereshk. The British retook Gereshk at the beginning of June and then led punitive expeditions into Zamindawar, and eventually the rebellion was defeated and Aktur Khan fled to Herat.

British-backed Barakzai horsemen were sent to reinforce Gereshk in November 1841. The Alizai repeatedly tried to capture it, but the Barakzai were able to maintain control until August 1842 because the other Barakzai who lived there kept them well-supplied.

Dost Mohammad Khan was reinstalled for a second reign when the British withdrew from Afghanistan, but he ran into financial difficulties and sought a subsidy from the British in 1857. He distributed money from this subsidy unevenly among Helmandi tribes, favoring the Barakzai over the others, which upset the balance of power between the tribes. The subsidy also divided Afghanistan into British and Russian spheres of influence, with Gereshk and the Helmand river being on the border between them, increasing the area's strategic importance. The subsidy ended in 1862 when Dost Mohammad died and a succession crisis broke out between his sons. Helmandis fought as mercenaries on the side of one of them, Sher Ali Khan, playing a role in his eventual victory. The deciding battle was fought at Gereshk in 1868.

Indebted to the Helmandi tribes for their contributions during the war, Sher Ali scaled back tax collection in the area and reduced the allowances to the Barakzai khans. Because of this, the Alizai did not rebel during his reign. Another key development for Helmand (Pusht-e Rud) during Sher Ali's reign was that he moved its four traditional districts into the newly created Farah Province, moving it out of Kandahar's sphere of influence and meaning that he could influence the Pusht-e Rud area without going through a relative in Kandahar.

In November 1878, the British invaded Afghanistan again. They occupied Gereshk until February 1879; an Alizai force of 1500 attacked them as they withdrew. Sher Ali died soon after, however, and the British wanted to again occupy Gereshk as a forward outpost against Sher Ali's son Ayub Khan. Perhaps realizing that the presence of their troops garrisoning Helmandi forts upset locals, the British sent a proxy Barakzai force to occupy Gereshk.

Ayub Khan found ample support from Helmandis in his subsequent campaign against the British: three or four thousand Alizai tribesmen, led by a man named Abu Bakr, had joined his army by October, as did a smaller contingent of Noorzai. Doubting the Barakzai's loyalty, the British sent some of their own troops to reinforce Gereshk in July 1880, led by George Burrows. The Barakzai promptly mutinied and went over to Ayub Khan's side — a rare Barakzai-Alizai alliance, joining against a common enemy. The British withdrew and Ayub Khan's army pursued, leading to a major Afghan victory at the Battle of Maiwand on 27 July. Having achieved their main goal of defeating the British, the Alizai then left and returned to Zamindawar.

The British later defeated Ayub Khan, but they ended up withdrawing from Afghanistan altogether, installing Abdur Rahman Khan as the new ruler and giving him a subsidy. Abdur Rahman Khan was a strong and intelligent state-builder who used the subsidy to finance a professional army. He defeated Abu Bakr of the Alizai and had him exiled, after which the Alizai cooperated with paying taxes. He used a combination of incentives and force to move the Ishaqzai and Noorzai to the northwestern part of Afghanistan, away from the lands along the Helmand they had been granted by Nader Shah. Their relocation was a disaster and many ended up returning to the Helmand area.

When they came back, however, they were only given scattered, less-productive lands. This dramatically changed the power dynamic of the Helmand area, marking the beginning of Ishaqzai and (to a lesser degree) Noorzai disenfranchisement from government that has continued into the 21st century. The Noorzai would occupy marginal lands until the late 20th century, and the Ishaqzai population remains dispersed and scattered throughout Helmand today.

The weakening of Helmand's non-Barakzai tribes, combined with a policy of non-interference with the tribes, led to stability in the region throughout Abdur Rahman's reign. This continued during the rule of his son Habibullah, who died in 1919.

=== 20th century development projects ===
An important development was the re-construction of the Nahr-e Saraj canal, beginning in 1910. Newly irrigated areas that had previously been desert were now populated with ethnic and tribal groups who were not originally from Helmand, including refugees from Central Asia fleeing Soviet rule. Many of the villages along the canal therefore are named after these groups, such as Uzbek, Turkmen, and Popolzai. The government had originally planned to continue developing the Helmand area during the 1920s, but ended up shelving that project due to unrest over Amanullah's social reforms. In 1936, after the Musahiban dynasty had come to power, the government began construction of another canal in Helmand, the Nahr-e Bughra. The Afghan government originally sought out US financial and technical assistance, but the US refused, so instead it was the Germans and Japanese who contributed. The Nahr-e Bughra project employed up to 7,000 workers, and there were also other small-scale development projects in the area at the same time. Roads, bridges, and telephone wires were built to connect the major settlements. This was the first externally supervised development project in Helmand. However, when World War II broke out, the British requested that the German and Japanese engineers be expelled from Afghanistan, and the government had to continue on its own.

Helmand was the center of the USAID program in the 1960s to develop the Helmand and Arghandab Valley Authority (HAVA) – it became known locally as "little America". The program laid out tree-lined streets in Lashkargah, built a network of irrigation canals and constructed a large hydroelectric dam. The development program was abandoned when pro-Soviet Union forces seized power in 1978, although much of the province is still irrigated by the HAVA.

=== Administrative changes ===
Thanks in part to the irrigation projects, the Pusht-e Rud area had become more important to the government. Between 1957 and 1960, the province of Girishk was carved out of the western parts of the province of Kandahar. The new provincial capital was named after the city of Girishk, reflecting the historical role of the Barakzai, whose local dominance had been diluted by the influx of outside settlers. The choice was short-lived, however, since the United States, whose HVA headquarters was based in Lashkar Gah, successfully pressured the Afghan government to relocate the capital there. By 1964, the provincial capital had shifted to Lashkar Gah, and the province was renamed Helmand. For the first time since 1826, the Helmandi Barakzai were no longer dominant in the region. The government responded with a sweeping reorganisation of the province's district boundaries, abolishing the four traditional districts and replacing them with a larger number of new ones, each assigned an "order" that determined resource allocation. The reorganisation served two overlapping purposes: to compensate the Barakzai for their loss of the provincial capital, and to position the government favourably ahead of the elections introduced by the 1964 constitution.

The two goals were most visible in the treatment of the former Barakzai heartland. The old district of Pusht-e Rud, or Girishk, was divided into Nahr-e Seraj, elevated to the only 1st-order district in the province, alongside Nawa (4th order) and the new capital district of Lashkar Gah. The capital district itself was gerrymandered to give the Barakzai a majority: Barakzai-dominated Babaji was folded in, and the boundary with Nad Ali was drawn along the edge of Barakzai territory in Bolan. Through these adjustments, the Barakzai retained effective control over the new provincial capital even as they lost its symbolic status.

Elsewhere, the reorganisation followed a more straightforward logic. The Alizai district of Zamindawar was broken into Musa Qala (2nd order), Baghran (4th order), and Kajaki (sub-district). Nawzad, with its mixed Noorzai and Ishaqzai population, was divided into Nawzad (2nd order) and Washir (sub-district). Garmsir district was the only traditional district left intact, receiving 3rd-order status. The diverse settler population of Nad Ali and Marjah, drawn from 37 different tribes and ethnicities, was consolidated into a single 3rd-order district. The one exception to the pattern was Sangin, created as a sub-district specifically to separate the Alikozai, who are closely related to the Barakzai, from the Alizai.

=== 21st century ===
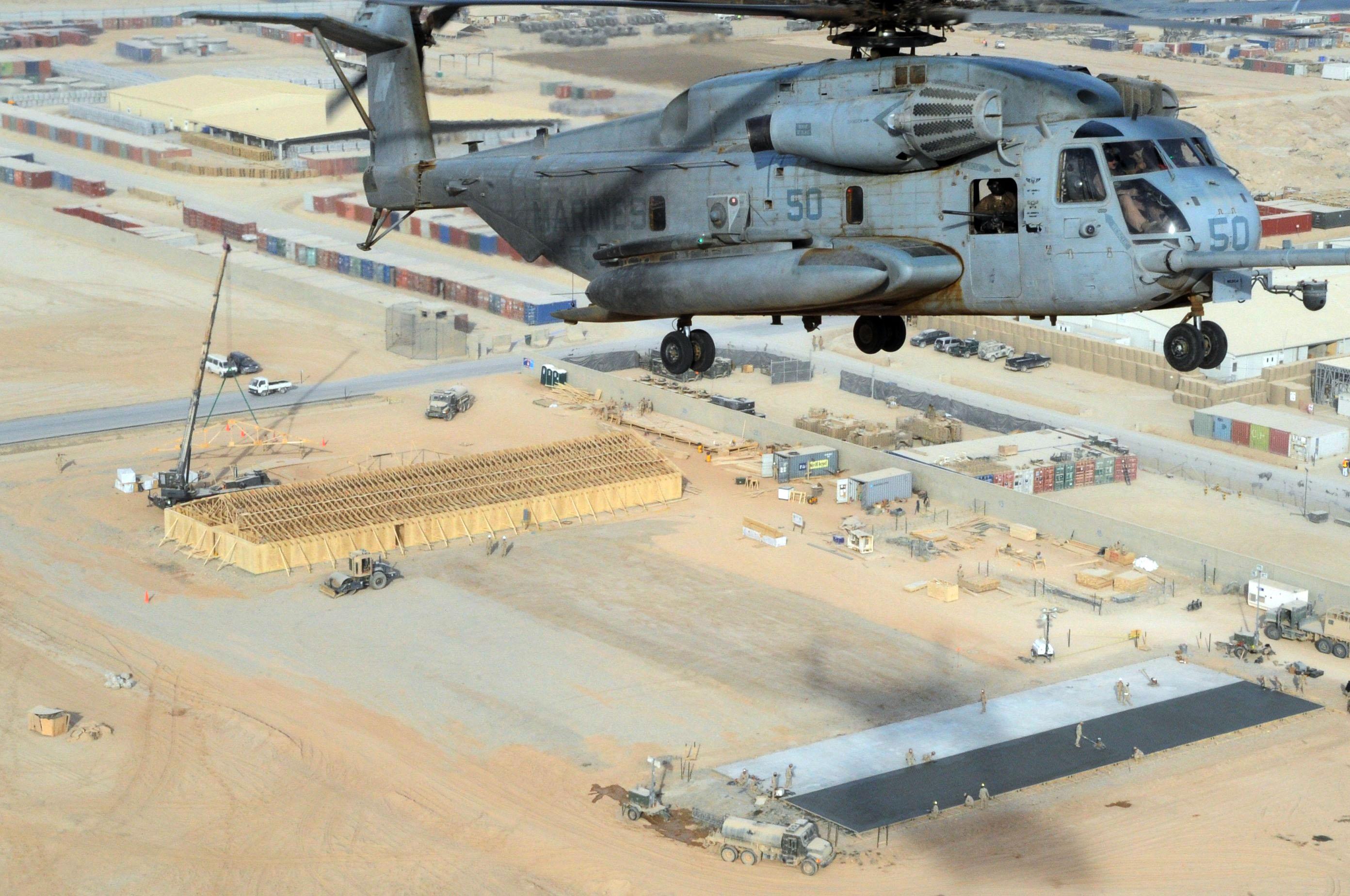
Camp Leatherneck

During Operation Enduring Freedom, the United States Agency for International Development program contributed to a counter-narcotics initiative called the Alternative Livelihoods Program (ALP) in the province. It paid communities to work to improve their environment and economic infrastructure as an alternative to opium poppy farming. The project undertook drainage and canal rehabilitation projects. In 2005 and 2006, there were problems in getting promised finance to communities and this was a source of considerable tension between the farmers and the Coalition forces.

After it was decided to deploy British troops to the Province, PJHQ tasked 22 SAS to conduct a reconnaissance of the province. The review was led by Mark Carleton-Smith, who found the province largely at peace due to the brutal rule of Sher Mohammad Akhundzada, and a booming opium-fuelled economy that benefited the pro-government warlords. In June he reported back to the MoD warning them not to remove Akhundzada and against the deployment of a large British force which would likely cause conflict where none existed.

It was announced in January 2006 in the British Parliament that International Security Assistance Force (ISAF) would replace the U.S. troops in the province as part of Operation Herrick. The British 16 Air Assault Brigade would be the core of the force in Helmand Province. British bases were located in the districts of Sangin, Lashkargah and Grishk. British forces were replaced in Sangin by elements of the United States Marine Corps I Marine Expeditionary Force Forward.

In summer 2006, Helmand was one of the provinces involved in Operation Mountain Thrust, a combined NATO-Afghan mission targeted at Taliban fighters in the south of the country. In July 2006, this offensive mission essentially stalled in Helmand as NATO, primarily British, and Afghan troops were forced to take increasingly defensive positions under heavy insurgent pressure. In response, British troop levels in the province were increased, and new encampments were established in Sangin and Grishk. Fighting was particularly heavy in the districts of Sangin, Naway, Nawzad and Garmsir. There were reports that the Taliban saw Helmand province as a key testing area for their ability to take and hold Afghan territory from NATO-led Afghan National Security Forces. Commanders on the ground described the situation as the most brutal conflict the British Army had been involved in since the Korean War.

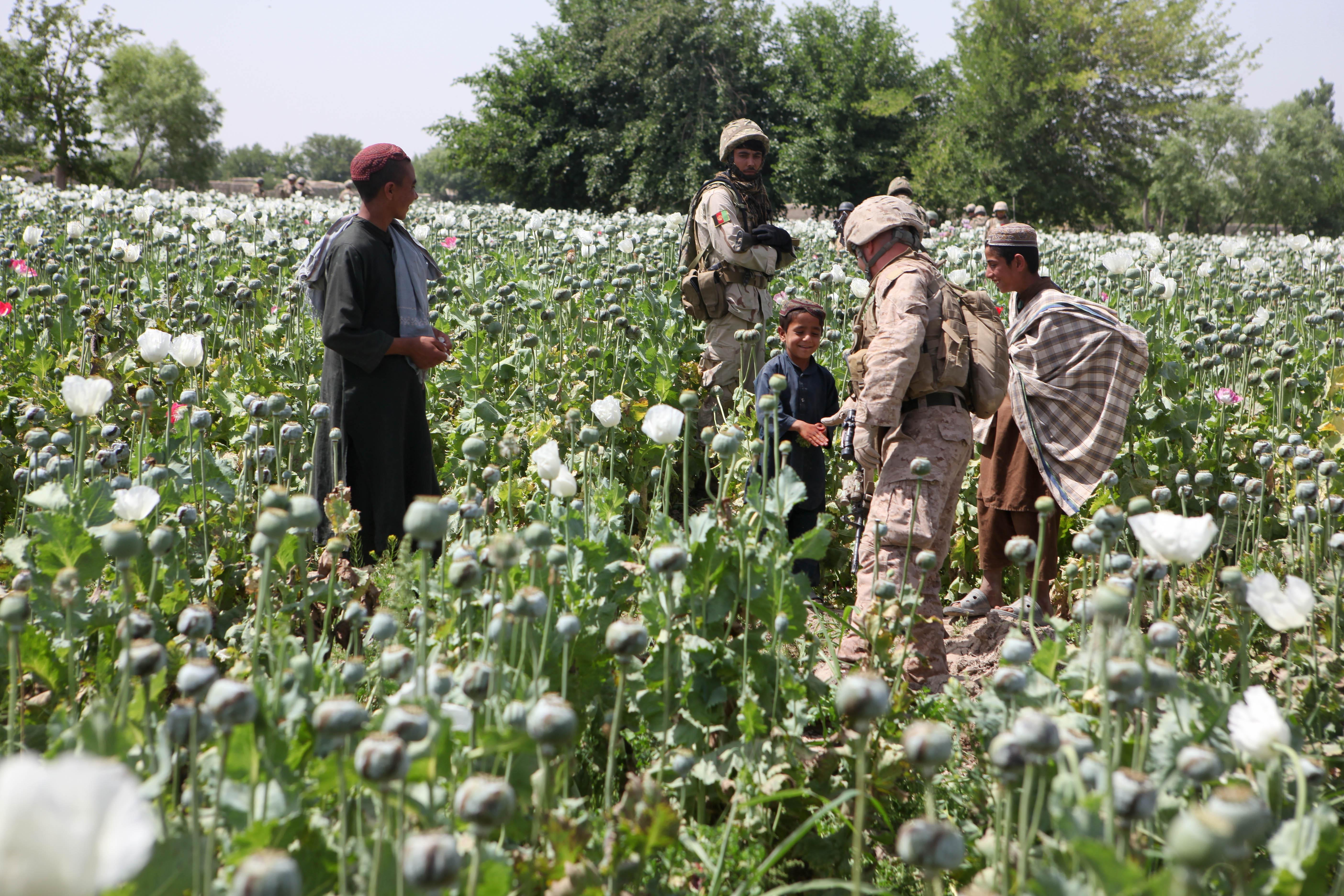
A U.S. Marine greeting local children working in an opium poppy field in 2011.

In Autumn 2006, British troops started to reach "cessation of hostilities" agreements with local Taliban forces around the district centers where they had been stationed earlier in the summer. Under the terms of the agreement, both sets of forces were to withdraw from the conflict zone. This agreement from the British forces implied that the strategy of holding key bases in the district, as requested by Afghan President Hamid Karzai, was essentially untenable with the levels of British troop deployment. The agreement was also a setback for Taliban fighters, who were desperate to consolidate their gains in the province, but were under heavy pressure from various NATO offensives.

News reports identified the insurgents involved in the fighting as a mix of Taliban fighters and warring tribal groups who are heavily involved in the province's lucrative opium trade. Given the amount of drugs produced in the area, it is likely that foreign drug traffickers were also involved.

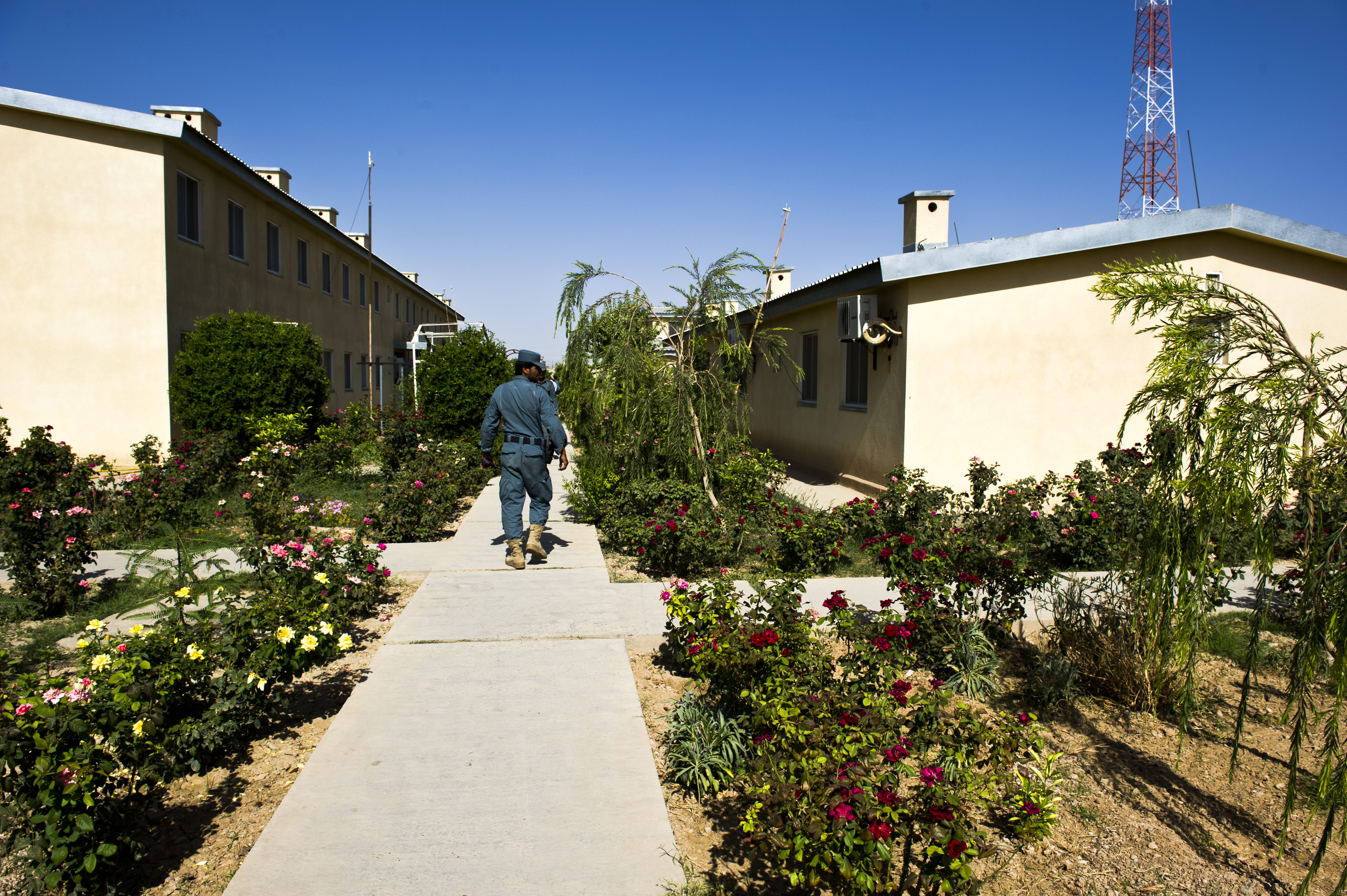
Afghan National Police station in Lashkargah.

Fighting continued throughout the winter, with British and allied troops taking a more pro-active stance against the Taliban insurgents. Several operations were launched including Operation Silicone at the start of spring. In May 2007, Mullah Dadullah, one of the Taliban's top commanders, along with 11 of his men were killed by NATO-led Afghan forces in Helmand.

In April 2008, about 1,500 2nd Battalion 7th Marines occupied over 300 square miles (800 km^{2}) of Helmand River valley and neighboring Farah Province. The operation was to set up forward operation bases and train the Afghan National Police in an area with little or no outside support.

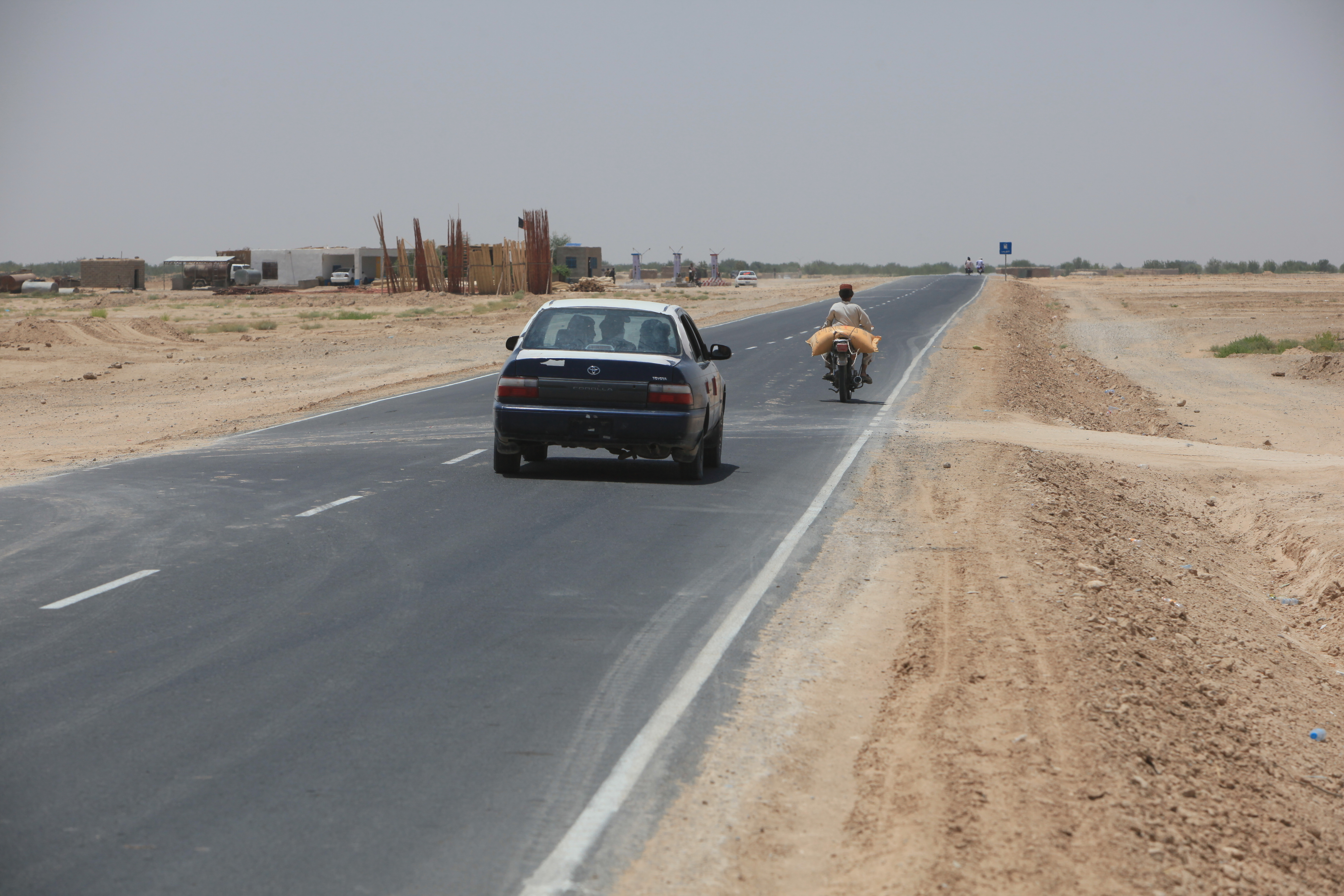
Locals drive on the new 12-kilometer road built by Afghans partnered with Marine and British engineer mentors. The new road was completed five months ahead of schedule and built entirely by Afghans.

Also in 2008, an Embedded Training Team from the Oregon Army National Guard led a Kandak of Afghan National Army troops in fighting against the Taliban in Lashkargah, as seen in the documentary Shepherds of Helmand.

In June 2009, Operation Panther's Claw was launched with the stated aim of securing control of various canal and river crossings and establishing a lasting ISAF presence in an area described by Lt. Col. Richardson as "one of the main Taliban strongholds" ahead of the 2009 Afghan presidential election.

In July 2009, around 4,000 U.S. marines pushed into the Helmand River valley in a major offensive to liberate the area from Taliban insurgents. The operation, dubbed Operation Khanjar (Operation Dagger), was the first major push since U.S. president Obama's request for 21,000 additional soldiers in Afghanistan, targeting the Taliban insurgents.

In February 2013, BBC reported that corruption occurs in Afghan National Police bases, with some bases arming children, using them as servants and sometimes sexually abusing them; in early March 2013, The New York Times reported that government corruption is rampant with routine accusations against the police of shaking down and sexually abusing civilians causing loyalty to the government to be weaker.

On 13 August 2021, the capital of the province Lashkar Gah fell to the Taliban after weeks of fighting in the Battle of Lashkargah. Around 1,500 Afghan soldiers were said to have surrendered, leaving the province in Taliban hands. According to The Washington Post, the US withdrawal and Taliban victory was mostly met with relief in Helmand; the province had suffered through some of the deadliest battles of the war from 2001 to 2021 and heavy US-led bombardments.

== Administrative divisions ==
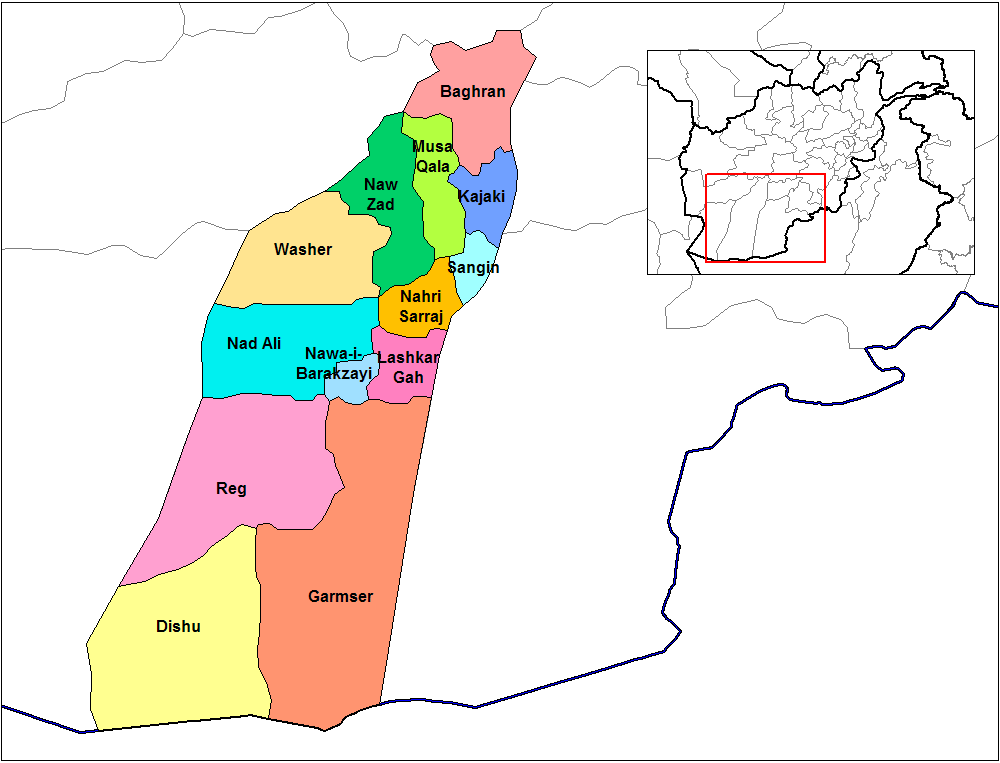
Map of the districts of Helmand as of January 2004, prior to the redrawing of provincial and district boundaries later that year

Districts of Helmand Province
| District | Capital | Population | Area in km^{2} | Pop. density | Number of villages and ethnic groups |
|---|---|---|---|---|---|
| Baghran | | 129,745 | 3,858 | 34 | 38 villages. 90% Pashtun, 10% Hazara. |
| Dishu | | 30,296 | 11,680 | 2 | 80% Pashtun, 20% Baloch |
| Garmsir | | 119,237 | 14,260 | 8 | 112 villages. 99% Pashtun, 1% Baloch. |
| Kajaki | | 116,827 | 2184 | 53 | 220 villages. 100% Pashtun. |
| Khanashin (Reg) | | 26,348 | 7,064 | 4 | 52% Pashtun, 48% Baloch. |
| Lashkargah | Lashkargah | 194,473 | 1,891 | 103 | 160 villages. 60% Pashtun, 20% Baloch, 20% Hindu, Hazara and Uzbek. |
| Marjah | Marjah | 30,425 | 2,904 | 10 | Used to belong to Nad Ali District. |
| Musa Qala | Musa Qala | 121,749 | 1,209 | 101 | 100% Pashtun. |
| Nad Ali | | 186,929 | 3,046 | 61 | 80% Pashtun, 10% Hazara, 5% Tajik, 5% Baloch. |
| Grishk (Nahri Saraj) | | 174,820 | 1,554 | 113 | 97 villages. 90% Pashtun, 5% Hazara, 5% Baloch. |
| Nawa-I-Barakzayi | | 111,259 | 617 | 180 | 350 villages. 99% Pashtun, 1% Farsiwan, Hindu and Sikh. |
| Nawzad | | 97,824 | 5,318 | 18 | 100% Pashtun. |
| Sangin | Sangin | 77,353 | 516 | 150 | 100% Pashtun. |
| Washir | | 28,945 | 4,647 | 6 | 100% Pashtun. |
| Helmand | | 1,446,230 | 58,305 | 25 | 88.1% Pashtuns, 5.4% Balochi, 3.9% Hazaras, 0.9% Hindus, 0.9% Uzbeks, 0.8% Farsiwans (Tajiks), <0.1% Sikhs. (Note: Note: "Predominantely" or "dominated" is interpreted as 99%, "majority" as 70%, "mixed" as 1/(number of ethnicities), "minority" as 30% and "few" or "some" as 1%.) |

== Economy ==
=== Agriculture ===
Farming is the main source of income for the majority. This includes agriculture and animal husbandry. Animals include cows, sheep, goats, and chicken. Donkeys and camels are used for labor. The province has a potential for fishery. The region produces the following: opium, tobacco, cotton, wheat and potato.

=== Transport ===
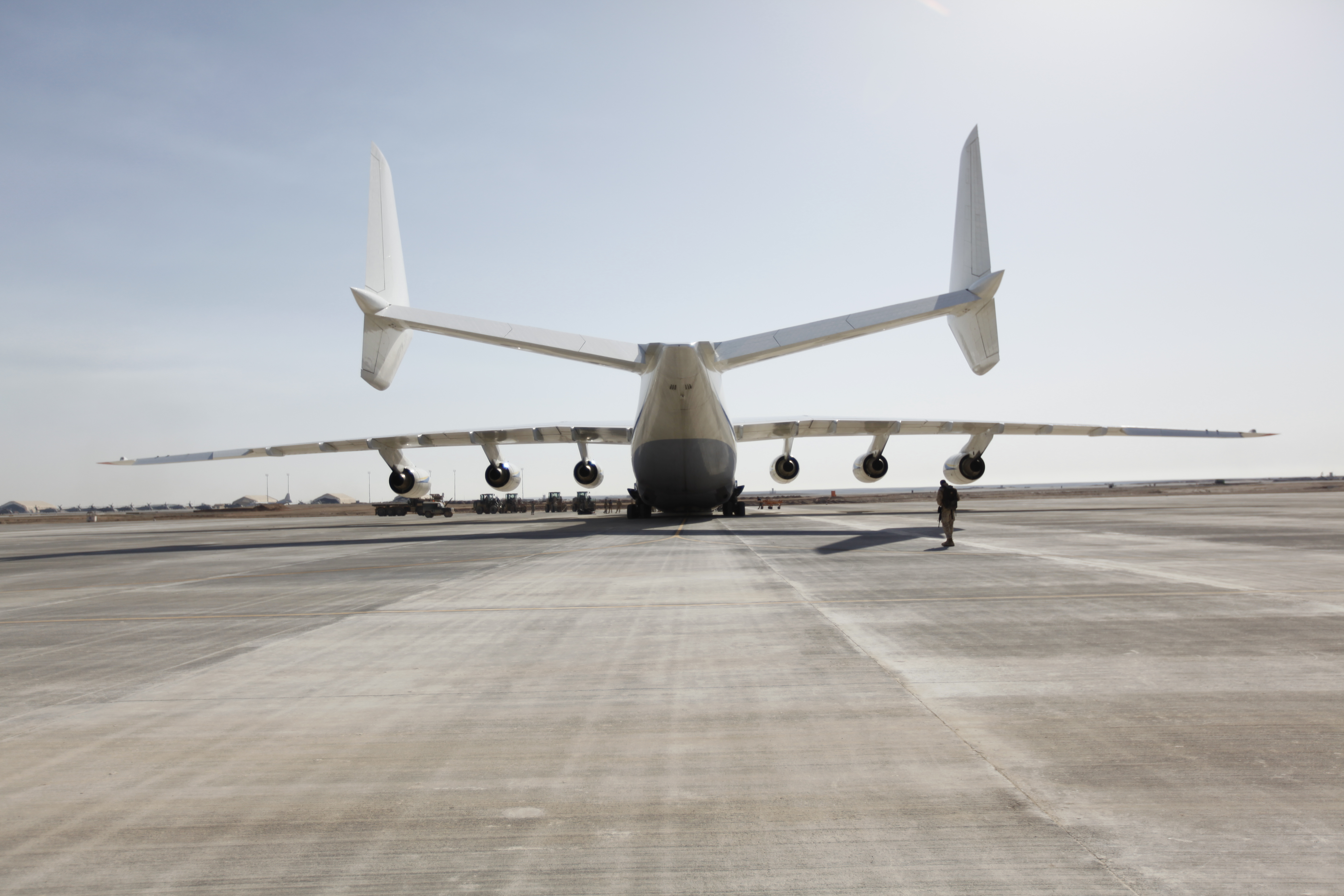
The Antonov An-225 Mriya at Camp Bastion

Bost Airport serves the population of Helmand for domestic flights to other parts of the country. It is designed for civilian use. NATO-led forces heavily used the airport at Camp Shorabak, formerly Camp Bastion. Camp Leatherneck, which used to be the main British base in Afghanistan during the occupation, is also adjacent. All sites were claimed by the Taliban on 13 August 2021.

There is no rail service. Primary roads include the ring road passes through Helmand from Kandahar to Delaram. There is a major north–south route (Highway 611) that goes from Lashkargah to Sangin. About 33% of Helmands roads are not passable during certain seasons and in some areas, there are no roads at all.

== Demographics ==
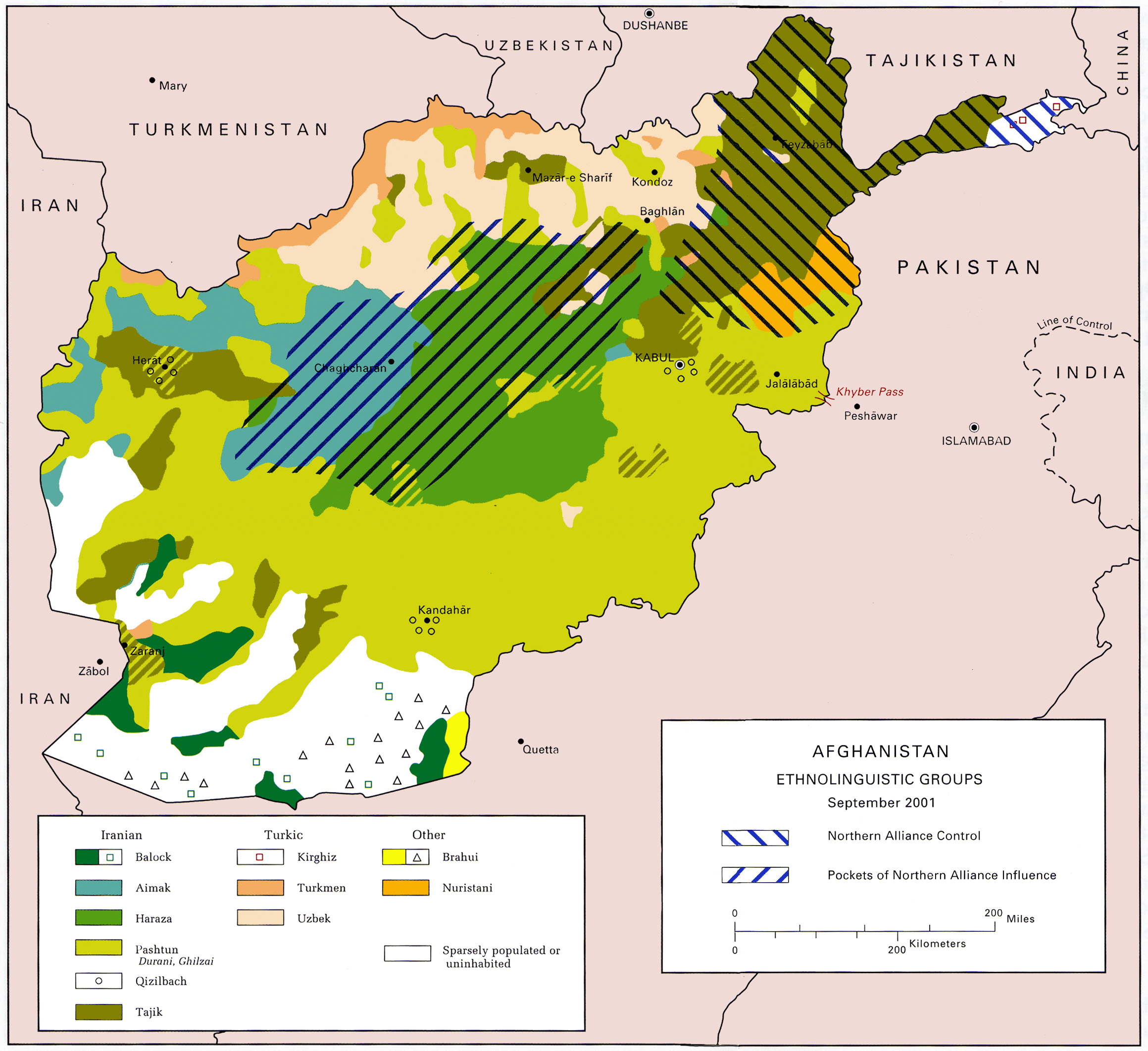
Ethnolinguistic groups of Afghanistan

=== Population ===
As of 2020, the population of Helmand Province is about 1,446,230.

=== Ethnicity, languages and religion ===
Helmand is mostly a tribal and rural society, with the ethnic Pashtuns being predominant; there is a significant Baloch minority in the south, and there is small minority of Tajiks, and a significant minority of Hazaras in the far northern regions of the province. The Pashtuns are divided into the following tribes: Barakzai (32%), Nurzai (16%), Alakozai (9%), and Eshaqzai (5.2%). All the inhabitants practice Sunni Islam except the small number of Hazaras who are Shi'as and the Sikhs who follow Sikhism. Of the population, 53.5% lived below the national poverty line.

Estimated ethnolinguistic and -religious composition
| Ethnicity | Pashtun | Baloch | Hazara | Tajik/ Farsiwan | Other | Sources |
| Period | Pashtun | Baloch | Hazara | Tajik/ Farsiwan | Other | Sources |

| 2004–2021 (Islamic Republic) | 92 – 95% | largest minority | 4% | | ∅ |
| 2020 EU | 1st | – | – | – | – |
| 2018 UN | overwhelming majority | substantial minority | ∅ | ∅ | ∅ (Note: incl. Sikh.) |
| 2017 CSSF (Note: Demographic information is based on data from 2017.) | predominant | minority | ∅ | ∅ | – |
| 2015 NPS | majority (Note: incl. "Nalaquin", usually meaning eastern Pashtun tribes.) | minority | – | – | – |
| 2015 CP | 92% | largest minority | 4% | | – |
| 2011 FIC | 95% | ∅ | ∅ | ∅ | ∅ (Note: incl. Sikh and Uzbek.) |
| 2011 PRT | 92% (Note: excl. Kochi.) | significant minority | – | – | – |
| 2011 USA | 92% | ∅ | – | – | – |
| 2009 ISW | majority | ∅ | ∅ | ∅ | – |

Legend:
- ∅: Ethnicity mentioned in source but not quantified
- –: Ethnicity not mentioned specifically
- Source abbreviations: Empirical sources: –, Government sources: CP – Colombo Plan, EU – European Union Agency for Asylum, PRT – Provincial Reconstruction Team of the United States government, UN – United Nations Assistance Mission in Afghanistan, Editorial sources: FIC – Feinstein International Center, CSSF – Center for the Scientific Study of Families, USA – United States Army

=== Education ===
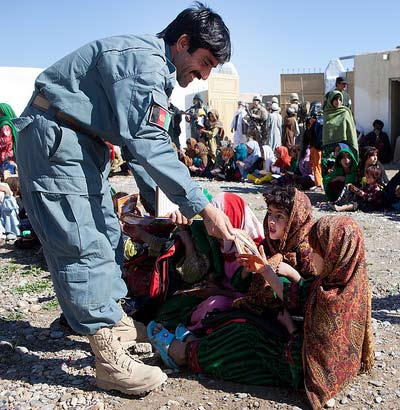
An Afghan police officer giving a book to schoolgirls during the opening of a new girls' school in Helmand

The overall literacy rate (6+ years of age) increased from 5% in 2005 to 12% in 2011. The overall net enrollment rate (6–13 years of age) fell from 6% in 2005 to 4% in 2011.

=== Health ===
The percentage of households with clean drinking water fell from 28% in 2005 to 3% in 2011. The percentage of births attended to by a skilled birth attendant increased from 2% in 2005 to 3% in 2011.

== Culture ==
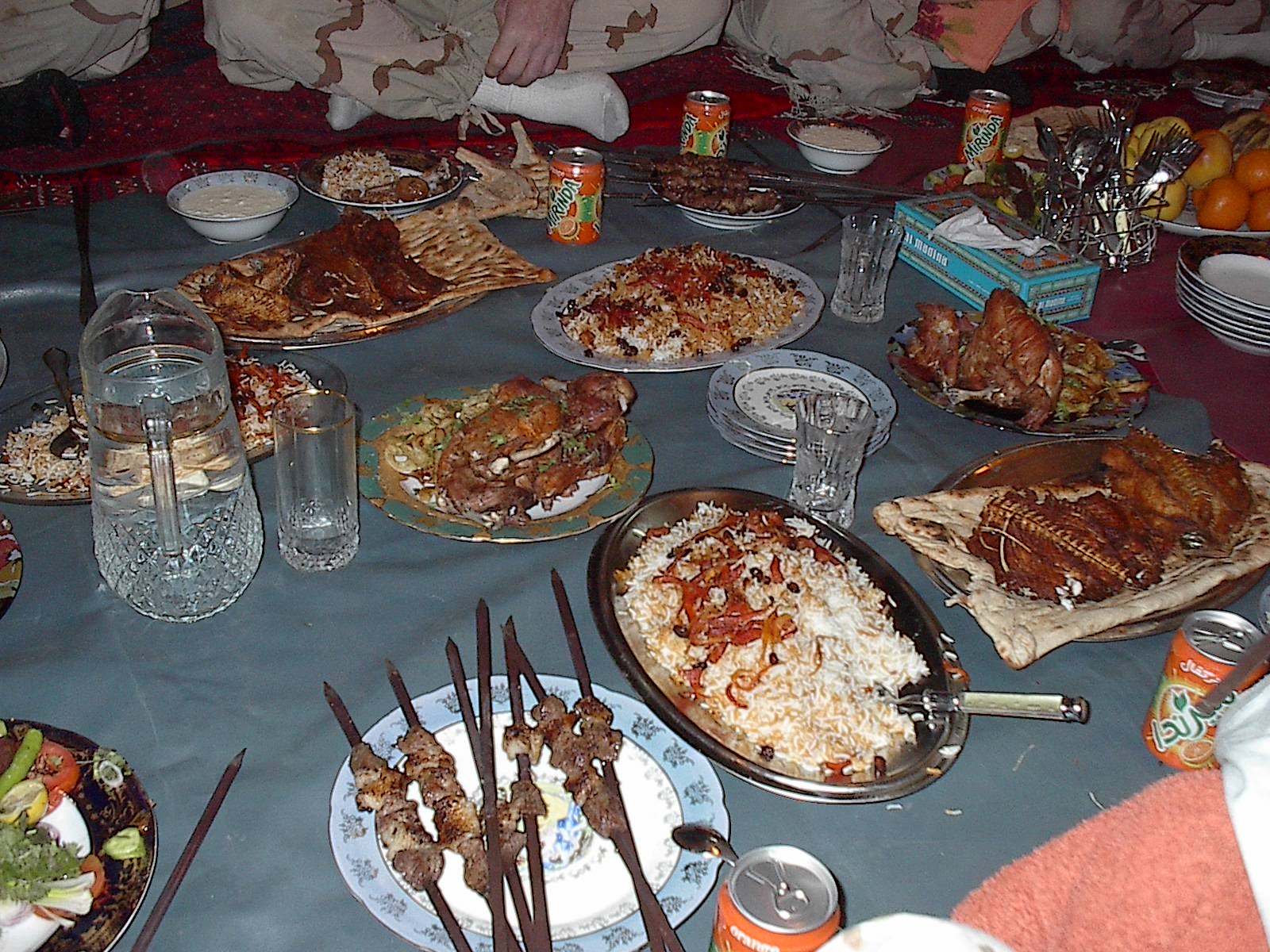
Traditional Afghan food on a dastarkhan in Helmand

== Gallery ==
Images of Helmand Province

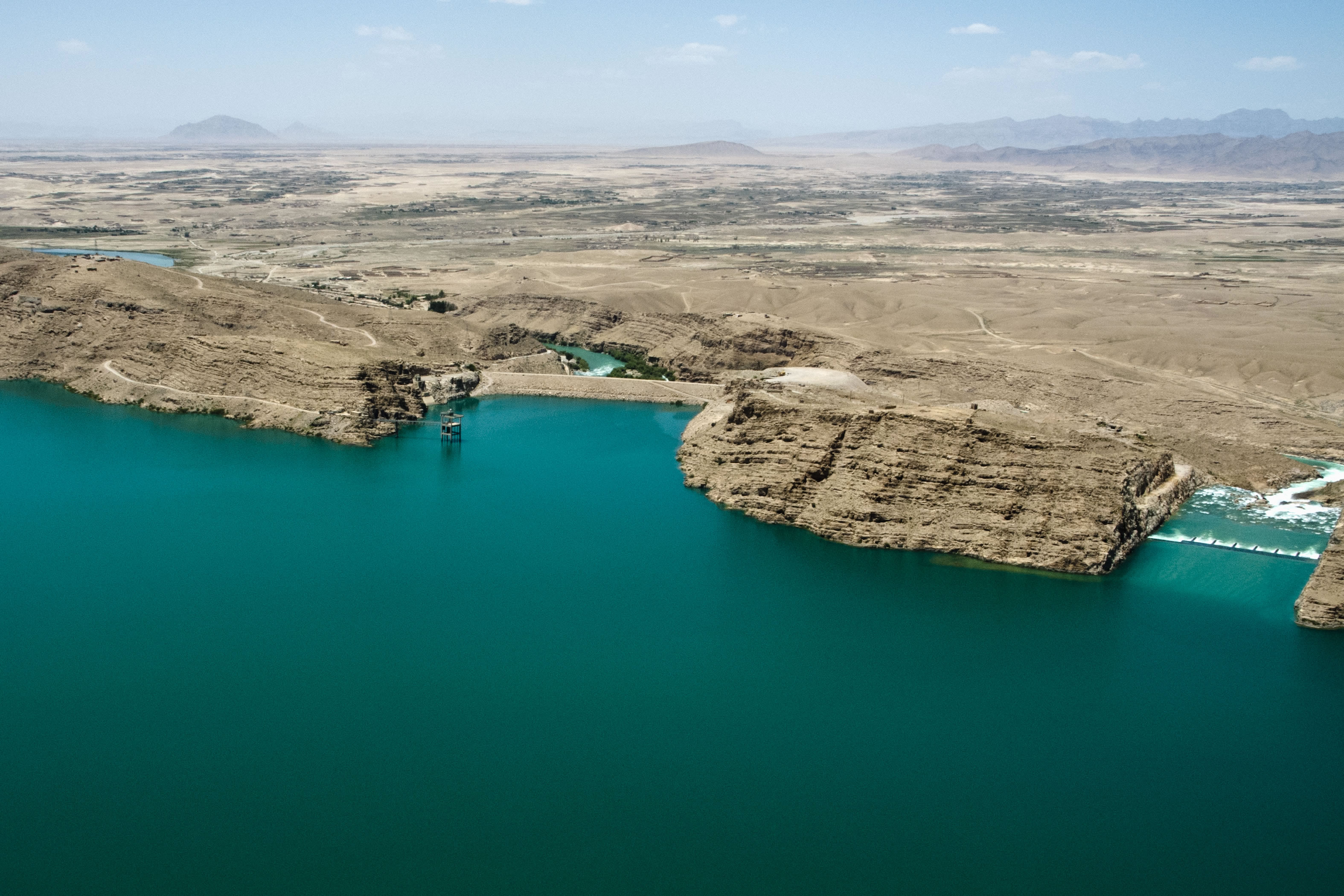
The Kajaki Dam (left) and spillway (right)

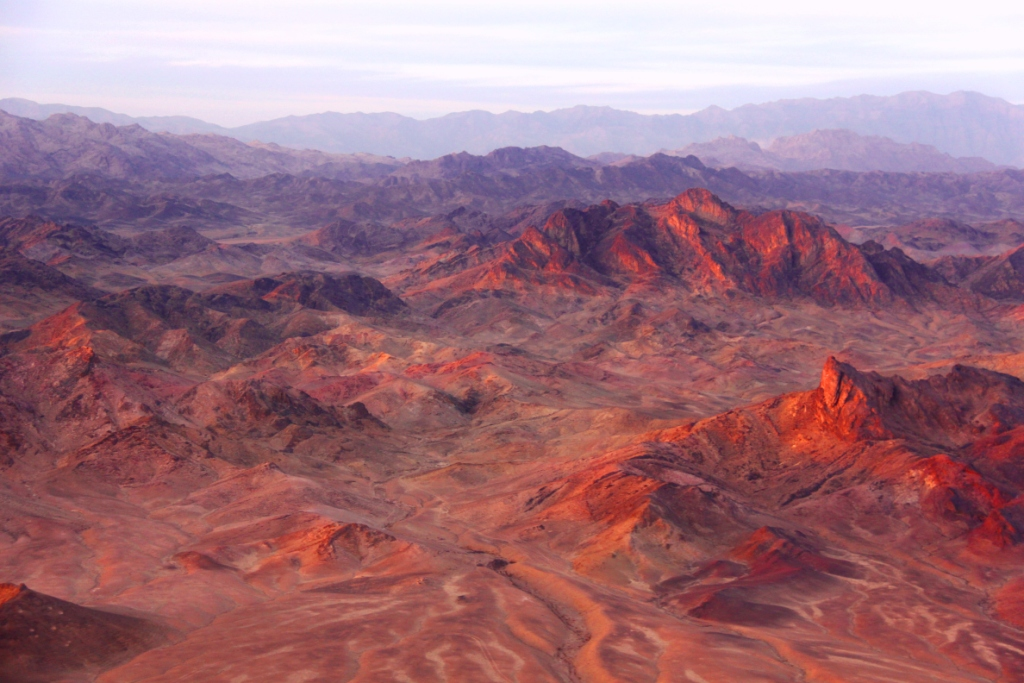
Mountains in Musa Qala District during sunset

Afghan National Security Forces, which includes Afghan National Police (ANP), Afghan Border Police (ABP) and Afghan Local Police (ALP)

Afghans with national flags

== See also ==
- 2007 Helmand province airstrikes
- Dasht-e Margo
- Operation Khanjar
- Provinces of Afghanistan
