= Danville High School (Illinois) =

Location
- 202 East Fairchild Street; Danville, Illinois 61832; United States; 40.1381°N 87.6267°W

Information
- School type: Public secondary
- Motto: Service
- Opened: 1870
- School district: Danville District 118
- Superintendent: Alicia Geddis
- Principal: Tracy Cherry
- Staff: 151
- Teaching staff: 70.00 (FTE)
- Grades: 9–12
- Gender: Coed
- Enrollment: 1,214 (2023–2024)
- Average class size: 21.6
- Student to teacher ratio: 17.34
- Campus type: urban
- Colors: Maroon; White
- Athletics: IHSA
- Athletics conference: Big Twelve
- Mascot: Odin
- Team name: Vikings/Lady Vikings
- Newspaper: Maroon & White
- Yearbook: Medley
- Website: dhs.danville118.org

Danville High School (DHS) is a public high school located in Danville, Illinois, United States. It is part of Danville District 118, which also includes two middle schools and eight elementary schools.

The district includes almost all of Danville and most of Tilton.

The school is perhaps best known for four of its alumni who went on to success in acting: Gene Hackman, the brothers Dick and Jerry Van Dyke, Donald O'Connor; and one who became an important figure in popularizing early twentieth-century popular music, Bobby Short.

== History ==
=== Principals ===
Charlotte "Tracy" Cherry, the current principal of Danville High School, is the school's 33rd principal since 1870.

Principal	Years
Belle Spillmen	1870-1874
Cornelia Branch	1874-1876
Annie Hoff	1876-1878
M. A. Lapham	1878-1879
Silas Y. Gillan	1879-1886
E. C. Williams	1886-1887
Lawrence A. McLauth	1887-1891
Stratton B. Brooks	1891-1892
S.A.D. Harry	1892-1897
Dr. B. D. Billinghurst	1897-1900
B. A. Sweet	1900-1902
Edwin D. Martin	1902-1905
Zora Mayo Smith	1905-1909
Charles E. Lawyer	1909-1912
A. W. Smalley	1912-1916
William C. Baer	1916-1930
John E. Wakeley	1930-1934
Russell M. Duffin	1935-1948
E. D. Milhon	1948-1967
Richard L. Burrer	1967-1969
Arthur F. Mathisen	1969-1980
Blaine E. Bonynge	1980-1989
Dr. Carl Esslinger (interim)	1989-1990
Dr. Ellen S. Russell	1990-1994
Dr. Carol A. Stack	1994-1996
Nanette L. Mellen	1996-2001
Mark Denman	2001-2004
Gail Garner	2004-2006
Marla Bauerle-Hill	2006-2008
Mark A. Neil	2008-2013
Phil Cox	2013-2015
Kimberly Norton	2015–2018
Tracy Cherry	2019-2023

== Academics ==
For the graduating class of 2016, DHS had an average composite ACT score of 17.6, and graduated 69.7% of its senior class.

In September 2009 the school hosted several education administrators from Taiwan who were visiting to not only see how the school functions, but to participate in a learning opportunity for the school's Global House.

== School activities ==
=== Activities ===
The school offers approximately 30 clubs and activities ranging from service-oriented clubs to academic competition, to art appreciation. Among the clubs which are chapters for more national organizations are Key Club, and National Honor Society.

The choral music program supports a choir, show choir, and madrigal program.

The instrumental music program supports two symphonic bands, a pep band (the Maroon Maniacs), percussion ensemble, jazz ensemble, madrigal brass band, marching band (Band of Vikings), a jazz combo (The Tenth Degree), madrigal strings, string orchestra and a symphony orchestra.

In 2021 the school staged the musical Bye Bye Birdie, which (at its 1958 Broadway premier) had starred alum Dick Van Dyke in the role of Albert Peterson. For the 2004 production, Van Dyke returned to the school, and learned one of the numbers ("Put On a Happy Face") alongside the students, performing both nights of the show. Van Dyke, who joined the military before receiving his diploma, was also granted his high school diploma at a ceremony.

=== Athletics ===
DHS competes in the Big Twelve conference and is a member of the Illinois High School Association (IHSA); the organization which organizes most interscholastic high school sports and competitive activities in the state of Illinois. Teams are stylized as the Vikings (or Lady Vikings for women's teams).

The school sponsors interscholastic teams for young men and women in basketball, cross country, soccer, swimming & diving, tennis, and track & field. Young men may participate in baseball, football, golf, and wrestling, while young women may compete in cheerleading and softball. While not sponsored by the IHSA, the Athletic Department also sponsors a poms team (Pompettes).

The following teams finished in the top four of their respective IHSA sponsored state championship tournament or meet:

- Basketball (boys): 3rd place (1970–71, 1992–93); 2nd place (1935–36, 1949–50)
- Football: 2nd place (1976–77); semifinals (1978-1979) (2009–10); semifinals (2010–2011)
- Golf (boys): 4th place (1938–39); State Champions (1981–82)
- Swimming & Diving (boys): 3rd place (1939–40, 1940–41)
- Tennis (boys): 4th place (1952–53, 1958–59, 1966–67); 3rd place (1946–47, 1947–48, 2002–03); 2nd place (1951–52, 1959–60); State Champions (1945–46, 1953–54)
- Track & field (boys): 3rd place (1983–84, 1989–90); State Champions (1924–25)
- JROTC drill (Chicago): 2nd place

=== Traditions ===
The school has two songs: a fight song and a cheer song. The cheer song's lyrics were borrowed from the cheer song written for Illinois Wesleyan University, substituting "Danville High" for "Wesleyan" and "maroon" for "green".

The school claims no knowledge as to why the school colors were chosen, though they date to at least 1906. The school's teams were originally stylized as the "Maroons". The school's teams briefly used the name "Silver Streaks" before adopting "Vikings" in 1960. While the Vikings name stuck, an attempt to change the school's primary color from maroon to light blue failed to catch on.

=== Dress code ===
As of the 2017–2018 school year, Danville District 118 had revised its old dress code into a new dress code that lets students dress freely as long as it is not vulgar or explicit.

== Notable alumni ==
- Jason Anderson, former Major League Baseball relief pitcher (2003–05)
- Irving Azoff, personal manager to several notable musical talents; former head of MCA Records; producer of several films (Fast Times at Ridgemont High); Chairman of Ticketmaster
- Kenneth D. Bailey, major in the United States Marine Corps; posthumously awarded the Medal of Honor for his actions at Matanikau River during the Battle of Guadalcanal in 1942; namesake of destroyer USS Kenneth D. Bailey
- William B. Black, member of the Illinois House of Representatives (1986–2010)
- Keon Clark, former NBA basketball player (1998–2004); selected in the first round of the 1998 NBA draft
- Laurie Perry Cookingham (1896–1992), city manager of multiple cities, including Kansas City, Missouri and Fort Worth, Texas
- Gene Hackman, Academy Award-winning actor, best known for his work in film (The French Connection, Unforgiven)
- Ned Luke, actor, Grand Theft Auto V
- Justin March-Lillard, NFL linebacker
- Greg Meidel, television producer
- John P. Meyer, Illinois state legislator and judge
- Donald O'Connor, Emmy Award-winning actor and dancer, perhaps best known for his role in the film Singin' in the Rain
- Julian Pearl, college football offensive tackle for the Illinois Fighting Illini
- Bill Putnam, audio engineer, songwriter, producer, studio designer and businessman, who has been described as "the father of modern recording"
- Scott Shaw, photojournalist; received the 1988 Pulitzer Prize for spot news photography
- Trent Sherfield, wide receiver for the Minnesota Vikings
- Bobby Short, singer and musician known for his interpretations of early 20th-century American music, and for promoting the compositions of African American composers
- Sterling Slaughter, former MLB player (Chicago Cubs)
- John W. Speakman, Illinois state legislator and lawyer
- Matthew Stover, science fiction and fantasy author of Heroes Die and novels set in the Star Wars universe, including Revenge of the Sith
- Joseph R. Tanner, former NASA astronaut; flew into space four times as a mission specialist where he performed work on the Hubble Space Telescope and International Space Station
- Edward R. Telling, Chairman and CEO of Sears, Roebuck and Company (1978–85)
- Dick Van Dyke, Emmy and Tony award-winning actor; was in the original Broadway cast of Bye Bye Birdie; worked in film (Mary Poppins) and television (The Dick Van Dyke Show, Diagnosis: Murder)
- Jerry Van Dyke, actor and musician best known for his work on television (My Mother the Car, Coach)
- James Vrentas, chemical engineer
- Reg Weaver, former president of the National Education Association; vice president for Education International
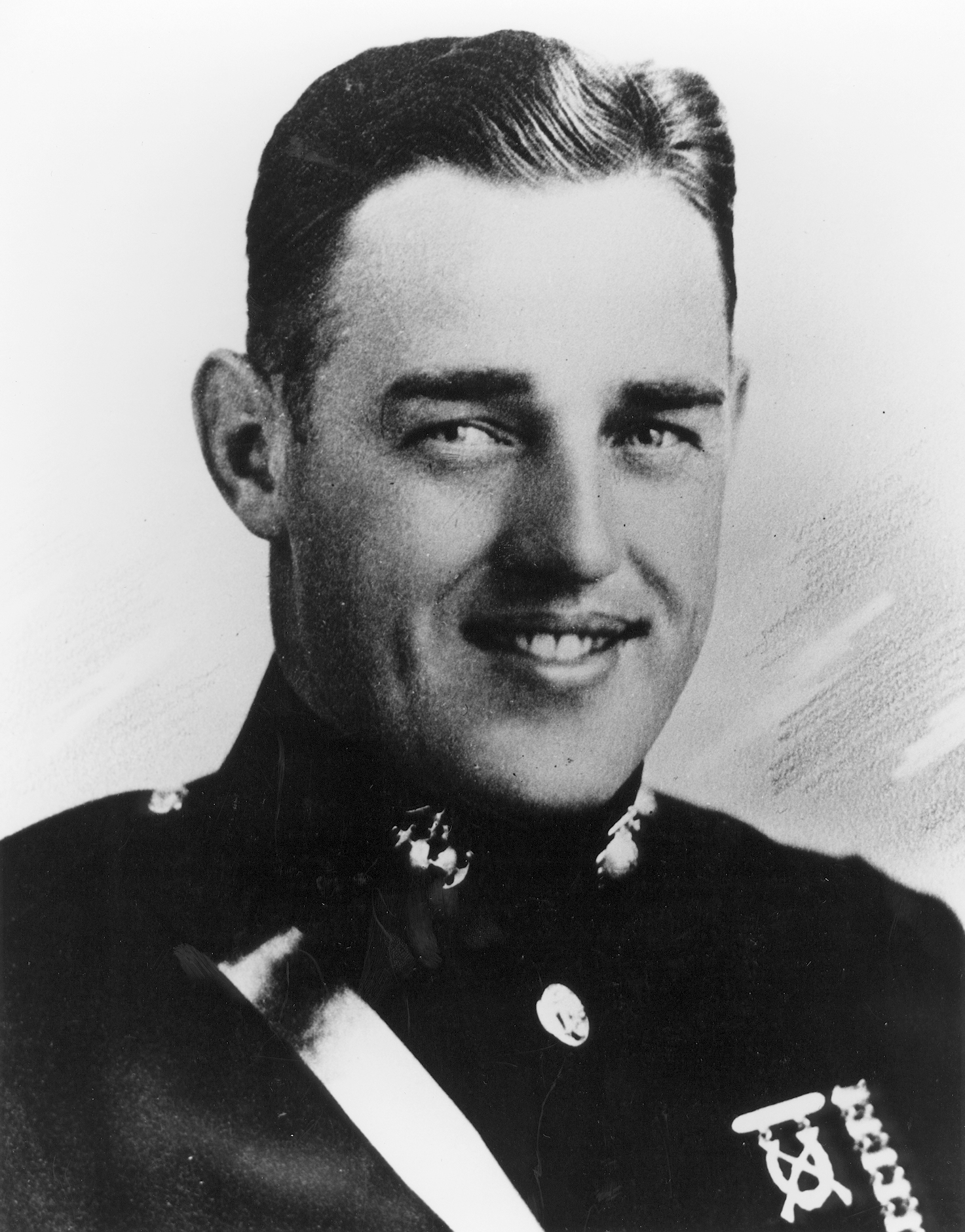
Maj. Kenneth D. Bailey, USMC

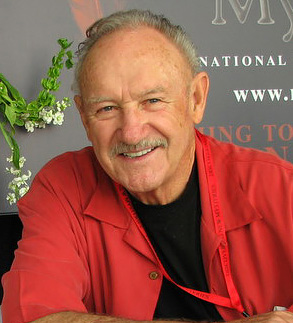
Gene Hackman

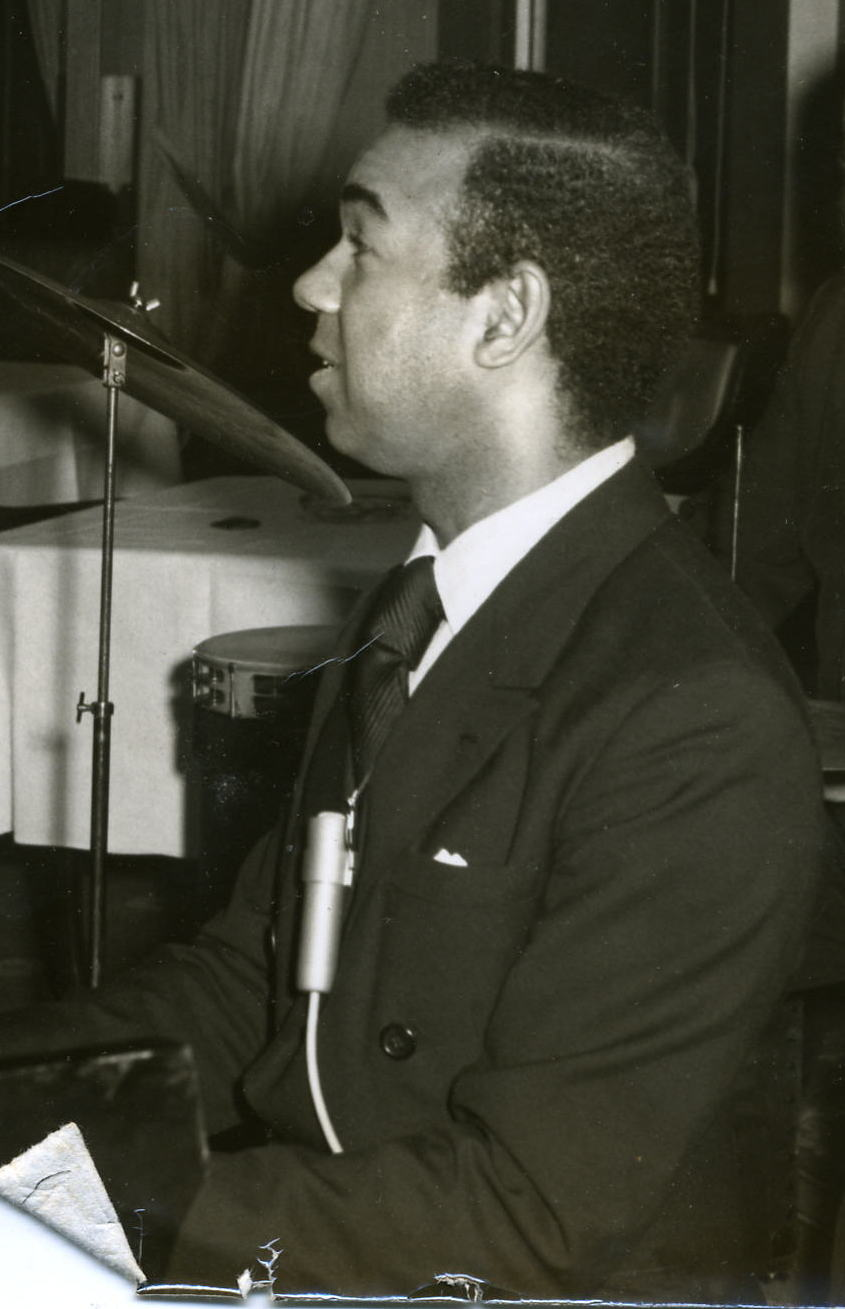
Bobby Short
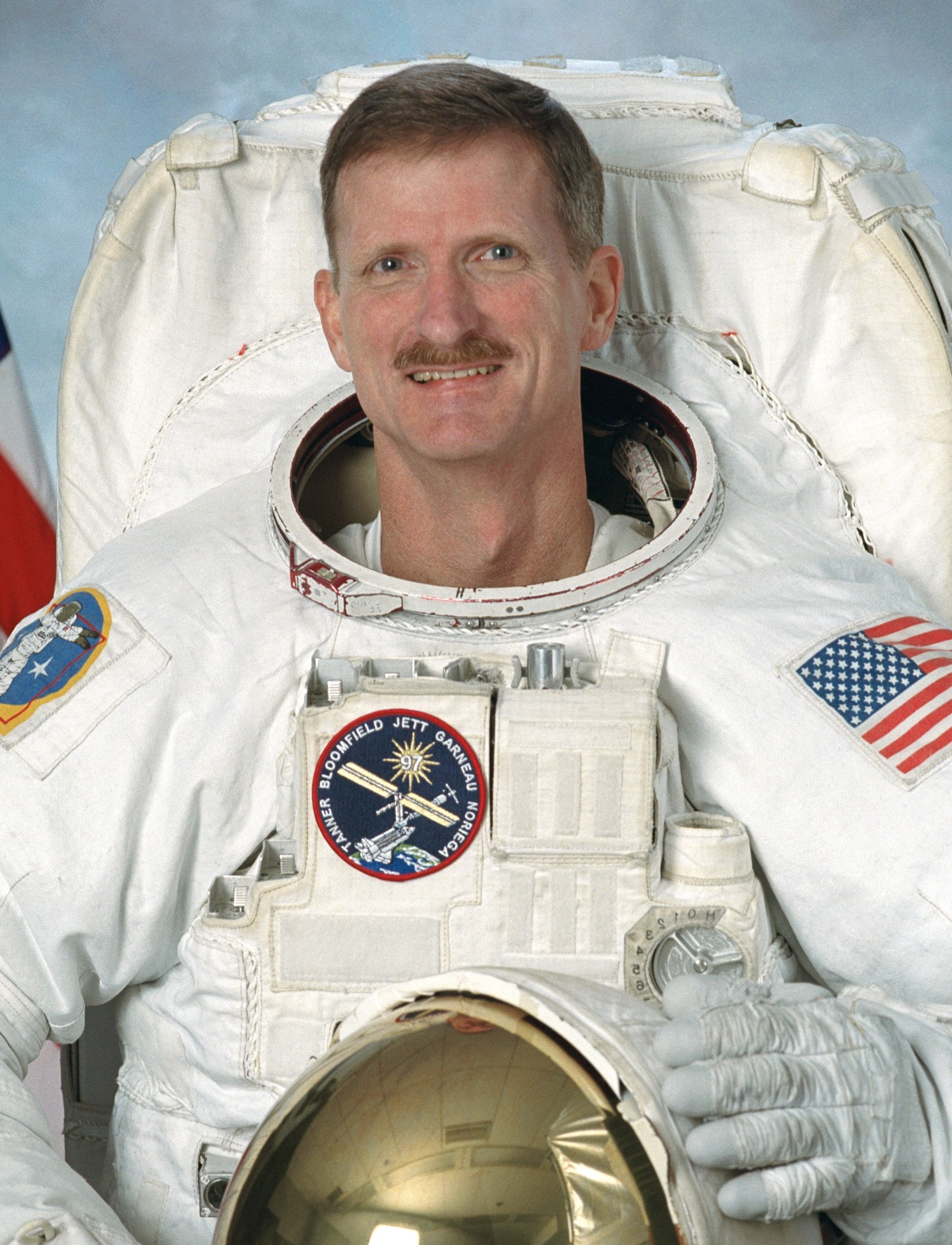
Joe Tanner

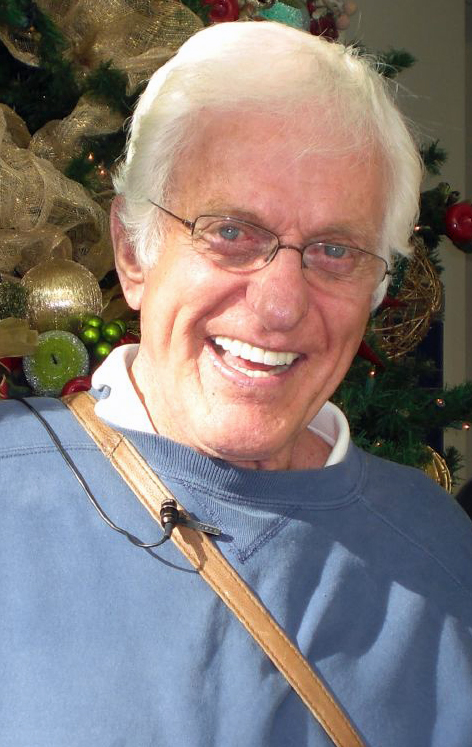
Dick Van Dyke

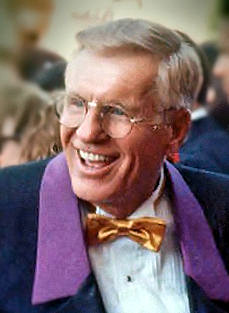
Jerry Van Dyke

== Bibliography ==
- Jones, Lottie E. (1911). History of Vermilion County, Illinois. Chicago, Illinois: Pioneer Publishing Company. pp. 255, 334–5.
