= General Keating =

General Keating may refer to:

- Frank A. Keating (1895–1973), U.S. Army major general
- Henry Sheehy Keating (1775–1847), British Army lieutenant general
- James J. Keating (1895–1978), U.S. Marine Corps brigadier general
- Tim Keating (soldier) (fl. 1980s–2010s), New Zealand Army lieutenant general

== See also ==
- Richard Harte Keatinge (1825–1904), British Indian Army lieutenant general
