= Senator Meyer =

Senator Meyer may refer to:

- J. Edward Meyer (born 1935), Connecticut State Senate
- John P. Meyer (1920–2013), Illinois State Senate
- Kevin Meyer (politician) (born 1956), Alaska State Senate
- Mark Meyer (politician) (born 1963), Wisconsin State Senate
- Schuyler M. Meyer (1885–1970), New York State Senate
- Selina Meyer, fictional senator portrayed by Julia Louis-Dreyfus in Veep
- Jan Meyers (1928–2019), Kansas State Senate

== See also ==
- Senator Meier (disambiguation)
- Senator Mayer (disambiguation)
