= Battle of Edson's Ridge =

WW2 battle in the Solomon Islands

- Part of the Pacific Theatre of World War II
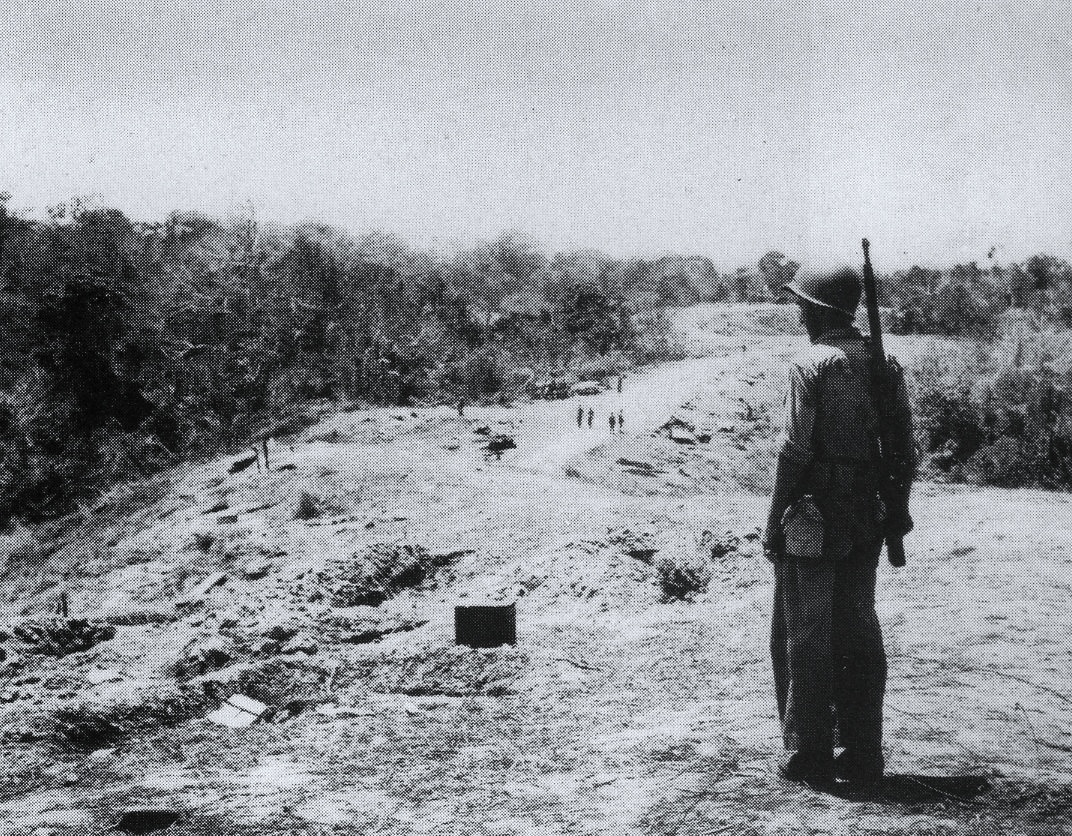
- A U.S. Marine stands near some of the fighting positions on Hill 123 on "Edson's" Ridge after the battle. Edson's command post during the battle was located just to the right of where the Marine is standing.
Date	12–14 September 1942
Location	Guadalcanal, Solomon Islands
Result	Allied victory

Belligerents
United States; United Kingdom: British Solomon Islands	Japan

Commanders and leaders
(United States) Alexander Vandegrift (United States) Merritt A. Edson	(Empire of Japan) Harukichi Hyakutake (Empire of Japan) Kiyotake Kawaguchi

Units involved
Henderson Field HQ Defenses; 1st Raider Battalion; 1st Parachute Battalion; 1st Tank Battalion; 2nd Battalion, 5th Marine Regiment; 3rd Battalion, 1st Marine Regiment; 3rd Battalion, 11th Marine Regiment; 67th Fighter Squadron	(Empire of Japan) Kawaguchi Detachment, Seventeenth Army; 35th Infantry Brigade; 124th Infantry Regiment; 1st Battalion; 2nd Battalion; 3rd Battalion; 28th Infantry Regiment; Kuma Battalion; Aoba Detachment (4th Infantry Regiment); 2nd Battalion; Remnants of the Ichiki Detachment (100 men)

Strength
12,500	6,217 (total Japanese troops on Guadalcanal at the time); Approximately 3,000 troops participated in the offensive.

Casualties and losses
104–111 killed or missing 278–283 wounded 4 tanks destroyed	700–800 dead or missing

The Battle of Edson's Ridge, also known as the Battle of the Bloody Ridge, Battle of Raiders Ridge, and Battle of the Ridge, was a land battle of the Pacific campaign of World War II between the Imperial Japanese Army and Allied (mainly United States Marine Corps) ground forces. It took place from 12 to 14 September 1942, on Guadalcanal in the Solomon Islands, and was the second of three separate major Japanese ground offensives during the Guadalcanal campaign.

In the battle, U.S. Marines under the overall command of U.S. Major General Alexander Vandegrift repulsed an attack by the Japanese 35th Infantry Brigade under the command of Japanese Major General Kiyotake Kawaguchi. The Marines were defending the Lunga perimeter that guarded Henderson Field on Guadalcanal, which was captured from the Japanese by the Allies in landings on Guadalcanal on 7 August 1942. Kawaguchi's unit was sent to Guadalcanal in response to the Allied landings with the mission of recapturing the airfield and driving the Allied forces from the island.

Underestimating the strength of Allied forces on Guadalcanal—over 12,000 men—Kawaguchi's 6,000 soldiers conducted several nighttime frontal assaults on the U.S. defenses. The main Japanese assault occurred around Lunga ridge south of Henderson Field, defended by troops from several U.S. Marine Corps units, primarily troops from the 1st Raider and 1st Parachute Battalions under the command of Lieutenant Colonel Merritt A. Edson. Although the Marine defenses were almost overrun, Kawaguchi's attack was ultimately defeated after fierce fighting, with heavy losses for the Japanese.

Because of the key participation by Edson's unit in defending the ridge, the ridge was commonly referred to as "Edson's" ridge in historical accounts of the battle in Western sources. After Edson's Ridge, the Japanese continued to send troops to Guadalcanal for further attempts to retake Henderson Field, affecting Japanese offensive operations in other areas of the South Pacific. According to the participants on both sides, Edson's Ridge was the closest the Japanese came to winning the overall battle for Guadalcanal.

== Background ==
=== Guadalcanal campaign ===
On 7 August 1942, Allied forces (primarily U.S.) landed on Guadalcanal, Tulagi, and Florida Islands in the Solomon Islands. The landings on the islands were meant to deny their use by the Japanese as bases for threatening the supply routes between the U.S. and Australia. They were also intended to secure the islands as starting points for a campaign to neutralize the major Japanese base at Rabaul and support the Allied New Guinea campaign. The landings initiated the six-month-long Guadalcanal campaign.

Taking the Japanese by surprise, by nightfall on 8 August the Allied landing forces had secured Tulagi and nearby small islands, as well as an airfield under construction at Lunga Point (9°25′45″S 160°3′4″E) on the north shore of the island of Guadalcanal, east of the present day capital of Honiara. By 9 August, 10,900 troops from Major General Alexander Vandegrift's 1st Marine Division were on Guadalcanal, occupying a loose perimeter around the Lunga Point area.

On 12 August, the airfield was named Henderson Field after Major Lofton Henderson, a Marine aviator who had been killed at the Battle of Midway. The Allied aircraft and pilots that subsequently operated out of Henderson Field were called the "Cactus Air Force" after the Allied code name for Guadalcanal.

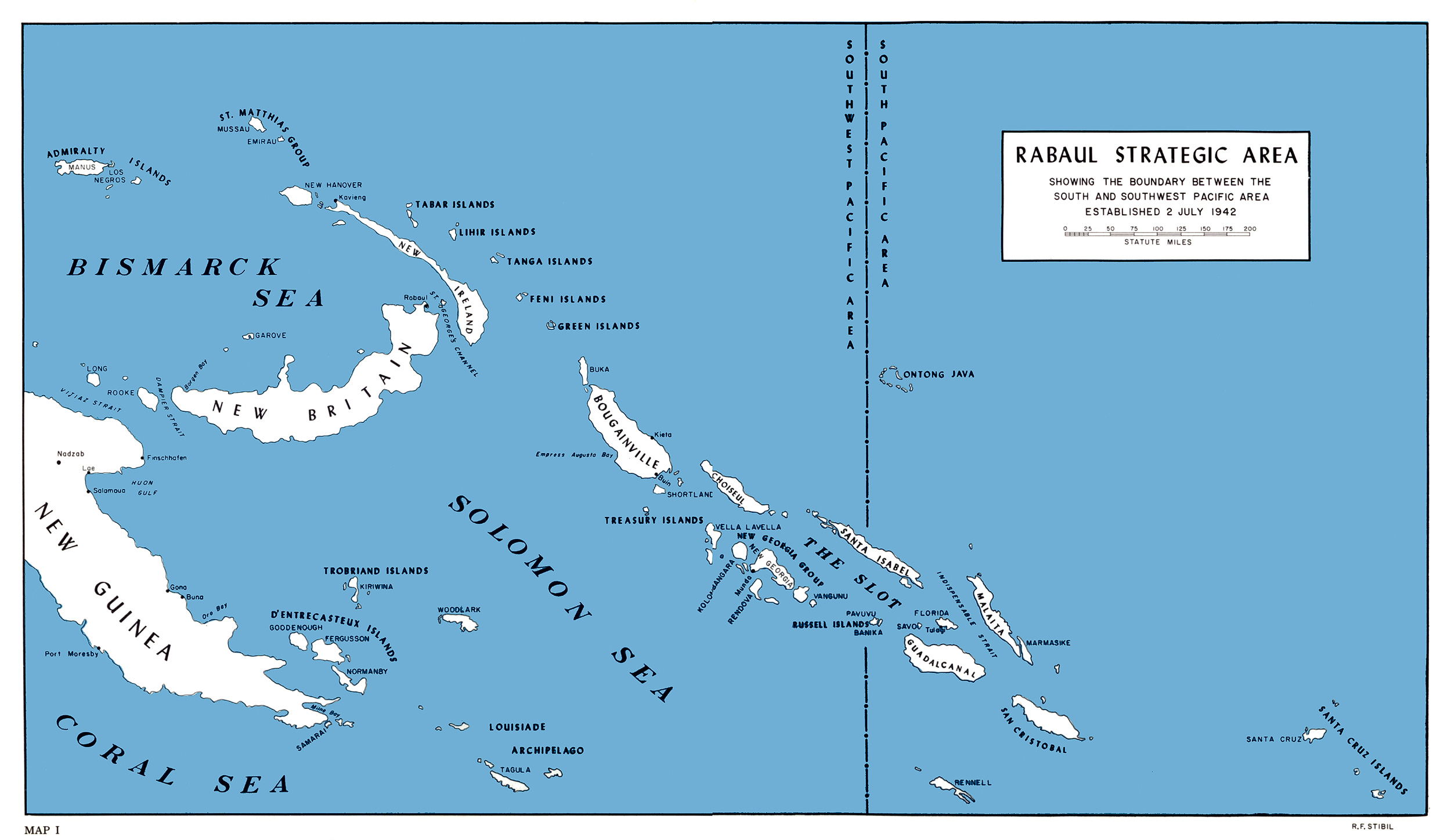
The Solomon Islands area in the south Pacific. The Japanese base at Rabaul is at the upper left. Guadalcanal (lower right) lies at the southeastern end of "The Slot".

In response to the Allied landings on Guadalcanal, the Japanese Imperial General Headquarters assigned the Imperial Japanese Army's 17th Army—a corps-sized command based at Rabaul (4°11′56″S 152°9′57″E) under the command of Lieutenant-General Harukichi Hyakutake—with the task of retaking Guadalcanal from Allied forces. The 17th Army, already heavily involved with the Japanese campaign in New Guinea, had only a few units available to send to the southern Solomons area. Of these units, the 35th Infantry Brigade under Major General Kiyotake Kawaguchi was at Palau, the 4th (Aoba) Infantry Regiment under Major General Yumio Nasu was in the Philippines, and the 28th Infantry Regiment under Colonel Kiyonao Ichiki was embarked on transport ships near Guam. The different units began to move toward Guadalcanal immediately; Ichiki's regiment, the closest, arrived first. The "First Element" of Ichiki's unit—consisting of about 917 soldiers—landed from destroyers at Taivu Point (9°24′38″S 160°20′56″E), about 18 mi (29 km) east of the Lunga perimeter, on 19 August.

Underestimating the strength of Allied forces on Guadalcanal, Ichiki's First Element conducted a nighttime frontal assault on Marine positions at Alligator Creek on the east side of the Lunga perimeter in the early morning hours of 21 August. Ichiki's assault was repulsed with devastating losses for the attackers in what became known as the Battle of the Tenaru: all but 128 of the 917 men of the First Element (including Ichiki) were killed in the battle. The survivors returned to Taivu Point, notified 17th Army headquarters of their defeat in the battle and awaited further reinforcements and orders from Rabaul.

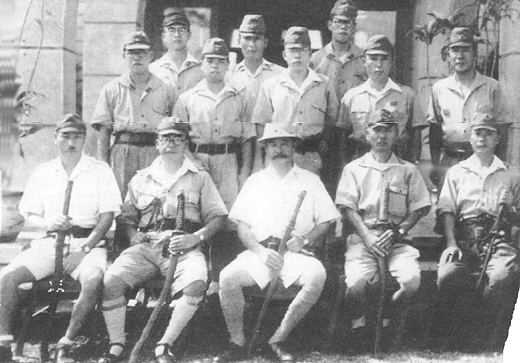
Japanese Major General Kiyotake Kawaguchi (seated center) in a group photo with his brigade staff at Palau shortly before departing for Guadalcanal.

By 23 August, Kawaguchi's unit had reached Truk and was loaded onto slow transport ships for the rest of the trip to Guadalcanal. Because of the damage caused by Allied air attack to a separate troop convoy during the Battle of the Eastern Solomons, the Japanese decided not to deliver Kawaguchi's troops to Guadalcanal by slow transport ship; instead, the ships carrying Kawaguchi's soldiers were sent to Rabaul. From there, the Japanese planned to deliver Kawaguchi's men to Guadalcanal by destroyers, staging through a Japanese naval base in the Shortland Islands. The Japanese destroyers were usually able to make the round trip down "The Slot" to Guadalcanal and back in a single night, minimizing their exposure to Allied air attack. However, most of the soldiers' heavy equipment and supplies, such as heavy artillery, vehicles, and much food and ammunition, could not be taken to Guadalcanal with them. These high-speed destroyer runs to Guadalcanal, which occurred throughout the campaign, were later called the "Tokyo Express" by Allied forces and "Rat Transportation" by the Japanese.

The Japanese controlled the seas around the Solomon Islands during the nighttime and were not challenged by the Allies. However, any Japanese ship remaining within the 200 mi (320 km) range of the aircraft at Henderson Field in daylight was in great danger from air attacks. This "curious tactical situation" held for several months.

=== Troop movement ===
On 28 August 600 of Kawaguchi's troops were loaded onto the destroyers Asagiri, Amagiri, Yūgiri, and Shirakumo, designated Destroyer Division 20 (DesDiv20). Because of a shortage of fuel, DesDiv20 could not make the entire round trip to Guadalcanal at high speed in one night and had to start the trip earlier in the day so that they could complete the trip by the next morning at a slower speed which conserved fuel. At 18:05 that day, 11 U.S. dive bombers from VMSB-232, under the command of Lt. Col. Richard Mangrum, flew from Henderson Field and located and attacked DesDiv20 about 70 mi (110 km) north of Guadalcanal, sinking Asagiri and heavily damaging Yugiri and Shirakumo. Amagiri took Shirakumo in tow and the three destroyers returned to the Shortlands without completing their mission. The attack on DesDiv20 killed 62 of Kawaguchi's soldiers and 94 crew members.

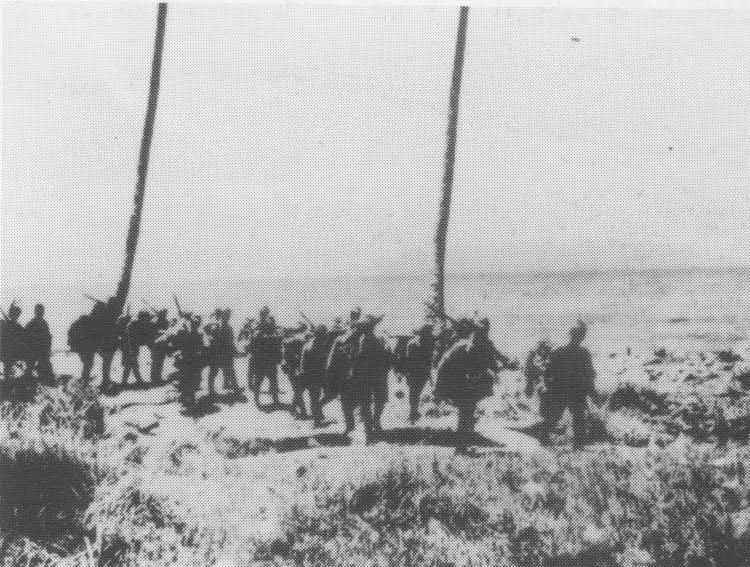
Japanese troops from the Aoba Detachment march along the shore of Guadalcanal shortly after landing during the first week of September 1942.

Subsequent "Tokyo Express" runs were more successful. Between 29 August and 4 September, various Japanese light cruisers, destroyers, and patrol boats were able to land almost 5,000 troops at Taivu Point, including all of the 35th Infantry Brigade, one battalion of the Aoba Regiment, and the rest of Ichiki's regiment. General Kawaguchi, who landed at Taivu Point on 31 August, was placed in command of all the Japanese troops on Guadalcanal.

On the night of 4/5 September, as three of the destroyers—Yūdachi, Hatsuyuki, and Murakumo—prepared to shell Henderson Field after landing their troops, they detected and sank two U.S. ships in the vicinity, the small, old destroyer transports (called "APDs" by the U.S. Marines) USS Little and Gregory that were used to shuttle Allied troops around the Guadalcanal/Tulagi area.

In spite of the successes of the destroyer runs, Kawaguchi insisted that as many soldiers of his brigade as possible be delivered to Guadalcanal by slow barges. Therefore, a convoy carrying 1,100 of Kawaguchi's troops and heavy equipment in 61 barges, mainly from the 2nd Battalion, 124th Infantry Regiment under the command of Colonel Akinosuka Oka, departed the northern coast of Santa Isabel Island on 2 September. On 4–5 September, aircraft from Henderson Field attacked the barge convoy, killing about 90 of the soldiers in the barges and destroying much of the unit's heavy equipment. Most of the remaining 1,000 troops were able to land near Kamimbo (9°15′32″S 159°40′18″E), west of the Lunga perimeter over the next few days. By 7 September, Kawaguchi had 5,200 troops at Taivu Point and 1,000 west of the Lunga perimeter. Kawaguchi was confident enough that he could defeat the Allied forces facing him that he declined an offer from the 17th Army for delivery of one more infantry battalion to augment his forces. Kawaguchi believed that there were only about 2,000 U.S. Marines on Guadalcanal.

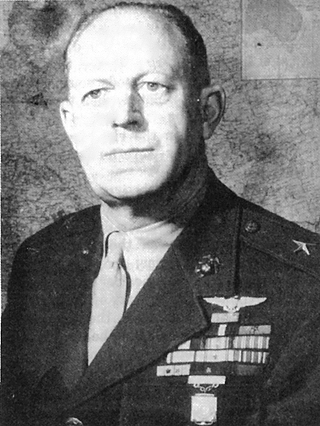
Merritt A. Edson commanded the U.S. Marine 1st Raider Battalion during the battle.

During this time, Vandegrift continued to direct efforts to strengthen and improve the defenses of the Lunga perimeter. Between 21 August and 3 September, he relocated three Marine battalions—including the 1st Raider Battalion, under U.S. Lieutenant Colonel Merritt A. Edson (Edson's Raiders), and the 1st Parachute Battalion—from Tulagi and Gavutu to Guadalcanal. These units added about 1,500 troops to Vandegrift's original 11,000 men defending Henderson Field. The 1st Parachute battalion, which had suffered heavy casualties in the Battle of Tulagi and Gavutu-Tanambogo in August, was placed under Edson's command.

== Battle ==
=== Prelude ===
Kawaguchi set the date for his attack on the Lunga perimeter for 12 September and began marching his forces west from Taivu towards Lunga Point on 5 September. He radioed 17th Army and requested that it carry out air strikes on Henderson Field beginning on 9 September and that naval warships be stationed off Lunga Point on 12 September to "destroy any Americans who attempted to flee from the island."

On 7 September, Kawaguchi issued his attack plan to "rout and annihilate the enemy in the vicinity of the Guadalcanal Island airfield." Kawaguchi's plan called for his forces to split into three, approach the Lunga perimeter inland, and launch a surprise night attack. Oka's force, the 2nd Battalion, 124th Infantry Regiment, 35th Infantry Brigade, would attack the perimeter from the west while Ichiki's Second Echelon, renamed the Kuma Battalion, under Major Takeshi Mizuno—would attack from the east. The main attack would be by Kawaguchi's "Center Body", numbering 3,000 men in three battalions, the 124th's 1st and 3rd battalions and the 2nd Battalion, 4th Infantry Regiment, from the south of the Lunga perimeter. By 7 September, most of Kawaguchi's troops had started marching from Taivu towards Lunga Point along the coastline. About 250 Japanese troops remained behind to guard the brigade's supply base at Taivu.

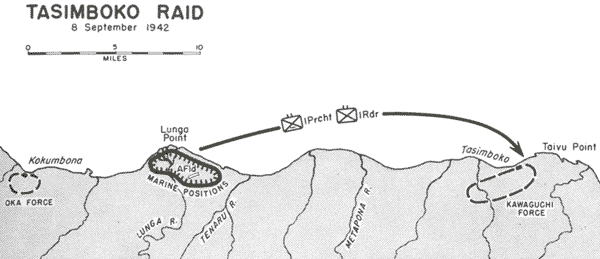
Map of Edson's Tasimboko Raid.

Meanwhile, native island scouts—directed by British government official and officer in the British Solomon Islands Protectorate Defence Force, Martin Clemens—told the Marines of Japanese troops at Taivu, near the village of Tasimboko, about 17 mi (27 km) east of Lunga. Edson launched a raid against the Japanese troops at Taivu. Destroyer transports USS McKean and Manley and two patrol boats took 813 of Edson's men to Taivu in two trips.

Edson and his first wave of 501 troops landed at Taivu at 05:20 on 8 September. Supported by aircraft from Henderson Field and gunfire from the destroyer transports, Edson's men advanced towards Tasimboko village but were slowed by Japanese resistance. At 11:00, the rest of Edson's men landed. With this reinforcement and more support from the Henderson Field aircraft, Edson's force pushed into the village. The Japanese defenders, believing a major landing was underway after observing the concurrent approach of an Allied supply ship convoy heading towards Lunga Point, retreated into the jungle, leaving behind 27 dead. Two Marines were killed.

In Tasimboko, Edson's troops discovered the supply base for Kawaguchi's forces, including large stockpiles of food, ammunition and medical supplies, and a shortwave radio. The Marines seized documents, equipment and food supplies, destroyed the rest, and returned to the Lunga perimeter at 17:30. The quantities of supplies and intelligence from the captured documents revealed that at least 3,000 Japanese troops were on the island and apparently planning an attack.

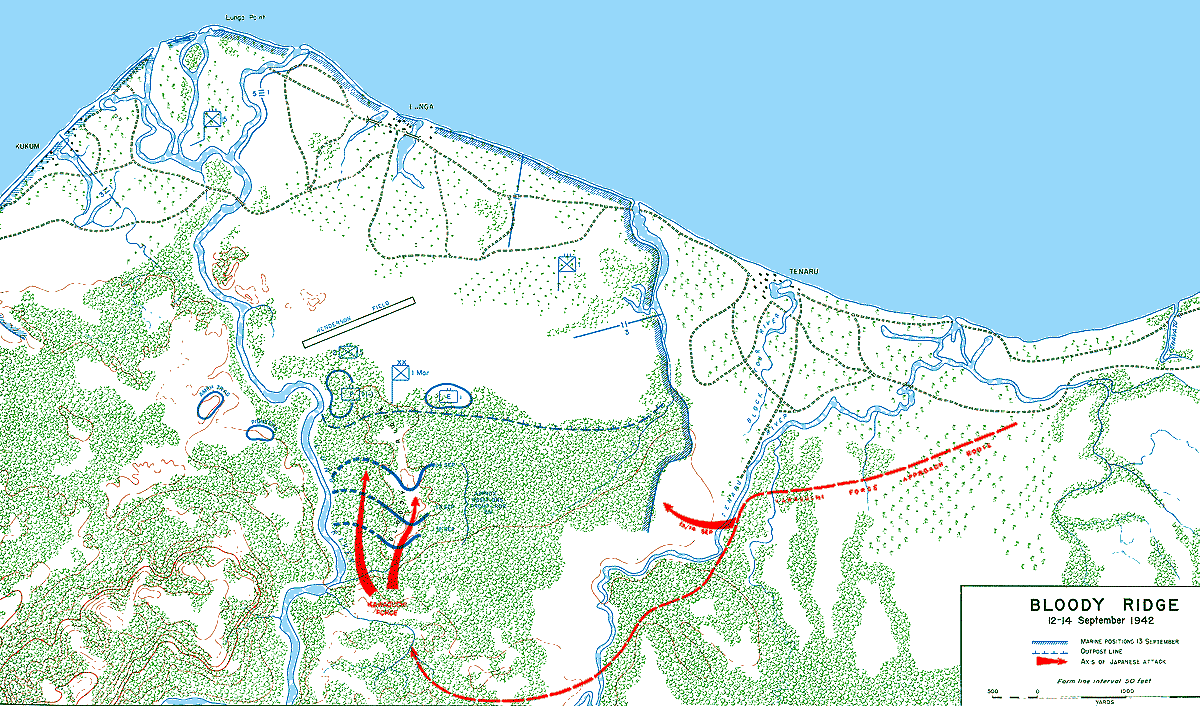
Map of the Lunga perimeter on Guadalcanal showing the approach routes of the Japanese forces and the locations of the Japanese attacks during the battle. Oka's attacks were in the west (left), the Kuma Battalion attacked from the east (right) and the Center Body attacked "Edson's Ridge" in the lower center of the map.

Edson and Colonel Gerald Thomas, Vandegrift's operations officer, believed that the Japanese attack would come at the Lunga Ridge, a narrow, grassy, 1,000 m (1,100 yd) long, coral ridge (09°26′49″S 160°02′51″E) parallel to the Lunga River just south of Henderson Field. The ridge offered a natural avenue of approach to the airfield, commanded the surrounding area and was almost undefended. Edson and Thomas tried to persuade Vandegrift to move forces to defend the ridge, but Vandegrift refused, believing that the Japanese were more likely to attack along the coast. Finally, Thomas convinced Vandegrift that the ridge was a good location for Edson's Raiders to "rest" from their actions of the preceding month. On 11 September, the 840 men of Edson's unit—including the 1st Raiders and the Paramarines—deployed onto and around the ridge and prepared to defend it.

Kawaguchi's Center Body of troops was planning to attack the Lunga perimeter at the ridge, which they called "the centipede" (mukade gata) because of its shape. On 9 September, Kawaguchi's troops left the coast at Koli Point. Split into four columns, they marched into the jungle towards their designated attack points south and southeast of the airfield. Lack of good maps, at least one faulty compass, and thick, almost impenetrable jungle caused the Japanese columns to proceed slowly and zigzag, costing a lot of time. At the same time, Oka's troops approached the Lunga perimeter from the west. Oka had some intelligence on the Marine defenses, extracted from a U.S. Army pilot captured on 30 August.

During the day of 12 September, Kawaguchi's troops struggled through the jungle toward their assembly points for that night's attacks. Kawaguchi wanted his three Center Body battalions in place by 14:00, but they did not reach their assembly areas until after 22:00. Oka was also delayed in his advance towards the Marine lines in the west. Only the Kuma battalion reported that they were in place on time. Despite the problems in reaching the planned attack positions, Kawaguchi was still confident in his attack plan because a captured U.S. pilot disclosed that the ridge was the weakest part of the Marine defenses. Japanese bombers attacked the ridge during daytime on 11–12 September, causing a few casualties, including two killed.

=== First night's action ===
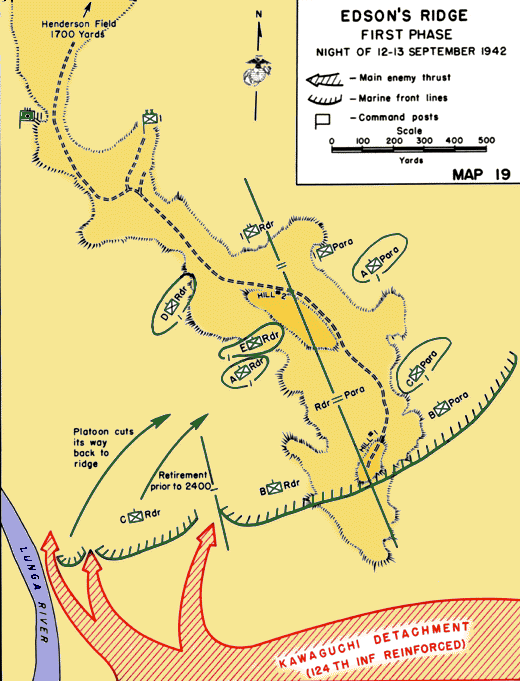
Action on 12 September. The Japanese Kokusho battalion forces the U.S. Raider's Company C to retreat to the ridge. Here, Hill 1 and Hill 2 are Hill 80 and Hill 123 in the main text

The Americans knew of the approach of the Japanese forces from reports from native scouts and their own patrols but did not know exactly where or when they would attack. The ridge around which Edson deployed his men consisted of three distinct hillocks. At the southern tip and surrounded on three sides by thick jungle was Hill 80 (so named because it rose 80 ft (24 m) above sea level). Six hundred yards north was Hill 123 (123 ft (37 m) high), the dominant feature on the ridge. The northernmost hillock was unnamed and about 60 ft (18 m) high. Edson placed the five companies from the Raider battalion on the west side of the ridge and the three Parachute battalion companies on the east side, holding positions in depth from Hill 80 back to Hill 123. Two of the five Raider companies, "B" and "C", held a line between the ridge, a small swampy lagoon, and the Lunga River. Machine-gun teams from "E" Company, the heavy weapons company, were scattered throughout the defenses. Edson placed his command post on Hill 123.

At 21:30 on 12 September, the Japanese cruiser Sendai and three destroyers shelled the Lunga perimeter for 20 minutes and illuminated the ridge with a searchlight. Japanese artillery began shelling the Marine lines but did little damage. At the same time, scattered groups of Kawaguchi's troops began skirmishing with Marines around the ridge. Kawaguchi's 1st Battalion—led by Major Yukichi Kokusho—attacked the Raiders' "C" company between the lagoon and the Lunga River, overrunning at least one platoon and forcing the Marine company to fall back to the ridge. Kokusho's unit became entangled with troops from Kawaguchi's 3rd Battalion under Lieutenant Colonel Kusukichi Watanabe, who were still struggling to reach their attack positions, and the resulting confusion effectively stopped the Japanese attack on the ridge that night. Kawaguchi, who was having trouble locating where he was in relation to the Marine lines as well as coordinating his troops' attacks, later complained, "Due to the devilish jungle, the brigade was scattered all over and was completely beyond my control. In my whole life I have never felt so disappointed and helpless." Twelve Marines were killed; Japanese casualties are unknown but perhaps somewhat greater. Although both Oka in the west and the Kuma unit in the east tried to attack the Marine lines that night, they failed to make contact and halted near the Marine lines at dawn.

At first light on 13 September, Cactus Air Force aircraft and Marine artillery fired into the area just south of the ridge, forcing any Japanese out in the open to seek cover in the nearby jungle. The Japanese suffered several casualties, including two officers from Watanabe's battalion. At 05:50, Kawaguchi decided to regroup his forces for another attack that night.

=== Second night's action ===
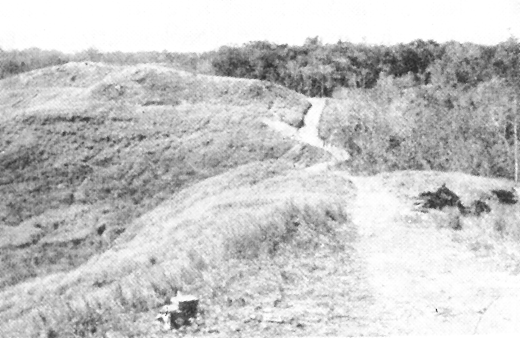
A view of Hill 123 around which Edson centered his defenses for the battle on 13 September. This view is from Hill 80 looking northwards.

Expecting the Japanese to attack again that night, Edson directed his troops to improve their defenses on and around the ridge. After a failed attempt by two companies to retake the ground on the Marine right flank lost to Kokusho the night before, Edson repositioned his forces. He pulled his front back about 400 yd (370 m) to a line that stretched 1,800 yd (1,600 m), starting at the Lunga River and crossing the ridge about 150 yd (140 m) south of Hill 123. Around and behind Hill 123 he placed five companies. Any Japanese attackers surmounting Hill 80 would have to advance over 400 yd (370 m) of open terrain to close with the Marine positions at Hill 123. With only a few hours to prepare, the Marines were able to construct only rudimentary and shallow fortifications. They were low on ammunition, with one or two grenades for each Marine. Vandegrift ordered a reserve force consisting of the 2nd Battalion, 5th Marine Regiment (2/5) to move into a position just to the rear of Edson's troops. In addition, a battery of four 105 mm howitzers from the 3rd Battalion, 11th Marine Regiment under Lieutenant Colonel James J. Keating moved to a location from where it could provide direct fire onto the ridge, and a forward artillery observer was placed with Edson's front line units.

Late in the afternoon, Edson stepped onto a grenade box and addressed his exhausted troops, saying,

You men have done a great job, and I have just one more thing to ask of you. Hold out just one more night. I know we've been without sleep a long time. But we expect another attack from them tonight and they may come through here. I have every reason to believe that we will have reliefs here for all of us in the morning.

Edson's speech "raised the spirits" of the Raiders and helped them prepare mentally for the night ahead.

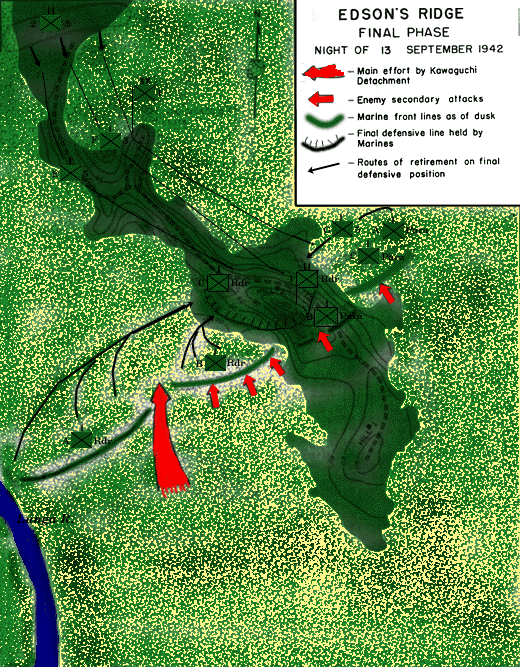
Action on 13 September. Japanese attacks force Edson's troops into a small perimeter around Hill 123.

As the sun set on 13 September, Kawaguchi faced Edson's 830 Marines with 3,000 troops of his brigade, plus an assortment of light artillery. The night was dark, with no moon. At 21:00, seven Japanese destroyers briefly bombarded the ridge. Kawaguchi's attack began just after nightfall, with Kokusho's battalion assaulting Raider Company B on the Marine right flank, just to the west of the ridge. The force of the assault caused Company B to fall back to Hill 123. Under Marine artillery fire, Kokusho reassembled his men and continued his attack. Without pausing to try to "roll-up" the other nearby Marine units, whose flanks were now unprotected, Kokusho's unit surged forward through the swampy lowlands between the ridge and the Lunga River, heading for the airfield. Kokusho's men came upon a pile of Marine supplies and rations. Not having eaten adequately for a couple of days, they paused to "gorge themselves" on the "C" and "K" rations. Kokusho ordered his men to continue the attack. At about 03:00, he led them against the Marine units around the northern portion of the ridge, just short of the airfield, as well as Hill 123. In the heavy fighting that followed, Kokusho and around 100 of his men were killed, ending that attack.

Meanwhile, Kawaguchi's 2nd Battalion, under Major Masao Tamura, assembled for their planned assault against Hill 80 from the jungle south of the ridge. Marine observers spotted Tamura's preparations and called in artillery fire. At about 22:00, a barrage from twelve 105 mm (4.1 in) guns hit Tamura's position. In response, two companies of Tamura's troops—numbering about 320 men—charged up Hill 80 with fixed bayonets behind their own barrage of mortar fire and grenades. Tamura's attack hit Company B of the Marine Parachute battalion and also Raider Company B, pushing the Parachutists off the east side of the ridge into a draw below the ridgeline. To protect the exposed Raider Company B, Edson ordered them to pull back onto Hill 123.

At the same time, a Japanese company from Watanabe's battalion infiltrated through a gap between the east side of the ridge and Parachute Company C. Deciding that their positions were untenable, Parachute Companies B and C climbed onto the ridge and retreated to a position behind Hill 123. In the darkness and confusion of the battle, the retreat quickly became confused and disorganized. A few Marines began yelling that the Japanese were attacking with poison gas, scaring other Marines who no longer possessed their gas masks. After arriving behind Hill 123, some of the Marines continued on towards the airfield, repeating the word "withdraw" to anyone within earshot. Other Marines began to follow them. Just at the moment that it appeared that the Marines on the hill were about to break and head for the rear in a rout, Major Kenneth D. Bailey from Edson's staff, and other Marine officers appeared and, with "vivid" language, herded the Marines back into defensive positions around Hill 123.

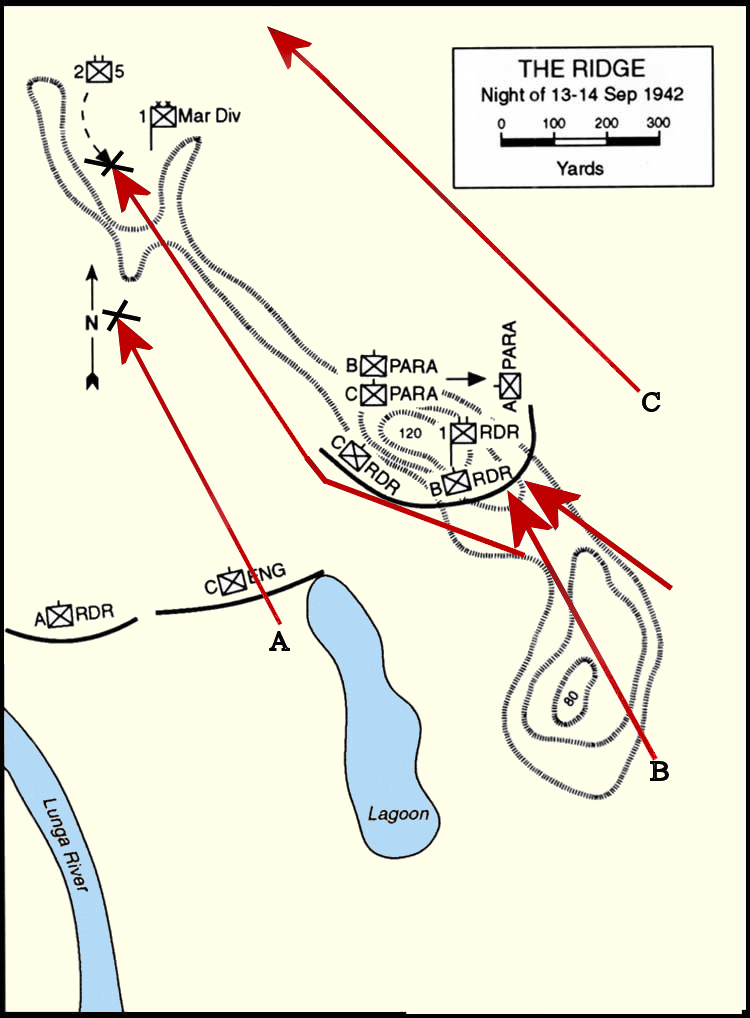
Map of the final phase of the battle on the ridge. The red lines represent Japanese attacks and the black lines are the Marine positions. "A" represents Kokusho's battalion, "B" Tamura's battalion, and "C" the infiltration by one company of Watanabe's battalion.

As the Marines formed into a horseshoe-shaped line around Hill 123, Tamura's battalion began a series of frontal assaults on the hill, charging up the saddle from Hill 80 and up from below the east side of the ridge. Under the light of parachute flares dropped by at least one Japanese floatplane, the Marines repulsed the first two attacks by Tamura's men. Tamura's troops hoisted a 75 mm (2.95 in) "regimental" gun to the top of Hill 80 in an effort to fire it directly at the Marines. This gun, which "could have turned the tide in favor of the Japanese," however, was disabled by a faulty firing pin. At midnight, during a short lull in the fighting, Edson ordered Parachute Companies B and C to advance from behind Hill 123 to strengthen his left flank. With fixed bayonets, the Paramarines swept forward, killing Japanese soldiers who had overrun the Marine lines and were apparently preparing to roll up the Marine lines from the flank, and took position on the east side of the hill. Marines from other units, as well as members of Edson's command staff, including Major Bailey, took ammunition and grenades under fire to the Marines around Hill 123, who were running critically low. Said Marine participant Captain William J. McKennan, "The Japanese attack was almost constant, like a rain that subsides for a moment and then pours the harder ... When one wave was mowed down—and I mean mowed down—another followed it into death."

The Japanese hit Edson's left flank just after the Parachutists took position but were again stopped by Marine rifle, machine-gun, mortar, and grenade fire. Marine 105 mm and 75 mm artillery was also taking a heavy toll on the attacking Japanese. A captured Japanese soldier later said that his unit was "annihilated" by the Marine artillery fire, which only 10% of his company survived.

By 04:00, after withstanding several more assaults, some of which resulted in hand-to-hand fighting, and severe sniper fire from all sides, Edson's men were joined by troops from 2/5 who helped repulse two more Japanese attacks before dawn. Throughout the night, as Kawaguchi's men came close to overrunning the Marine defenses, Edson remained standing about 20 yd (18 m) behind the Marine firing line on Hill 123, exhorting his troops and directing their defensive efforts. Marine Captain Tex Smith, who was in position to observe Edson for most of the night, said: "I can say that if there is such a thing as one man holding a battalion together, Edson did it that night. He stood just behind the front lines—stood, when most of us hugged the ground."

During the heavy fighting, portions of three Japanese companies, including two from Tamura's and one from Watanabe's battalions, skirted the Marine defenses on the ridge, while suffering heavy losses from Marine gunfire, and reached the edge of "Fighter One", a secondary runway of Henderson Field. A counterattack by the Marine engineers stopped one Japanese company's advances and forced it to retreat. The other two companies waited at the edge of the jungle for reinforcements to arrive before attacking into the open area around the airfield. When no reinforcements joined them, both companies went back to their original positions south of the ridge after daybreak. Most of the rest of Watanabe's battalion did not participate in the battle because they lost contact with their commander during the night.

As the sun rose on 14 September, pockets of Japanese soldiers remained scattered along both sides of the ridge. But with Tamura's battalion shattered after losing three-quarters of its officers and men, and with heavy casualties to his other attacking units as well, Kawaguchi's assault on the ridge had effectively ended. About 100 Japanese soldiers still remained in the open on the south slope of Hill 80, perhaps preparing for one more charge on Hill 123. At first light, three U.S. Army P-400 Airacobra fighters from the 67th Fighter Squadron at Henderson Field, acting on a request personally delivered by Bailey, strafed the Japanese near Hill 80 and killed most of them, with the few survivors retreating into the jungle.

=== Kuma and Oka attacks ===
As the battle on the ridge took place, Kawaguchi's Kuma and Oka units also attacked the Marine defenses on the east and west sides of the Lunga perimeter. The Kuma battalion—led by Major Takeshi Mizuno—attacked the southeastern sector of the Lunga perimeter, defended by Marines of the 3rd Battalion, 1st Marine Regiment. Mizuno's attack started around midnight, with one company attacking through Marine artillery fire and engaging in hand-to-hand combat with the Marine defenders before being thrown back. Mizuno was killed in the attack. After daybreak, the Marines, believing that the rest of Mizuno's battalion was still in the area, sent forward six light tanks without infantry support to sweep the area in front of the Marine lines; four Japanese 37 mm (1.46 in) anti-tank guns destroyed or disabled three of them, and while some of the tanks' crewmen were able to escape the flames, several of them were bayoneted and killed by the Japanese. One tank tumbled down an embankment into the Tenaru River, drowning its crew.

At 23:00 on 14 September, the remnants of the Kuma battalion conducted another attack on the same portion of the Marine lines, but were repulsed. A final "weak" attack by the Kuma unit on the evening of 15 September was also defeated.

Oka's unit of about 650 men attacked the Marines at several locations on the west side of the Lunga perimeter. At about 04:00 on 14 September, two Japanese companies attacked positions held by the 3rd Battalion, 5th Marine Regiment (3/5) near the coast and were thrown back with heavy losses. Another Japanese company captured a small ridge somewhat inland but was then pinned down by Marine artillery fire throughout the day and took heavy losses before withdrawing on the evening of 14 September. The rest of Oka's unit failed to find the Marine lines and did not participate in the attack.

== Aftermath ==
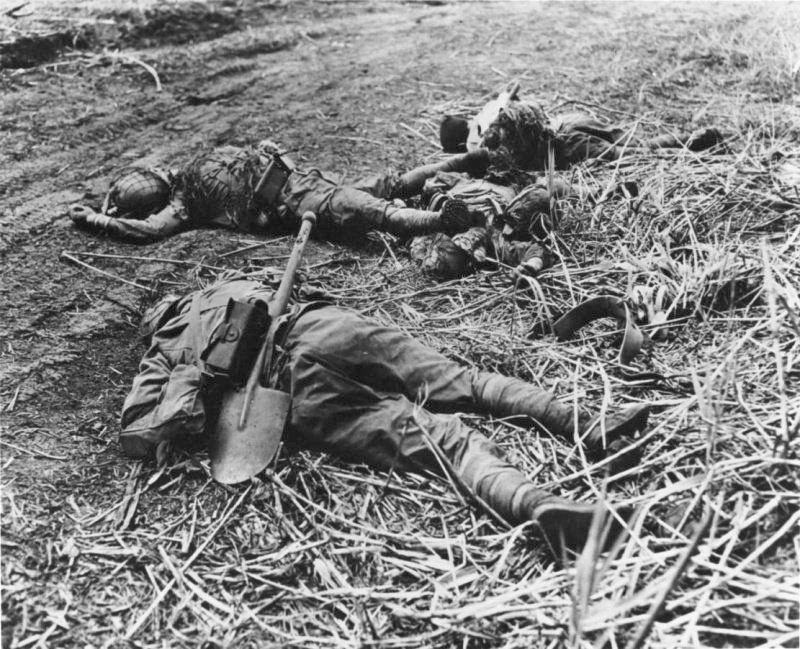
Dead Japanese soldiers lie on the ridge near Hill 123 after the battle.

At 13:05 on 14 September, Kawaguchi led the survivors of his shattered brigade away from the ridge and deeper into the jungle, where they rested and tended to their wounded all the next day. Kawaguchi's units were then ordered to withdraw west to the Matanikau River valley to join with Oka's unit, a 6 mi (9.7 km) march over difficult terrain. Kawaguchi's troops began the march on the morning of 16 September. Almost every soldier able to walk had to help carry the wounded. As the march progressed, the exhausted and hungry soldiers, who had eaten their last rations on the morning before their withdrawal, began to discard their heavy equipment and then their rifles. By the time most of them reached Oka's positions at Kokumbona five days later, only half still carried their weapons. The Kuma battalion's survivors, attempting to follow Kawaguchi's Center Body forces, became lost, wandered for three weeks in the jungle, and almost starved to death before finally reaching Kawaguchi's camp.

In total, Kawaguchi lost about 830 men in the attack, including 350 in Tamura's battalion, 200 in Kokusho's battalion, 120 in Oka's force, 100 in Mizuno's Kuma battalion, and 60 in Watanabe's battalion. An unknown number of wounded also died during the withdrawal march to the Matanikau. On and around the ridge, the Marines counted 500 Japanese dead, including 200 on the slopes of Hill 123. The Marines suffered between 104 and 111 killed between 12 and 14 September and hundreds wounded.

The Japanese attack was described by Smith as "having fared above any what a reasonable person could expect", the Japanese force was lacking in everything from basic necessities to armament, the lack of vehicles and artillery and the presence of those with the defenders in large quantities presenting insurmountable odds to the Japanese. Nevertheless, after a torrent of tenacious assaults, Kawaguchi's men managed to breach the Marine line and reach the outskirts of Henderson Field. Smith mentions that if even one additional battalion struck the ridge during the main assault, the pendulum could have swung in the Japanese's favor, with how close the fight was.

On 17 September, Vandegrift sent two companies from the 1st Battalion, 1st Marine Regiment to pursue the retreating Japanese. The Marines were ambushed by two Japanese companies acting as rear-guards for the withdrawal, and one Marine platoon was pinned down as the rest of the Marines retreated. The Marine company commander requested permission to attempt to rescue his platoon but was denied by Vandegrift. By nightfall, the Japanese overran and nearly annihilated the platoon, killing 24 Marines with only a few wounded members of the platoon surviving. On 20 September, a patrol from Edson's Raiders encountered stragglers from Kawaguchi's retreating column and called in artillery fire that killed 19 of them.

As the Japanese regrouped west of the Matanikau, the U.S. forces concentrated on shoring up and strengthening their Lunga defenses. On 14 September, Vandegrift moved another battalion, the 3rd Battalion, 2nd Marine Regiment, from Tulagi to Guadalcanal. On 18 September, an Allied naval convoy delivered 4,157 men from the 3rd Provisional Marine Brigade (the 7th Marine Regiment augmented by additional support units) to Guadalcanal. These reinforcements allowed Vandegrift—beginning on 19 September—to establish an unbroken line of defense around the Lunga perimeter. Vandegrift's forces' next significant clashes with the Japanese occurred along the Matanikau River from 23 to 27 September and 6–9 October.

== Significance ==
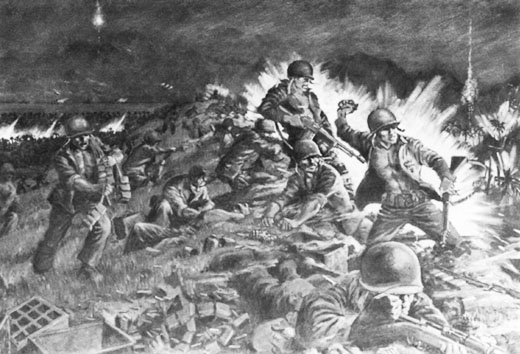
A painting by a Marine officer present during the Guadalcanal campaign depicts Marines defending Hill 123 during the battle.

On 15 September, General Hyakutake at Rabaul learned of Kawaguchi's defeat, the Imperial Japanese Army's first defeat involving a unit of this size in the war. The general forwarded the news to the Imperial General Headquarters in Japan. In an emergency session, the top Japanese army and navy command staffs concluded that "Guadalcanal might develop into the decisive battle of the war." The results of the battle began to have a telling strategic effect on Japanese operations in other areas of the Pacific. Hyakutake realized that in order to send sufficient troops and materiel to defeat the Allied forces on Guadalcanal, he could no longer support the major Japanese offensive on the Kokoda Track in New Guinea. Hyakutake—with the concurrence of the General Headquarters—ordered his troops on New Guinea, who were within 30 mi (48 km) of their objective of Port Moresby—to withdraw until the Guadalcanal matter was resolved. The Japanese were never able to restart their drive towards Port Moresby; the defeat at Edson's Ridge contributed not only to Japan's defeat in the Guadalcanal campaign, but also to Japan's ultimate defeat throughout the South Pacific.

After delivering more forces during the next month the Japanese mounted a major ground offensive on Guadalcanal, led by Hyakutake, in late October 1942 at the Battle for Henderson Field, but it resulted in an even more decisive defeat for the Japanese. Vandegrift later stated that Kawaguchi's assault on the ridge in September was the only time during the entire campaign he had doubts about the outcome and that had it succeeded, "we would have been in a pretty bad condition." Historian Richard B. Frank adds, "The Japanese never came closer to victory on the island itself than in September 1942, on a ridge thrusting up from the jungle just south of the critical airfield, best known ever after as Bloody Ridge."

Today, at the Marine Corps Recruit Depot San Diego, enlisted recruits finish their training with the 54-hour final exam called "The Crucible". In the final stage, recruits scale a 700 feet (210 m) mountain dubbed The Reaper. At the peak, Edson's Medal of Honor citation is displayed. The recruits read and are addressed about it. They are then awarded their Eagle, Globe and Anchor emblems by their senior drill instructors, signifying them as full-fledged Marines.
