= John W. Speakman =

American lawyer and politician from Illinois (1900–1942)

John William Speakman (March 5, 1900 – June 7, 1942) was an American lawyer and politician.

Speakman was born in Vermillion County, Illinois. He went to the Danville, Illinois public schools and to the Danville High School. Speakman graduated from the University of Illinois Law School and was admitted to the Illinois bar in 1925. He practiced law in Danville, Illinois and as served as an assistant United States Attorney for the Eastern District of Illinois. Speakman was involved with the Republican. He served in the Illinois House of Representatives from 1937 to 1941. He then served in the Illinois Senate from 1941 until his death in 1942. Speakman and another man drowned in a boating accident in a small lake near the Kickapoo State Recreation Area.
