= Aoba Detachment (Imperial Japanese Army) =

WWII Japanese unit led by Nasu

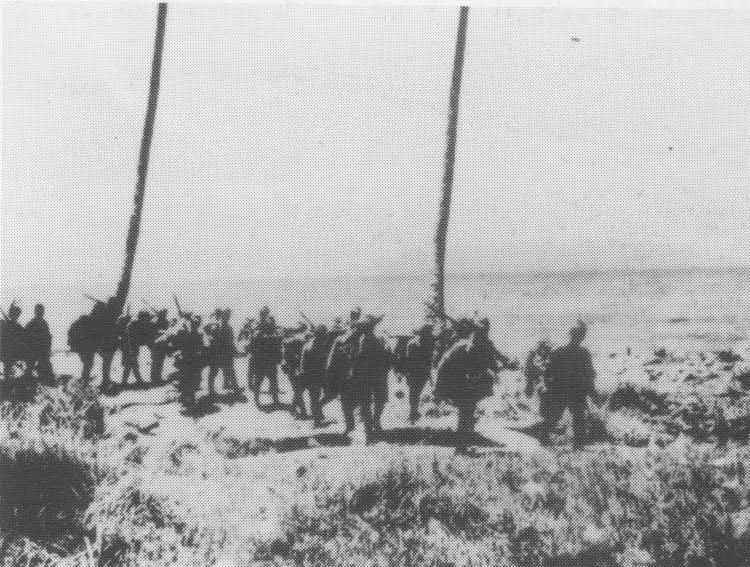

Aoba Detachment (Japanese: 青葉支隊) was the reinforced 4th Infantry Regiment/IJA 2nd Division, a part of the Seventeenth Army. The commander of the Aoba Detachment was Major General Yumio Nasu, the commander of the 2nd Division's Infantry Group. Unlike other detachments which were usually named after their commander, the Aoba Detachment is thought to have been named after Mount Aoba in Sendai, hometown of the 4th Infantry Regiment.

== Overview ==
The commander of the Seventeenth Army, Lt. Gen. Haruyoshi Hyakutake, was ordered to attack New Caledonia, Fiji, Samoa, and Port Moresby in order "to cut off communications between America and Australia." Aoba Detachment was to land at Port Moresby, New Guinea, as soon as the Midway - Aleutians victory was won.

Upon learning of the American landings on Guadalcanal, Imperial General Headquarters on August 10, 1942, ordered the Aoba Detachment undergoing training with the Fourteenth Army to join the Seventeenth Army under General Hyakutake. Three days later, orders were issued to recapture both Guadalcanal and Tulagi, in addition to carrying out the Port Moresby Operation.

The advance echelon of the Aoba Detachment, reached Rabaul on 31 August, and was considered for use as reinforcements in the Battle of Milne Bay until Admiral Gunichi Mikawa concluded the situation was hopeless and ordered Milne Bay evacuated.

Aoba Detachment was originally intended for the Port Moresby Operation, but was diverted to Guadalcanal. By September 4, the Aoba Detachment's three infantry battalions had landed on Guadalcanal. On the night of September 13 a second assault was launched against Henderson Field, involving the main force of the Kawaguchi Detachment and the remainder of the Ichiki Detachment. At the beginning of October the IJA 2nd Division began to arrive at Guadalcanal and absorbed the remains of the Aoba Detachment.

== Sources ==
- Milner, Samuel, United States Army in World War II, The War in the Pacific, Victory in Papua

OFFICE OF THE CHIEF OF MILITARY HISTORY, DEPARTMENT OF THE ARMY, WASHINGTON, D.C., 1957.
