= Senator Meier =

Senator Meier may refer to:

- Bill Meier (born 1940), Texas State Senate
- Curt Meier (born 1953), Wyoming State Senate
- Raymond A. Meier (born 1952), New York State Senate

== See also ==
- Robert W. Miers (1848–1930), Indiana State Senate
- Senator Mayer (disambiguation)
- Senator Meyer (disambiguation)
