= Julian Pearl =

American football player (born 1999)

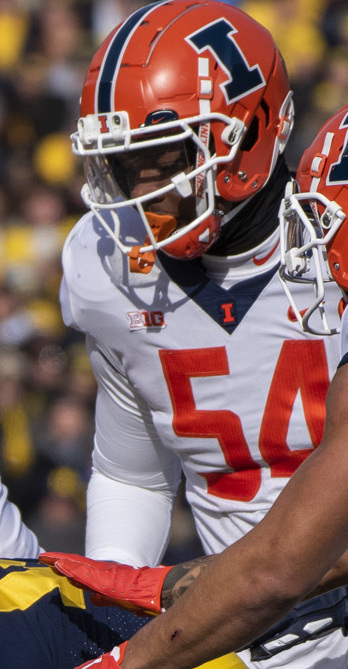
- Pearl with Illinois in 2022

Ottawa Redblacks
- Position: Offensive tackle
- Roster status: Active
- CFL status: American

Personal information
- Born: October 6, 1999 (age 27); Silvis, Illinois, U.S.
- Listed height: 6 ft 6 in (1.98 m)
- Listed weight: 305 lb (138 kg)

Career information
- High school: Danville
- College: Illinois (2018–2023)
- NFL draft: 2024: undrafted

Career history
- Baltimore Ravens (2024)*; Minnesota Vikings (2024)*; Cleveland Browns (2024)*; Pittsburgh Steelers (2025)*; Hamilton Tiger-Cats (2026)*; Ottawa Redblacks (2026–present)
- * Offseason or practice squad member only
- Stats at Pro Football Reference

Julian Pearl (born October 6, 1999) is an American professional football offensive tackle for the Ottawa Redblacks of the Canadian Football League (CFL). He played college football at Illinois.

== Early life ==
Pearl attended high school at Danville. Coming out of high school, Pearl initially committed to play for the Northern Illinois Huskies. However, Pearl flipped his commitment to play for the Illinois Fighting Illini.

== College career ==
In Pearl's first season in 2018, he decided to redshirt and played in two games as a defensive end. During the 2019 season, Pearl played in just two games. In the 2020 Covid-shortened season, Pearl played in seven games where he made four starts. During the 2021 season, Pearl played in 12 games with 11 starts at left guard. During the 2022 season, Pearl was a part of a Fighting Illini offensive line that were semifinalists for the Joe Moore Award. During the 2022 season, Pearl started 12 games for the Fighting Illini, where he was named an honorable mention all Big-Ten selection. Heading into the 2023 season, Pearl was named preseason second-team all Big-Ten. In 2023, Pearl would play in and start all 12 games for the Fighting Illini.

== Professional career ==
Pre-draft measurables
Height	Weight	Arm length	Hand span	40-yard dash	10-yard split	20-yard split	20-yard shuttle	Three-cone drill	Vertical jump	Broad jump	Bench press
6 ft 6 in (1.98 m)	312 lb (142 kg)	35 1/8 in (0.89 m)	10 1/4 in (0.26 m)	5.30 s	1.95 s	3.00 s	4.77 s	8.20 s	40.0 in (1.02 m)	8 ft 9 in (2.67 m)	20 reps
All values from NFL Combine/Pro Day

=== Baltimore Ravens ===
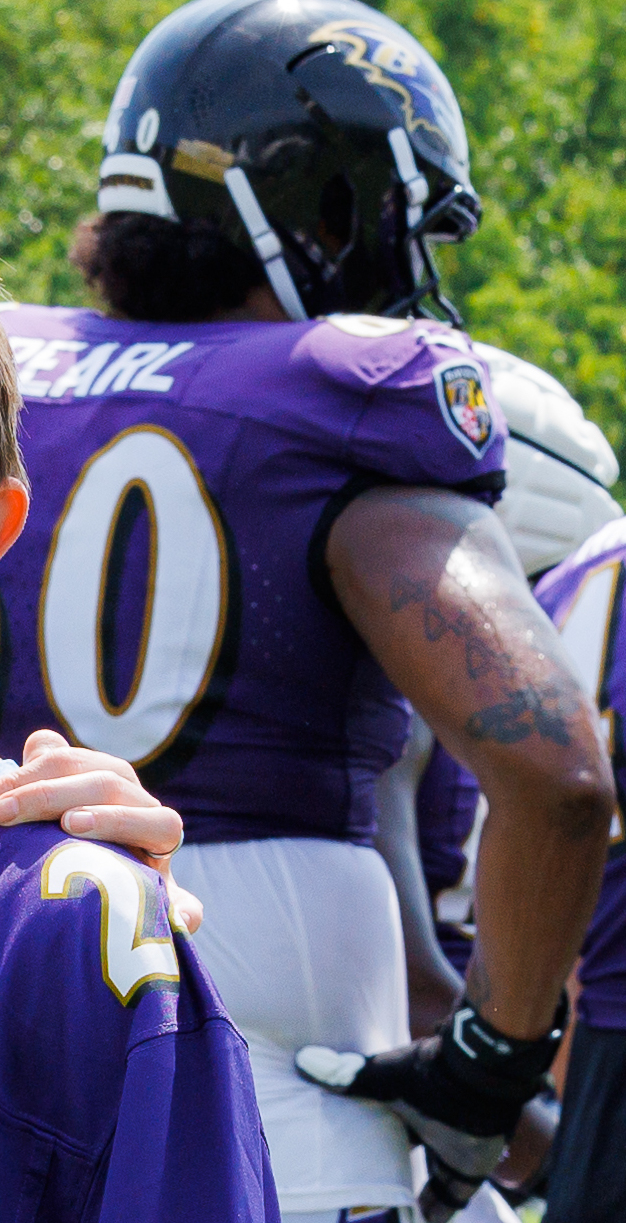
Pearl with the Baltimore Ravens in 2024

Pearl signed with the Baltimore Ravens as an undrafted free agent on May 3, 2024. He was also selected by the Michigan Panthers as the sixth overall selection in the 2024 UFL draft on July 17. He was waived on August 27.

=== Minnesota Vikings ===
On October 29, 2024, the Minnesota Vikings signed Pearl to their practice squad. He was released on November 29.

=== Cleveland Browns ===
On December 10, 2024, the Cleveland Browns signed Pearl to their practice squad. He signed a reserve/future contract with Cleveland on January 6, 2025. On August 4, Pearl was waived by the Browns.

=== Pittsburgh Steelers ===
On August 18, 2025, Pearl signed with the Pittsburgh Steelers. However, Pearl was released by the Steelers on August 24.

=== Michigan Panthers ===
On September 17, 2025, Pearl signed with the Michigan Panthers of the United Football League (UFL).

=== Hamilton Tiger-Cats ===
On March 19, 2026, Pearl signed with the Hamilton Tiger-Cats of the Canadian Football League (CFL). He was released on May 31 as part of final roster cuts.

=== Ottawa Redblacks ===
On June 15, 2026, Pearl signed with the Ottawa Redblacks.
