= Senator Mayer =

Senator Mayer may refer to:

- Charles F. Mayer (1795–1864), Maryland State Senate
- George A. Mayer (1917–2000), Wisconsin State Senate
- Jerome Mayer (1931–2024), South Dakota State Senate
- Robert Mayer (politician) (born 1957), Missouri State Senate
- Shelley Mayer (born 1952), New York State Senate
- Stephen F. Mayer (1854–1935), Wisconsin State Senate

== See also ==
- Senator Meyer (disambiguation)
- Senator Meier (disambiguation)
