= James Vrentas =

American chemical engineer (1936–2025)

- Born: James Spiros Vrentas; April 14, 1936; Danville, Illinois, U.S.
- Died: August 7, 2025 (aged 89); State College, Pennsylvania, U.S.
- Education: University of Illinois Urbana-Champaign; University of Delaware
- Occupation: Chemical engineer
- Spouse: Christine Jarzebski (m. 1975)

James Spiros Vrentas (April 14, 1936 – August 7, 2025) was an American chemical engineer.

== Life and career ==
Vrentas was born in Danville, Illinois, the son of Spiros Vrentas and Evantia Gintonis. He attended Danville High School, graduating in 1954. After graduating, he attended the University of Illinois Urbana-Champaign, earning his Bachelor of Science degree in 1958. He also attended the University of Delaware, earning his master's degree in 1961 and his PhD degree in chemical engineering in 1963.

Vrentas served as a professor in the department of chemical engineering at Pennsylvania State University from 1980 to 2016. During his years as a professor, in 1985, he was named the Dow Professor of Chemical Engineering.

== Personal life and death ==
In 1975, Vrentas married Christine Jarzebski. Their marriage lasted until Vrentas's death in 2025.

Vrentas died in State College, Pennsylvania, on August 7, 2025, at the age of 89.
