= 3rd Battalion, 11th Marines =

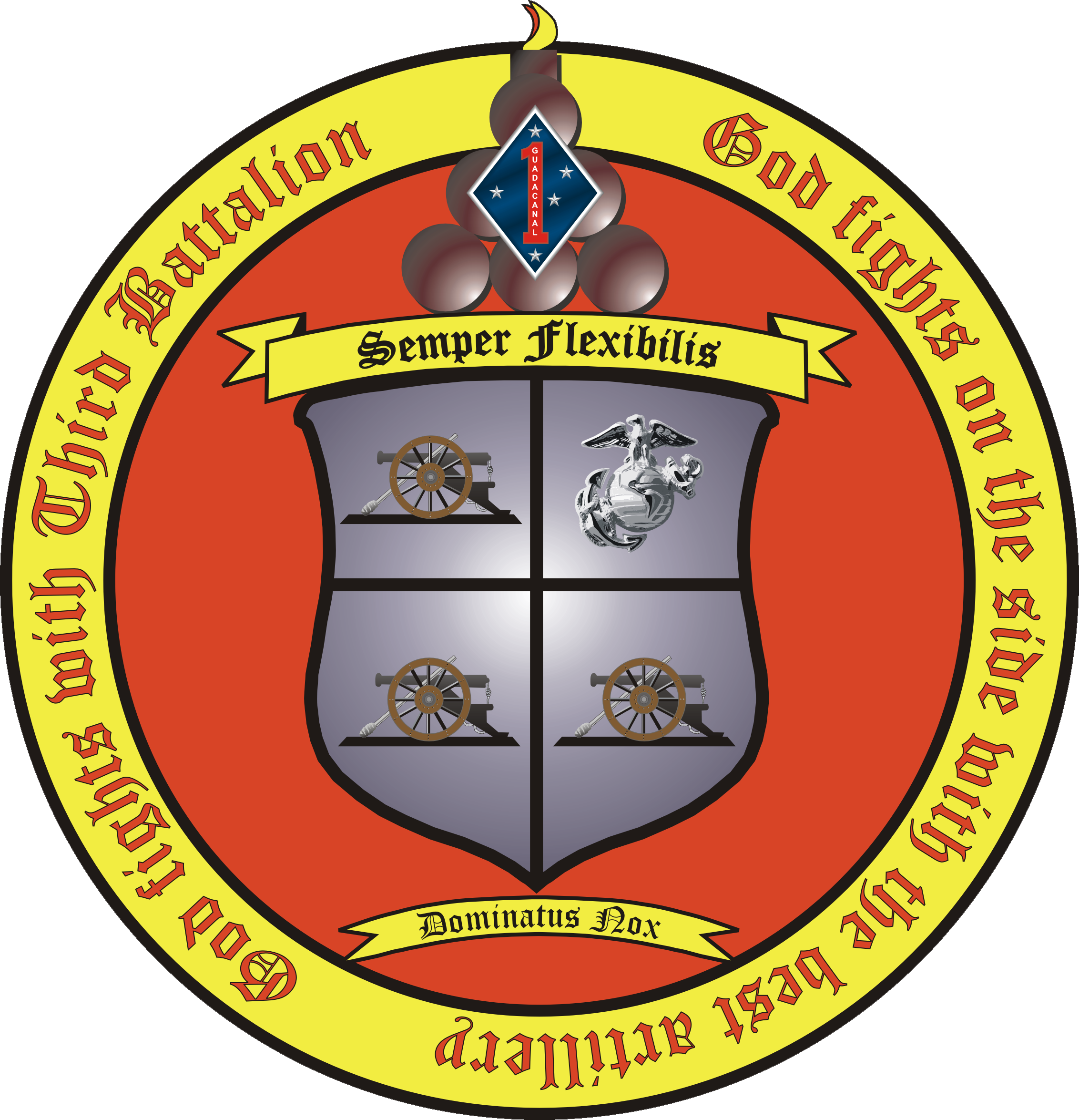
- 3/11 Insignia
- Active: 1 May 1943 – 30 September 1947; 20 August 1950 – present
- Country: United States of America
- Branch: United States Marine Corps
- Type: Artillery
- Role: Provide fires in support of 1st Marine Division
- Size: 800
- Part of: 11th Marine Regiment; 1st Marine Division
- Garrison/HQ: Marine Corps Air Ground Combat Center Twentynine Palms
- Nickname: "Thunder"
- Mottos: "Semper Flexibilis" and "Dominatus Nox"
- Engagements: World War II: Battle of Guadalcanal; Battle of Cape Gloucester; Battle of Peleliu; Battle of Okinawa; Korean War: Battle of Inchon; Battle of Chosin Reservoir; Vietnam War; Operation Desert Storm; Operation Restore Hope; War on terror: Operation Iraqi Freedom; Operation Enduring Freedom

Commanders
- Commanding Officer: LtCol Dwayne M. Littlejohn
- Sergeant Major: SgtMaj Mitchell Brown
- Notable commanders: James J. Keating

3rd Battalion, 11th Marines (3/11) is an artillery battalion comprising three firing batteries, a Liaison Unit, and a headquarters battery. The battalion is based at the Marine Corps Air Ground Combat Center Twentynine Palms, California and its primary weapon system is the M777 lightweight howitzer with a maximum effective range of 25 miles. They fall under the 11th Marine Regiment and the 1st Marine Division.

== Mission ==
Provide direct support fires to 7th Marine Regiment, and general support and reinforcing fires to other maneuver elements of 1st Marine Division during combat operations. That support may come in the traditional fashion of artillery support to maneuver forces, or by providing batteries to serve as provisional rifle companies. They also have the secondary mission of being the primary providers of civil-military operations (CMO). CMO is defined as the activities of the commander that establish, maintain, influence, or exploit relations between military organizations, Government and civilian organizations and the civilian populace.

== Current units ==
- Headquarters Battery

Commanded by Major John Maerling

- Battery I (India Battery)

Commanded by Major Scott Roberts

- Battery K (Kilo Battery)

Commanded by Major Damian David

- Battery M (Mike Battery)

Commanded by Captain Frank Africano

- Liaison Section (Fire Support Battery) No longer exists due to Force Design and creation of Fire Support Battalions

== History ==
=== World War II ===
3rd Battalion 11th Marines was activated 1 May 1943 in the state of Victoria, Australia as the 5th Battalion, 11th Marines, 1st Marine Division, Fleet Marine Force. The Battalion was redesignated 3rd Battalion, 11th Marines on 7 May 1944. During World War II, 3/11 participated in the Eastern New Guinea, Battle of New Britain, Battle of Peleliu, Battle of Guadalcanal and the Battle of Okinawa. Following World War II, Third Battalion participated in the occupation of North China from September 1945 to January 1947. In December 1946, the battalion was attached to the 7th Marines. The battalion was relocated to Marine Corps Base Camp Pendleton, California in January 1947 and was assigned to the 3rd Marine Brigade. The battalion was deactivated on 30 September 1947.

=== Korean War ===
3/11 was reactivated on 20 August 1950 at Camp Pendleton and was assigned to the 1st Marine Division, FMF. The battalion deployed in September 1950 to Kobe, Japan and participated in the Korean War, operating from Inchon, Seoul, the Chosin Reservoir, the East, Central, and Western Fronts. Third Battalion participated in the defense of the Korean Demilitarized Zone from July 1953 to February 1955. The battalion was relocated to Camp Pendleton in February 1955.

=== Vietnam War ===
In May 1965, Third Battalion was attached to Regimental Landing Team Seven and deployed to the Western Pacific. The battalion was assigned to the 3rd Marine Division in June 1965 and was later reassigned to the 1st Marine Division in March 1966 to October 1970, the battalion participated in the war in Vietnam, operating from Chu Lai, Da Nang, Dai Loc, and Hoi An. Third Battalion relocated to Camp Pendleton in October 1970 and was assigned to the Fifth Marine Amphibious Brigade. The battalion was reassigned in April 1971 to the First Marine Division, FMF.

=== The Gulf War and the 1990s ===
Third Battalion relocated to its current home at the Marine Corps Air Ground Combat Center Twentynine Palms, California in February 1990. The battalion participated in Operation Desert Shield and Operation Desert Storm in Southwest Asia from August 1990 to March 1991.

From December 1992 to April 1993, the battalion was deployed as a Provisional Infantry Battalion to Mogadishu, Somalia for Operation Restore Hope. While in Somalia the battalion was instrumental in coordinating security for the city of Mogadishu with 12 other nations. On 20 January 1993, Pfc. Domingo Arroyo of Headquarters Battery was killed in an ambush while on patrol in Mogadishu. He was the first casualty of Operation Restore Hope.

=== Global war on terror ===
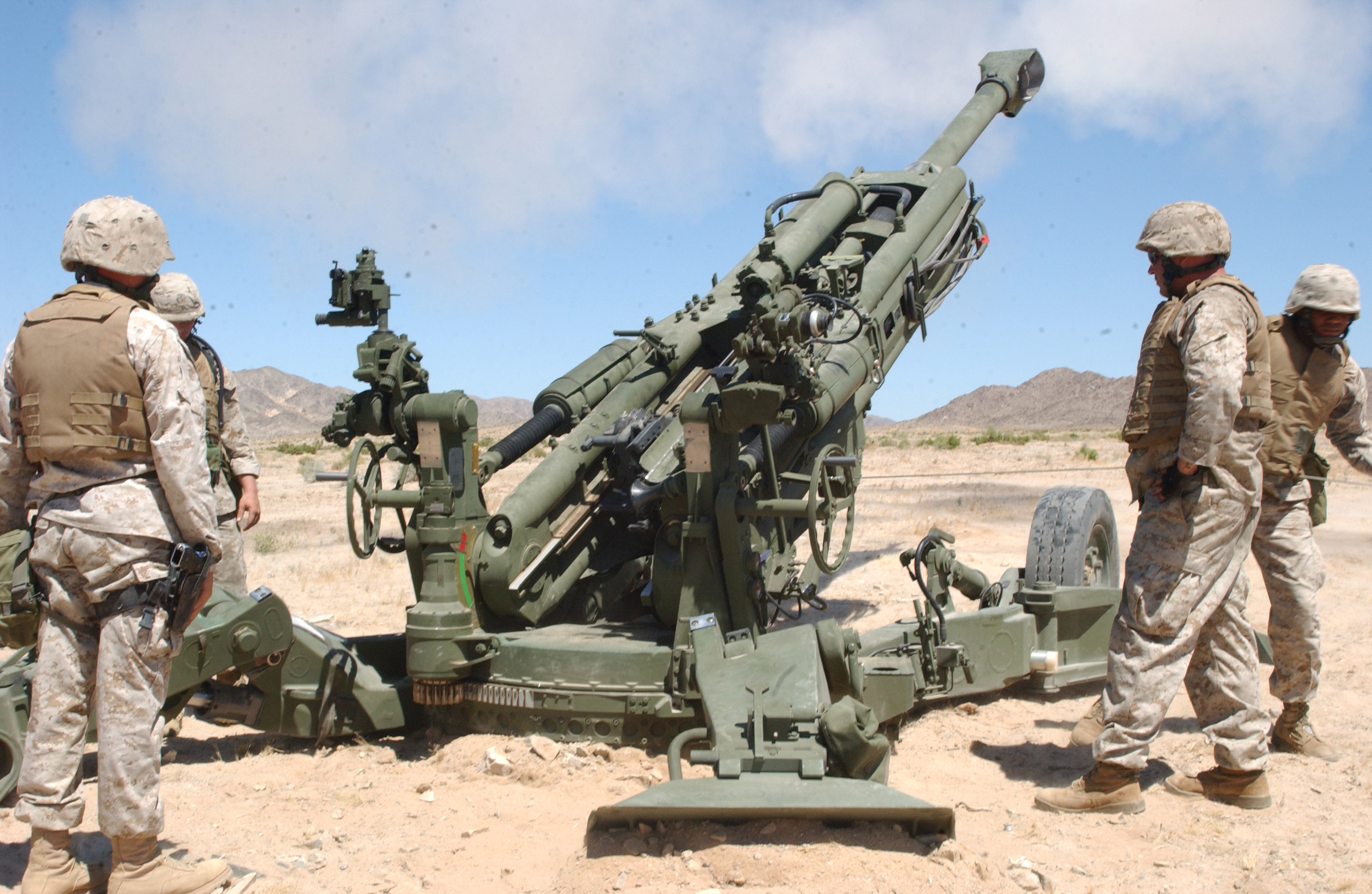
Artillerymen with Gun 3, Battery K, 3rd Battalion, 11th Marine Regiment fire-off a round with the newly fielded M777 Medium-weight 155-millimeter Howitzer

The battalion once again deployed to Southwest Asia from January 2003 to July 2003 to support the 1st Marine Expeditionary Force (I MEF) in Operation Iraqi Freedom. The battalion's timely and accurate fires proved to be crucial in allowing I MEF to quickly move deep into Iraqi territory and topple the regime in 21 days of major combat operations. Immediately following the fall of Baghdad, the battalion assumed the mission of a Provisional Infantry Battalion and begun assisting in civil/military duties as well as conducting Security and Stability Operation (SASO) patrols in the capital city, securing hospitals and other vital infrastructure.

In November 2003 the battalion again received orders to deploy to Iraq, but this time as a Provisional Military Police Battalion. The battalion quickly transitioned into its new job and deployed from February 2004 to September 2004. The battalion's motto of Semper Flexibils, Always Flexible, held true with the battalion participating in missions ranging from convoy escorts, combat patrols, humanitarian assistance, security force training, and controlling a battle space of over 40,000 square kilometers.

In May 2005, the battalion became the first unit in the world to field the new M777 lightweight howitzer. Feedback from the artillerymen of 3/11 led to modifications prior to being issued to other Marine and Army units.

Currently, the battalion supports OIF by deploying individual batteries to fulfill the role of artillery support, as well as provisional MP; as well as supporting III MEF in Okinawa, Japan with the Unit Deployment Program by deploying a battery semi-annually.

3/11 deployed to southern Afghanistan in the spring of 2009 as part of the 2nd Marine Expeditionary Brigade. They are part of the 17,000 troop increase announced by President Obama in mid-February. 3/11 operated as part of Regimental Combat Team 3 and was the only Marine artillery battalion in Afghanistan. The battalion built Fiddler's Green in July 2009 as a fire base for Operation Strike of the Sword.

== See also ==
- List of United States Marine Corps battalions
- Organization of the United States Marine Corps
