= James J. Keating =

United States Marine Corps general

James Joseph Keating
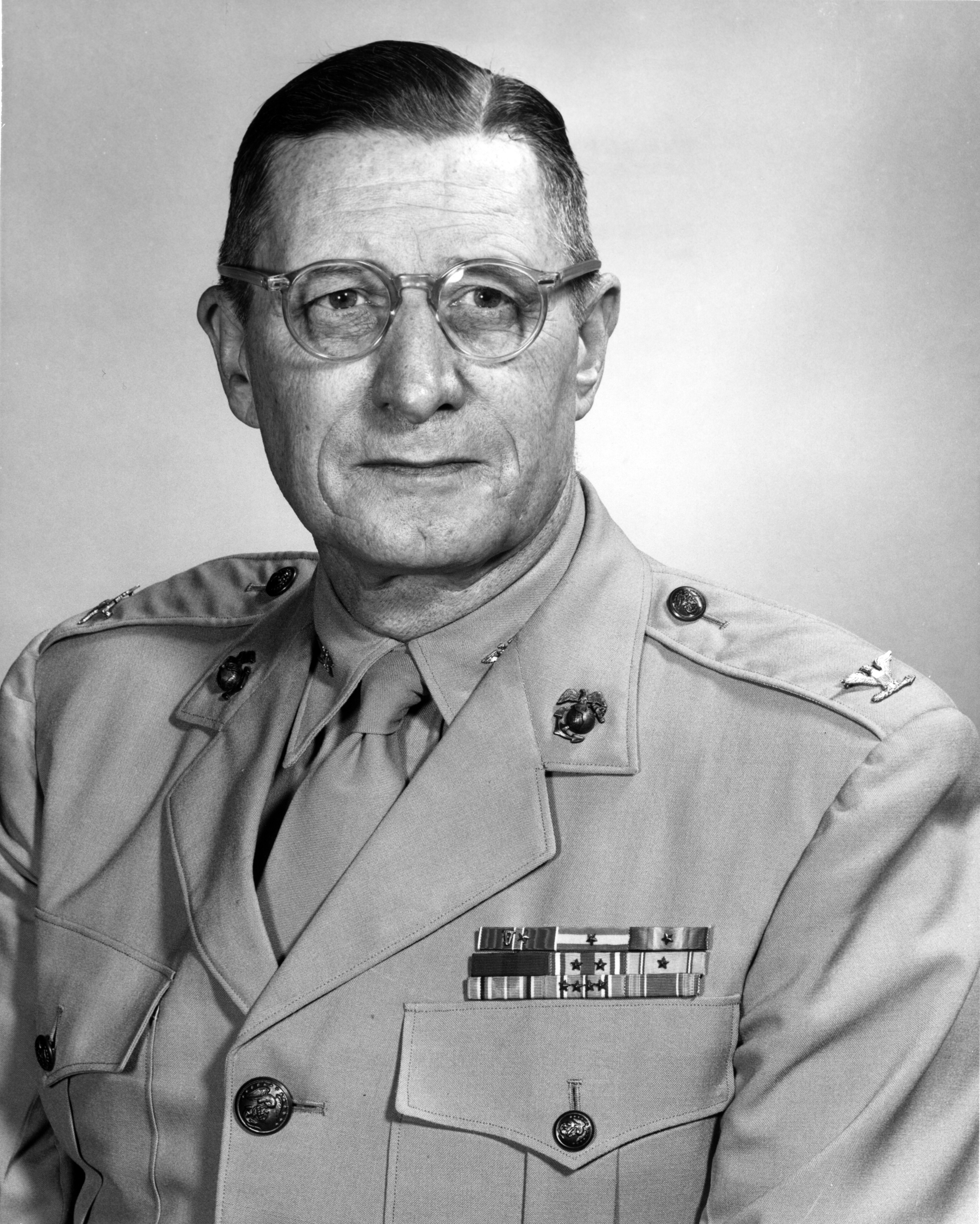
- James J. Keating as colonel, USMC
- Born: April 20, 1895; Castroville, California, US
- Died: December 18, 1978 (aged 83); Bethesda, Maryland, US
- Burial place: Arlington National Cemetery
- Military career
- Allegiance: United States
- Branch: United States Marine Corps
- Service years: 1917–1919, 1940–1955
- Rank: Brigadier general
- Commands: Administrative Division, HQMC; Intelligence Section, HQMC; 3rd Battalion, 11th Marines
- Conflicts: World War I World War II: Battle of Guadalcanal; Battle of Edson's Ridge; Bougainville Campaign; Battle of Cape Gloucester; Recapture of Guam
- Awards: Bronze Star Medal (2); Marine Corps Good Conduct Medal

James Joseph Keating (April 20, 1895 – December 18, 1978) was a United States Marine Corps officer with the rank of brigadier general, who is most noted as commanding officer of the 3rd Battalion, 11th Marines during the Battle of Guadalcanal and later as officer in charge of the Intelligence Section, Headquarters Marine Corps.

== Early years ==
Keating was born on April 20, 1895, in Castroville, California, and, after attending of school in Boston, he enrolled at Harvard Law School, where he graduated in 1917. He subsequently enlisted in the Marine Corps on May 19, 1917. Keating rose to the rank of sergeant and was decorated with the Marine Corps Good Conduct Medal for his enlisted service. He attended Officer Candidates School at Marine Barracks Quantico, Virginia, and was commissioned second lieutenant in the Marine Corps Reserve on July 15, 1918.

His next assignment was with 1st Marine Regiment, with which he sailed for Guantanamo Bay, Cuba. Keating was stationed at Cuba for four months and returned to United States in March 1919. He received an honorable discharge in April 1919 and was promoted to the rank of first lieutenant.

Following his discharge, Keating worked in the printing and publishing business in Philadelphia, before he rejoined Marine Corps Reserve in August 1930 as first lieutenant. He was assigned to the reserve 1st Battalion, 21st Marine Regiment, and his assignments included intelligence officer, operations officer, executive officer and later also commanding officer. For his reserve service, Keating was decorated with the Reserve Good Conduct Medal with two stars.

== World War II ==
Keating was recalled to the active duty with the Marine Corps in November 1940 with the rank of major and assigned to the Marine Corps Recruit Depot Parris Island, South Carolina. He was transferred to Guantanamo Bay, Cuba, in January 1941 and was assigned to 1st Marine Division under the command of Major General Holland Smith. Major Keating was subsequently appointed executive officer of 1st Battalion, 11th Marine Regiment under Colonel Pedro del Valle.

He participated with the regiment in subsequent maneuvers and was appointed commanding officer of the 3rd Battalion, 11th Marine Regiment in January 1942. Promoted to the rank of lieutenant colonel in May 1942, Keating sailed for the South Pacific in June of that year. He led his battalion during the Guadalcanal Campaign and also took part in Battle of Edson's Ridge, where his 105mm howitzers supported other marines forces. Keating was later decorated with the Bronze Star Medal with Combat "V" for his heroic achievement during operations against Japanese forces and also with the Navy Presidential Unit Citation.

The 11th Marine Regiment was sent to Australia for rest and refit in December 1942. Keating, who was already promoted to the rank of colonel on 5 November 1942, was appointed commanding officer of the 1st 155mm Howitzer Battalion attached to the III Amphibious Corps Artillery under Brigadier General Pedro del Valle. Keating led his unit during the Recapture of Guam in July 1944 and was decorated with a second Bronze Star Medal for his service there. He and his unit also received a second Navy Presidential Unit Citation.

Colonel Keating was transferred back to the United States in October 1944 and assigned to Intelligence Section within Headquarters Marine Corps. He was first appointed Section executive officer and later succeeded Colonel Edmond J. Buckley as section director in December 1944. Keating remained in this capacity until December 1945.

== Postwar career ==
During July 1945, Keating was commissioned in the regular Marine Corps and was appointed director of the Fourth Reserve District Headquarters in Philadelphia. He was later transferred to Hawaii, where he assumed command of Camp Catlin, where was stationed the Headquarters, Fleet Marine Force, Pacific. Keating also served simultaneously as assistant chief of staff and intelligence officer of Fleet Marine Force, Pacific.

He was transferred back to the United States in June 1949 and assigned to Marine Corps Base Quantico, where he was appointed legal officer and later officer in charge of local Marine Corps Schools. His final assignment came in September 1951, when he was appointed director, Administrative Division, Headquarters Marine Corps. Keating retired from the Marine Corps on June 30, 1955, and was advanced to the rank of brigadier general on the retired list for having been specially commended in combat.

Brigadier General James J. Keating died on December 18, 1978, and was buried at Arlington National Cemetery, Virginia, together with his wife Elizabeth C. Keating.

== Decorations ==
Here is the ribbon bar of Brigadier General James J. Keating:

1st Row	Bronze Star Medal with Combat "V" and one 5/16" Gold Star		Navy Presidential Unit Citation with one star	
2nd Row	Marine Corps Good Conduct Medal	Reserve Good Conduct Medal with two stars	World War I Victory Medal with West Indies clasp	American Defense Service Medal with Base Clasp
3rd Row	Asiatic-Pacific Campaign Medal with four3/16 service stars	American Campaign Medal	World War II Victory Medal	National Defense Service Medal
