= USS Kenneth D. Bailey =

Gearing-class destroyer

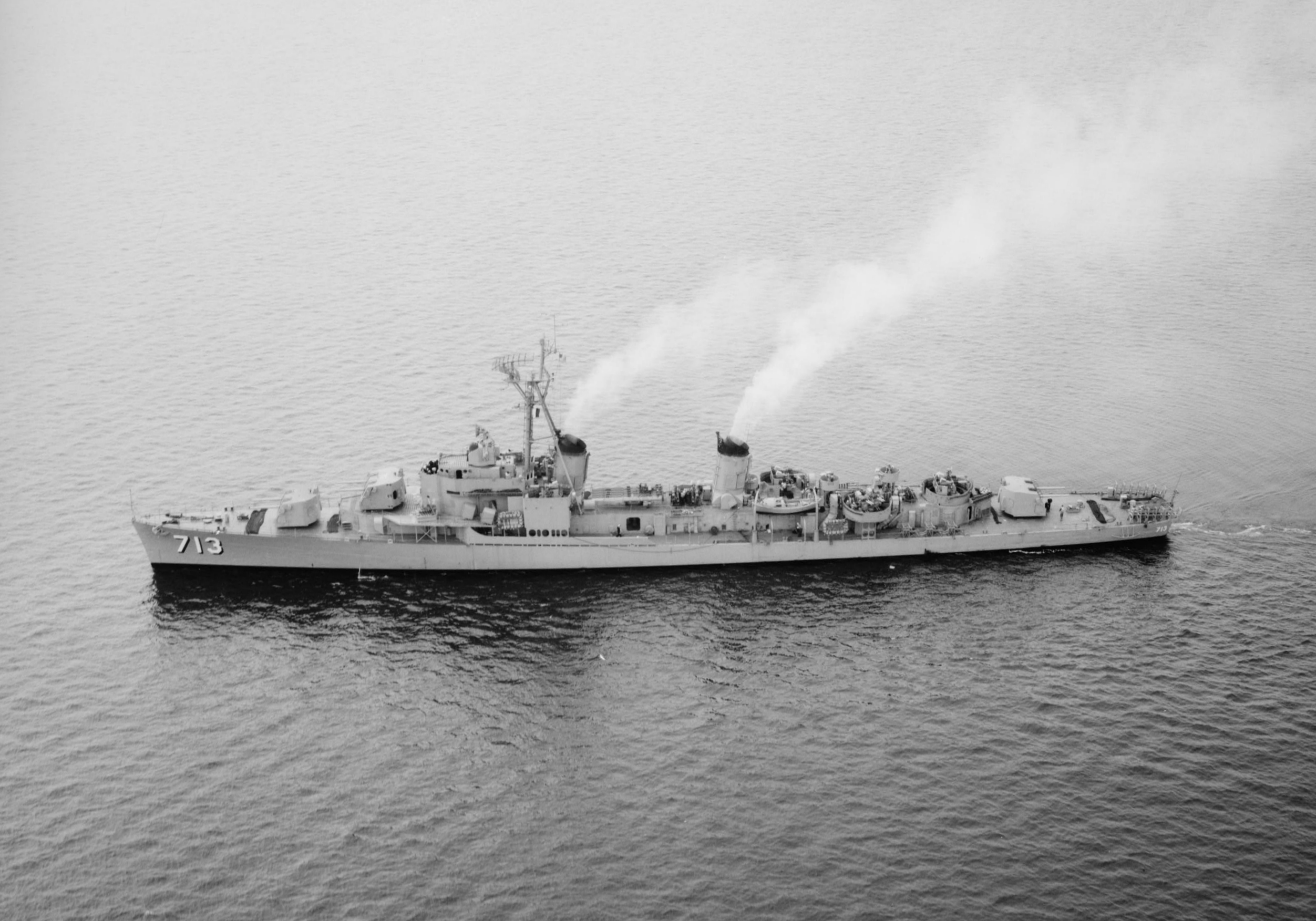
- USS Kenneth D. Bailey (DD-713) underway off the Boston Lighthouse on 26 September 1950

History

United States
- Name: USS Kenneth D. Bailey
- Namesake: Major Kenneth D. Bailey (1910-1942), a U.S. Marine Corps officer and Medal of Honor recipient
- Builder: Federal Shipbuilding & Drydock Company, Kearny, New Jersey
- Launched: 17 June 1945
- Commissioned: 31 July 1945
- Modernized: 27 October 1960 (FRAM II)
- Decommissioned: 20 January 1970
- Reclassified: DDR-713 (Radar Picket Destroyer), 9 April 1953
- Stricken: 1 February 1974
- Identification: Callsign: NTPC; Hull number: DDG-713
- Fate: Sold to Iran, 13 January 1975, to be broken up for spare parts

General characteristics
- Class & type: Gearing-class destroyer
- Displacement: 2,425 long tons (2,464 t)
- Length: 390 ft 6 in (119.02 m)
- Beam: 41 ft 1 in (12.52 m)
- Draft: 18 ft 6 in (5.64 m)
- Speed: 35 knots (65 km/h; 40 mph)
- Armament: 6 × 5"/38 caliber guns; 16 × 40 mm AA guns; 20 × 20 mm AA guns; 5 × 21 inch (533 mm) torpedo tubes; 6 × depth charge projectors; 2 × depth charge tracks

USS Kenneth D. Bailey (DD-713/DDR-713) was a Gearing-class destroyer in the United States Navy during World War II. She was named for Kenneth D. Bailey. The name Kenneth D. Bailey was originally assigned to the destroyer escort USS Kenneth D. Bailey (DE-552) on 30 November 1943; DE-552 was cancelled on 10 June 1944, and the name was reassigned to DD-713 on 8 July 1944.

Kenneth D. Bailey was launched on 17 June 1945 by Federal Shipbuilding & Drydock Company, Kearny, New Jersey; sponsored by Elizabeth Speissegger Bailey, widow of Major Bailey; and commissioned on 31 July 1945.

== Service history ==
=== Destroyer DD-713, 1945–1952 ===
After shakedown in the Caribbean, Kenneth D. Bailey operated in the Atlantic from the New England coast to the Caribbean. Working out of Newport, Rhode Island, and Norfolk, Virginia, she served as plane guard during the qualification of pilots in aircraft carrier operations and trained men for the crews of new destroyers. From 13 February to 26 March 1947 she cruised along the eastern coast of South America and returned to Norfolk 31 March.

On 10 November Kenneth D. Bailey departed Norfolk on the first of many Mediterranean Sea cruises during the Cold War. From 13 December to 5 January 1948, she patrolled the coast of Greece. While operating in the Mediterranean from 13 January to 12 May 1949, she supported the truce in Israel and helped to maintain peace between Italy and Yugoslavia during their struggle for Trieste. Again, from 3 September 1951 to 4 February 1952, she ranged the Mediterranean from Spain to Turkey to maintain the freedom of the nations which rim that ancient sea.

When not deployed with the 6th Fleet, Kenneth D. Bailey joined operations that carried her from the Caribbean and the reaches of the Arctic Ocean to the shores of Northern and Western Europe. Undertaking a variety of duties, she trained naval reservists, served as plane guard and screen during carrier operations, and participated in cold weather exercises north of the Arctic Circle. On 2 December 1952 she entered the Boston Naval Shipyard for modernization and conversion to a radar picket destroyer and decommissioned on the 22nd.

=== Radar picket destroyer DDR-713, 1953–1967 ===
Redesignated DDR-713, Kenneth D. Bailey recommissioned 29 August 1953. Based at Newport, she operated along the East Coast, then deployed with the 6th Fleet on 19 May 1954. Before returning to Newport on 28 September, she participated in joint NATO operations in the Eastern Mediterranean. She again deployed to the Mediterranean from 5 November 1955 to 17 March 1956, and in February 1956 she patrolled the Red Sea along Israeli and Egyptian coasts to express U.S. concern over the mounting Suez Crisis. In April 1957 she cruised the eastern Mediterranean in support of King Hussein's pro-Western Jordanian government. And while on her next deployment (2 September 1958 – 28 March 1959), she supported U.S. operations in Lebanon, begun in July 1958 at the request of Lebanese President Chamoun, who feared a Communist coup.

Kenneth D. Bailey shifted her homeport from Newport to Mayport, Florida, on 16 June 1959. After completing destroyer operations in the Atlantic, she entered Charleston Navy Yard on 26 January 1960 for a nine-month FRAM II overhaul that equipped her with new radar, sonar, and communication facilities. She returned to Mayport on 27 October. She sailed on 14 November for waters off Guatemala and Nicaragua to establish barrier patrols to prevent the landing of Cuban supplies and armed forces during revolts in those Central American nations. She continued this important duty until 4 December, then returned to Mayport on 18 December to prepare for further service in the Mediterranean.

Departing Mayport on 9 February 1961, Kenneth D. Bailey arrived at Gibraltar on 18 February to commence six months of Fleet and NATO operations that carried her from the coast of France to the shores of Greece, Turkey, and Lebanon. Since that time, she has deployed to the Mediterranean four times within four years to support the Fleet's peace-keeping mission. Returning from her latest deployment on 26 October 1966, this versatile destroyer remained off Mayport, until 12 April 1967 when she arrived at Charleston, South Carolina, for overhaul.

=== Disposal ===
Kenneth D. Bailey was decommissioned on 20 January 1970, struck on 1 February 1974, and subsequently sold to Iran on 13 January 1975 for spare parts.
