= Kenneth D. Bailey =

United States Marine Corps Medal of Honor recipient (1910–1942)

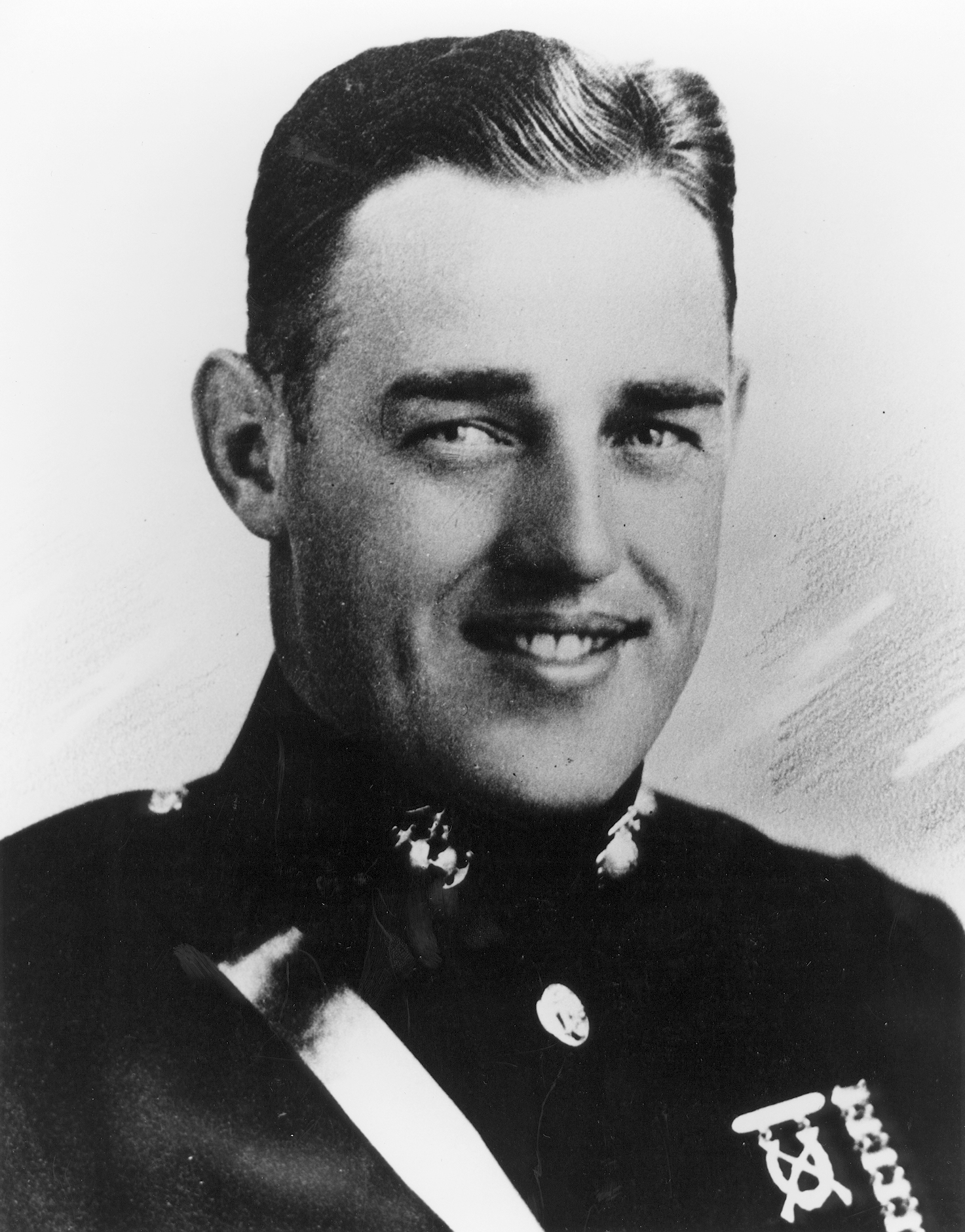
- Kenneth D. Bailey, Medal of Honor recipient
- Born: October 21, 1910; Pawnee, Oklahoma, US
- Died: September 26, 1942 (aged 31); Matanikau River, Guadalcanal, Solomon Islands
- Burial place: Spring Hill Cemetery; Danville, Illinois
- Military career
- Allegiance: United States of America
- Branch: United States Marine Corps
- Service years: 1932–1935 (National Guard); 1935–1942 (Marine Corps)
- Rank: Major
- Units: 130th Infantry Regiment, Illinois National Guard; 5th Marine Regiment; Marine Detachment, USS Pennsylvania (BB-38); Marine Corps Recruit Depot Parris Island; 1st Marine Brigade; 7th Marine Regiment; 1st Marine Regiment; 1st Marine Raider Battalion
- Conflicts: World War II: Guadalcanal Campaign; Battle of Tulagi (WIA); Battle of Edson's Ridge (WIA); Actions along the Matanikau †
- Awards: Medal of Honor; Silver Star; Purple Heart

Kenneth Dillon Bailey (October 21, 1910 – September 26, 1942) was a United States Marine Corps officer who posthumously received the Medal of Honor for heroic conduct during action during the Battle of Guadalcanal in the Solomon Islands. He also earned the Silver Star Medal during the initial landing on Tulagi in the Solomon Islands and the Purple Heart.

== Biography ==
Kenneth Dillon Bailey was born in Pawnee, Oklahoma, on October 21, 1910. He later moved to Danville, Illinois, with his parents. He spent three years with the 130th Infantry Regiment, Illinois National Guard, He graduated from the University of Illinois in 1935 and was an active member of the National Society of Pershing Rifles, later serving as second in command. He received his second lieutenant's commission in the Marine Corps on July 1, 1935. He was ordered to the Marine Barracks, Philadelphia, Pennsylvania, where he completed a course of instruction in the Basic School.

Joining the 5th Marine Regiment at Marine Corps Base Quantico, Virginia, he participated in maneuvers in San Diego, California, and in the Caribbean. In June 1938, he joined the Marine Detachment aboard the battleship USS Pennsylvania (BB-38) as Detachment and Battery Officer. He was advanced to first lieutenant on January 19, 1939, while serving on board Pennsylvania.

A short tour of duty at Quantico as Range Officer with the Rifle Range Detachment preceded his assignment as Assistant to the Training Officer, Marine Corps Recruit Depot Parris Island at Parris Island, South Carolina. First Lieutenant Bailey was ordered to Guantanamo Bay, Cuba, in December 1940 where he joined the 1st Marine Brigade. He later joined the 7th Marine Regiment, then the 1st Marine Regiment, which returned to Parris Island not long after he reported for duty. He was promoted to captain in March 1941.

At Quantico in June 1941, he joined the 5th Marine Regiment as a company commander. In February 1942, his unit was redesignated the 1st Marine Raider Battalion. The unit was ordered to Marine Corps Recruit Depot San Diego at San Diego, California, in April 1942, and on April 30, 1942, reached Tutuila, American Samoa. He was promoted to major on May 8, 1942.

During the invasion of Tulagi, Solomon Islands, at the beginning of the Guadalcanal Campaign on August 7, 1942, Captain Bailey led a successful assault against a Japanese machine gun nest. Although seriously wounded, he directed the action of his company until forcibly evacuated. For his "conspicuous gallantry and intrepidity," he was awarded the Silver Star for his actions on Tulagi.

Bailey later moved with his unit to Guadalcanal. As commanding officer of Company C, 1st Marine Raider Battalion, he led his men in repulsing a Japanese attack, which had penetrated American lines during the Battle of Edson's Ridge, 12 to September 14, 1942. Despite a severe head wound, he directed his men for more than 10 hours of fierce hand-to-hand combat. "His great personal valor while exposed to constant and merciless enemy fire, and his indomitable fighting spirit inspired his troops to heights of heroic endeavor which enabled them to repulse the enemy and hold Henderson Field."

Major Bailey was killed in action on September 26, 1942, while leading his men in an attack on the Japanese at the Matanikau River on Guadalcanal (see Actions along the Matanikau). He was buried on Guadalcanal, but his remains were reinterred in Spring Hill Cemetery, Danville, Illinois, in June 1948.

For his actions on Guadalcanal, Major Bailey was posthumously awarded the Medal of Honor.

== Awards and honors ==

Medal of Honor	Silver Star	Purple Heart with gold star
Combat Action Ribbon	Navy Presidential Unit Citation	American Defense Service Medal
American Campaign Medal	Asiatic-Pacific Campaign Medal with two battle stars	World War II Victory Medal

=== Medal of Honor citation ===
The President of the United States takes pleasure in presenting the CONGRESSIONAL MEDAL OF HONOR posthumously to

MAJOR KENNETH D. BAILEY
UNITED STATES MARINE CORPS

for service as set forth in the following CITATION:

For extraordinary courage and heroic conduct above and beyond the call of duty as Commanding Officer of Company C, First Marine Raider Battalion, during the enemy Japanese attack on Henderson Field, Guadalcanal, Solomon Islands, on September 12–13, 1942. Completely reorganized following the severe engagement of the night before, Major Bailey's company, within an hour after taking its assigned position as battalion reserve between the main line and the coveted airport, was threatened on the right flank by the penetration of the enemy into a gap in the main line. In addition to repulsing this threat, while steadily improving his own desperately held position, he used every weapon at his command to cover the forced withdrawal of the main line before a hammering assault by superior enemy forces. After rendering invaluable service to the Battalion Commander in stemming the retreat, reorganizing the troops and extending the reserve position to the left, Major Bailey, despite a severe head wound, repeatedly led his troops in fierce hand to hand combat for a period of ten hours. His great personal valor while exposed to constant and merciless enemy fire, and his indomitable fighting spirit inspired his troops to heights of heroic endeavor which enabled them to repulse the enemy and hold Henderson Field. He gallantly gave his life in the service of his country.

/S/FRANKLIN D. ROOSEVELT

=== Silver Star citation ===
Citation:

The President of the United States of America takes pleasure in presenting the Silver Star to Major Kenneth Dillon Bailey (MCSN: 0–5100), United States Marine Corps, for conspicuous gallantry and intrepidity while attached to the First Marine Raider Battalion during action against enemy Japanese forces on Tulagi, Solomon Islands, 7 August 1942. After the advance of his company had been stopped by concentrated machine gun and rifle fire, Major Bailey worked his way, with great difficulty, to the side of a Japanese dugout and attempted to remove it from the flank. With heroic and inspiring leadership, although severely wounded, he continued to direct the ensuing action of his company until he was forcibly evacuated, thereby contributing materially to the destruction of the machine gun nest and enabling his men to successfully carry out their mission. His dauntless courage and complete disregard for his own personal safety were in keeping with the highest traditions of the United States Naval Service.

=== Namesakes ===
The United States Navy destroyer escort USS Kenneth D. Bailey (DE-552) was named for Major Bailey. Her construction was cancelled in 1944.

In 1945, the U.S. Navy destroyer USS Kenneth D. Bailey (DD-713), in commission from 1945 to 1970, was named in his honor.

== See also ==
- List of Medal of Honor recipients for World War II
