= John P. Meyer =

American judge and politician

John P. Meyer Sr. (August 17, 1920 – October 31, 2013) was an American judge and politician.

Meyer was born in Danville, Illinois. He graduated from Danville High School in 1937. He received his bachelor's degree from the University of Notre Dame and his law degree from the Notre Dame Law School. He was admitted to the Illinois bar and practiced law in Danville. Meyer served in the United States Army during World War II. Meyer served in the Illinois House of Representatives from 1948 to 1952. He was a Republican. Meyer then served in the Illinois Senate from 1952 to 1962. Meyer served as an Illinois Circuit Court judge. He wrote a book: Observations of an Elderly Gentleman. Meyer raised and raced thoroughbred horses with his wife. He died in Danville, Illinois.
