= Mark J. O'Neil =

Retired US Army general (born 1964)

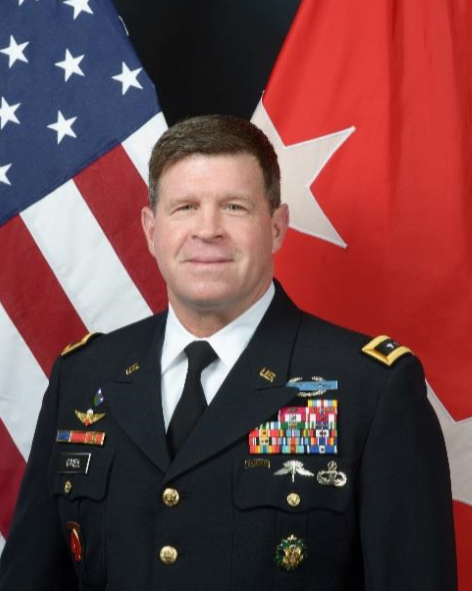
- O'Neil as CG of U.S. Army Alaska
- Born: June 12, 1964 (age 62); New York, United States
- Military career
- Allegiance: United States
- Branch: United States Army
- Service years: 1986–2019
- Rank: Major General
- Commands: United States Army Alaska; Delta Force
- Conflicts: Iraq War; War in Afghanistan
- Awards: Army Distinguished Service Medal; Defense Superior Service Medal; Legion of Merit (3); Bronze Star Medal (8)

Mark J. O'Neil (born June 12, 1964) is a retired United States Army major general who last served as the commander of U.S. Army Alaska. He previously served as the commanding officer of Delta Force from July 2, 2009 to August 2011. He has participated in numerous combat operations, such as; the wars in Iraq and Afghanistan. He assumed his final assignment on July 12, 2017, before retiring in 2019.

== Early life and education ==
Born in New York on June 12, 1964, O'Neil attended La Salle Institute in Troy and was selected for their Athletic Hall of Fame as a senior in 1982. O'Neil graduated from Norwich University on 28 May 1986, earning his commission as an Infantry Officer from Norwich University's Reserve Officer Training Corps. He was inducted into the Norwich University Athletic Hall of Fame in 1986 for winning the Distinguished Letterman Award in Football and Track & Field.

== Military career ==
O’Neil was commissioned as a second lieutenant on 28 May 1986. His first assignment was with 1st Battalion, 5th Cavalry Regiment, 1st Cavalry Division, Fort Hood. O'Neil served in staff and command positions for both army units and special operations organizations. He served as a battalion logistics officer and later rifle company commander with the 1st Battalion, 27th Infantry Regiment, 25th Infantry Division, Schofield Barracks, Hawaii. In April 1994, he joined the 3rd Battalion, 75th Ranger Regiment, Fort Benning, Georgia, where he served as a battalion training officer, assistant operations officer, and rifle company commander, and later as a liaison/plans officer with headquarters and headquarters company, 75th Ranger Regiment.

In 1998, O'Neil volunteered for and completed a specialized selection and then operator training course for assignment to 1st Special Forces Operational Detachment – Delta (1st SFOD-D), commonly known as "Delta Force", at Fort Bragg, North Carolina. He served as squadron operations officer, troop commander, selection and training commander, B Squadron commander from 2003 to 2004, deputy commander for operations, and finally as the commander of 1st SFOD-D from July 2009 to July 2011. He planned and executed training programs to prepare his unit for missions in sensitive environments requiring sophisticated tactics, techniques and procedures. He led his unit to conduct operations across the joint special operations environment. During this period, he also completed an assignment as the Chief, Current Operations Division for the Joint Special Operations Command. In that role, he synchronized and integrated all assigned ground, maritime, air, and lethal and nonlethal fires during training and operations.

From June 2011 to December 2012, O'Neil served as the executive officer to the chief of staff, United States Army. He then transitioned to Fort Drum, New York to serve as the Deputy Commanding General – Operations for 10th Mountain Division. In March 2015, he became the Deputy Commanding General – Training for the Combined Arms Center at Fort Leavenworth, Kansas. From 2016 to July 2017, he served as the chief of staff for United States Army Pacific at Fort Shafter, Hawaii. His culminating assignment was as the Commanding General of United States Army Alaska at Joint Base Elmendorf-Richardson, Alaska from July 2017 until July 2019.

His deployments include peacekeeping operations in Bosnia and 15 deployments in support of overseas contingency operations in Afghanistan for Operation Enduring Freedom and Iraq for Operation Iraqi Freedom and Operation New Dawn.

== Awards and decorations ==
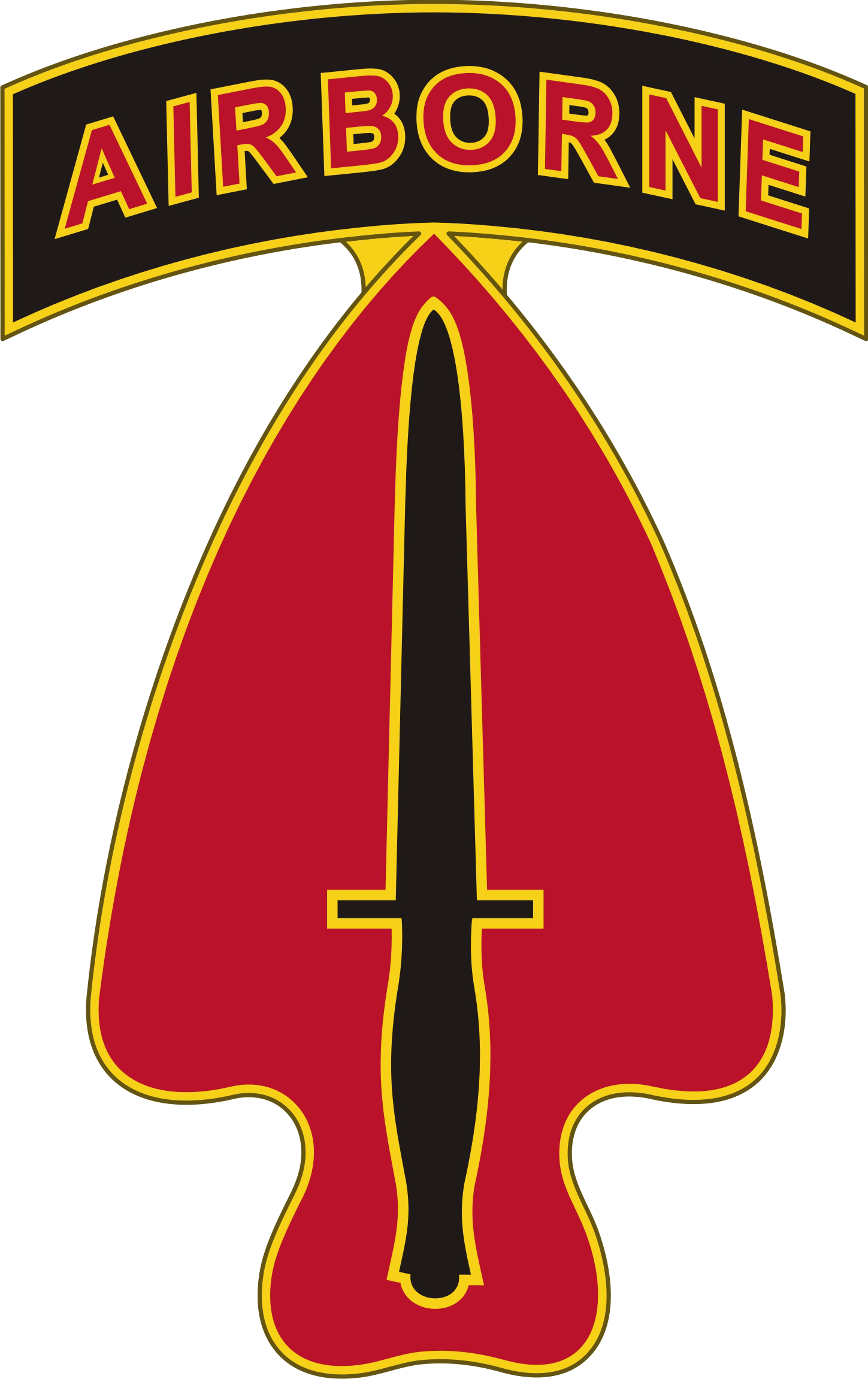
Combat Infantryman Badge
Expert Infantryman Badge
Combat Action Badge
Ranger tab
Military Free Fall Parachutist Badge
Master Parachutist Badge
Air Assault Badge
United States Army Special Operations Command Combat Service Identification Badge
Canadian Jump Wings (non-operational)
75th Ranger Regiment Distinctive Unit Insignia
12 Overseas Service Bars

Defense Superior Service Medal
Legion of Merit with two oak leaf clusters
Bronze Star Medal with "V" device and seven oak leaf clusters (1 award for Valor)
Defense Meritorious Service Medal
Meritorious Service Medal with oak leaf cluster
Joint Service Commendation Medal
Army Commendation Medal with two oak leaf clusters
Army Achievement Medal with three oak leaf clusters
Army Presidential Unit Citation with oak leaf cluster
Meritorious Unit Commendation
Superior Unit Award
National Defense Service Medal with one bronze service star
Armed Forces Expeditionary Medal with two service stars
Afghanistan Campaign Medal with two campaign stars
Iraq Campaign Medal with six campaign stars
Global War on Terrorism Expeditionary Medal
Global War on Terrorism Service Medal
Army Service Ribbon
Army Overseas Service Ribbon with bronze award numeral 4
NATO Medal for Kosovo with service star

== Dates of rank ==
Rank	Date
Second lieutenant	May 16, 1986
First lieutenant	November 28, 1987
Captain	January 1, 1991
Major	November 1, 1997
Lieutenant colonel	September 1, 2002
Colonel	November 1, 2007
Brigadier general	August 2, 2013
Major general	November 2, 2015

== In literature ==
O'Neils contributions as a battalion commander during the invasion of Iraq, during which he deployed forward of the invasion force with Delta Force, are captured in Michael R. Gordon and Bernard E. Trainor's book Cobra II: The Inside Story of the Invasion and Occupation of Iraq.
