= 11th Corps Signal Brigade =

Signal brigade of the III Armored Corps, US Army

- 11th Corps Signal Brigade Shoulder Sleeve Insignia
- Active: 1964–present
- Country: United States
- Branch: United States Army
- Type: Communications
- Role: Signals
- Size: Brigade
- Part of: III Armored Corps
- Garrison/HQ: Fort Hood
- Nickname: "Thunderbirds" (Special Designation)
- Mottos: "Flexibility, Dependability"
- Engagements: Operation Desert Storm; Operation Restore Hope; Operation Enduring Freedom; Operation Iraqi Freedom
- Decorations: Meritorious Unit Commendation

Commanders
- Commander: COL Eva A. Millare
- Command Sergeant Major: CSM Matthew A. Helmer

Insignia
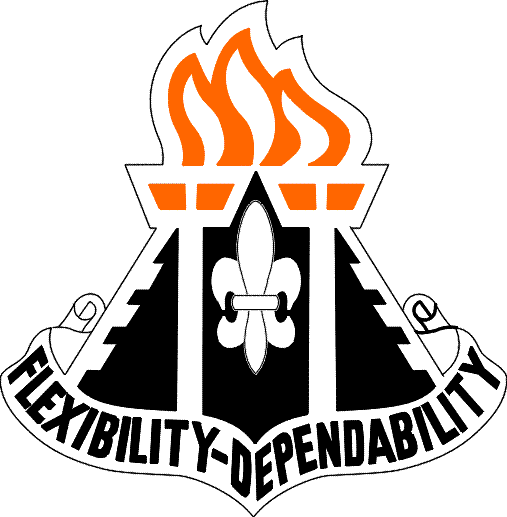
- Distinctive Unit Insignia

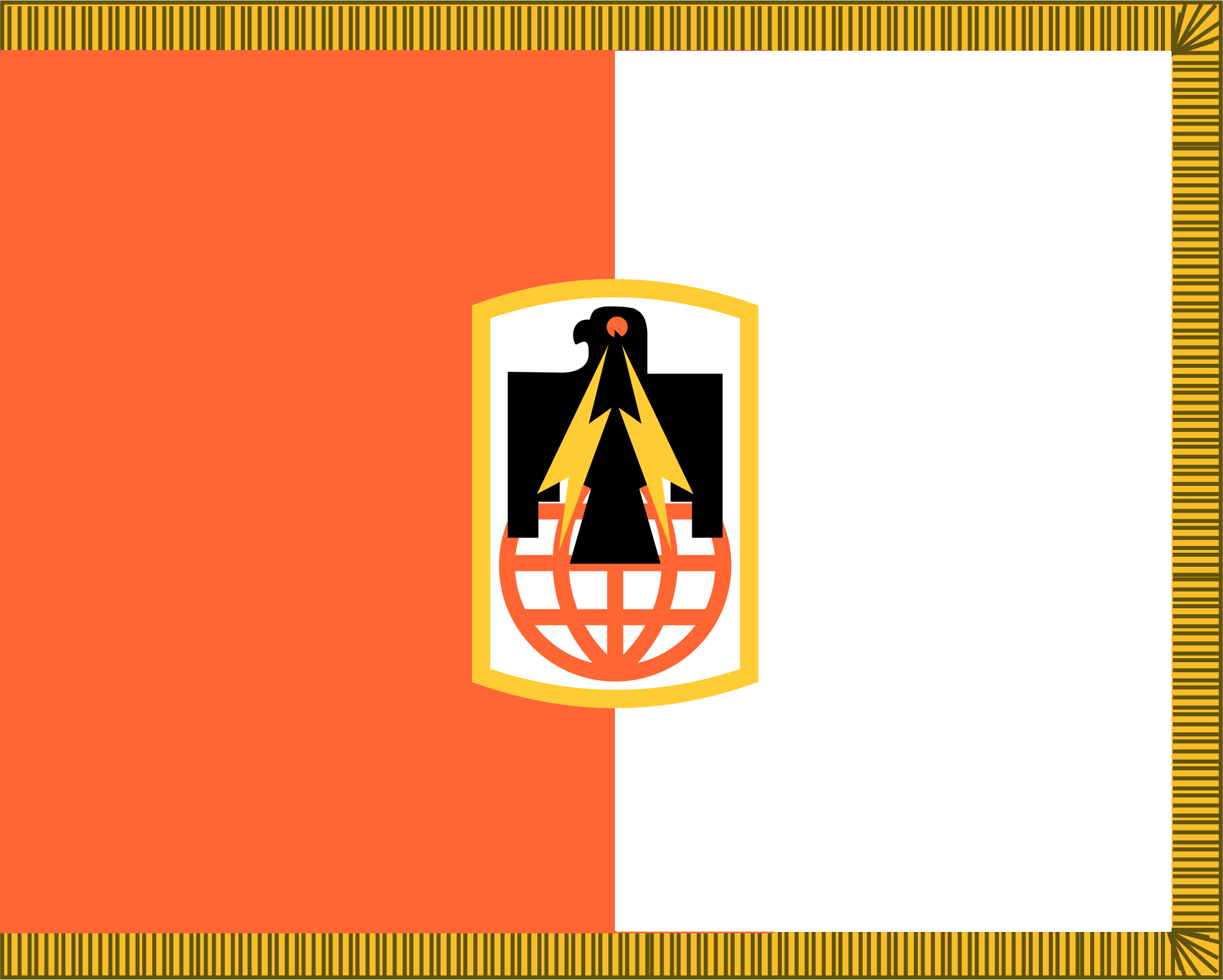
- 11th Signal Brigade Flag

The 11th Corps Signal Brigade ("Desert Thunderbirds") of the United States Army is an element of III Armored Corps, based at Fort Hood, Texas. The unit mascot is the Thunderbird, a hawk-like bird perched upon a globe shooting thunderbolts out of its eyes. Soldiers in this unit call themselves "The Thunderbirds."

== History ==
Designated Headquarters and Headquarters Detachment, 11th Signal Group, 4 September 1964, to support the Joint Chiefs of Staff worldwide contingencies. The 11th Signal Group was originally assigned to Fort Lewis, Washington, as part of the Army Strategic Communications Command (STRATCOM). The group became a regular participant in exercises in Alaska.

On 25 April 1966 the group was reorganized and redesignated Headquarters and Headquarters Company, 11th Signal Group. The following December, the group was reassigned to Fort Huachuca, Arizona.

As the 11th Signal Group the unit contained: HQ, HHQ, and five companies, 505th, 521st, 526th, 557th, and Mobile Operations Signal Companies.

Units of the group participated in Operation Power Pack in 1965.

The group was designated 1 October 1979 as Headquarters and Headquarters Company, 11th Signal Brigade.

During the 1980s, the 11th Signal Brigade forward-deployed two provisional companies: Company B (Separate) at Soto Cano Air Base in Honduras to support Joint Task Force Bravo, and Company C (Separate) in Bahrain to support United States Central Command.

After Iraq's invasion of Kuwait in August 1990, the 11th Signal Brigade (minus two companies that remained to execute other contingency missions) deployed to Saudi Arabia in support of Operations Desert Shield and Desert Storm, which became the 1991 Gulf War.

The 11th Signal Brigade deployed some of its Signal personnel to East Timor in 1999 supporting the U.S. contingent with the International Force East Timor (INTERFET).

On 7 June 2013, the unit cased their colors for the last time on Fort Huachuca and unfurled them on 26 June 2013, at Fort Hood, Texas.

== Operation Sea Signal ==
Company 593rd deployed to Cuba for operation Sea Signal in 94-95.

== Operation Enduring Freedom ==
The 11th Signal Brigade deployed shortly after the 11 September 2001 attacks to support ARCENT in its position as CFLCC. During OEF in 2002, the 11th Signal Brigade had soldiers and civilian personnel supporting CFLCC Forward in Uzbekistan, the U.S. Army's 10th Mountain Division in Bagram, Afghanistan and Task Force Rakkasan (3rd Brigade Combat Team, 101st Airborne Division), in Kandahar, Afghanistan. They also had soldiers deployed to Djibouti, Africa in support of Combined Joint Task Force, Horn of Africa (CJTF-HOA). The "Thunderbird Brigade," successfully performed its mission of providing Command, Control, Communications, Computers, and Internet (C4I) services to the warfighter but soon deployed back home to Fort Huachuca, Arizona shortly after establishing tactical communications networks for coalition forces.

== Operation Iraqi Freedom ==
Shortly after its deployment supporting OEF, the 11th Signal Brigade reconstituted and deployed to the now closed Camp Doha, Kuwait to support CFLCC in early 2003. It successfully enabled the warfighting commanders which included GEN Tommy Franks of USCENTCOM, LTG David McKiernan of CFLCC and LTG William Wallace of V Corps (later commanded by LTG Ricardo Sanchez) to have real-time battlefield communications capability in the Iraqi theater of operations. The 11th Signal Brigade was featured in the History Channel's show Tactical to Practical for its efforts in implementing the use of COTS or "Commercial-off-the-shelf" information technology equipment in a real-world military operation.

== Organization ==
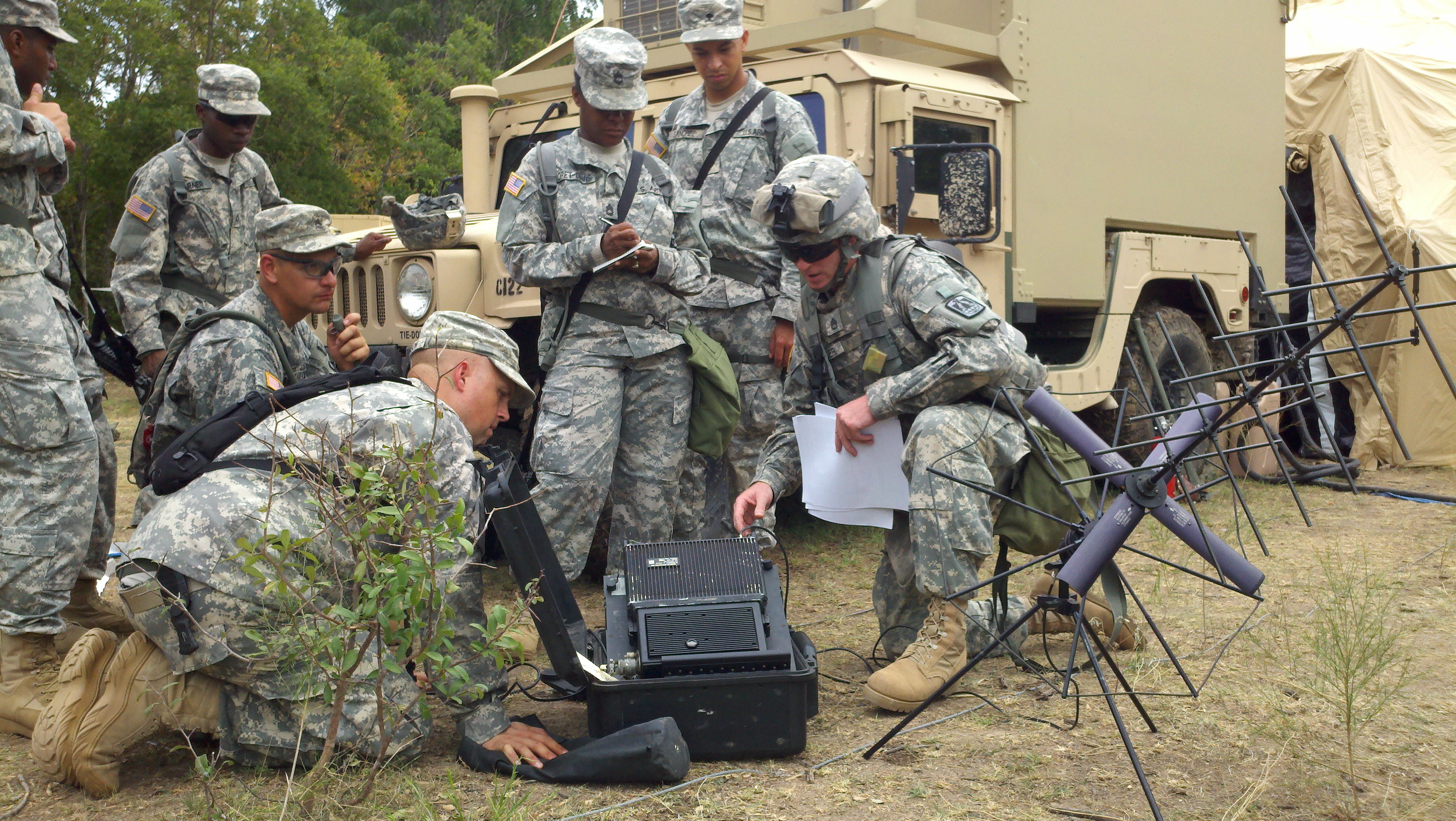
Members of the 11th Signal Brigade during a training exercise in 2010

The 11th Corps Signal Brigade is an Echelons Above Corps or "EAC" Signal Brigade. It comprises the following units:

- Headquarters and Headquarters Company (HHC), 11th Corps Signal Brigade, at Fort Hood, TX
- 57th Expeditionary Signal Battalion (57th ESB), at Fort Hood, TX
- 62nd Expeditionary Signal Battalion (62nd ESB), at Fort Hood, TX
- 86th Expeditionary Signal Battalion (86th ESB), at Fort Bliss, TX

== Capabilities ==
The 11th Corps Signal Brigade provides echelon-above-corps signal support (EAC). It has the capability to install, operate, and maintain a tactical communications network supporting either joint or Army organizations, establish command center communications nodes, area signal centers, and small extension nodes. It provides installation, construction, and test teams on a worldwide basis during peacetime, war, and operations other than war, and in response to emergency requirements to restore or expand information systems facilities. Also, the brigade provides on-site training in the operation and maintenance of new or modified non-tactical information systems and limited commercial-off-the-shelf communications equipment and systems at worldwide locations.

Due to its total communications capabilities, the brigade can support the full spectrum of operations ranging from combat to peacekeeping to humanitarian. Since 1990, the brigade has participated in numerous contingency operations. The entire brigade took part in Operation Desert Shield/Storm. At the height of that operation, the brigade controlled more than five signal battalions and operated the largest tactical communications network since World War II. For its service during these operations, the brigade was awarded the Department of the Army Meritorious Unit Commendation. The brigade also took part in Operations Restore Hope and Continue Hope in Somalia from December 1992 to March 1994; Operation Intrinsic Action/Southern Watch in Kuwait from August to October 1992; and Operation Uphold Democracy in Haiti from September 1994 to March 1996. Brigade soldiers have also supported operations in Korea, Guantanamo Naval Base, Cuba, and Saudi Arabia. Most recently, the brigade supported Operation Desert Thunder in 1998 with a brigade task force.

The principal communications capabilities of the unit include tactical satellite, tropospheric scatter, super high frequency, and ultra high frequency line-of-sight transmission systems, and voice, message, and data switches. The brigade's communications networks are compatible with the mobile subscriber equipment communications networks found at corps and division level. Commanders use C2 to control, direct, and coordinate military forces to accomplish their missions. This process encompasses the personnel, equipment, communications, facilities, and procedures necessary to gather and analyze information; to plan for what is to be done; to issue instructions; and to supervise the execution of operations. Communications allows commanders to direct operations on the battlefield and to monitor their execution. It is a critical element to battlefield synchronization.

== Past commanders ==
NOTE: This is an incomplete list. Please update with previous commanders

Title BG	Name Anthony F. Albright	Start 1975	Finish 1976	Relevant Operations
Group Commander	COL Thomas B. Richey	1966	1968	
Group Commander	BG Anthony F. Albright	1975	1976	
Brigade Commander	COL Edwin W. Chandler	1978	1980	
Brigade Commander	COL Roy L. Loudermilk Jr.	Oct 1980	Oct 1980	
Brigade Commander	BG Mark Weiberger	1980	1988	
Brigade Commander	COL John M. Watkins Jr.	1986	1988	
Brigade Commander	COL Charles G. Sutten Jr.	Nov 1988	Dec 1990	Operation Desert Shield
Brigade Commander	COL Andrew C. Follmer II	Dec 1990	Dec 1992	Operation Desert Shield/Desert Storm
Brigade Commander	COL James E. Downey	Dec 1992	Sep 1994	
Brigade Commander	COL James C. Hylton	Sep 1994	Sep 1996	Operation Sea Signal
Brigade Commander	COL Kenneth C. Gongaware	Sep 1996	July 1998	Operation Desert Thunder
Brigade Commander	COL Daniel R. Judy	July 1998	Aug 2000	East Timor
Brigade Commander	COL Mark S. Bowman	Aug 2000	Aug 2002	Operation Enduring Freedom
Brigade Commander	COL Brian R. Hurley	Aug 2002	Aug 2004	Operation Iraqi Freedom
Brigade Commander	COL Michael S. Yarmie	Aug 2004	Aug 2006	Operation Iraqi Freedom
Brigade Commander	COL John B. Hildebrand	Aug 2006	Feb 2009	Operation Iraqi Freedom
Brigade Commander	COL Francis J. Huber	Feb 2009	Mar 2011	Operation Iraqi Freedom
Brigade Commander	COL Patrick Dedham	Mar 2011	June 2013	Operation Enduring Freedom
Brigade Commander	COL James Parks III	June 2013	July 2015	Operation Enduring Freedom
Brigade Commander	COL Gary G. Ridenhour	July 2015	July 2017	Operation Enduring Freedom
Brigade Commander	COL David Thomas	July 2017	July 2019	Operation Inherent Resolve
Brigade Commander	COL Brian C. North	July 2019	August 2021	Operation Inherent Resolve
Brigade Commander	COL Brian P. Jacobson	August 2021	July 2023	
Brigade Commander	COL James C. Sullivan	July 2023	Present	
