= David D. McKiernan =

US Army general

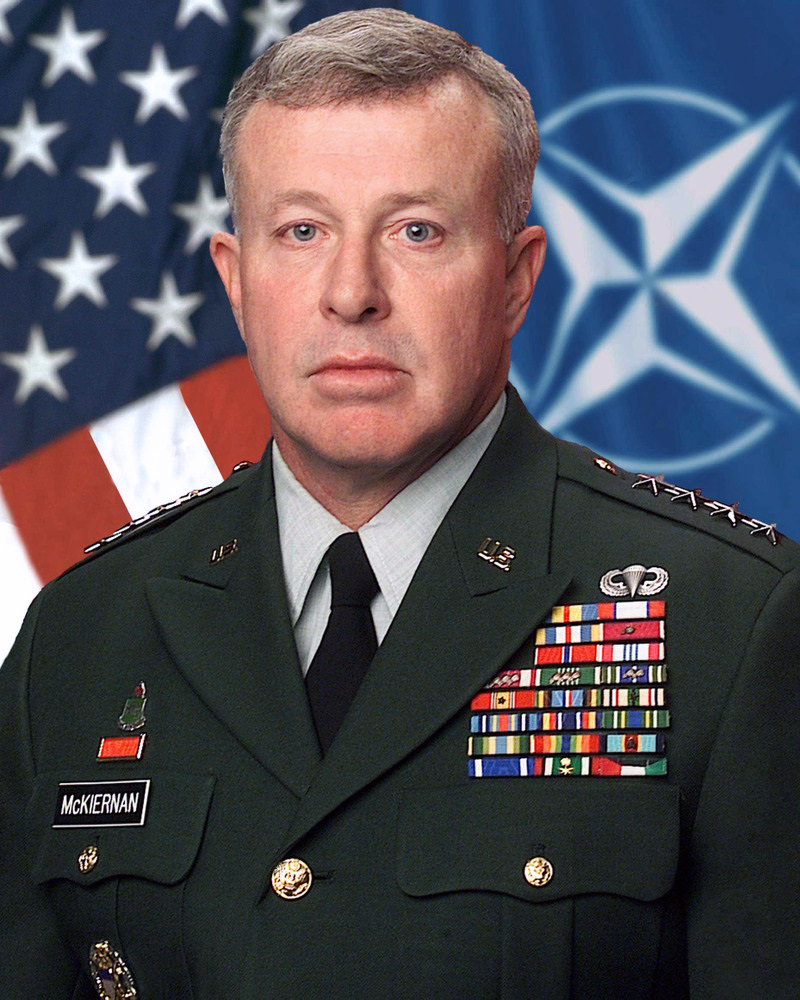
- Born: 11 December 1950 (age 75); Atlanta, Georgia, U.S.
- Military career
- Allegiance: United States
- Branch: United States Army
- Service years: 1972–2009
- Rank: General
- Commands: International Security Assistance Force; United States Forces – Afghanistan; Seventh United States Army; Third United States Army; Coalition Forces Land Component Command; 1st Cavalry Division; 1st Brigade, 1st Cavalry Division; 1st Battalion, 35th Armored Regiment
- Conflicts: Gulf War; Iraq War; War in Afghanistan
- Awards: Defense Distinguished Service Medal (2); Army Distinguished Service Medal (3); Defense Superior Service Medal; Legion of Merit (3); Bronze Star Medal

David D. McKiernan (born 11 December 1950) is a retired United States Army four-star general who served in Afghanistan as Commander, International Security Assistance Force (ISAF). He served concurrently as Commander, United States Forces – Afghanistan (USFOR-A) from 6 October 2008 to 15 June 2009.

Prior to Afghanistan, McKiernan was Commanding General, United States Army, Europe and Seventh United States Army from 14 December 2005 to 2 May 2008. Before promotion to four-star rank, he served as Commanding General, Third United States Army and Coalition Forces Land Component Command from 2002 to 2004, where he commanded all allied ground forces during the 2003 invasion of Iraq, and as Deputy Commanding General, United States Army Forces Command, the army's largest major command, from 2004 to 2005.

Secretary of Defense Robert Gates said new leadership was needed as the administration of President Barack Obama launched a new strategy in the seven-year-old War in Afghanistan. McKiernan was replaced by two generals, General Stanley A. McChrystal (Commander) and Lieutenant General David M. Rodriguez (Deputy Commander), ISAF and USFOR-A.

== Army career ==
McKiernan graduated from the College of William & Mary with a Bachelor of Arts degree in history in 1972. He was commissioned from the Reserve Officers' Training Corps and entered active duty as an Armor officer. He holds a Master of Public Administration degree from Shippensburg University and an honorary doctorate in public service from William & Mary.

McKiernan's commands have included:

- 1st Battalion, 35th Armored Regiment, 1st Armored Division, 1988–1990;
- 1st Brigade, 1st Cavalry Division, 1993–1995;
- 1st Cavalry Division, 1999–2001;
- Third United States Army/Combined Forces Land Component Command, 2002–2004.
- Seventh United States Army/United States Army Europe, 2005–2008
- International Security Assistance Force (ISAF) and United States Forces – Afghanistan, 2008–2009

McKiernan gained experience in the Balkans as a staff officer in the 1990s. In July 1996, McKiernan joined the Allied Rapid Reaction Corps, serving as the Deputy Chief of Staff G2/G3, forward deployed in both Sarajevo, Bosnia-Herzegovina and Rheindahlen (Mönchengladbach), Germany. From August 1998 until September 1999, he served as Deputy Chief of Staff, Operations, Headquarters, United States Army, Europe and Seventh Army during a period of simultaneous operations in Bosnia, Albania, and Kosovo.

Prior to these appointments McKiernan served in the VII Corps Headquarters during the Gulf War and then as the G3 in the 1st Cavalry Division (approx 1992–3) in the rank of lieutenant colonel. The first appointment was probably his first experience of working with other officers or formed units of other nationalities, in the second he had British Exchange Officers on his staff.

In 2001, McKiernan was assigned as G3 (Operations), Headquarters, Department of the Army. Following that posting, in September 2002, General McKiernan assumed command of the Third United States Army and United States Army Forces Central Command, and became the Coalition Forces Land Component Commander for United States Central Command in preparation for Operation Iraqi Freedom. In March 2003, McKiernan led all coalition and United States conventional ground forces that attacked Iraq to remove Saddam Hussein from power.

Following his assignment as ground forces commander, McKiernan was assigned as Deputy Commanding General/Chief of Staff for United States Army Forces Command, the largest major command in the Army which is responsible for the readiness and deployment of army forces based in the United States. Then he assumed command of Seventh Army/United States Army Europe. He was then assigned to Afghanistan as Commander, International Security Assistance Force (ISAF) and United States Forces-Afghanistan from 3 June 2008 to 15 June 2009.

== Iraq War troop levels debate ==
In their book, Cobra II, military historians Michael Gordon and Bernard E. Trainor suggest that McKiernan was unhappy to hear of the cancellation of the deployment of the 1st Cavalry Division, a 17,000-soldier force that was scheduled to arrive in Iraq as a follow-on reinforcement. Its deployment was cancelled on 21 April 2003, after U.S. Defense Secretary Donald Rumsfeld raised the issue of whether it was needed. Previously, shortly before the war, McKiernan won Pentagon approval for a new war plan that increased the number of ground troops, calling the new war plan COBRA II.

During Operation Iraqi Freedom, McKiernan had a different view of the battlefield than his superior, General Tommy Franks. McKiernan saw the Fedayeen Saddam fighters as a major threat and one of the "centers of gravity" in Iraq, while Franks dismissed the importance of the irregulars. The military was also surprised when McKiernan and his staff were not given command for post-war operations in Iraq, which instead went to V Corps and the newly promoted Lieutenant General Ricardo Sanchez.

== Targeted killing ==
In a 2008 interview by Der Spiegel, McKiernan was asked whether Germany was a particularly difficult ally considering that its government requested limitations on its soldiers' deployment in Afghanistan, feeling that it might violate Germany's constitution if they were to conduct a targeted killing in the absence of a direct attack. McKiernan responded:

If ... the decision has been a legal and political decision back in Germany ... I accept that. But as a soldier, I don't understand it. I don't understand ever putting your men and women in harm's way without their having the full ability to protect themselves. That also means operating on actionable intelligence to defeat insurgents, and protect your forces. That's how you keep your soldiers alive.

== Awards and decorations ==
McKiernan awards and decorations include, but are not limited to:

Defense Distinguished Service Medal (with oak leaf cluster)
Army Distinguished Service Medal (with two oak leaf clusters)
Defense Superior Service Medal
Legion of Merit (with two oak leaf clusters)
Bronze Star Medal
Defense Meritorious Service Medal
Meritorious Service Medal (with three oak leaf clusters)
Army Commendation Medal (with three oak leaf clusters)
Army Achievement Medal (with two oak leaf clusters)

Parachutist Badge
Ranger Tab

Military offices
Preceded by Paul T. Mikolashek	Commanding General of the Third United States Army; 2002–2004	Succeeded by R. Steven Whitcomb
Preceded by Burwell B. Bell III	Commanding General of United States Army Europe/Seventh United States Army; 2005–2008	Succeeded by Gary D. Speer
Preceded by Dan K. McNeill	Commander, International Security Assistance Force (ISAF); Commander, United States Forces – Afghanistan; 2008–2009	Succeeded by Stanley A. McChrystal
