= War against the Islamic State ground order of battle =

This is the Military intervention against ISIL ground order of battle, which lists the American forces and allies aerial assets that have taken part in the Military intervention against ISIL between June 2014 and the present day.

== American ==
=== Units ===
Combined Joint Forces Land Component Command-Iraq

- 1st Infantry Division
- 3rd Brigade Combat Team, 82nd Airborne Division (January – September 2015).
  - 2nd Battalion, 505th Infantry Regiment
- 3rd Brigade Combat Team, 10th Mountain Division
- 1st Brigade Combat Team, 10th Mountain Division (September 2015 – June 2016).
- 2nd Brigade Combat Team, 101st Airborne Division (Air Assault) (June 2016 – January 2017).
  - 1st Battalion, 502nd Infantry Regiment
  - 1st Battalion, 26th Infantry Regiment
- 2nd Brigade Combat Team, 82nd Airborne Division (January 2017 – 2017)
  - 2nd Battalion, 325th Airborne Infantry Regiment
- 218th Maneuver Enhancement Brigade (2019)
  - 4th Battalion, 118th Infantry Regiment, 30th Armored Brigade Combat Team (2019)

=== Installations ===
- Bakhira Base (SW of Mosul)
- Camp Swift (SE of Mosul)
- Forward Operating Base Union III (Baghdad)
- Patrol Base Al Tarab (W of Mosul)
- Shahrazad School (Mosul)
- Tactical assembly area Wyvern (Mosul)

== British ==
=== Units ===
- Elements of 2nd Battalion, The Yorkshire Regiment (2 YORKS)
- Elements of 2nd Battalion, The Princess of Wales's Royal Regiment (2 PWRR)
- Elements of 1st Battalion, The Rifles (1 RIFLES) (July 2015 – January 2017)
- Elements of 2nd Battalion, The Duke of Lancaster's Regiment (2 LANCS)
- Elements of The Highlanders, 4th Battalion, Royal Regiment of Scotland (4 SCOTS) between February and July 2017.
- Elements of Unknown Battalion between July and December 2017.
- Elements of The Royal Highland Fusiliers, 2nd Battalion, The Royal Regiment of Scotland (2 SCOTS) from December 2017.
- 5 Armoured Engineer Squadron, 22 Engineer Regiment during 2017.

=== Installations ===
- Al Asad Airbase
- Besmaya Range Complex
- Camp Taji (Taji)

== See also ==
- Operation Inherent Resolve, name for American operations
- Operation Okra, name for Australian operations
- Operation Shader, name for British operations
- Operation Impact, name for Canadian operations
- Opération Chammal, name for French operations

Commander headquarters of ongoing operations:

- Combined Joint Task Force – Operation Inherent Resolve
