= Operation Inherent Resolve =

Military intervention against the Islamic State of Iraq and the Levant

- Part of the War against the Islamic State, the war on terror, the War in Iraq (2013–2017), the Syrian civil war, and the Libyan civil war (2014–2020)
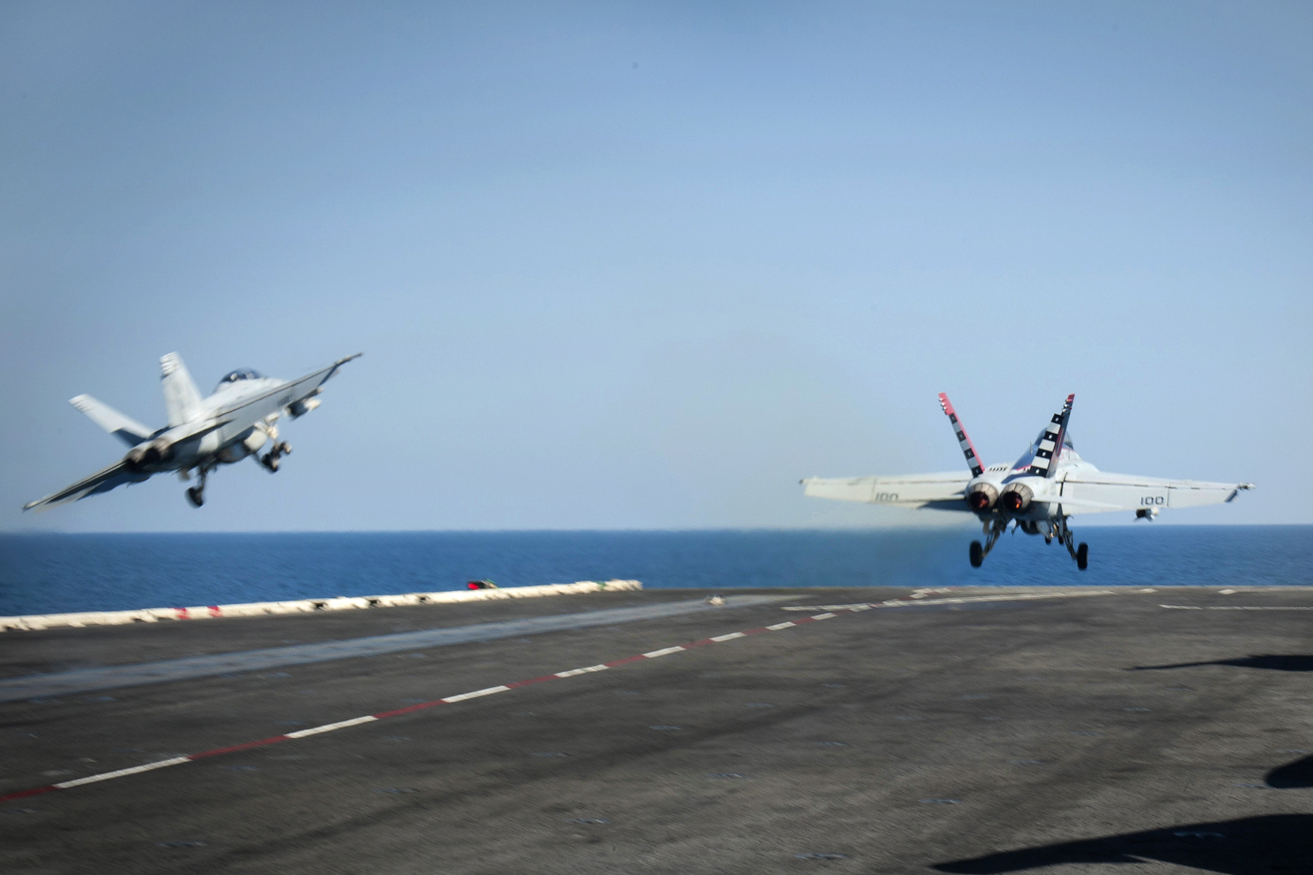
- U.S. Navy F/A-18F Super Hornets of VFA-22 take off from USS Carl Vinson to support U.S. efforts for Operation Inherent Resolve in October 2014.
| Date | 15 June 2014 – present (12 years, 3 months, 2 weeks and 1 day): Iraq: 15 June 2014 – 30 September 2026 (12 years, 3 months, 2 weeks and 1 day); Syria: 22 September 2014 – 19 June 2026 (11 years, 8 months and 4 weeks); Jordan: 17 October 2014 – present (12 years and 1 month); Libya: 13 November 2015 – 29 September 2019 (3 years, 10 months, 2 weeks and 2 days) |
| Location | Iraq; Syria; Jordan; Libya |
| Result | US-allied victory: CJTF-OIR and its partner forces liberated nearly 110,000 square kilometers and 7.7 million people from Islamic State control; Death of first four ISIS caliphs; Territorial defeat of ISIL in Iraq on 9 December 2017 and territorial defeat of ISIL in Syria on 23 March 2019; Withdrawal of U.S. ground forces from Libya in April 2019; Last known U.S. drone strike in Libya took place on September 29, 2019; End of combat mission in Iraq in December 2021; Withdrawal of U.S. ground forces from Baghdad and key military bases in Iraq in August 2025.; Withdrawal of U.S. ground forces from northeastern Syria on 16 April 2026; Last known U.S. drone strike in Syria took place on 19 June 2026; Withdrawal of all remaining U.S. forces from Iraq stationed in the semi autonomous Kurdistan Region on 30 September 2026 |

Belligerents
| United States; Combined Joint Task Force – Operation Inherent Resolve | Islamic State al-Qaeda: al-Nusra Front (2014–2017); Khorasan group (2012–2017); Jund al-Aqsa (2014–17); Hurras al-Din (2018–2025); Syrian Salvation Government (2017–2024): Hay'at Tahrir al-Sham (2017–2025); Islamic Front (2013–2015); Ahrar al-Sham (2014–18); Turkistan Islamic Party |

Commanders and leaders
| (United States) Barack Obama; (United States) Joe Biden; (United States) Donald Trump; (United States) Chuck Hagel; (United States) Ash Carter; (United States) Jim Mattis; (United States) Patrick M. Shanahan; (United States) Richard V. Spencer; (United States) Mark Esper; (United States) Christopher C. Miller; (United States) David Norquist; (United States) Lloyd Austin; (United States) Pete Hegseth; (United States) Robert G. Salesses; (United States) John Kerry; (United States) Thomas A. Shannon Jr.; (United States) Rex Tillerson; (United States) John Sullivan; (United States) Mike Pompeo; (United States) Daniel Bennett Smith; (United States) Antony Blinken; (United States) Marco Rubio; (United States) Robert P. White; (United States) Matthew McFarlane; (United States) Joel B. Vowell; (United States) Kevin C. Leahy | Abu Hafs al-Hashimi al-Qurashi (leader of IS); Abu al-Hussein al-Husseini al-Qurashi †; Abu al-Hasan al-Hashimi al-Qurashi †; Abu Ibrahim al-Hashimi al-Qurashi †; Abu Bakr al-Baghdadi X; (Islamic State) Abu Alaa Afri † (Deputy Leader of IS); (Islamic State) Abu Mohammad al-Adnani † (Spokesperson); Abu Ayman al-Iraqi † (Head of Military Shura); Abu Muslim al-Turkmani † (Deputy Leader, Iraq); Abu Ali al-Anbari † (Deputy Leader, Syria); Abu Omar al-Shishani † (Field commander in Syria); Ali Husayn al-Ulaywi † (Leader of ISIS in Syria); Abu Khayr al-Masri † (al-Qaeda deputy leader); Abu Humam al-Shami † (al-Nusra Military Chief and Leader of Hurras al-Din); Muhsin al-Fadhli † (Leader of Khorasan); David Drugeon † (chief bombmaker); Mohammed Islambouli (Leader of Khorasan); Ahmed al-Sharaa (Emir of Tahrir al-Sham (2017–2025)); Abu Jaber Sheikh (Emir of Ahrar al-Sham (2014–2015); Abu Yahia al-Hamawi (Emir of Ahrar al-Sham (2015–2017)) |

Units involved
| Elements of: U.S. Army; U.S. Marine Corps; U.S. Navy; U.S. Air Force; U.S. Space Force; U.S. Coast Guard; Coalition Joint Forces Land Component Command-Iraq | (Islamic State) Military of IS: Wilayat al-Iraq; Wilayat al-Sham |

Strength
| United States: 4,400 troops (in Iraq); 2,500 troops (in Kuwait); 7,000 contractors; USS George H.W. Bush carrier strike group; USS Carl Vinson carrier strike group (replaced USS George H.W. Bush in late October 2014); USS Theodore Roosevelt carrier strike group (replaced USS Carl Vinson in late March 2015, departed in October 2015); USS Harry S. Truman carrier strike group (replaced USS Theodore Roosevelt in December 2015); USS Dwight D. Eisenhower carrier strike group (replaced USS Harry S. Truman in June 2016, departed in late December 2016); USS George H. W. Bush carrier strike group (replaced USS Dwight D. Eisenhower in February 2017); F-15 Eagle, F-16 Falcon, F/A-18 Hornet, F/A-18 Super Hornet and F-22 Raptor fighter aircraft; AV-8B Harrier II & A-10 Thunderbolt ground-attack aircraft; B-1 Lancer and Boeing B-52 Stratofortress bomber aircraft; Lockheed AC-130 gunships; EA-6B Prowler & EA-18G Growler electronic warfare aircraft; Lockheed C-130 Hercules transport aircraft; Lockheed U-2, Northrop Grumman E-8 Joint STARS & Boeing RC-135 reconnaissance aircraft; Boeing KC-135 Stratotanker & McDonnell Douglas KC-10 Extender refueling aircraft; Boeing AH-64 Apache attack helicopters; MH-60M Black Hawk multi-mission helicopters; MQ-1 Predator & MQ-9 Reaper unmanned ground-attack aircraft; RQ-4 Global Hawk & Lockheed Martin RQ-170 Sentinel unmanned surveillance aircraft; North American Rockwell OV-10 Bronco | Islamic State of Iraq and the Levant: 9,000 to 18,000 (CIA estimate, January 2015); 20,000 to 200,000 (peak, late 2014); 3 MiG-21 or MiG-23 aircraft; At least 600 tanks; At least 5 drones; al-Qaeda: Khorasan: 50; Jund al-Aqsa: 2,100; Islamic Front: Ahrar al-Sham: 26,000–30,000+; Syrian Salvation Government: Tahrir al-Sham: 50,000+ |

Casualties and losses
| United States: 23 hostile deaths; 93 non-hostile deaths; 492 (WIA); 18 civilians killed (5 executed (executed) and 1 unknown); 1 F-16 crashed and 1 F-15 damaged; 2 helicopters lost (CH-53 Sea Stallion); 4 MQ-1 Predator drones shot down | Islamic State of Iraq and the Levant: 80,000+ killed by American and allied airstrikes; 32,000+ targets destroyed or damaged (as of 30 September 2016); 164 tanks; 388 HMMWVs; 2,638 pieces of oil infrastructure; 1,000+ fuel tanker trucks; 2,000+ pick-up trucks, VBIEDs, and other vehicles; (per coalition) al-Qaeda: 400+ killed; Islamic Front: Ahrar ash-Sham: 3 killed Syrian Salvation Government: Tahrir al-Sham: 6 killed |
- Tens of thousands of civilians killed by IS (per Iraqi Body Count and SOHR); Between 8,220 and 13,299 civilians killed by Coalition airstrikes in Syria and Iraq (per Airwars); 1,437 civilians killed by Coalition Operations (per AirWars) Over 970,000 civilians in Iraq and Syria displaced, or fled to Turkey and other countries

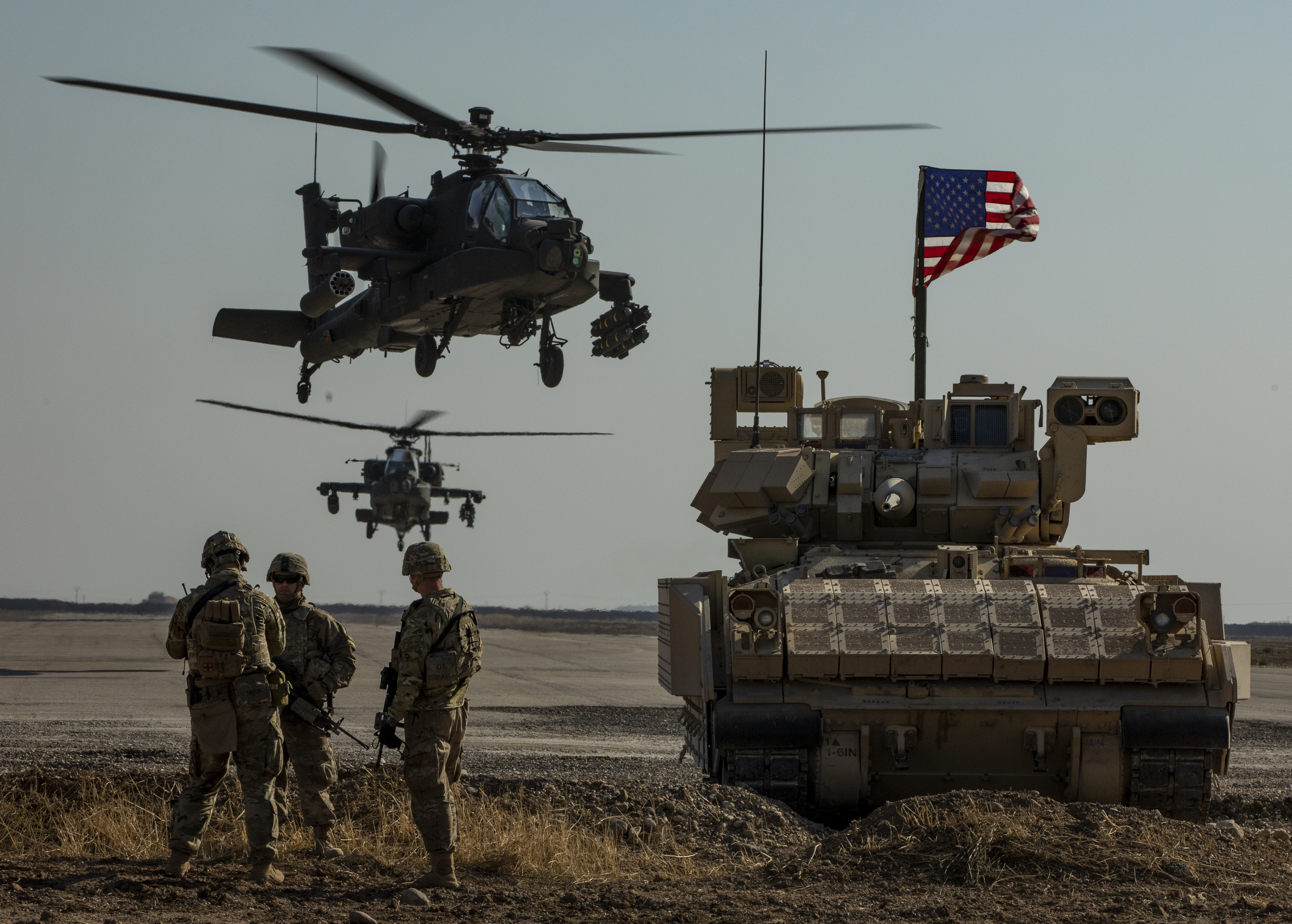
U.S. soldiers from Alpha Company, 1st Battalion, 6th Infantry Regiment, 2nd Armored Brigade Combat Team, 1st Armored Division supported by an Apache helicopter and a Bradley IFV in Syria during Operation Inherent Resolve, 23 November 2020

Operation Inherent Resolve (OIR) is the United States military's operational name for the international war against the Islamic State (IS) (Note: also known as the Islamic State of Iraq and Syria (ISIS), the Islamic State of Iraq and the Levant (ISIL) or its Arab acronym "Daesh") including a campaign in Iraq and a campaign in Syria, with a closely related campaign in Libya.

Through 18 September 2018, the U.S. Army's III Armored Corps was responsible for Combined Joint Task Force – Operation Inherent Resolve (CJTF—OIR) and were replaced by the XVIII Airborne Corps. The campaign was primarily waged by American and British forces in support of local allies, most prominently the Iraqi Security Forces (ISF) and Syrian Democratic Forces (SDF). Combat ground troops, mostly special forces, infantry, and artillery have also been deployed, especially in Iraq. Of the airstrikes, some 80% have been conducted by the military of the United States, with the rest by the United Kingdom (Operation Shader), Australia, Belgium, Canada, Denmark, France, Jordan, the Netherlands, Saudi Arabia, Turkey, and the United Arab Emirates.

By October 2017, around the time of IS's territorial defeat in Iraq, CJTF—OIR claimed that around 80,000 IS militants had been killed by it and its allies (excluding those targeted by Russian and Syrian air strikes). According to the Pentagon, by March 2019, the day of IS's territorial defeat in Syria, CJTF—OIR and its partner forces had liberated nearly 110,000 square kilometers (42,471 square miles) of land and 7.7 million people from IS, the vast majority of the self-proclaimed caliphate's territory and subjects. By the end of August 2019, it had conducted 34,573 strikes. Tens of thousands more were killed by partner forces on the ground (the SDF alone claimed to have killed 25,336 IS fighters by the end of 2017). According to Airwars, between 8,220 and 13,299 civilians were killed in the airstrikes in Syria and Iraq, with an additional 1,437 civilians killed in other operations.

== Background ==
The United States relied on a combination of legal frameworks to justify its use of force against ISIS in Iraq and Syria, namely: military assistance on request, self-defence under Article 51 of the United Nations (UN) Charter, and the "unwilling or unable" doctrine. However, this legal reasoning was not unanimously accepted by other coalition members, resulting in differing geographic scopes of operation—some states restricted their involvement to Iraq, while others also conducted operations in Syria. Moreover, these justifications continue to be the subject of legal debate among scholars.

=== Legal basis under international law ===
International law prohibits the use of force against another state, as provided in Article 2(4) of the UN Charter. However, there are two exceptions to 'violate' this legal prohibition, which is through authorisation of the United Nations Security Council (UNSC), as stated in Article 42 of the UN Charter, and in self-defence, in accordance with Article 51 of the UN Charter.

==== Military assistance on request ====
Military assistance provided at the request of a state does not require UN authorisation nor the invocation of Article 51, as it falls within a state's sovereign right under customary international law to request such assistance and does not necessarily entail the use of force. As such, it does not constitute a 'violation' of the prohibition on the use of force. However, in order to remain within the legal framework of military assistance—rather than constituting an intervention that breaches the prohibition on the use of force—the inviting state determines the scale and scope of the intervening force, as the operation's sole purpose is to provide assistance to the inviting sovereignty. Furthermore, the inviting state cannot legally authorise the use of force on foreign territory, as this would violate Article 2(4) of the UN Charter, therefore, military assistance on request is confined to the borders of the inviting state.

In 2014, the Iraqi government submitted two formal letters to the UNSC, requesting military assistance in response to the ongoing threat posed by ISIS along its borders. Several states participating in OIR acted solely on the basis of this request, thereby limiting their operations to Iraqi territory, as the Iraqi government had no legal authority to authorise military action on Syrian soil. By responding exclusively to Iraq's request, the scale and scope of the foreign military presence was determined through agreements with the Iraqi authorities and remained confined within Iraq's borders, despite ISIS maintaining a stronghold in eastern Syria. The Obama administration relied on this legal framework—military assistance upon request—to justify its operations within Iraq. However, as Syrian President Bashar al-Assad had not granted consent for foreign military intervention, an alternative legal basis was required to justify military action against ISIS in Syria.

Additionally, scholars such as Ashley Deeks have argued that the U.S. tends to avoid relying on military assistance upon request as a legal framework, as such operations are entirely dependent on the level of consent granted by the inviting state and could require the U.S. to withdraw its forces should that state revoke its request.

==== Article 51: Individual or Collective Self-defence ====
To justify its operations within Syria, the United States invoked Article 51 of the UN Charter, citing the principle of collective self-defence on behalf of Iraq. This was based on the Iraqi government's request for a U.S.-led international campaign against ISIS. Simultaneously, the United States also invoked the right of individual self-defence, referencing the threat posed by ISIS to its own national security.

Article 51 of the UN Charter recognizes the "inherent right of individual or collective self-defence if an armed attack occurs against a Member of the United Nations". In 1986, during the Nicaraqua v. United States case, the International Court of Justice (ICJ) spelled out several pre-conditions for the lawful invocation of Article 51:

1. A state may only invoke individual self-defence if it has been the victim of an 'armed attack';
2. Collective self-defence requires a victim state to declare itself as such and to formally request collective measures from other states;
3. Any invocation of Article 51 must be reported to the UNSC.

In its letters to the UN Security Council, the Iraqi government formally requested military assistance in response to an armed attack against its sovereignty. Moreover, given that ISIS-controlled territory extended across a significant area spanning both Iraq and Syria, the Iraqi government argued that, in order to neutralise the threat posed by ISIS to Iraq, it was necessary to eradicate the group entirely—including through military operations on Syrian territory under ISIS control. Based on this request, in which Iraq declared itself a 'victim' of an armed attack, the Obama administration announced the invocation of collective self-defence on Iraq's behalf against ISIS, via a letter submitted to the Security Council. By doing so, the necessary conditions for a lawful invocation of Article 51 were met.

However, according to the ICJ, extraterritorial self-defensive operations against a non-state actor within the territory of a host state require the consent of that state's government, unless the conduct of the non-state actor can be legally attributed to it. This condition was not fulfilled in the case of Syria, as President Assad was actively engaged in fighting ISIS and, moreover, had neither granted consent to the U.S. nor received any formal request to permit military operations on Syrian soil. Consequently, despite invoking Article 51, the Obama administration continued to face legal challenges in justifying its military actions against ISIS in Syria.

==== Unwilling or unable doctrine ====
To address these legal challenges and justify its operations against ISIS in Syria, the United States, in its letter to the UNSC, also invoked the "unwilling or unable" doctrine. It accused the Syrian regime of both an inability and unwillingness to prevent ISIS from using Syrian territory to launch attacks against Iraq. According to the 'unwilling or unable' doctrine, a state has a responsibility to eliminate threats originating from within its borders. If it is deemed 'unable'—for instance, due to insufficient military capability—or 'unwilling', due to a lack of political will or action, the international community may assume the responsibility of neutralising the threat posed by non-state actors operating within the hosting state's territory.

However, although the 'unwilling or unable' doctrine was invoked by several states participating in OIR to justify their involvement, it remains without clear legal standing under international law. Moreover, some scholars have questioned the applicability of the term 'unwilling', noting that the Assad regime was actively engaged in combat against ISIS. Despite public expressions of willingness by the Syrian government to cooperate in efforts to defeat ISIS, the U.S. maintained that, due to the Assad regime's failure to eliminate ISIS within Syrian territory, it was not obligated to seek permission for conducting military operations on Syrian soil.

Despite these questions concerning its validity, the Obama administration used the 'unwilling or unable' doctrine to justify the military intervention against ISIS in Syria. By doing so, this doctrine became an extension of the invocation of self-defence by the U.S., to make self-defensive action in Syria justified as response to the armed attacks perpetrated by ISIS performed from Syrian soil.

== History ==
=== 2014 ===
Unlike their coalition partners, and unlike previous combat operations, no name was initially given to the conflict against IS by the U.S. government. The decision to keep the conflict nameless drew considerable media criticism.

The U.S. decided in October 2014 to name its military efforts against IS as "Operation Inherent Resolve"; the U.S. Central Command (CENTCOM) news release announcing the name noted that:

According to CENTCOM officials, the name INHERENT RESOLVE is intended to reflect the unwavering resolve and deep commitment of the U.S. and partner nations in the region and around the globe to eliminate the terrorist group ISIL and the threat they pose to Iraq, the region and the wider international community. It also symbolizes the willingness and dedication of coalition members to work closely with our friends in the region and apply all available dimensions of national power necessary—diplomatic, informational, military, economic—to degrade and ultimately destroy ISIL.

The US Defense Department announced at the end of October 2014 that troops operating in support of Operation Inherent Resolve after 15 June were eligible for the Global War on Terrorism Expeditionary Medal.

By 4 December 2014, three U.S. service members had died from accidents or non-combat injuries.

=== 2015 ===
In November 2015, Commodore Captain Augustus Bennett commanding the USS Kearsarge (LHD-3) Amphibious Ready Group entered the 5th Fleet AOR in conjunction with the 26th Marine Expeditionary Unit under the command of Colonel Robert Fulford, consisting of the, USS Arlington (LPD-24) and USS Oak Hill (LSD-51) to commence airstrikes on IS. Prior to this, the ARG rendezvoused with the Turkish Navy for Egemen 2015. They concluded their OIR mission on 10 March with a total of 130 sorties and 60 strikes.

On 22 October 2015, a U.S. Master Sergeant, Joshua Wheeler, was killed in action when he, with about 30 other U.S. special operations soldiers and a Peshmerga unit, conducted a prison break near Hawija in the disputed territories of Northern Iraq, in which about 70 hostages were rescued, five IS members were captured and "a number" were killed or wounded. Sergeant First Class Thomas Payne was awarded the Medal of Honor for his actions during the operation. The Kurdistan Regional Government said after the raid that none of the 15 prisoners it was intended to rescue were found.

From May, North American Rockwell OV-10 Broncos joined the operation, flying more than 120 combat sorties over 82 days. It is speculated they provided close air support for special forces missions. The experiment ended satisfactorily, but a US Air Force spokesman stated it remains unlikely they will invest in reactivating the OV-10 on a regular basis because of the overhead cost of operating an additional aircraft type.

=== 2016 ===
By 9 March 2016, nearly 11,000 airstrikes had been launched on IS (and occasionally Al-Nusra), killing over 27,000 fighters and striking over 22,000 targets, including 139 tanks, 371 Humvees, and 1,216 pieces of oil infrastructure. Approximately 80% of these airstrikes have been conducted by American forces, with the remaining 20% being launched by other members of the coalition, such as the United Kingdom and Australia. A total of 7,268 strikes hit targets in Iraq, while 3,602 hit targets in Syria. On 12 June 2016, it was reported that 120 IS leaders, commanders, propagandists, recruiters and other high-value individuals were killed so far this year.

Until March 2016, U.S. military members were ineligible for Campaign Medals and other service decorations due to the continuing ambiguous nature of the continuing U.S. involvement in Iraq. However, on 30 March 2016, U.S. Secretary of Defense Ash Carter announced the creation of a new medal, named "Inherent Resolve Campaign Medal".

On 3 June 2016, aircraft flying from the USS Harry S. Truman in the Mediterranean Sea began airstrikes on IS. On 16 June 2016, AV-8B II+ Harriers of the 13th MEU flying from the USS Boxer in the Persian Gulf also began airstrikes on IS, marking the first time the U.S. Navy used ship-based aircraft from both the Mediterranean and the Persian Gulf at the same time during Operation Inherent Resolve.

By 27 July 2016, U.S. and coalition partners had conducted more than 14,000 airstrikes in Iraq and Syria: Nearly 11,000 of those strikes were from U.S. aircraft and the majority of the strikes (more than 9,000) were in Iraq. Of the 26,374 targets hit, nearly 8,000 were against IS fighting positions, while approximately 6,500 hit buildings; IS staging areas and oil infrastructure were each hit around 1,600 times. On 15 December 2016, the U.K. Defense Secretary Michael Fallon said that "more than 25,000 Daesh fighters have now been killed," a number that was half of the United States' estimate. When asked about this discrepancy, the UK's Ministry of Defense said that it stood by his estimate.

Since the first U.S. airstrikes on IS targets in Iraq on 8 August 2014, over two years, the U.S. military has spent over $8.4 billion fighting IS.

BBC News reported in 2017 that according to the American think tank Council on Foreign Relations, in 2016 alone, the U.S. dropped 12,192 bombs in Syria and 12,095 in Iraq.

==== Operation Odyssey Lightning ====
From August to December 2016, the U.S. conducted another similar operation in Libya, code-named Operation Odyssey Lightning, during the battle of Sirte, which was the local capital of IS's Libyan branch. In September 2017, the US Africa Command announced that 495 precision airstrikes were carried out and 800 to 900 IS fighters were killed during the operation in Sirte between 1 August and 19 December 2016. On 18 January 2017, US B-2 bombers bombed two IS camps to the south of Sirte, killing ninety IS militants.

=== 2017 ===
According to the Syrian Observatory for Human Rights, Coalition airstrikes have killed 7,043 people across Syria, of which: 5,768 dead were IS fighters, 304 Al-Nusra Front militants and other rebels, 90 government soldiers and 881 civilians. The air strikes occurred in the period between 22 September 2014 and 23 January 2017.

In March 2017, various media outlets reported that conventional forces from the 11th MEU, as well as special operations forces of the 75th Ranger Regiment deployed to Syria to support U.S.-backed forces in liberating Raqqa from IS occupation. The deployment marked an escalation in the U.S. intervention in Syria.

By 28 February, the Coalition had conducted 3,271 sorties in 2017, 2,129 of which resulted in at least one weapon released. In total, the coalition released 7,040 weapons in Iraq and Syria in this same time period in an effort to destroy IS.

As of 9 August 2017, coalition aircraft flew a total of 167,912 sorties, and conducted 13,331 strikes in Iraq and 11,235 strikes in Syria, for a total of 24,566 strikes.

=== 2018 ===
In February 2018, the 2nd Brigade Combat Team, 101st Airborne Division was awarded a campaign streamer following its deployment to Iraq. In May 2016, the brigade deployed to advise and assist, train and equip Iraqi security forces to fight the Islamic State of Iraq. The 2nd Brigade also conducted precision surface-to-surface fires and supported a multitude of intelligence and logistical operations for coalition and Iraqi forces. They also provided base security throughout more than twelve areas of operations. The Brigade also aided in the clearance of IS from Fallujah, the near elimination of suicide attacks in Baghdad, and the introduction of improved tactics that liberated more than 100 towns and villages. The 2nd Brigade, 101st Airborne Division also played a significant role in the liberation of Mosul.

=== 2019 ===
In early 2019, the US-led coalition focused on the final assault on ISIS in the Euphrates pocket, including the Battle of Baghuz Fawqani in the first quarter of the year. Civilian human shields held by ISIS were among the victims, including in one reported massacre on 19 March in which up to 300 civilians, including 45 children, were alleged to have been killed by Coalition forces.

From 8 August 2014, to 29 August 2019, coalition aircraft conducted a total of 34,573 strikes.

On 27 October 2019, the US conducted a military operation codenamed Operation Kayla Mueller, which resulted in the death of the ISIS leader, Abu Bakr al-Baghdadi in Idlib Governorate. It was reported that al-Baghdadi detonated a suicide vest, killing himself and two children after being chased into a tunnel.

On 31 December 2019, the CJTF-OIR reported its forces were "closely monitoring the current situation of the protests at the US Embassy in Baghdad", adding that they were "taking the appropriate force protection measures to ensure [US Embassy personnel] safety".

=== 2020 ===
CJTF-OIR paused all training and anti-ISIS operations on 5 January 2020, to focus on protecting Iraqi bases hosting Coalition troops in the wake of several rocket attacks. This action was also linked to the anticipated response against Coalition forces in the wake of the killing of Iranian General Qasem Soleimani. In March 2020, the U.S. military started to withdraw from various bases in Iraq.

=== 2021 ===
On 31 March 2021, Carrier Air Wing Three launched naval flight operations in support of Operation Inherent Resolve. The USS Dwight D. Eisenhower and its carrier strike group were expected to lead Task Force 50, which oversees Operation Inherent Resolve's naval strike operations.

=== 2023 ===
On 3 April, U.S. forces killed senior Islamic State leader Khalid 'Aydd Ahmad al-Jabouri, who was allegedly planning attacks in Europe during Easter, in an overnight drone strike on the outskirts of rebel-held town of Killi, Idlib in northwest Syria.

On 9 July, US Central Command announced that a U.S. MQ-9 drone which had been harassed by Russian aircraft for almost two hours had on 7 July killed an ISIS leader called Usamah al-Muhajir, who had been riding his motorcycle on the road linking al-Bab with Bizaah.

On 24 August, the U.S. Military stated that Major General Joel 'JB' Vowell had assumed command of anti-ISIS operation also known as Operation Inherent Resolve, from Major General Matthew McFarlane.

On 20 November, the United States Central Command has announced that, in the months of September and October, it has conducted, along with coalition and other partners, a total of 79 operations in Iraq and Syria resulting in 13 ISIS operatives killed and 78 detained.

Breakdown by country
| Country | Operations | | ISIS operatives | |
| Country | Type | Count | Killed | Detained |
|---|---|---|---|---|
| Iraq | Partnered | 53 | 10 | 33 |
| Syria | Partnered | 23 | 3 | 45 |
| Syria | US-only | 3 | 3 | 45 |
| Total | | 79 | 13 | 78 |

Breakdown by month
| Month | Operations | ISIS operatives | |
| Month | Count | Killed | Detained |
|---|---|---|---|
| September | 31 | 8 | 19 |
| October | 48 | 5 | 59 |
| Total | 79 | 13 | 78 |

=== 2024 ===
On 30 August, United States Central Command reported that "[U.S.] forces and Iraqi Security Forces conducted a partnered raid in Western Iraq in the early hours of Aug. 29, resulting in the death of 15 ISIS operatives." It was later confirmed that 7 U.S. troopers were injured during the operation.

On 31 December, French Defense Minister Sébastien Lecornu reported that French forces had carried "targeted strikes against Daech" targets "on Syrian soil", dropping seven bombs on two targets on 29 December. Multiple planes and a drone executed the strike off from Prince Hassan Air Base in Jordania.

=== 2025 ===
On 1 January 2025, an American man inspired by ISIS killed 15 people and injured 57 in a truck attack in New Orleans. On 9 January, the Islamic State, in the 477th issue of its weekly newsletter "Al-Naba", praised the attack and Jabbar himself, calling on other supporters to follow in his footsteps.

In April 2025, the U.S. ordered a consolidation of its forces in Syria under OIR, reducing troop numbers from about 2,000 to under 1,000 at selected bases, primarily in northeastern Syria.

On July 21, 2025, U.S. Army Maj. Gen. Kevin C. Leahy officially transferred command of CJTF-OIR to Brig. Gen. Kevin J. Lambert at Union III, Iraq.

Withdrawal of U.S. ground forces from Baghdad and key military bases in Iraq in August 2025.

=== 2026 ===
In February 2026, U.S. President Donald Trump ordered the complete withdrawal of American forces from Syria within the next two months. American forces completed their withdrawal on 16 April 2026, when US troops evacuated the Qasrak base in the Hasakah region, marking the end of more than a decade of American military presence in Syria.

In June 2026, U.S. CENTCOM conducted an airstrike in northwestern Syria killing Ali Husayn al-Ulaywi, who was the current leader of ISIS in Syria at the time. This marked the first known time, post U.S. withdrawal that the United States has conducted an attack in Syria and on ISIS.

With the withdrawal of U.S. Troops from Iraq 30 September 2026, CJTF-OIR and Operation Inherent Resolve mission set was moved to Jordan and CENTCOM quoted "Combined Joint Task Force-Operation Inherent Resolve (CJTF-OIR) remains operational and is now headquartered in Jordan as U.S. forces continue the counter-ISIS mission in Syria alongside Coalition partners and the Syrian government."

== Assets ==
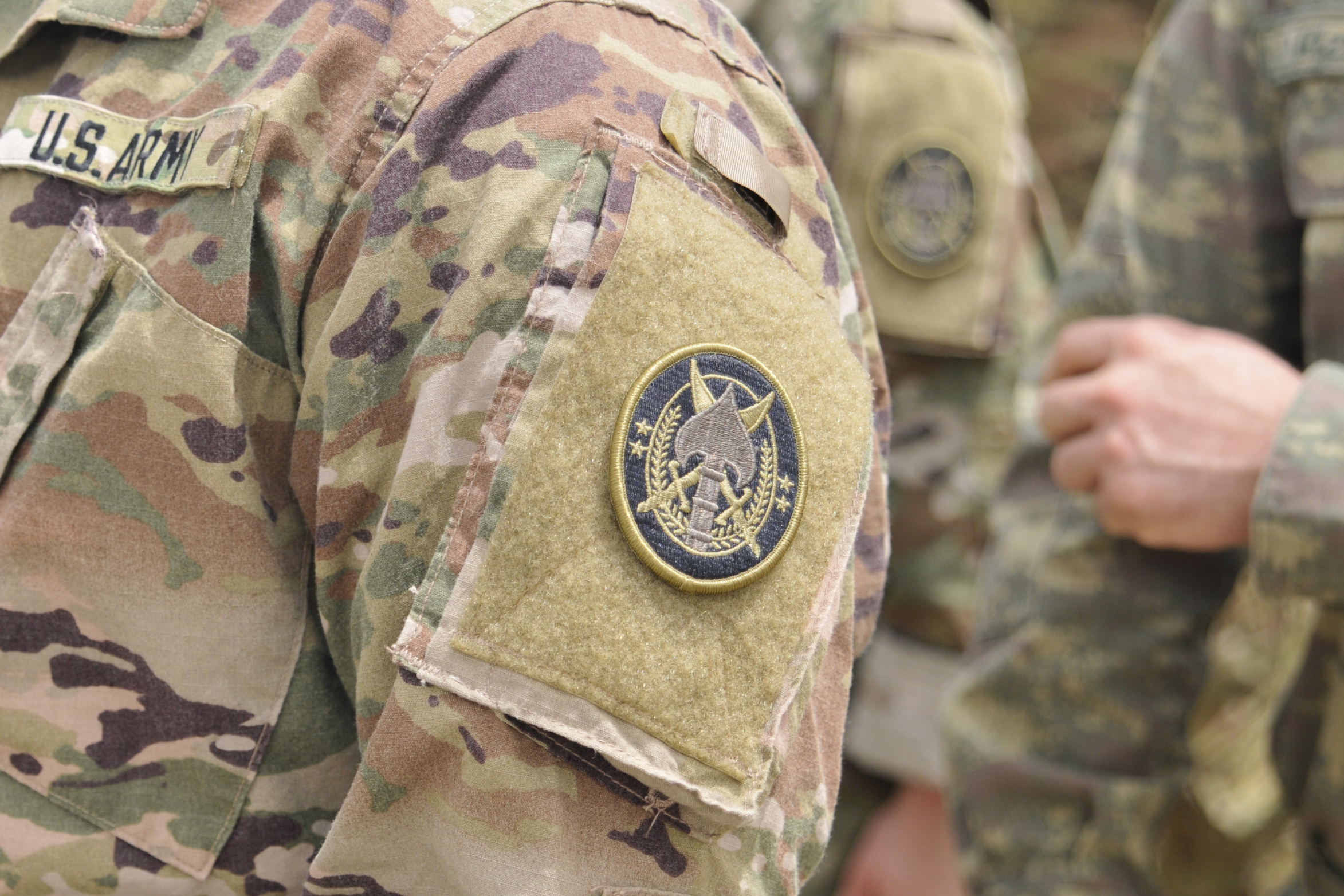
The Special Operations Joint Task Force – Operation Inherent Resolve patch in 2017

United States Air Force, United States Navy & United States Marine Corps units that are participating in this operations can be found in the aerial and ground order of battle.

United States Army

United States Navy

United States Air Force

United States Space Force

U.S. and coalition forces are training Iraqi forces at four sites: in al-Asad in Anbar province, Erbil in the north, and Taji and Besmayah in the Baghdad area.

Combined Joint Forces Land Component Command-Iraq

- 1st Infantry Division 1st Cavalry division

Division Headquarters and Headquarters Battalion

2-12 FA 4ID 1SBCT (January - October 2015)

- 3rd Brigade Combat Team, 82nd Airborne Division (January – September 2015).
  - 2nd Battalion, 505th Infantry Regiment
- 3rd Brigade Combat Team, 10th Mountain Division
- 1st Brigade Combat Team, 10th Mountain Division (September 2015 – June 2016).
- 2nd Brigade Combat Team, 101st Airborne Division (Air Assault) (June 2016 – January 2017).
  - 1st Battalion, 502nd Infantry Regiment
- 2nd Brigade Combat Team, 82nd Airborne Division (January 2017 – October 2017)
  - 2nd Battalion, 325th Airborne Infantry Regiment
- 2nd Battalion, 82nd Field Artillery Regiment (January 2017 – October 2017)
- 28th Expeditionary Combat Aviation Brigade, 28th Infantry Division
- 35th Combat Aviation Brigade, 35th Infantry Division (Summer 2018– Summer 2019)
- 3rd Cavalry Regiment (Spring 2018 – Spring 2019)

United States Marine Corps

- Marine Air-Ground Task Force (MAGTF)
- Special Purpose Marine Air-Ground Task Force – Crisis Response – Central Command

== Military bases ==
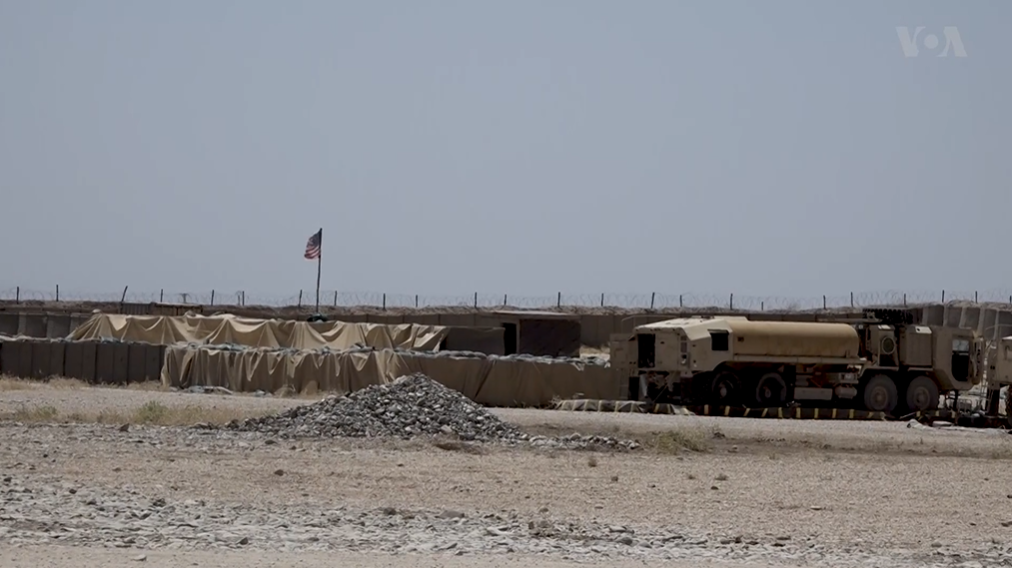
An SDF-U.S. military base in northeastern Syria, near Rmelan, in 2021.

During the operation in Syria, there were several bases mostly in the north:

- Al-Hasakah Governorate
  - Ash Shaddadi – scaled down, part of base vacated
  - Hasaka Dam – reduced US presence
  - Kharab al-Jeer near Al-Malikiyah
  - Rmelan (airbase)
  - Tal Tamir
  - Tell Beydar – vacated since 2023
- Aleppo Governorate
  - Ayn al-Arab – vacated October 2019
  - Dadat (outpost) – vacated October 2019
  - Harab Isk (airbase) – closed and destroyed in 2019 withdrawal strikes
  - Sabt (airbase) – vacated October 2019
  - Sarrin – vacated October 2019
  - Ushariya (outpost) – vacated October 2019
- Deir ez-Zor Governorate
  - al-Omar oil fields
  - Mission Support Site Conoco – a.k.a. Mission Support Site Euphrates, vacated May 2025
  - Mission Support Site Green Village – vacated May 2025
- Homs Governorate
  - Al-Tanf
- Raqqa Governorate
  - Ayn Issa – vacated 2019 following Turkish Offensive
  - Tabqa (airbase) – vacated 2019
  - Tal al-Samn – downsized 2019, unknown as of 2022

However, following the 2019 Turkish offensive into north-eastern Syria, most U.S. soldiers withdrew from northern Syria to western Iraq in October 2019, while even bombing their own Lafarge basement near Harab Isk.

Meanwhile, The New York Times reported that the Pentagon was planning to "leave 150 Special Operations forces at a base called al-Tanf". In addition, 200 U.S. soldiers would remain in eastern Syria near the oil fields, to prevent the Islamic State, Syrian government and Russian forces from advancing in the region. However, at least 600–900 U.S. Troops are expected to stay in Syria, in Al-Hasakah and Deir ez-Zor Governorates. In July 2020, the U.S. military built a new base including an airport, located between Um Kahif village and Tal Alu silos near Al-Yaarubiyah. On 19 December 2024 the US government released a statement regarding the true size of the US presence to be 2000 troops.

== Casualties ==
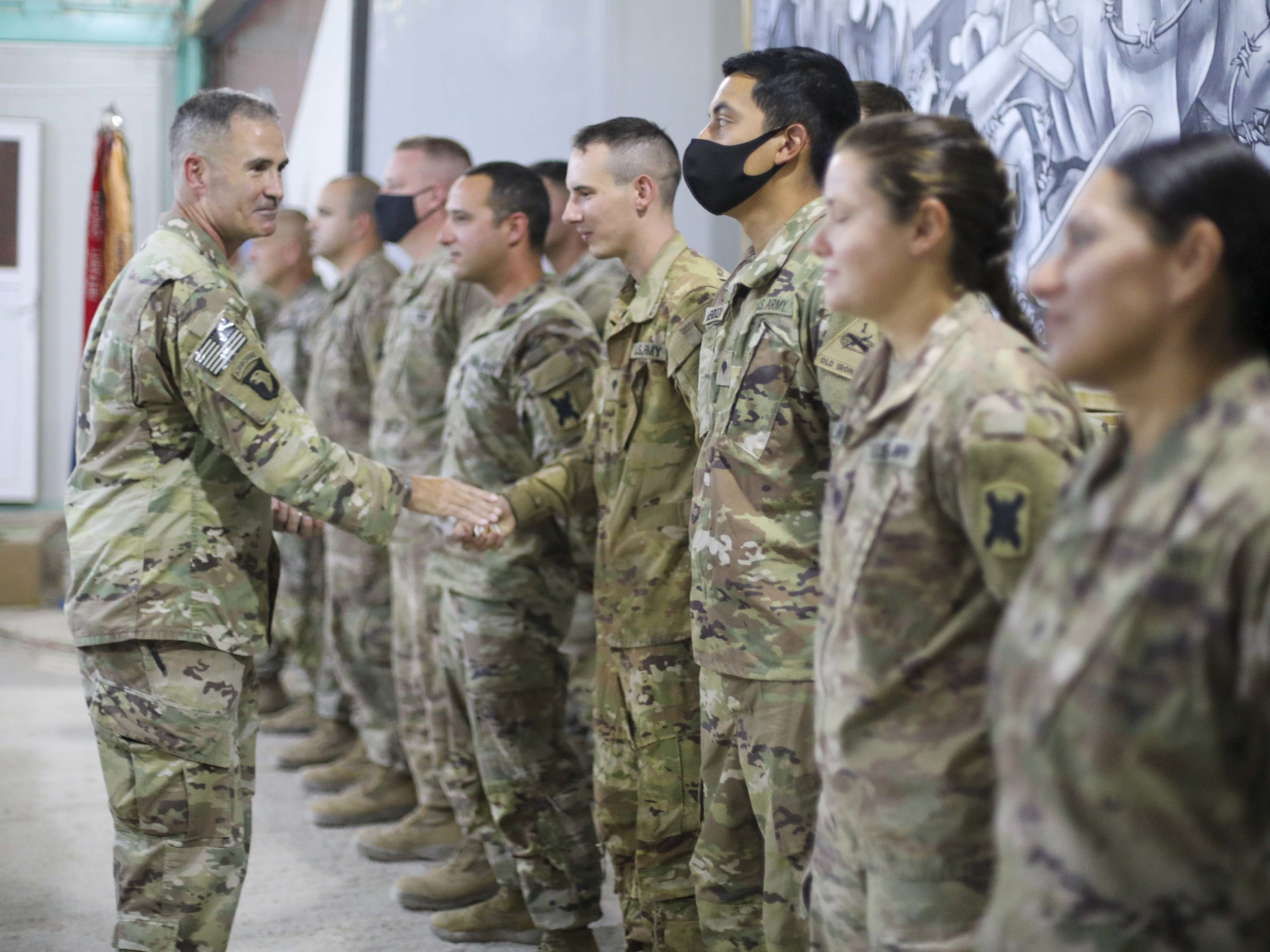
CJTF-OIR Command Sergeant Major Walter C. Puckett greets coalition personnel in Al-Hasakah, Syria on 18 August 2021

=== Combatants ===
American military casualties in Inherent Resolve totaled 118 dead (23 due to hostile action) and 496 wounded.

American and allied airstrikes killed tens of thousands of ISIL fighters in Iraq and Syria. The Syrian Observatory for Human Rights estimated a minimum of 9,200 ISIL fighters killed by airstrikes in the smaller Syrian theater alone by 2019, while noting that "the real number of casualties among ISIS and other Islamic factions is greater than what the Observatory has been able to document, given the intense secrecy of the targeted parties for their human losses." The American military gave its own data on the number of ISIS fighters killed in its strikes over time:

- March 2015: 8,500+ killed per Lloyd Austin
- September 2015: 20,000 killed per General Sean MacFarland
- February 2016: 27,000 killed per an unnamed U.S. official
- August 2016: 45,000 killed per General Sean MacFarland
- December 2016: 50,000 killed per an unnamed U.S. official
- February 2017: 60,000 killed per General Raymond Thomas
- July 2017: 70,000 killed per General Raymond Thomas
- October 2017: 80,000 killed per CENTCOM

These figures are do not take into account casualties inflicted by partnered ground forces with U.S. support.

=== Civilians ===
According to Airwars, in 2014 there were 63 incidents involving the US-led coalition in Iraq and Syria in which there were civilian casualties, causing at least 160 civilian deaths. In 2015, there were 268 incidents and 708 deaths. In 2016, there were 483 incidents and 1,372 deaths. Civilian casualties peaked in 2017, with 1,841 incidents and at least 4,677 civilian deaths.

According to Airwars, 1,472 civilians were killed by the U.S. air campaign in Iraq and Syria in March 2017 alone. On 17 March, a U.S.-led coalition airstrike in Mosul killed more than 200 civilians. Data compiled by Airwars shows that 229 strikes in Iraq and 878 strikes in Syria were carried out by Coalition forces in June 2017, killing an alleged total of 1,483 people. The reporting of 875 of those total alleged deaths is contested. In July 2017, Airwars recorded reports of an alleged 1,342 people were killed in Iraq and Syria by Coalition airstrikes. Of the allegations 812 were contested, and two were disproved.

Casualty figures fell after the 2017 peak. According to Airwars, 2018 saw 192 incidents and 846 deaths; 2019 saw 72 incidents and 467 deaths. In 2019, the casualties were concentrated in the first quarter during the Battle of Baghuz Fawqani including an alleged massacre of civilian human shields on 19 March.

By 2020, Airwars had recorded a five-year total of 14,771 US-led Coalition strikes in Iraq and 19,829 in Syria and investigated 2,921 alleged civilian casualty incidents, estimating 8,259–13,135 civilian deaths, of whom around 2,000 were children, although the Coalition itself estimated just 1,377 or 1,417 civilian deaths.

The New York Times reported that efforts to minimize and count civilian deaths fell far short of the approach promised by the US military for its use of airstrikes in the war against IS. The newspaper reported that airstrikes against IS, as well as in the war in Afghanistan, was marked by "flawed intelligence, poor targeting and thousands of civilian deaths." It also reported that efforts to minimize civilian casualties diminished after President Trump assumed office in 2017, stating "... the authority to approve strikes was pushed further down the chain of command, even as an overwhelming majority of strikes were carried out in the heat of war, and not planned far in advance." Finally, the paper reported that the US military systematically under-reported casualties, providing a total death count of 1,417, when the actual count was significantly higher. The report states that the military made little effort to accurately determine civilian casualties after the airstrikes. The military was also reluctant to divulge information about the casualties, in spite of promises of transparency, and news media were required to make numerous requests under the Freedom of Information Act, and had to repeatedly sue the US military to produce data.

During the years 2014 to 2019, an Air Force special operations group named Talon Anvil killed a significant number of non-combatant civilians, and often failed to follow US military protocols designed to minimize civilian casualties. In one particular strike, the March 2019 Baghuz airstrike, approximately 50 women and children were killed, and the Air Force subsequently covered the deaths up. The Talon Anvil group operated under the auspices of Task Force 9, which was the US military unit responsible for ground operations in the war against IS in Syria. The group consisted of about twenty plainclothes military personnel that operated out of anonymous office buildings in Iraq and Syria. In December 2021, the US Secretary of Defense ordered an investigation into the civilian deaths caused by Talon Anvil's bombing strikes.

== See also ==
- Combined Joint Task Force – Operation Inherent Resolve, commander headquarters of ongoing operations
  - Military intervention against the Islamic State aerial order of battle
- German intervention against the Islamic State, also named Operation Counter Daesh, related German operations
- Opération Chammal, name for similar French operations
- Operation Impact, name for similar Canadian operations
- Operation Martyr Yalçın, name for similar Turkish operation against IS
- Operation Okra, name for similar Australian operations
- Operation Shader, name for similar British operations
- Operation Tidal Wave II, name of a suboperation against IS oil infrastructure
- Operation Enduring Freedom, name for the first phase of the War in Afghanistan (2001–2021)
- US intervention in Somalia (2007–present)
- US airstrikes on Yemen
- March–May 2025 United States attacks in Yemen, codenamed Operation Rough Rider
- Operation Southern Spear, name for the US military operation in the eastern Pacific and Caribbean
