= Overseas Service Bar =

United States Army insignia

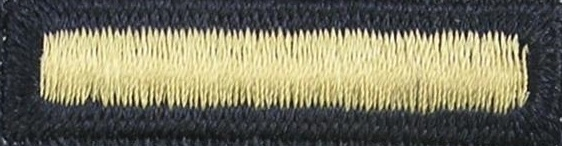
- Overseas Service Bar worn on a Global War on Terrorism era U.S. Army Service Uniform soldier's coat denoting between 6 and 11 months service under hostile conditions.
- Material: Cloth

An Overseas Service Bar is an insignia worn by United States Army soldiers on the Army Service Uniform, and previously on the Army Green (Class A) and the Army Blue (Dress Blue) uniforms, that indicates the recipient has served six months overseas in a theater of war.

Overseas Service Bars are displayed as an embroidered gold bar worn horizontally on the left sleeve of the Class A uniform and the Army Service Uniform. Overseas Service Bars are cumulative, in that each bar worn indicates another six-month period. Time spent overseas is also cumulative, meaning one bar could be earned for two separate deployments totaling six months.

The Overseas Service Bars shown here as ‘Korea’ were used as Overseas Service Bars in World War II.

== Origins ==
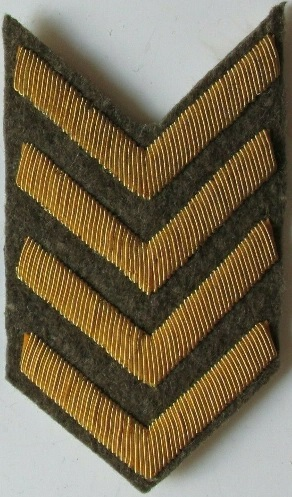
Four Overseas Chevrons.

The original concept of a uniform patch denoting overseas service bar began in the First World War with what was known as an War Service Chevron. An Overseas Chevron was an inverted chevron patch of golden thread on olive drab backing worn on the lower left sleeve on the standard Army dress uniform, above the service stripes. The chevron was identical to the red Wound Chevron which was worn on the opposite (right) sleeve. Wound Chevrons were replaced by the Purple Heart decoration upon its creation in 1932.

Originally, in 1917, service chevrons came in three colors -

- Silver Chevron Stateside War Service for 6 months.
- Gold Chevron Overseas War Service for 6 months.
- Sky Blue Cloth Chevron Overseas War Service for less than 6 months.

A soldier's overseas service was calculated from the day they disembarked in Britain or France. Sailors and Marines who served in the European war zone aboard a ship for 6 months (i.e., shipboard service) wore their chevron point-upwards. If they served ashore, they qualified for the Overseas War Service chevron. Overseas service chevrons were discontinued by the Navy and Marine Corps after the First World War.

On 30 June 1944, the War Department issued Circular No. 268, authorizing a bar-shaped uniform patch to symbolize overseas service during World War II. During WWII, it was often informally referred to as a "Hershey bar." The bar was 1/4 inch wide and 1 3/8 inches long, made of golden lace or bullion on an olive drab background, and golden cloth on a khaki background. The background formed a border 1/8 inch wide. The bar of golden lace or bullion was for wear on the service coat or field jacket, and the bar of golden cloth was for wear on the shirt. Time was computed between the dates of departure from the continental United States and the dates of arrival back to the United States, with the date of departure and date of arrival being counted. Time for the purposes of awarding a bar was calculated either continuously, or at intervals, from 7 December 1941 until "a date 6 months subsequent to the termination of the present war." The Territory of Alaska was considered outside the continental United States for calculating time, but service "on the Great Lakes and in any harbor, bay, or other enclosed arm of the sea along the coast, and that part of the sea which is within 3 miles of the coastline of the United States will not be included in computing length of service required." Time where personnel were deemed absent without leave or in a status amounting to desertion was subtracted from total time earned.

The bar or bars were to be worn centered on the outside of the left sleeve of the service coat, field jacket, or shirt, 4 inches from the sleeve opening. If service stripes (each signifying three years of honorable service for enlisted men) were worn on the service coat, the overseas service bars were to be worn immediately above them. For those who had also performed overseas service in the First World War, the overseas service bar and chevron were worn together.

On 2 February 1945, the War Department issued Circular No. 41, which rescinded paragraph 4b of Circular No. 268, 1944, and substituted for paragraph 2 that the background would be made of olive drab felt or "of the same material and color as the garment on which worn" and authorized overseas service bars for wear on the "service coat, winter and summer shirt, field jacket, work clothing, and special suits or jackets." The production of bars made of golden rayon was authorized.

In 1953, the Overseas Service Bar adopted its current name, and the patch was moved to be worn on the lower right sleeve, instead of the left.

Prior to the recent wars in Afghanistan and Iraq, it was rare for an individual to have more than four Overseas Service Bars. Due to the protracted nature of the recent conflicts with resulting multiple deployments, it is not unusual for senior officers and NCOs to have eight or more Overseas Service Bars.

The Overseas Service Bar is a separate award from the Overseas Service Ribbon, established in 1981, which recognizes overseas service in any location outside of the continental United States (CONUS), without regard as to whether or not the area has been designated a combat zone. Regulations permit receiving both awards for the same qualifying period of service.

== Wear ==
Army Regulation 670–1, Wear and Appearance of Army Uniforms and Insignia, dated 26 January 2021 in Chapter 21, Paragraph 29 states the following:

21–29. Overseas service bars

a. Authorized wearers. Soldiers are authorized to wear one overseas service bars for each 6–month period of active Federal service as a member of a U.S. Service as indicated below. Periods of less than 6 months duration, which otherwise meets the requirements for the award of overseas service bars, may be combined by adding the number of months to determine creditable service toward the total number of overseas service bars authorized. Listed beginning dates and ending dates are inclusive. The months of arrival to, and departure from the designated area are counted as whole months.

(1) Outside CONUS, between 7 December 1941 and 2 September 1946. An overseas service bar is not authorized for a fraction of a 6–month period.

(2) Korea, between 27 June 1950 and 27 July 1954. Credit toward an overseas service bar is authorized for each month of active Federal service as a member of the U.S. Army serving in the designated hostile fire area in Korea between 1 April 1968 and 31 August 1973. The months of arrival to, and departure from the hostile fire pay area are counted as whole months. If a Soldier receives a month of hostile fire pay for a period(s) of service in Korea, then the Soldier may also receive credit for a corresponding month towards award of an overseas service bar.

(3) Vietnam, between 1 July 1958 and 28 March 1973. The months of arrival to, and departure from Vietnam are counted as whole months for credit toward the overseas service bar. If a Soldier receives a month of hostile fire pay for a period(s) of TDY service in Vietnam, then the Soldier may also receive credit for a corresponding month towards award of an overseas service bar.

(4) The Dominican Republic, between 29 April 1965 and 21 September 1966. The months of arrival to, and departure from the Dominican Republic are counted as whole months.

(5) Laos, between 1 January 1966 and 28 March 1973. The months of arrival to, and departure from Laos are counted as whole months.

(6) Cambodia between 1 January 1971 and 28 March 1973. Personnel must qualify for hostile fire pay to receive credit for an overseas service bar. The months of arrival to, and departure from the hostile fire pay area are counted as whole months.

(7) Lebanon, between 6 August 1983 and 24 April 1984, for the two units listed in paragraph 21–18c(6). The months of arrival to, and departure from Lebanon are counted as whole months.

(8) The Persian Gulf between 27 July 1987 and 1 August 1990, for Operation Earnest Will. The months of arrival to, and departure from the Persian Gulf are counted as whole months.

(9) The Persian Gulf between 17 January 1991 and 31 August 1993, for Operation Desert Storm. The months of arrival to, and departure from the Persian Gulf are counted as whole months.

(10) El Salvador, between 1 January 1981 and 1 February 1992. The months of arrival to, and departure from El Salvador are counted as whole months.

(11) Somalia, between 5 December 1992 and 31 March 1995. The months of arrival to, and departure from Somalia are counted as whole months.

(12) Participation in OEF, in the USCENTCOM area of operations, and under the control of the Combatant Commander, USCENTCOM, between 11 September 2001 and 31 December 2014; OEF-Philippines, in the Philippines, between 19 September 2001 and 31 December 2014; OEF-Horn of Africa, in Djibouti, between 1 January 2008 and 31 December 2014. The months of arrival to, and departure from the Philippines, Djibouti, or the USCENTCOM area of operations are counted as whole months.

(13) Participation in OIF, in the USCENTCOM area of operations, and under the control of the Combatant Commander, USCENTCOM, between 19 March 2003 and 31 August 2010. The months of arrival to, and departure from the USCENTCOM area of operations are counted as whole months.

(14) Participation in OND in the USCENTCOM area of operations, and under the control of the Combatant Commander, USCENTCOM, between 1 September 2010 and 31 December 2011. The months of arrival to, and departure from the USCENTCOM area of operations are counted as whole months.

(15) Participation in OIR, in the USCENTCOM area of operations, and under the control of the Combatant Commander, USCENTCOM, between 15 June 2014 and a date to be determined. The months of arrival to, and departure from the USCENTCOM area of operations are counted as whole months.

(16) Participation in OFS, in the USCENTCOM area of operations, and under the control of the Combatant Commander, USCENTCOM, or Djibouti, AFRICOM, between 1 January 2015 and a date to be determined. The months of arrival to, and departure from Djibouti or the USCENTCOM area of operations are counted as whole months.

b. How worn. See DA Pam 670–1.

== Notable recipients ==
- General of the Army Douglas MacArthur was awarded a total of 14 overseas service insignias - 3 gold chevrons for World War I, 9 overseas service bars for World War II and 2 for the Korean War. He was one of a very few United States service members who was not a prisoner of war to spend the entirety of World War II overseas.
- General George S. Patton was awarded a total of 10 overseas service insignias - 4 chevrons for World War I and 6 for World War II.
- General Jonathan Wainwright IV was awarded a total of 11 overseas service insignias - 4 chevrons for World War I and 7 overseas service bars for World War II.
- General William Westmoreland was awarded a total of 16 overseas service bars - 6 for World War II, 2 for Korea and 8 for Vietnam.
- General Mark J. O'Neil has been awarded 12 overseas service bars.
- Generals Austin S. Miller and Raymond A. Thomas were each awarded 13 overseas service bars.
- General Paul LaCamera received 18 overseas service bars.
- Colonel Floyd James Thompson, a Green Beret, served a total of 9 years and three months in Vietnam with all but three months served as a prisoner of war. He was awarded a total of 18 overseas service bars.
