= 86th Expeditionary Signal Battalion =

86th Signal Battalion
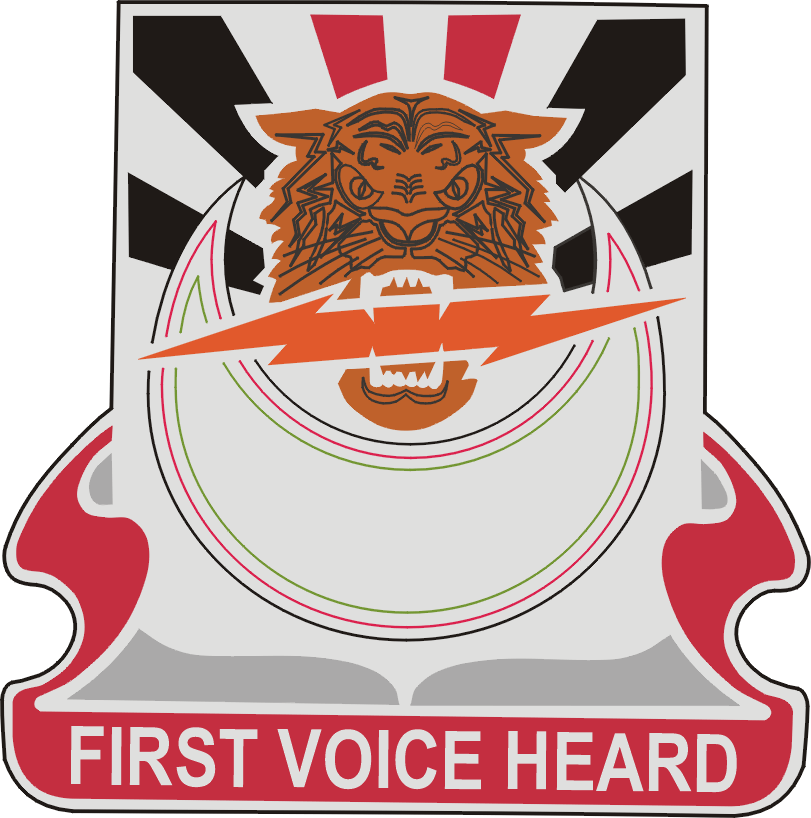
- 86th Signal Battalion Distinctive Unit Insignia
- Active: 23 March 1966– 30 April 1971; 1 July 1977 - present
- Country: United States
- Branch: United States Army
- Size: Battalion
- Part of: 11th Signal Brigade
- Garrison/HQ: Fort Bliss
- Nickname: "Tigers"
- Mottos: "First Voice Heard!" "Loud and Clear!"
- Engagements: Vietnam War; Gulf War; Operation Enduring Freedom; Operation Iraqi Freedom

The 86th Signal Battalion ("Tigers") of the United States Army is an element of 11th Signal Brigade. It is based at Fort Bliss, Texas. The unit mascot is the Tiger.

== Mission ==
The 86th Expeditionary Signal Battalion enables mission command for supported units, without Signal assets. The Battalion engineers, installs, operates, maintains, and defends network communications in support of Combatant Commanders and Joint Force Land Component Commanders. The battalion currently provides support to the Brigade Modernization Command and 1st Armored Division during the Network Integration Evaluation (NIE) held bi-annually in the Spring and Fall at Fort Bliss, TX and White Sands Missile Range, NM.

== History ==
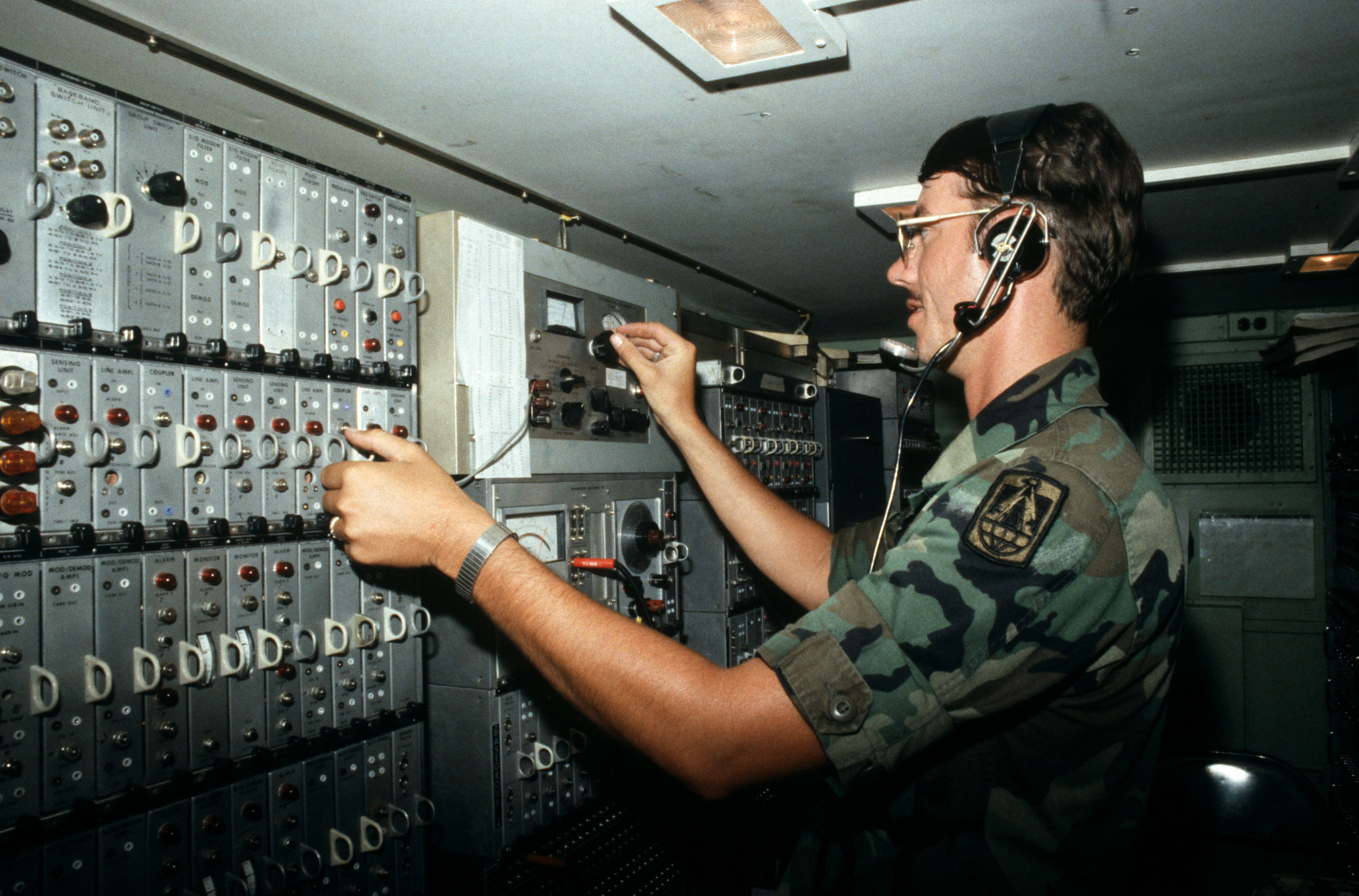
A member of the 86th Signal Battalion operates communication equipment in a signal van during Exercise GALLANT EAGLE 86.

The 86th Signal Battalion was first constituted on 23 March 1966 in the Regular Army as Headquarters and Headquarters Detachment, 86th Signal Battalion. The battalion was officially activated on 1 June 1966 at Fort Bragg, NC. The battalion deployed to Vietnam from 1967 through 1971. On 30 April 1971 the battalion was officially deactivated in Vietnam.

The battalion was re-activated on 1 July 1977 at Fort Huachuca, AZ as Headquarters and Headquarters Company, 86th Signal Battalion.

In April 2011 the battalion returned from a deployment from Afghanistan. Shortly after the deployment the battalion completed a BRAC move to Fort Bliss, TX.

== Subordinate units ==
The 86th Signal Battalion is an Expeditionary Signal Battalion or "ESB". It comprises the following units:

- Headquarters and Headquarters Company (HHC)
- A Company (Expeditionary Signal Company)
- B Company (Expeditionary Signal Company)
- C Company (Area Signal Company)

== Capabilities ==
In the Spring of 2014 the battalion was fielded with Warfighter Information Network - Tactical Increment 1b (WIN-T Inc 1b). The battalion was the first ESB to be fielded with WIN-T Inc 1b. WIN-T Inc 1b, introduced the Network Centric Waveform into the tactical network which optimizes bandwidth and removed the military's reliance on costly civilian satellite services. It also introduced the colorless network. The colorless network enables the encryption of unclassified data when transmitted it over satellite and line of sight.

== Honors ==
=== Unit decorations ===
Ribbon	Award	Year	Notes
	Meritorious Unit Commendation (Army)	1966-1987	for service in Vietnam
	Meritorious Unit Commendation (Army)	1990–1991	for service in Desert Storm
	Meritorious Unit Commendation (Army)	2002–2004	for service in Afghanistan
	Meritorious Unit Commendation (Army)	2006–2007	for service in Iraq
	Meritorious Unit Commendation (Army)	2010–2011	for service in Afghanistan

=== Campaign streamers ===
Conflict	Campaign	Year(s)
Vietnam War	Counteroffensive II	1966–1967
Vietnam War	Counteroffensive III	1967–1968
Vietnam War	Tet Counteroffensive	1968
Vietnam War	Counteroffensive IV	1968
Vietnam War	Counteroffensive V	1968
Vietnam War	Counteroffensive VI	1968–1969
Vietnam War	Tet 69 Counteroffensive	1969
Vietnam War	Summer - Fall 1969	1969
Vietnam War	Winter - Spring 1970	1970
Vietnam War	Sanctuary Counteroffensive	1970
Vietnam War	Counteroffensive VII	1971
Operation Enduring Freedom	Consolidation I	2002–2004
Operation Iraqi Freedom	National Resolution	2006–2007
Operation Enduring Freedom	Consolidation III	2010–2011
