= Bernard E. Trainor =

United States Marine Corps general and journalist

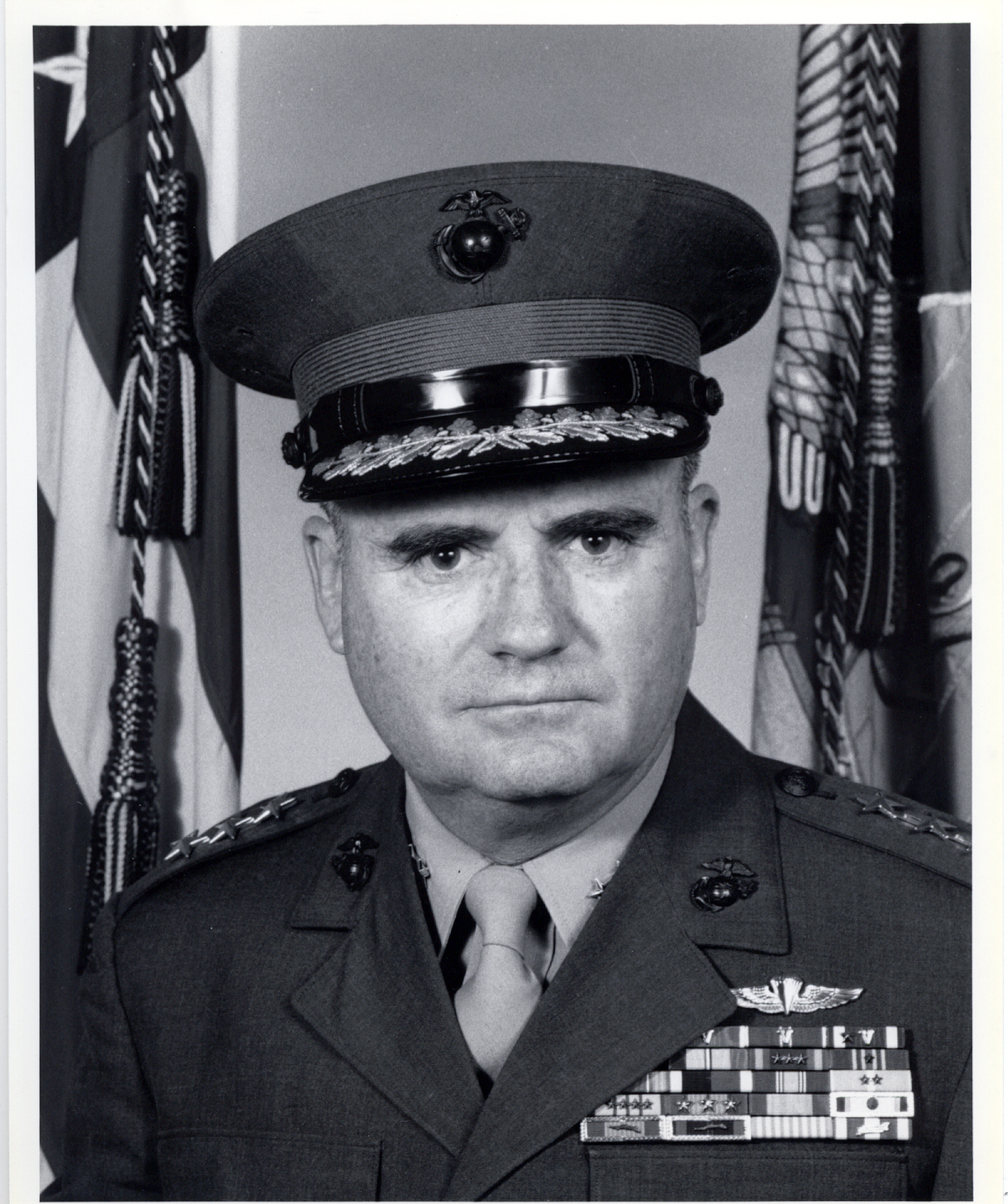
- Born: September 2, 1928; New York City, New York, U.S.
- Died: June 2, 2018 (aged 89); Sterling, Virginia, U.S.
- Education: College of the Holy Cross (BA); University of Colorado Boulder (MA)
- Spouse: Margaret Trainor
- Relatives: Kathleen Trainor, Theresa Trainor, Saxon Trainor, Claire Trainor Leimone
- Military career
- Allegiance: United States of America
- Branch: United States Marine Corps
- Service years: 1946–1985
- Rank: Lieutenant General
- Commands: 1st Battalion, 5th Marines; 1st Reconnaissance Battalion
- Conflicts: Vietnam War; Korean War
- Awards: Distinguished Service Medal; Legions of Merit (Valor, 2); Bronze Star (Valor); Navy Commendation Medal (Valor); Combat Action Ribbon
- Other work: Journalist; Television commentator Author

Bernard E. Trainor (September 2, 1928 – June 2, 2018) was an American journalist and a United States Marine Corps lieutenant general. He served in the Marine Corps for 39 years in both staff and command capacities. After retiring from the Marine Corps, he began working as the chief military correspondent for The New York Times. He was subsequently a military analyst for NBC. With Michael R. Gordon, he was the author of three accounts of American wars in Iraq, The Generals War (1995); Cobra II (2006); and Endgame (2012).

== Early life and military career ==
Trainor was born on September 2, 1928, in the Bronx, New York City.

In 1946, Trainor enlisted in the United States Marine Corps after high school and served until his selection as a midshipman in the Naval Reserve Officer Training Corps (NROTC) in 1947. He then attended the College of the Holy Cross, where he earned his Bachelor of Arts degree in history and was commissioned a Marine second lieutenant upon graduation in June 1951.

He then went to The Basic School in Marine Corps Base Quantico, Virginia, and after completion in December 1951, he was assigned to the 1st Battalion 1st Marines, 1st Marine Division in Korea, where he served as an infantry platoon commander. Returning to the United States in September 1952, he served with the 8th Marines, 2nd Marine Division, Camp Lejeune, North Carolina.

In June, 1953, he was assigned duties aboard the heavy cruiser USS Columbus, where he served consecutively as executive officer and commanding officer of the ship's Marine Detachment. During this two-year tour of duty, he was promoted to captain.

Following sea duty, Trainor was assigned to the Personnel Department at Headquarters Marine Corps until 1958. He was then assigned as an exchange officer to the British Royal Marine Commandos. After a period of training in the United Kingdom, he commanded a company in 45 Commando, 3 Commando Brigade, on Malta.

Upon completion of the exchange tour in 1959, he reported for duties with the 1st Marine Division, Camp Pendleton, California, where he served consecutively as a company commander in reconnaissance, anti-tank, and infantry battalions.

In 1961 he was ordered to duties as an instructor with the NROTC unit at the University of Colorado, where he would also complete a Master of Arts degree in history. He was promoted to major in November, 1961. His next assignment returned him to Quantico, where he was a student at the Marine Corps Command and Staff College. Ordered to the Republic of Vietnam in July 1965, Major Trainor was assigned as an advisor to a Vietnamese special operations group. After a year in Vietnam, he was promoted to lieutenant colonel and returned to Quantico, where he served for three years as an instructor at the Command and Staff College.

In 1969, Trainor attended the Air War College, Maxwell Air Force Base, Alabama. During his War College course he was awarded the Anderson Memorial Award for the "best paper dealing with politico-military thought" and designated a "Distinguished Graduate" upon completion of the course in June 1970. He then served another tour in the Republic of Vietnam, where he commanded the 1st Battalion 5th Marines, and later the 1st Reconnaissance Battalion of the 1st Marine Division.

Following his return to the United States in 1971, Trainor was assigned to Headquarters Marine Corps, where he served as a plans officer. During this tour, he was promoted to colonel on January 3, 1972. From July 1974 through June 1975, he served as Deputy Director of the 1st Marine Corps District, headquartered in New York. On July 1, 1975, he assumed duties as Director and held this post until his advancement to brigadier general in April 1976. At this time, he assumed duties as assistant depot commander, Marine Corps Recruit Depot Parris Island, South Carolina.

On April 14, 1978, he assumed the duties of deputy for education/director, education center, Marine Corps Development and Education Command, Quantico. During this tour of duty, he was promoted to major general. He was subsequently transferred to Headquarters Marine Corps in April 1981 and assigned duty as director, Plans Division, Plans, Policies and Operations Department. Upon promotion to lieutenant general on June 15, 1983, he was assigned duty as the deputy chief of staff for plans, policies and operations, Headquarters Marine Corps. He served in this capacity until his retirement on July 1, 1985.

== Journalism career ==
General Trainor worked for The New York Times as chief military correspondent from 1986 to 1990, covering events in Central America and Africa. He then joined Harvard University's John F. Kennedy School of Government as Director of the National Security Program from 1990 to 1996.

Later, he was a Senior Fellow for National Security for the Council on Foreign Relations. During that time, Trainor appeared frequently on national news media as an expert on military and foreign affairs. He covered the invasion of Iraq for NBC and MSNBC. He and Michael R. Gordon have written three books together: The Generals' War, which covers the 1991 Gulf War, Cobra II, which covers the Iraq War begun in 2003 and concludes with The Endgame: The Inside Story of the Struggle for Iraq, from George W. Bush to Barack Obama.

== Awards and honors ==

Navy and Marine Corps Parachutist Insignia
1st Row	Navy Distinguished Service Medal		Legion of Merit w/ 1 award star & valor device	Bronze Star w/ valor device
2nd Row	Navy and Marine Corps Commendation Medal w/ 1 award star & valor device	Combat Action Ribbon	Navy Unit Commendation w/ 3 service stars	Navy Meritorious Unit Commendation w/ 1 service star
3rd Row	World War II Victory Medal	Navy Occupation Service Medal	National Defense Service Medal w/ 1 service star	Korean Service Medal w/ 2 service stars
4th Row	Vietnam Service Medal w/ 4 service stars	Vietnam Gallantry Cross w/ 3 gold stars	Vietnam Armed Forces Honor Medal	Korean Presidential Unit Citation
5th Row	Vietnam Gallantry Cross unit citation	Vietnam Civil Actions unit citation	United Nations Korea Medal	Vietnam Campaign Medal

== Additional Awards ==
In addition to his military service awards, General Trainor received the Sanctae Crucis Award for Christian Leadership from the College of the Holy Cross in 2008. In 2013 the American Veterans Center chose him to receive the Andrew J. Goodpaster Award for military thought and performance. The Foreign Policy Research Institute established the Lt. Gen. Bernard E. Trainor USMC Veterans Fellowship in 2017. In May 2018 the 1st Reconnaissance Battalion Association and the Marine Corps Gazette announced the Lt Gen Bernard E. "Mick" Trainor Military Writing Award.

== Bibliography ==
- The Endgame: The Inside Story of the Struggle for Iraq, from George W. Bush to Barack Obama (2013) ISBN 9780307388940 OCLC 819383400
- Cobra II: The Inside Story of the Invasion and Occupation of Iraq (2006) (co-written with Michael R. Gordon) ISBN 0-375-42262-5
- The Generals' War: The Inside Story of the Conflict in the Gulf (1995) ISBN 0-316-32100-1
- A History of the Marine Corps (Rand McNally, 1968)
