= Cobra II =

2006 book by Michael R. Gordon

Cobra II: The Inside Story of the Invasion and Occupation of Iraq
- Author: Michael R. Gordon and Bernard E. Trainor
- Language: English
- Subject: 2003 invasion of Iraq
- Publisher: Pantheon Books
- Publication date: 2006
- Publication place: United States
- Pages: 603
- ISBN: 0-375-42262-5
- OCLC: 65200842

Cobra II: The Inside Story of the Invasion and Occupation of Iraq is a 2006 book written by Michael R. Gordon, chief military correspondent for The New York Times, and Bernard E. Trainor, a retired Marine Corps lieutenant general, which details the behind-the-scenes decision-making leading to the invasion of Iraq in 2003. It then follows, in depth, the invasion itself and the early months of the occupation through summer 2003.

The authors had access to a wide range of materials, including many classified documents, and access to the highest levels of the US and Iraqi government and military. They describe in detail the meetings, correspondence, and positions of the various actors, including not only the US and Iraq, but other countries across the world as they considered the implications of joining the "Coalition of the Willing".

A large part of the book is dedicated to describing the internal meetings and perspectives of Iraqi leadership. Predominant among the actors described are the US and Iraqi generals, Defense Secretary Donald Rumsfeld, and President George W. Bush and their closest staff members. The book reconstructs the principal battles from primary sources including many interviews with both military leadership and front-line soldiers. Also discussed are the failures of US intelligence and the paucity of planning concerning post-war operations.

== Themes ==
Gordon and Trainor argue broadly that America's Iraq War difficulties came from five major failures: "the misreading of the foe", "the overreliance on technological advancement", "the failure to adapt to developments on the battlefield", "the dysfunction of American military structures", and "the Bush Administration's disdain for nation-building".
