= Michael R. Gordon =

American foreign policy expert, journalist and author

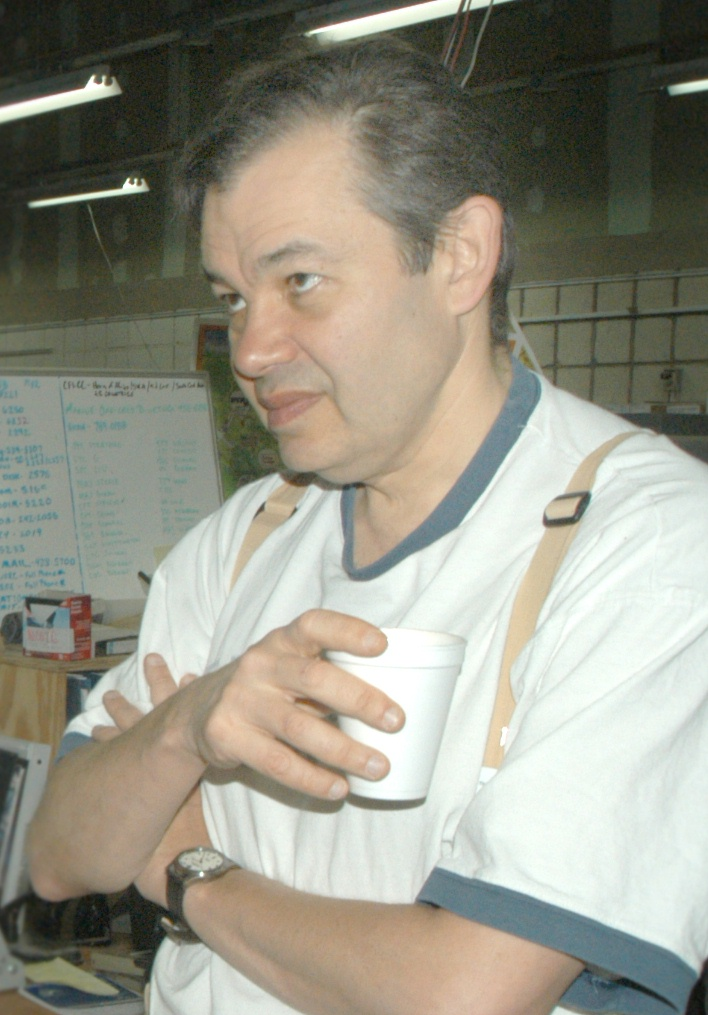
Gordon in Kuwait in April 2003

Michael R. Gordon has been a national security correspondent for The Wall Street Journal since October 2017. Previously, he was a military and diplomacy correspondent for The New York Times for 32 years. During the first phase of the Iraq War, he was the only newspaper reporter embedded with the allied land command under General Tommy Franks, a position that "granted him unique access to cover the invasion strategy and its enactment". He and General Bernard E. Trainor have written three books together, including the best-selling Cobra II. As journalists for The New York Times and citing anonymous U.S. officials, Gordon and Judith Miller were the first to report Saddam Hussein's alleged nuclear weapons program in September 2002 with the article "U.S. Says Hussein Intensifies Quest for A-Bomb Parts."

== As an author ==
Gordon has written or co-written (with Bernard Trainor) four books: The Generals' War, which covers the 1991 Gulf War; Cobra II, which covers the Iraq War begun in 2003; The Endgame, which details the U.S. struggle for Iraq from the aftermath of the invasion and the decision to "Surge" under the Bush administration, to the withdrawal of American troops under President Obama; and Degrade and Destroy: The Inside Story of the War Against the Islamic State, from Barack Obama to Donald Trump.

The General's War won high praise from several critics and decisionmakers, with then Defense Secretary Dick Cheney describing it as "a fascinating account of the war" that he would "recommend" "as something that gives them a different element of some of the key decisions that were made." Jim Lehrer described it as "A superb account and analysis of what went right and what went wrong in the Gulf War"; and Eliot Cohen, writing in Foreign Affairs, called it "the best single volume on the Gulf War."

Cobra II, which "focuses on the rushed and haphazard preparations for war and the appalling relations between the major players," won praise from Lawrence Freedman in Foreign Affairs, who wrote that "the research is meticulous and properly sourced, the narrative authoritative, the human aspects of conflict never forgotten." Gordon's paper, The New York Times, called it "a work of prodigious research", adding that it "will likely become the benchmark by which other histories of the Iraq invasion are measured." The New Republic, while calling the book "splendid", wrote that "Gordon and Trainor remain imprisoned in an almost exclusively military analysis of what went wrong ... (which) ... unintentionally underplays the essential problem in Iraq--the problem of politics."

== Rabta articles ==
From West Germany on New Years Day in 1989, Gordon, together with Steven Engelberg broke the news that Imhausen-Chemie, a West German chemical company, had been serving as the "prime contractor" for an alleged Libyan chemical weapons production plant at Rabta since April 1980. The article was based a leak to Gordon "by U.S. administration officials of data that the United States previously had asked West Germany to keep secret". The German government initially denied the allegations, but following further reports on the Rabta plants and pressure from the US administration, a total of three Imhausen employees, including the director, were convicted of illegally supplying CW materials to Libya in October 1991 and a fourth German national was convicted in 1996 for "facilitating Libya's acquisition of computer technology and other equipment to enhance chemical weapons development".

Gordon and Engelberg won a George Polk Award for international reporting following their series of articles.

== Bibliography ==
- The Generals' War: The Inside Story of the Conflict in the Gulf (with Bernard E. Trainor, 1996), ISBN 1843543540
- Cobra II: The Inside Story of the Invasion and Occupation of Iraq (with Bernard E. Trainor, 2006), ISBN 1843543524
- The Endgame: The Inside Story of the Struggle for Iraq, from George W. Bush to Barack Obama (with Bernard E. Trainor, 2013), ISBN 1843547805
- Degrade and Destroy: The Inside Story of the War Against the Islamic State, from Barack Obama to Donald Trump (2022), ISBN 0374279896
