= Coalition Forces Land Component Command =

Military forces under joint command

Coalition Forces Land Component Command, or CFLCC, is a command directing all land forces of different allied countries on behalf of a combatant commander or Joint task force commander.

In U.S. military terminology, Unified Combatant Commands or Joint Task Forces can have components from all services and components – Army ~, Air, Naval, Marine, and Special Operations. Thus a Land Component Command is a command directing all land forces on behalf of a combatant commander or JTF commander.

Coalition, or sometimes 'Combined', means armed services of different countries are involved. Thus a Coalition Forces Land Component Command is a multinational land force, usually operating as part of a U.S. combatant command, though it could theoretically be applied by other Western and U.S. allied nations.

== CFLCC During 'Iraqi Freedom' ==
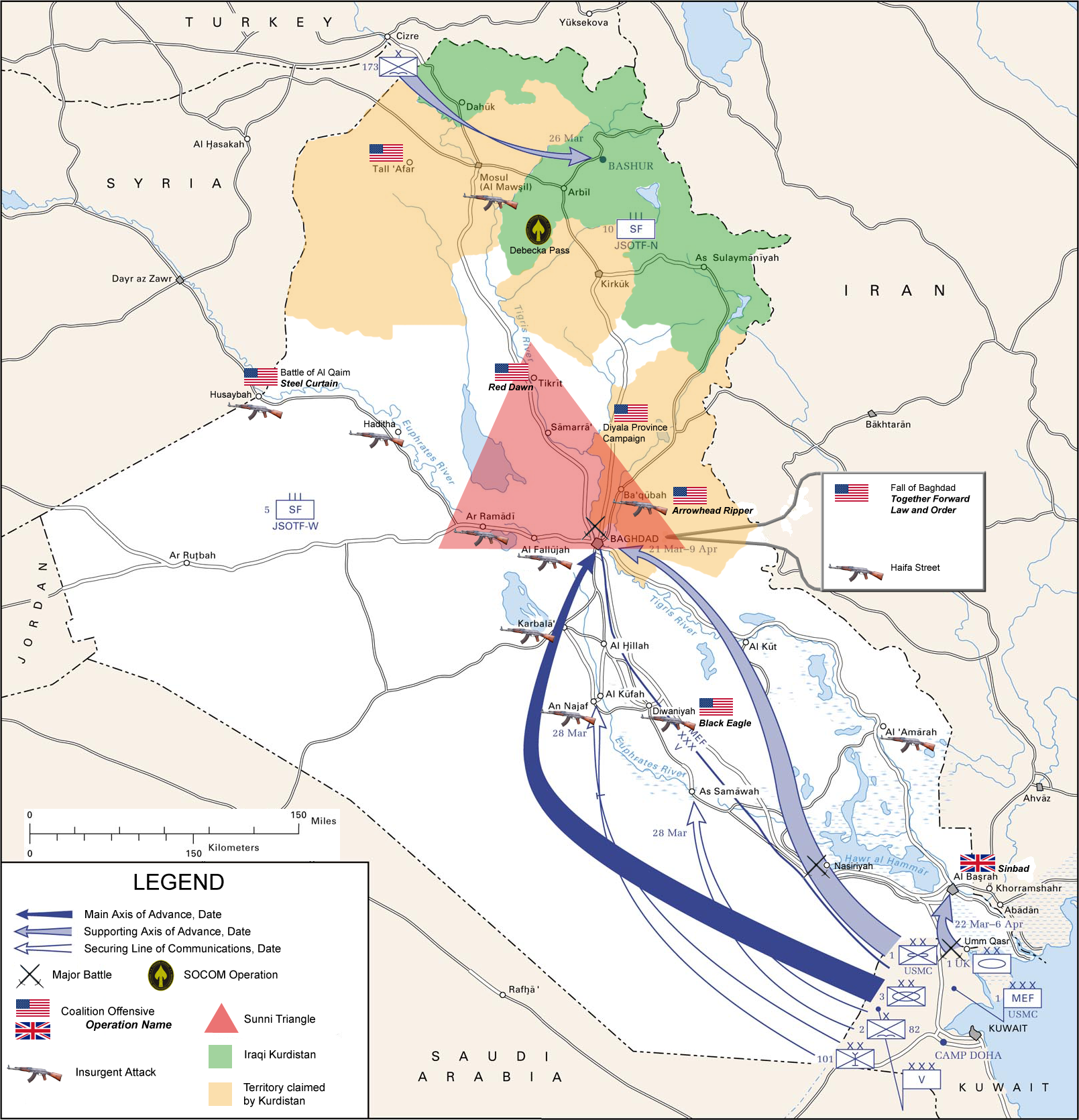
Invasion routes and major battles fought by the coalition and afterwards

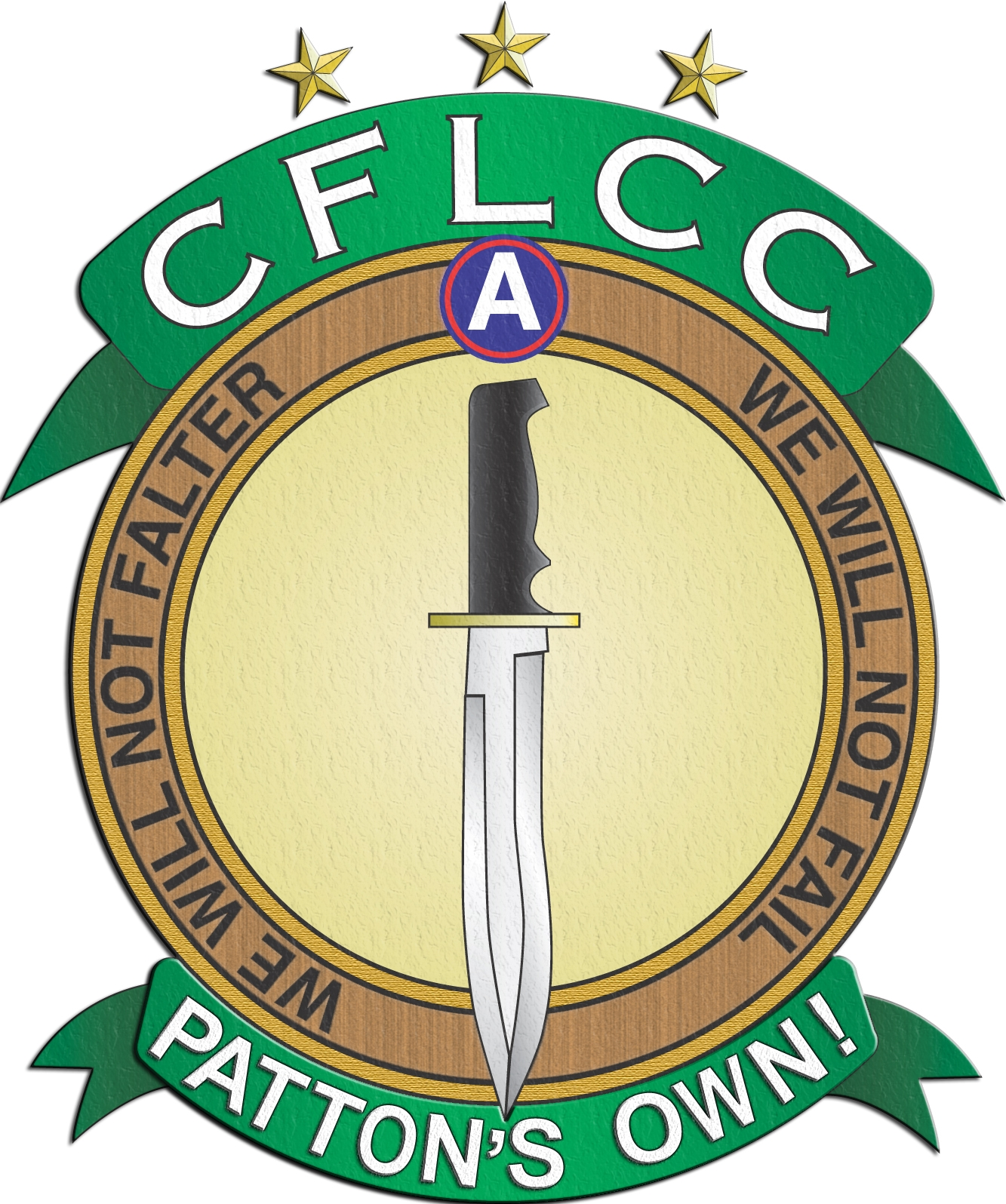
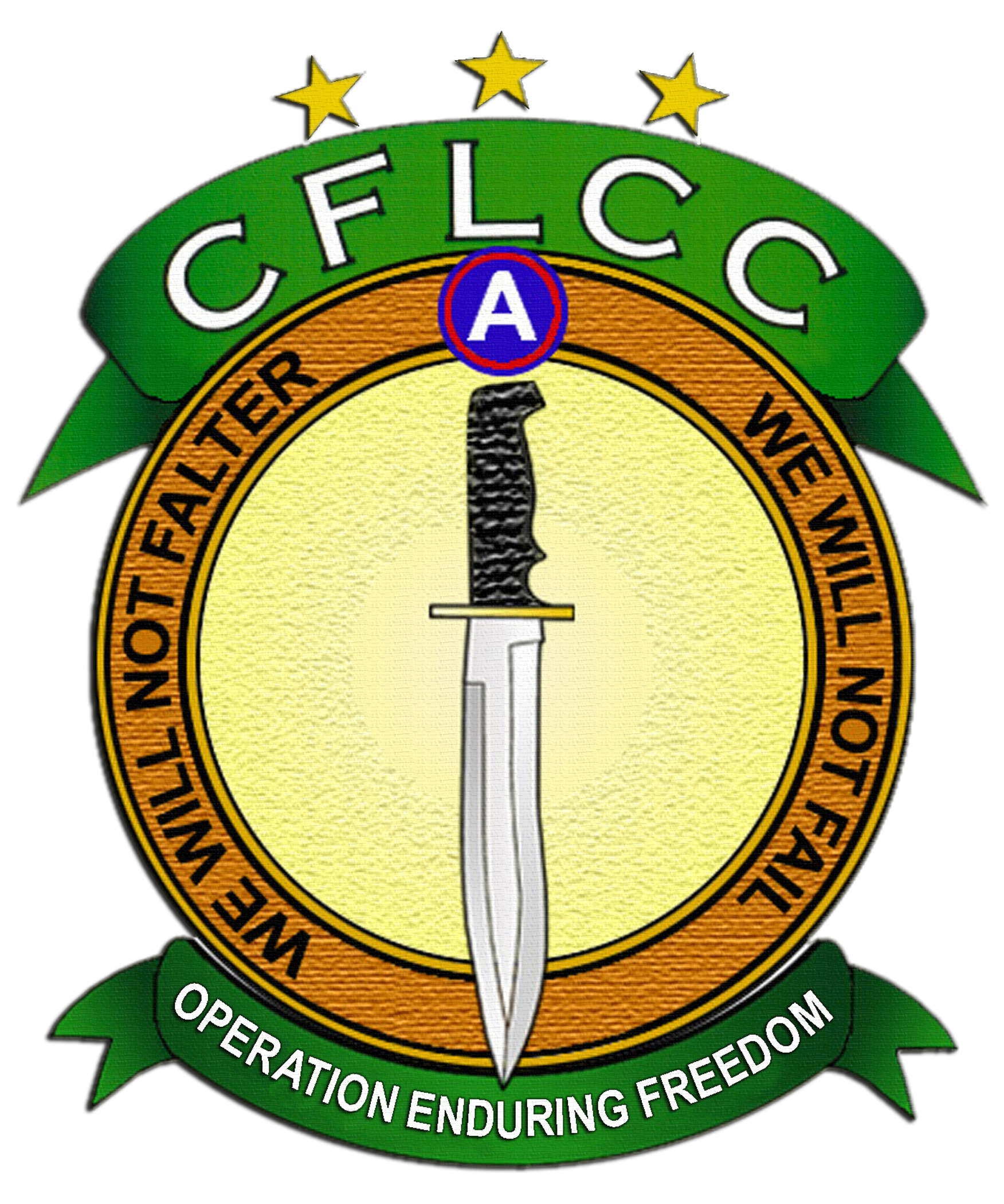
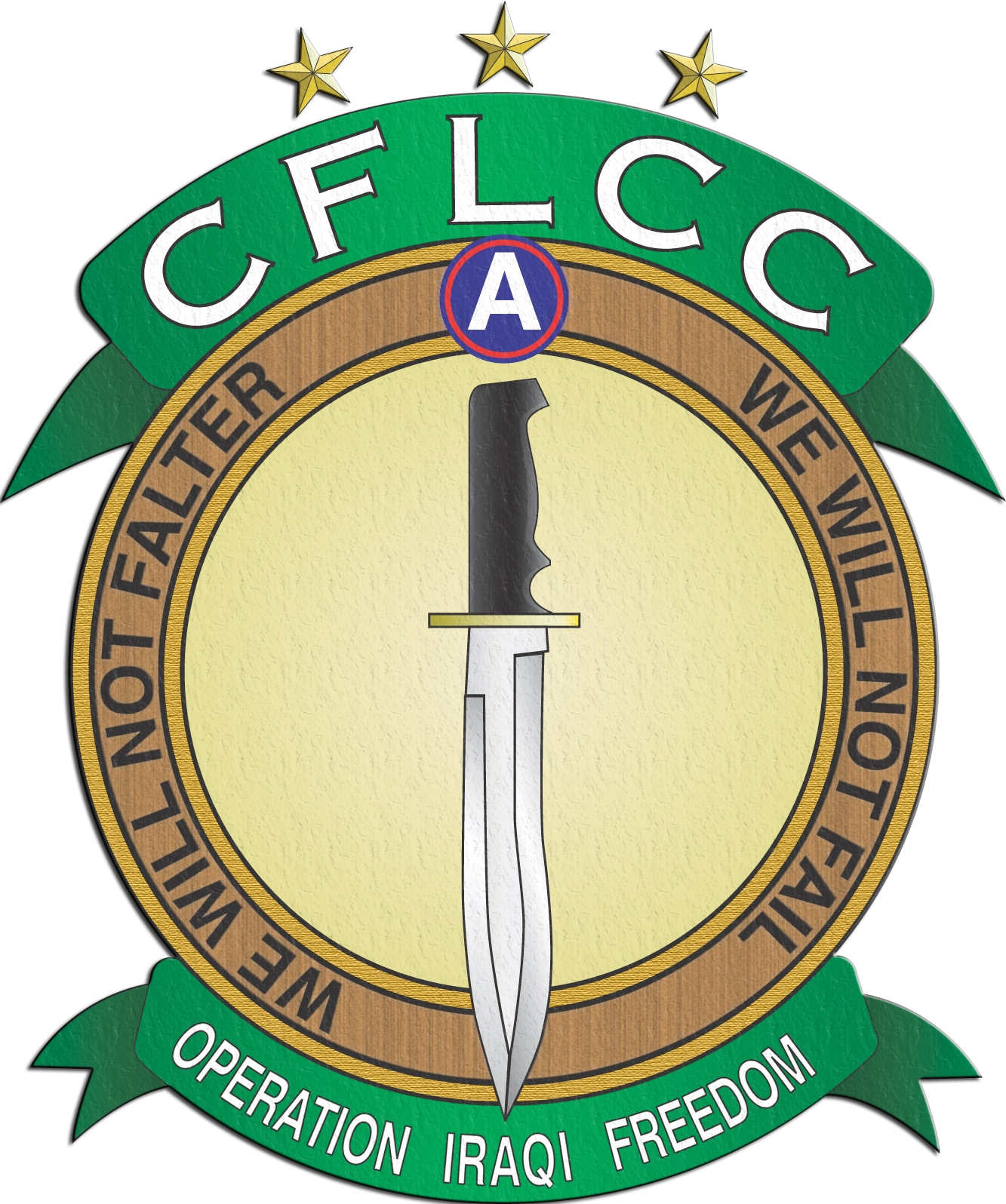
The three primary responsibilities of Third Army/ARCENT/CFLCC, represented by three separate logos.

A Coalition Forces Land Component Command was established under Commander U.S. Army Forces Central Command, Lieutenant General David McKiernan, to direct the two corps-sized formations involved in the initial invasion of Iraq in March 2003, I Marine Expeditionary Force and U.S. V Corps. The units to brigade level involved in CFLCC's initial invasion of Iraq were:

- I Marine Expeditionary Force
  - 2nd MEB
  - 1st Marine Division
    - RCT-1
    - RCT-5
    - RCT-7
  - 3rd Marine Aircraft Wing
  - 1st Marine Logistics Group
  - British 1st Armoured Division
- U.S. V Corps
  - 3rd Infantry Division
    - 1st Brigade, 3rd ID
    - 2nd Brigade, 3rd ID
    - 3rd Brigade, 3rd ID
  - 101st Airborne Division (Air Assault)
    - 1st Brigade, 101st Airborne
    - 2nd Brigade, 101st Airborne
    - 3rd Brigade, 101st Airborne
  - 173rd Airborne Brigade
  - 2nd Brigade, 82nd Airborne Division

From March until June 2003, CFLCC was joined by 1st Armored Division, 4th Infantry Division, and 2nd and 3rd Armoured Cavalry Regiments. 3rd Armored Cavalry Regiment formed Task Force Rifles to control the Al-Anbar area during its tour in Iraq which ended in September 2003.

CFLCC was replaced by Combined Joint Task Force 7 on 14 June 2003.

After its replacement by CJTF-7 as the operational headquarters for all ground units in the CENTCOM theater, CFLCC became the primary logistics hub for the theater. CFLCC still remained in charge of logistics for all land forces in theater, and remained the headquarters for U.S. Army Central Command, managing Army service component issues in the CENTCOM theatre. It is also Third US Army, the same unit that George S. Patton commanded during World War II. It is now at Camp Arifjan, Kuwait, with primary Third Army/ARCENT headquarters at Shaw Air Force Base in Sumter, South Carolina.

== See also ==
- 2003 invasion of Iraq order of battle
