= Humanitarian aid during the 2006 Lebanon War =

Humanitarian aid during the 2006 Lebanon War refers to international efforts for civilian assistance during the 2006 Lebanon War.

== Evacuation of foreign nationals ==
Despite Lebanon's history of conflict, the suddenness of the latest conflict took many governments by surprise. The Israeli strategy of blockade, including seaports, the Beirut airport, and key roads and bridges, meant that expected escape routes were unavailable. Lebanon borders only Israel and Syria. According to a spokesman for the British High Commission in the Republic of Cyprus, both France and the United States have secured permission from the British to use the facilities of the British Sovereign Base Areas, which includes RAF Akrotiri.

Most countries evacuated their nationals by sea and air via Republic of Cyprus and Turkey or by bus through Syria.

The following is a brief list of the number of foreign nationals in Lebanon during the war:

- Sri Lanka: 80,000
- Canada: 50,000 (11,000 evacuated, 11,000 home, 8 killed)
- Philippines: 30,000 (2,629 home, 65 in Syria, 2 dead)
- Australia: 25,000
- United States: 25,000 Over 15,000 were evacuated in 2006.
- UK: 22,000 (inc. 10,000 with dual nationality)
- France: 20,000
- Bangladesh: 20,000
- Egypt: 15,000 (1200 evacuated)
- India: 12,000
- Sweden: 7,000 (7,000 evacuated)
- Denmark: 4,100
- Nepal: 4,000 (Nepalese government claims that its citizens are safe from harm)
- Venezuela: around 4,000.
- Germany: 2,600
- Greece:2500-5000
- Russia: 1,500 (250 evacuated)
- Romania: 1,200 (over 400 individually entered Syria, other 651 evacuated by authorities as of July 21)
- Armenia: 1,200 (730 evacuated from both Lebanon and Israel, dozens of Lebanese Armenians have been granted asylum)
- Ukraine: 1,200 (379 evacuated, 1 killed)
- Poland: 329 (all evacuated)
- Moldova: 240 (150 evacuated)
- Mexico: 216 that wish to be evacuated
- Bulgaria: 207 that wish to be evacuated, over 100 already in Syria and on their way home.
- Iran: 200 evacuated
- Ireland: 161 already evacuated. 17 Irish Defence Forces personnel are currently serving in the Middle East.
- Cyprus: 102 evacuated.
- Croatia: 58 already evacuated.
- Slovakia: 56 already evacuated.
- Peru: Approximately 50 when crisis broke out, 4 evacuated by Chilean Airforce so far. Plans for evacuation include a route through Syria and a concerted effort involving Spain and Latin American allies.
- Kazakhstan: 31 already evacuated, 8 are still in Lebanon
- Malaysia: 10 evacuated.

Note: This is a non-exhaustive list.

=== Armenia ===
Acting spokesperson of the Armenian foreign ministry, Vladimir Karapetyan stated that "several dozens of Armenian citizens are in Lebanon at present" and that "the main goal of the Armenian Embassy in Beirut is to secure Armenian citizens. The Armenian Embassy in Lebanon takes all measures to evacuate Armenian citizens." Karapetyan remarked that "they should be transported to Aleppo, Syria, and then to Armenia." Over 600 Armenian nationals have been evacuated to Armenia from both Lebanon and Israel via the Aleppo airport since the start of the crisis, according to Yerevan officials. Dozens of Lebanese Armenians have also been evacuated. The foreign ministry estimates that there were approximately 1,200 Armenian citizens residing in Lebanon at least before the start of the crisis a week ago. On July 17, the Armenian government announced that it is ready to grant asylum to any Lebanese regardless of their ethnic origin. "Fortunately, our forecasts have proved correct and there has been no massive influx [of Armenian evacuees from Lebanon]," said Deputy Foreign Minister Gegham Gharibjanian, "even though our diplomatic missions are prepared to help to evacuate more people."

=== Australia ===
Three buses evacuated 86 Australians from Lebanon on July 17 after Australian Government officials negotiated safe passage for them with the Israeli Government. The Australian-Lebanese community in Lebanon is estimated to be as high at 25,000. By July 17, 4600 Australian citizens had registered with the Australian embassy in Beirut.

An Australian Government request for a short ceasefire in southern Lebanon to allow trapped Australians and other foreign nationals to escape was refused by Israel.

In spite of this, an Australian Government chartered ship was to evacuate about 300 Australians on July 19 to the port of Mersin, in southern Turkey, but this attempt was aborted when it was found out that the ship had been double-booked. A second vessel, this one chartered by the Canadian Government, has picked up an additional 100 Australians, and negotiations are under way for a third rescue vessel to be in Beirut by July 21. A Greek Navy ship evacuated another hundred and as of July 21 six Australian government-chartered ships are on their way to Lebanon. They will arrive on July 22.

The Australian government has been heavily criticized by Australia's ethnic Lebanese community and others for its slow and inadequate response in supporting and evacuating its citizens in Lebanon. In total 2,500 Australian citizens were evacuated from the Lebanon most of them through Cyprus.

=== Brazil ===
Brazilians are being evacuated by bus to the city of Adana, on Turkey, where the Boeing 707 popularly known as "Sucatão" (which was the previous presidential aircraft), belonging to the Força Aérea Brasileira, is being used to bring back those who do not have their own means to go back to Brazil. The buses have a large Brazilian flag on their top, to avoid being fired upon by Israeli forces.

On July 17, a group of 122 Brazilians left Beirut on 3 buses towards Adana, where the Sucatão was waiting to transport them back to Brazil, going to Recife, Guarulhos, and Rio de Janeiro. After a stopover at Algiers, it arrived on July 18 at Recife, where none of the 98 passengers (including 85 Brazilians and 5 Argentines) disembarked. It later arrived at the Base Aérea de São Paulo at Guarulhos.

On July 21, a bus with 52 Brazilians left Beirut to Adana; its passengers had their own flights and thus did not need the help of the Brazilian Air Force. Another bus with 45 Brazilians left from Damascus.

On July 23, two more buses with 85 Brazilians left Damascus to Adana.

On July 24, the Sucatão again arrived at Recife bringing more than 90 passengers from the region of the conflict.

Still on July 24, ten buses with a total of 305 Brazilians left the Beqaa Valley to Damascus.

Also on July 24, 73 Brazilians boarded a Canadian ship destined to Turkey.

On July 25, a third flight of the Brazilian Air Force with 80 passengers arrived at Recife.

More flights were currently (as of July 25) planned, some for the Sucatão and some for TAM Airlines planes. Also, another ten buses will leave the Beqaa Valley to Damascus, transporting not only Brazilians, but also Canadians, Argentines and Paraguayans.

=== Canada ===
Canada, which lost eight citizens and one UNIFIL soldier in IDF airstrikes, leased seven ships and started evacuating on July 20 some of the up to 50,000 Canadians in Lebanon to Cyprus. As of July 18, about 30,000 citizens had registered with the Canadian embassy in Beirut. The parliamentary opposition, families of victims, and others in Canada have been critical of the government's response time and the use of online registration for potential evacuees. At least 100 Canadians secured passage on ships chartered by other nations, including France and the UK. Jacques Chirac, president of France, offered Jean Charest, premier of Quebec, France's assistance in removing Canadians.

Prime Minister Stephen Harper, who was meeting with French president Jacques Chirac in Paris, travelled on his official jet to Cyprus on July 19 to allow 87 Canadians to return to Canada with him, in what he described as the "right thing to do". He was accompanied to Cyprus by only his essential staff: his bodyguards, communications aides, his logistics organizer, the tour director, a doctor, and his official photographer. Logistical difficulties developed after the government decided to evacuate Lebanon of Canadians to Turkey, and had to request that the British remove 120 Canadians to Cyprus to meet the prime minister's flight, but only about 20 boarded the British vessel. A boat chartered by the Canadian government brought Canadians, but was delayed for a number of reasons.

=== France ===
France sent a ferry from Cyprus to evacuate its own nationals with as much as a third of the passengers permitted to be nationals of other nations including Europe and the US.

=== Greece ===
Two frigates of the Hellenic Navy, a C-130 transport aircraft of the Hellenic Air Force, and several Greek ferry boats were sent to Lebanon. They evacuated between 2500 and 5000 Greek citizens, as well as large numbers of nationals of the European Union, United States, and other western countries. Evacuees traveling by ferry were first sent to Cyprus, where they boarded Olympic Airlines aircraft for transfer to Greece. Several Greek commercial ships were also used by other western countries, such as France and Sweden, in order to evacuate their nationals from the area, due to the proximity of Greece to the coast of Lebanon.

=== Iceland ===
Four Icelanders left Beirut on a bus arranged by the Norwegian embassy on July 16, 2006; another group of six who were unable to board the bus after an apparent misunderstanding was evacuated by a Finnish bus on July 17, 2006. It was further planned to fly them to Copenhagen from Damascus's international airport.

=== India ===
India redirected four of its naval vessels (INS Mumbai, INS Brahmaputra, INS Betwa, and INS Shakti) which had been returning to India after a goodwill visit to the Mediterranean region to Lebanon to evacuate Indian citizens. All of the ships were at battle stations, with guns and missiles fully warmed up. Already 49 Indians had been evacuated to Syria by bus. The ships shuttled between Beirut and Cyprus to evacuate Indians, from where they were flown out by Air India. The operation also evacuated Lebanese spouses of Indian citizens, as well as citizens of Sri Lanka and Nepal who had been living in Lebanon.

=== Ireland ===
On July 17, two buses carrying 82 people departed Beirut to crossed the Lebanese-Syrian border and arrived safely in Damascus where they flew onwards to Dubai and then Dublin. The majority of passengers were Irish citizens but there were also a small number of other EU citizens. 16 Irish people who made their own way to Damascus and were including in arrangements to fly the Irish evacuees home to Dublin. A woman who is six months pregnant and her two children were flown back to Dublin on the Government jet. A further 50 Irish people remained in Beirut. They were transported out of Lebanon on July 20.

The Irish Government refused to allow US jets carrying bombs bound for Israeli use to re-fuel in Ireland. The jets were diverted to Prestwick Airport in Scotland causing embarrassment for the British government (see below).

=== Italy ===
Italian destroyer Durand de La Penne successfully evacuated more than 350 Italians from Beirut to Larnaca, Cyprus, on Monday July 17, 2006. The civilians were then transferred to Rome, Italy, with a few civil flights operated by Alitalia.

=== Moldova ===
On President Vladimir Voronin's instructions, there was set up an operative inter-ministerial committee to deal with the evacuation of the Moldovan citizens from Lebanon, Israel and Gaza Strip. According to the Ministry of Foreign Affairs and European Integration, as of July 27 about 150 out of 240 Moldovan citizens living in Lebanon have left the country. The evacuation, started on 18th, is done with the help of Russian, Romanian and Ukrainian authorities.

=== Norway ===
Five buses evacuated approximately 150 Norwegian citizens (most of Lebanese origin) over Tripolis to Damascus. The Norway-registered ship HUAL Transporter evacuated ca. 200 Norwegians and a number of other nationalities, among them Swedes, Finns, Canadians and a large group of Americans in the afternoon of July 18. The ship headed for Cyprus with ca. 1200 evacuees aboard. A number of Norwegian citizens are also reported being in southern Lebanon. The people involved are being shipped out from Tyre to Cyprus July 20.

=== Philippines ===
Many Overseas Filipino Workers in Lebanon escaped to Syria, from where they were flown to Manila. The Philippine government assisted in the evacuation, and appealed to the Lebanese government to allow Philippine workers who were obligated by contract to continue working in Lebanon to leave.

=== Romania ===
The repatriation plans of Romanian citizens from Lebanon were established at a top level reunion convoked by Romanian President Traian Băsescu on Sunday, July 16. The participants were the Foreign Affairs Ministry, the Ministry of Defense, and the intelligence services SRI and SIE.

According to data from the Foreign Ministry in Bucharest, there were about 1200 Romanian citizens, both residents and tourists, in Lebanon at the beginning of the conflict. Romania's Foreign Affairs minister Răzvan Ungureanu asked his Syrian counterpart Walid Al-Mouallem to help Romanians transiting Syria on their way back home. All together, over 400 individually entered Syria, and other 651 were evacuated by the Romanian authorities. They are Romanians and Moldovans, Lebanese married to Romanians and foreign diplomats. There were 283 evacuated on 18th, 146 on 19th, and 222 on 20th. The convoys, bearing the Romanian flag, left the Romanian Embassy in Beirut in the mornings of the afore mentioned days to Damascus, where the refugees left from by air to Henry Coandă Airport in Bucharest, arriving there the next day, few hours after the midnight. The evacuation of others was reported to be ongoing, but their arrival at the embassy is known to be burdened by the destruction of the roads. There is no evacuation news since July 21.

=== Russia ===
A total of 1,407 Russian and Commonwealth of Independent States citizens were evacuated by Aeroflot and Russia's EMERCOM flights from Damascus, Latakia and Cyprus. Even though Russian consular officers estimated there were no more than 100-150 Russian nationals left in Lebanon by that time, mainly in the south of the country, further Emercom flights brought hundreds more people home. Additional flights evacuated Russian nationals from Gaza Strip (via Amman).

=== Sri Lanka ===
Sri Lanka has over 93,000 nationals stranded in Lebanon, 86,000 of whom are females working as domestic maids. The evacuation effort has stalled, with only a small proportion of the Sri Lankan population able to leave. The Indian Government has assisted in the evacuation of several hundred nationals.

=== Sweden ===
On July 18, 2,264 out of the approximately 7,000 Swedish citizens arrived in Sweden from Lebanon. On July 20, another 1,500 Swedes arrived in Sweden for a total of 3,700. As of July 24 it is believed most Swedes have now been evacuated, totaling around 7,000. It is believed that around 200 Swedish citizens have not been able to leave southern Lebanon, due to the heavy bombardment.

Among the evacuated Swedes are film director Josef Fares and his brother, actor Fares Fares, who were on vacation in Lebanon.

=== Turkey ===
On July 24, a military transport vessel belonging to Turkish Navy docked at Beirut to evacuate 1200 Turkish citizens. The evacuation process was overseen by a detachment of Turkish Naval Commandos (SAT) while the vessel herself was escorted by two gunboats. All refugees were successfully transported to Turkey, and the Turkish Ministry of Logistics reported that there were no further Turkish citizens in need of immediate evacuation.

=== United Kingdom ===
On the evening of July 15, news came through that the British aircraft carrier HMS Illustrious, and accompanying task force, then docked at Gibraltar, were being readied to steam to the area off the Lebanese coast, and secure it with force if necessary. This was later confirmed to be in support of the British Government's plan (announced late on July 16) to evacuate British, Commonwealth, and EU nationals from Lebanon. By July 17, the MOD confirmed that two Royal Navy ships were already off the coast of Lebanon and four more were on the way.

Illustrious and HMS Bulwark were steaming towards the area from the western Mediterranean and arrived by noon on July 20 to assist with evacuations. HMS Gloucester and HMS York were already in the area, and Gloucester had already evacuated 180 British nationals from Beirut. Also, the Royal Fleet Auxiliary stores ship RFA Fort Victoria and the Type 23 frigate HMS St Albans headed for the area to assist in the evacuation. The evacuation by sea was expected to take around a week to complete. A group of RAF Chinook helicopters were sent from RAF Odiham in Hampshire in England to RAF Akrotiri on Cyprus. Amongst those evacuated from Beirut by the RAF was Javier Solana, the EU foreign policy commissioner.

=== United States ===
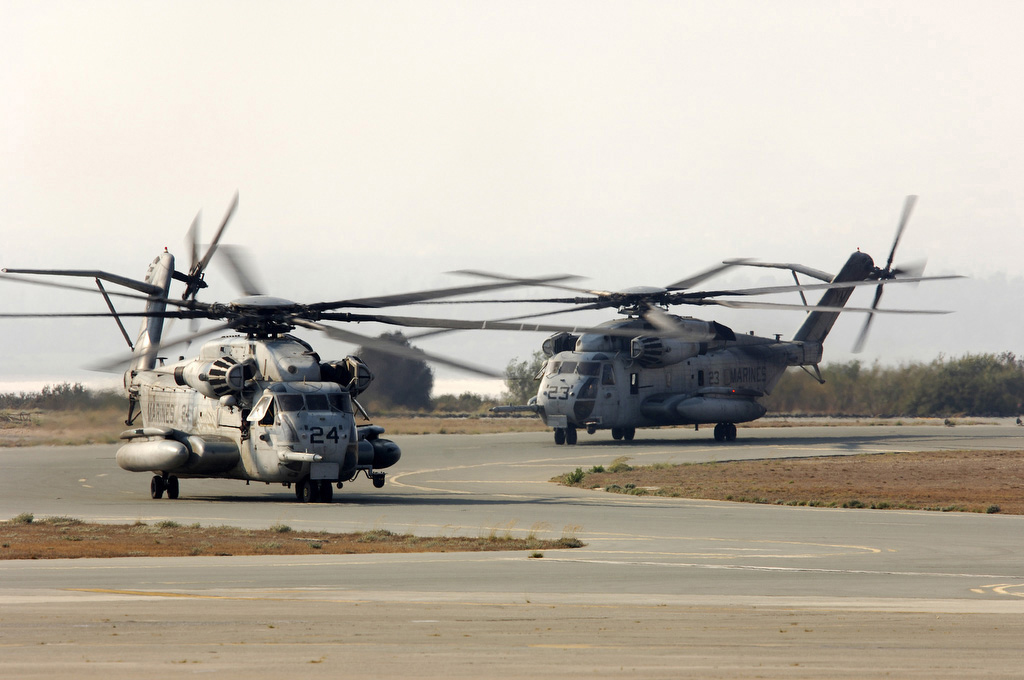
Two U.S. Marine Corps helicopters operating from Cyprus assisting in the evacuation of US citizens.

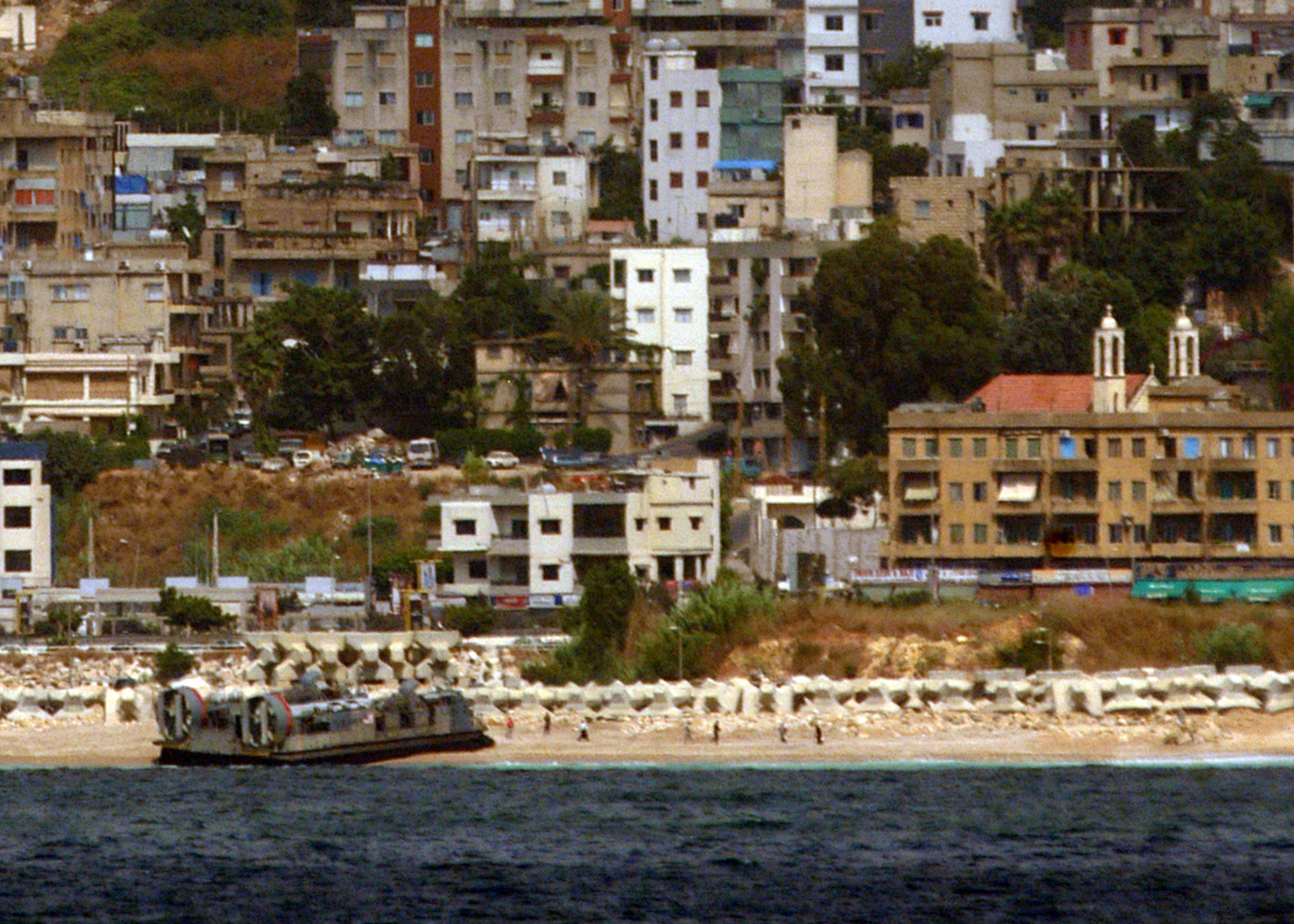
U.S. Navy Landing Craft Air Cushion (LCAC) on the shore of Lebanon picking up US citizens.

The U.S. estimated that as many as 25,000 Americans citizens were in Lebanon, but the number finally evacuated was approximately 15,000. After hostilities began on July 12, 2006, media reports hinted that U.S. Navy ships from the Iwo Jima Expeditionary Strike Group could be moved from exercises in the Red Sea to an offshore position in Lebanon. Shortly after, the U.S. announced and began executing a plan to evacuate its nationals using military assets, as well as a chartered cruise ship, the Orient Queen, under guard by the destroyers Gonzalez (DDG 66) and Barry (DDG 52). According to Joint Task Force Lebanon/Task Force 59 spokesperson Navy Commander Darryn C. James, since hostilities between Israel and Hezbollah militants began on July 12, 2006, the "sea bridge" and "air bridge" provided by U.S. Central Command and U.S. European Command assets helped nearly 15,000 American citizens safely depart Lebanon—one of the largest evacuations in U.S. military history. Dubbed Operation "Strengthen Hope," Department of Defense (DoD) assets such as HSV-2 Swift were also instrumental in assisting in the distribution of millions of dollars (of a U.S. pledged 230 million) in humanitarian aid to the Lebanese people. Task Force 59 personnel, led by Marine Corps Brigadier General Carl B. Jensen, were the first to arrive in the "joint operation area" (JOA) region on July 16 where DoD assets evacuated 21 American citizens out of Beirut by helicopter on the first day. On July 21, DoD assets moved more than 3,000 people and brought the total of American citizens evacuated that week to more than 6,000. Sailors and Marines from the Iwo Jima (LHD 7) Expeditionary Strike Group (ESG) including Nashville (LPD 13), Whidbey Island (LSD 41), Trenton (LPD 14) and the 24th Marine Expeditionary Unit (24th MEU) arrived on station July 20 and began using utility landing craft (LCU) to safely transport American citizens wishing to depart Lebanon to avoid the hostilities. By July 24, more than 12,000 American citizens had been pulled out of Lebanon. Most of the American citizens were transported to the island nation of Cyprus. The transfer in military responsibility to the organization that would become JTF Lebanon led by Navy Vice Admiral John "Boomer" Stufflebeem, continued the DoD mission to protect American citizens, support the American Embassy in Beirut, assist the people of Lebanon through humanitarian aid, and help the multinational effort to provide lasting regional stability.

=== Ukraine ===
Ukraine has over 1,200 nationals stranded in Lebanon, 379 evacuated, 1 killed.

== Humanitarian and economic aid ==
=== European Union ===
It was announced on July 30 that the European Commission had allocated 11 million euros ($14 million) under the EU's Rapid Reaction Mechanism to fund an appeal by the International Organization for Migration in an effort to assist around 10,000 citizens from developing countries in fleeing Lebanon.

=== Armenia ===
On July 26, Armenia announced that it would send humanitarian aid to Lebanon. According to the Armenian government, an unspecified amount of medicines, tents and fire-fighting equipment was allocated to Lebanese authorities on July 27. They were shipped to Beirut via Syria later in the day.

=== Egypt ===
President Hosni Mubarak ordered the delivery of humanitarian aid to Lebanon in order to help the Lebanese people against Israeli attacks. Consequently, on 31 July, two Egyptian military aircraft landed in Beirut, as the first dispatch of the help promised by the Egyptian government. The first aircraft carried medical and food supplies, while the second carried in addition to the humanitarian aid, the basic equipment as well as the first personnel needed to build a field military hospital, which the Egyptian government had ordered for its construction as a gift to the Lebanese people. This hospital will be equipped by around 100 doctors and other medical professionals.

=== Finland ===
It was announced on July 30 that the Finnish Government had pledged a grant of 1.5 million euros ($1.9 million) in emergency relief for Lebanon.

=== France ===
it was announced on July 30 that the French Government had pledged 17.5 million euros ($22.4 million) in aid and is preparing 1 million euros ($1.3 million) of food aid. A boat is also being sent to Lebanon funded by private donations and state aid.

=== Greece ===
Announced on 30 July that Greek Government is sending 20,000 doses of antibiotics, as well as various medical aid to Lebanon. On 31 July, the first dispatch of humanitarian aid from Greece to Lebanon landed at Cyprus' Larnaca airport, according to Deputy Foreign Minister Evripidis Stylianidis. The aid will be transferred to a Greek tank-landing vessel docked at the Larnaca port to be shipped to Beirut. Greece's aid pacakge includes nine tons of medical supplies, bedding and tents requested by the Lebanese government from the European Union. "Hellenic Aid mobilised all the NGOs involved in humanitarian aid and the appropriate ministries," Stylianidis noted.

=== Hungary ===
Hungary pledged to deliver humanitarian aid worth 6 million forints (about 28,047 U.S. dollars) to Lebanon on 25 July. According to Hungarian foreign ministry spokesman Viktor Polgar, "the aid consists of basic food stuffs, baby food and supplements, medicine and primary care materials needed by doctors."

=== Ireland ===
It was announced on July 30 that the Republic of Ireland Government pledged to provide 1 million euros ($1.3 million) in relief assistance for Lebanon and the Palestinian territories.

=== Jordan ===
Despite their denouncement of Hezbollah, Jordan supports Lebanon with aid. King Abdullah also ordered relief planes to arrive at the Beirut International Airport, some with several tons of food items and medical supplies to provide help to the Lebanese, and others with an equipped field hospital. Teams from the royal engineering force accompanied the plane to reopen Beirut Airport. The planes are a total of seven since 29 July. Faisal al-Fayez said the impression of the Lebanese people for the opening of the field hospital is great, pointing out that Lebanese Minister of Education and Higher Education Khaled Qabbani opened the field hospital yesterday as it startsed work to relieve the suffering of the brethren Lebanese and to treat the victims of Israeli aggression.

However, there are also reports that some aid from Jordan along with offers of medical assistance has been shunned by some Lebanese citizens in protest at the Jordanian Government's reaction towards the attacks on Lebanon. Other reports also that the medicine sent by Jordan is being stolen and then sold, Lebanese officials claim its people from the Amal movement.

The peace treaty between Jordan and Israel has probably played an important role in the Jordanian initiative of sending relief planes, in fact, countries like the United Arab Emirates are taking advantage of that by using the Amman Airport as the medium of sending their own relief planes to Lebanon. That's because Jordan has opened a safe air passage between Lebanon and Jordan to be used for aid.

A TV station held a telethon to collect aid for the Lebanese and the Palestinians.

=== Kuwait ===
Kuwait donated $300 million for reconstruction in addition to an earlier donation of $20 million. Kuwait has also provided $500 million to be deposited in Lebanon's central bank.

=== Morocco ===
Morocco sent MAD 6 million ($700,000) worth of humanitarian aid to Lebanon. Morocco also granted $5,000,000 for relief.

=== Saudi Arabia ===
Saudi King Abdullah has promised to grant $1.5 billion to Lebanon to pay for reconstruction.

=== Syria ===
At the peak of the crisis, some 180,000 people sought temporary accommodation in and around the Syrian capital of Damascus. The Aga Khan Development Network (AKDN) and its emergency response affiliate, Focus Humanitarian Assistance (FOCUS) provided immediate humanitarian relief in response to the conflict, establishing a Mother and Child Health Centre at Damascus University campus which provided specialist medical care, a pharmacy and a day care centre for young children. This facility accommodated 1,300 displaced persons; the majority of whom were mothers and young children. In conjunction with the United Nations High Commissioner for Refugees (UNHCR), AKDN and FOCUS established and managed relief distribution warehouses in the key locations of Tartous, Homs and Salamiyah. The agencies also oversaw registration and profiling of displaced persons, and the distribution of non-food items. Furthermore, over 100 local community volunteers were mobilised to provide essential logistical support to the United Nations World Food Programme (WFP). Volunteers distributed relief items including hygiene kits, plastic sheeting, blankets, mattresses, cooking utensils, safe drinking water and high-energy biscuits to assist families during the conflict and also on their return journey to Lebanon.

=== Turkey ===
In tandem with shipments of aid the Palestinians sent on July 19 and July 27, the Red Crescent announced on July 31 that two Arctic trucks carrying medical aid, foodstuffs and kitchen utensils were being sent from Turkey to Lebanon.

=== United Arab Emirates ===
On July 25, the United Arab Emirates pledged 20 million dollars towards the UN Programme for the Relief of Lebanon. United Arab Emirates has conducted a telethon, aired live on various Dubai and Emirates TV channels. UAE continued to send aid via the Queen Alia International Airport in Jordan.

=== United Kingdom ===
It was announced on July 30 that the British Government had pledged an extra 2.2 million pounds ($4.1 million), taking total British commitment to 5 million pounds ($9.4 million).

=== United States ===
In addition to $230 million that Washington pledged at an August conference in Stockholm, pledges of grants and loans are $770 million from the United States.

The Church of Jesus Christ of Latter-day Saints (based in Utah) has prepared a plane shipment of aid to be sent to Lebanon, and has also met a request from Magen David Adom for $50,000 to be used for their "blood services program, ambulance response, and support of individual family needs".

== See also ==
- International reactions to the 2006 Lebanon War
- Humanitarian aid during the Syrian civil war
