= Joint Task Force Lebanon =

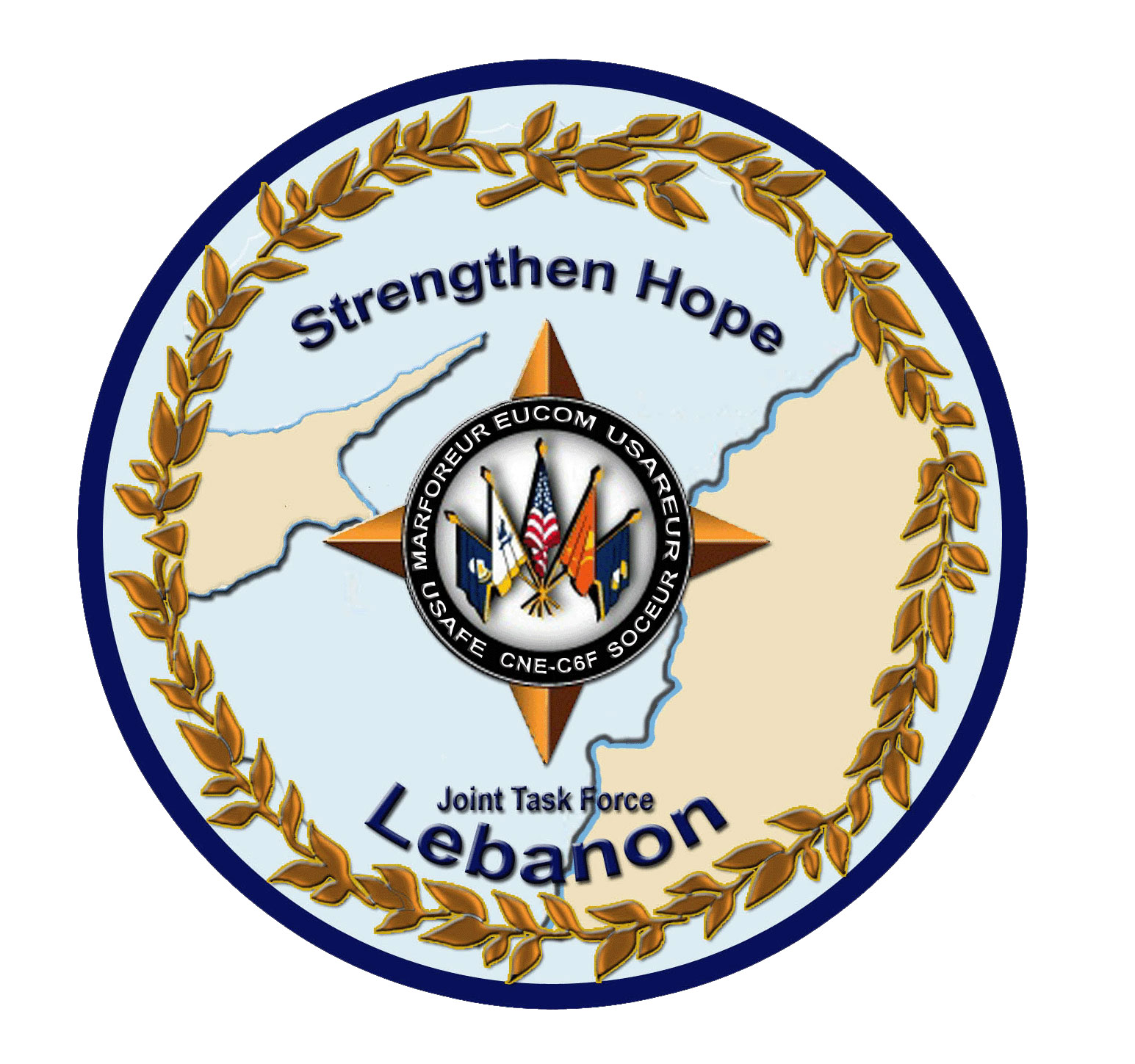
Emblem of Joint Task Force Lebanon (JTF-L)

Joint Task Force Lebanon (JTF-L) is a U.S. European Command (EUCOM) operational unit established in 2006 and assigned responsibility for U.S. military support to the American Embassy in Beirut and to help U.S. Department of State led humanitarian assistance efforts that are providing aid to the people of Lebanon. Led by Commander, U.S. Sixth Fleet Navy Vice Admiral John "Boomer" Stufflebeem, JTF Lebanon officially accepted the mission on August 23, 2006 from U.S. Central Command (CENTCOM) units, which had been operating in the region since mid-July 2006 shortly after hostilities began between Israel and Hezbollah militants based in Lebanon.

Its area of responsibility focuses on a "joint operation area" (JOA) around the country of Lebanon to include a wide portion of the eastern Mediterranean Sea. JTF-L includes numerous ships and air assets, and more than 2,400 Air Force, Army, Marine Corps and Navy active and reserve personnel. Most command element personnel are headquartered aboard the command flagship Mount Whitney (LCC/JCC 20) that is homeported in Gaeta, Italy.

== Mission ==
Assist the U.S. government commitment to enhance regional stability by supporting U.S. joint interagency efforts involved in operations to aid Lebanon and protect American citizens. Specifically, JTF-L was tasked to directly support the American Embassy in Beirut and to help U.S. Department of State led humanitarian assistance efforts that are providing aid to the people of Lebanon

== Organization ==
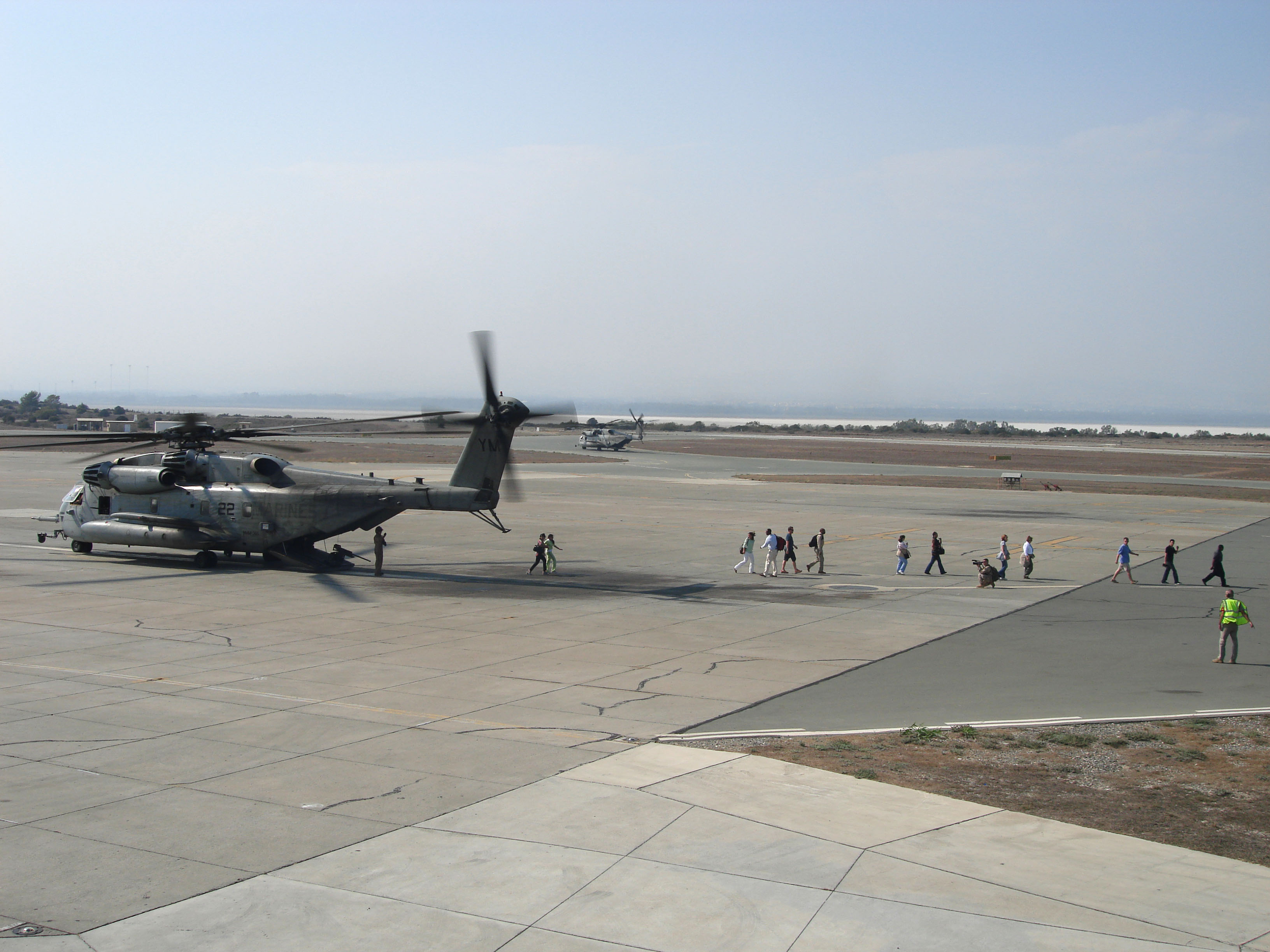
U.S. Marines Helicopter at RAF Akrotiri in Cyprus.

Commander, Joint Task Force Lebanon, Vice Admiral Stufflebeem assigned two task force commanders with responsibility for the air, land and sea support to the American Embassy in Beirut and to execute the daily operations necessary to carry out the mission to assist Department of State-led efforts in the region.

=== JTF-L Task Force ALPHA, Air and Land Forces ===
Air Force Colonel Brad Webb leads Task Force “Alpha” consisting of air and land components and assigned more than 450 personnel from all branches of the U.S. military. As Commander, 352nd Special Operations Group, Colonel Webb arrived in the region on July 19, 2006 with more than 180 personnel from his home station at RAF Mildenhall, UK. Using Cyprus as a land-based headquarters, a group of MH-53M Pave Low heavy-lift helicopters completed an “air bridge” for taking people in and out of the American Embassy in Beirut, where a JTF-L Marine Corps Fleet Anti-Terrorism Security Team (FAST) is located. Task Force Alpha is also responsible for MC-130P Combat Shadow refuelers, a small logistics element, and "Big Windy" Army CH-47 helicopters based out of Ansbach, GE.

=== JTF-L Task Force BRAVO, Maritime Forces ===
Commander, Destroyer Squadron 60, Navy Captain John Nowell leads Task Force “Bravo” consisting of maritime assets in the JOA designated around Lebanon. Although many ships have conducted "sea bridge" and "escort" operations supporting JTF-L during the course of operations, Task Force Bravo has a typical naval presence of approximately 1,800 sailors, Marines and civilian mariners aboard platforms such as Gonzalez (DDG 66), Barry (DDG 52), Hue City (CG 66), Trenton (LPD 14), Wasp (LHD 1), HSV-2 Swift, Kanawha (T-AO 196) and the JTF Lebanon flagship Mount Whitney (LCC/JCC 20).

== History of operations ==
According to Joint Task Force Lebanon/Task Force 59 spokesperson Navy Commander Darryn James, since hostilities between Israel and Hezbollah militants began on July 12, 2006 the “sea bridge” and "air bridge" provided by U.S. Central Command and U.S. European Command assets helped nearly 15,000 American citizens safely depart Lebanon—one of the largest evacuations in U.S. military history. Dubbed Operation “Strengthen Hope”, Department of Defense (DoD) assets such as HSV-2 Swift were also instrumental in assisting in the distribution of millions of dollars (of a U.S. pledged $230 million) in humanitarian aid to the Lebanese people. Task Force 59 personnel, led by Marine Corps Brigadier General Carl Jensen, were the first to arrive in the “joint operation area” (JOA) region on July 16 where DoD assets evacuated 21 American citizens out of Beirut by helicopter on the first day. On July 21, DoD assets moved more than 3,000 people and brought the total of American citizens evacuated that week to more than 6,000. Sailors and Marines from the Iwo Jima (LHD 7) Expeditionary Strike Group (ESG) including Nashville (LPD 13), Whidbey Island (LSD 41), Trenton (LPD 14) and the 24th Marine Expeditionary Unit (24th MEU) arrived on station July 20 and began using utility landing craft (LCU) to safely transport American citizens wishing to depart Lebanon to avoid the hostilities. By July 24, more than 12,000 American citizens had been pulled out of Lebanon. Most of the American citizens were transported to the island nation of Cyprus. The transfer in military responsibility to the organization that would become JTF Lebanon led by Navy Vice Admiral John "Boomer" Stufflebeem, continued the DoD mission to protect American citizens, support the American Embassy in Beirut, assist the people of Lebanon through humanitarian aid, and help the multinational effort to provide lasting regional stability.

== Emblem origin ==
The blue outer circle surrounding the emblem shows the continuity of the U.S. joint interagency effort between all elements involved in operations to aid Lebanon and protect American citizens. The gold olive branch wreath represents peaceful humanitarian assistance. Lebanon and Cyprus highlight the U.S. enduring partnerships with both governments and specific joint task force support to the American embassies in Beirut and Nicosia. The compass is derived from the U.S. European Command (EUCOM) emblem and indicates the JTF-L willingness to accomplish all assigned missions throughout the region whenever called upon. Within EUCOM, the circle emphasizes component commands providing Soldiers, Sailors, Airmen and Marines who are working together in the joint arena. The motto "Strengthen Hope" originates from remarks made by the President of the United States and communicates a strategic objective to support the people of Lebanon and provide lasting regional stability.
