= Gegham =

Gegham is an Armenian masculine given name. Notable people with the name include:

- Gegham Aleksanyan (born 1962), Armenian-born artist working in the US
- Gegham Ghandilyan (1974–2009), Armenian television actor
- Gegham Gharibjanian (born 1951), Armenian politician and diplomat
- Gegham Grigoryan (1951–2016), Armenian operatic tenor
- Gegham Harutyunyan (born 1990), Armenian professional footballer
- Gegham Kadimyan (born 1992), professional Armenian footballer
- Gegham Nazaryan (born 1971), Armenian politician and journalist
- Gegham Saryan (1902–1976), Armenian poet and translator
- Gegham Ter-Karapetian (1865–1918), writer and poet known as Msho Gegham
- Gegham Vardanyan (born 1988), Armenian figure skater

== See also ==
- Gegham mountains, a range of mountains in Armenia
