= USS Trenton (LPD-14) =

United States Navy ship

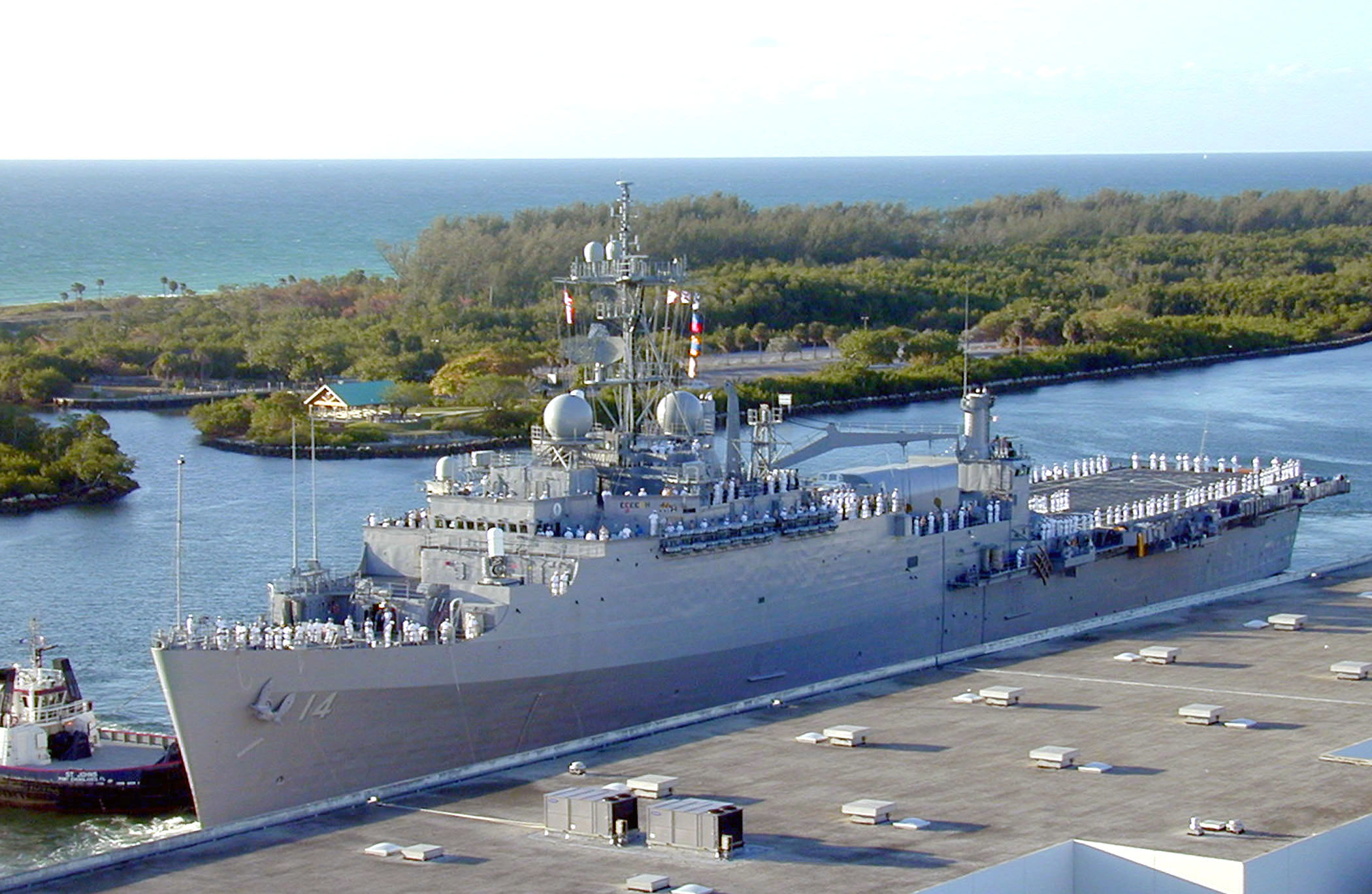
- Trenton's crew "man the rail" as a commercial tug pushes them to the pier at Port Everglades, Florida, for Fleet Week 2004.

History

United States
- Name: Trenton
- Namesake: Trenton, New Jersey
- Ordered: 17 May 1965
- Laid down: 8 August 1966
- Launched: 3 August 1968
- Commissioned: 6 March 1971
- Decommissioned: 17 January 2007
- Stricken: 17 January 2007
- Home port: Norfolk, Virginia
- Identification: Hull number: LPD-14
- Motto: "Press On"
- Fate: Sold to Indian Navy on 17 January 2007

India
- Name: INS Jalashwa
- Acquired: 17 January 2007
- Status: Active

General characteristics
- Class & type: Austin-class amphibious transport dock
- Tonnage: 7,696 DWT
- Displacement: 8,894 long tons (9,037 t); 16,590 long tons (16,860 t) full
- Length: 569 ft 11 in (173.7 m) overall; 547 ft 11 in (167 m) waterline
- Beam: 99 ft 9 in (30.4 m) extreme; 25.6 m (84 ft 0 in) waterline
- Draft: 22 ft 0 in (6.7 m) maximum; 23 ft 0 in (7 m) limit
- Speed: 21 knots (39 km/h; 24 mph)
- Complement: 28 officers, 480 enlisted, 1,436 Marines
- Armament: 4 × 3 in/50 caliber AA gun mounts
- Aircraft carried: Up to six CH-46 Sea Knight helicopters

USS Trenton (LPD-14) was an Austin-class amphibious transport dock, the third ship of the United States Navy to be named for the capital of New Jersey. In 2007, she was sold to the Indian Navy and renamed INS Jalashwa.

== History ==
=== Building process ===
Her keel was laid down at Seattle, Washington, on 8 August 1966 by the Lockheed Shipbuilding and Construction Company. She was launched on 3 August 1968 sponsored by Mrs. Richard J. Hughes, and commissioned on 6 March 1971.

=== Initial operations ===
Trenton got under way on 9 April 1971 for the East Coast and reached her home port, Norfolk, Virginia, on 12 May. The amphibious transport dock remained in port until 1 June when she departed Hampton Roads for shakedown training out of Guantanamo Bay Naval Base in Cuba. However, on 28 June, her shakedown cruise was interrupted when a steam valve in her number two engine room ruptured, killing four sailors instantly and severely injuring six others. The injured men were evacuated first to Guantánamo Bay and thence to the burn ward of the United States Army Hospital at Fort Sam Houston, Texas. There, two of the six subsequently died as a result of their injuries.

Trenton returned to Guantánamo Bay for interim repairs and then made her way back to Norfolk on one engine, arriving on 6 July. After repairs at the Norfolk Naval Shipyard, she completed shakedown training off the Virginia Capes and in the Guantánamo Bay operating area. On 9 November, the ship returned to Norfolk and remained there through the end of 1971.

=== 1972–1973 ===
On 17 January 1972, Trenton rounded Cape Charles and headed north to participate in the military exercise Exercise "Snowy Beach." She arrived off Reid State Park, Maine, three days later and participated in the cold weather amphibious exercise until 23 January when she headed home. On 4 February, she stood out of Hampton Roads bound for the Gulf of Mexico in company with Ponce. The two ships reached New Orleans, Louisiana, on 9 February and, for the next six days, served as "hotel" ships for ROTC and military participants in Mardi Gras.

Trenton returned to Norfolk on 20 February and resumed her East Coast-West Indies routine. Following amphibious training at Onslow Beach, North Carolina, and sea trials near Norfolk, she visited the Caribbean Sea in April with other units of Amphibious Squadron (PhibRon) 4. She then devoted the rest of the early summer to exercises and training at Onslow Beach and at Norfolk before preparing for her first Mediterranean deployment.

The ship departed Norfolk on 28 July, embarked Marines at Morehead City, North Carolina, on 29 July, and headed across the Atlantic on 30 July. She reached Rota, Spain, on 10 August and, with the other units of PhibRon 4, was incorporated into the United States Sixth Fleet as Task Force (TF) 61. She spent the remainder of the year and most of the first month of 1973 in the Mediterranean Sea. During that six-month period, Trenton participated in six amphibious landing exercises (Phiblexes), most of which were conducted in cooperation with the military services of foreign nations. In September, she conducted a landing exercise at Timbakion, Crete, with units of the Italian Navy. Greek and Italian ships joined her later that month for Phiblex 3–73 conducted at Alexandroupolis, Greece. In mid-October, troops of the French Foreign Legion provided the opposition for a landing exercise at Corsica. Trenton visited İzmir, Turkey, in mid-September and, in mid-December, concluded her exercise schedule at Porto Scuda, Sardinia, with Phiblex 6–73. On 16 January 1973, she headed home; and, ten days later, she entered the Naval Amphibious Base at Little Creek, Virginia.

On 1 March, Trenton shifted to the administrative command of PhibRon 10. On the 27th, she embarked Marines at Morehead City and headed for Onslow Beach, where she participated in Exercise "Exotic Dancer VI." On 7 April, the warship headed south to Vieques Island, near Puerto Rico. From 10 to 14 April, Trenton joined other Navy ships in Exercise "Escort Tiger XIV," which consisted of training for disaster assistance to the island countries of the Caribbean. During this Caribbean cruise, she visited Maracaibo, Venezuela, San Juan, Puerto Rico, and St. Thomas in the U.S. Virgin Islands before embarking the Marines at Vieques on 3 May. After a port visit at Ponce, Puerto Rico, Trenton carried her Marines to Guantánamo Bay for a four-day exercise. On 14 May, she departed the Caribbean and, after disembarking the Marines on 17 May, reached Norfolk on 18 May.

On 11 June, Trenton steamed out of Hampton Roads for northern Europe. She reached Kiel, Germany, on 22 June, and, for the next week, participated in the annual "Kiel Week" naval celebration. Early in July, she visited Portsmouth, England, and, at mid-month, put into Rotterdam, the Netherlands. The amphibious transport dock departed Europe at Rotterdam on 21 July and headed back to the United States.

Trenton spent the remainder of the summer conducting drills in the Virginia Capes Operating Area and in preparation for her second Caribbean deployment of the year. On 1 October, she shifted from PhibRon 10 to PhibRon 8. On the last day of that month, she embarked Marines at Morehead City and headed south. For the remainder of the year, she cruised the Caribbean, visiting ports in Puerto Rico, the Virgin Islands, and in the Netherlands Antilles as well as conducting amphibious exercises at Vieques Island. The amphibious transport dock returned to Norfolk on 14 December.

=== 1974–1975 ===
During the first four months of 1974, Trenton conducted operations out of Little Creek and Norfolk and prepared for duty in the Mediterranean. On 10 May, she embarked Marines at Morehead City and put to sea. Ten days later, she reached Rota, Spain, and joined the Sixth Fleet. For the next six months' she cruised the Mediterranean, visiting ports and conducting exercises. In July, Trenton participated in the evacuation of 286 refugees from strife-torn Cyprus to Beirut, Lebanon. While with the Sixth Fleet, she participated in four amphibious exercises. One Operation – "Good Friendship/Double Effect" – included ships of the Turkish Navy. On 20 October, she steamed out of Rota to return to the United States. She arrived in Norfolk on 31 October and operated in the western Atlantic through the end of 1974.

On 7 March 1975, she embarked Marines at Morehead City and headed south. After an amphibious assault exercise at Onslow Beach from 8 to 10 March, she continued south to the Caribbean. During the two-month cruise, Trenton participated in four exercises, two of which – "LantReadEx 2–76" and "Rum Punch" – were held in cooperation with units of the Royal Navy and the Royal Netherlands Navy. She returned to Norfolk on 28 April. In May, she hosted a class from the Naval War College, conducted a midshipman training cruise for the United States Naval Academy, and returned to Onslow Beach for joint service Exercise "Solid Shield." During the early summer, Trenton prepared for overhaul. On 14 August, she headed north to New York, moored at the Coastal Drydock and Repair Company on the following day, and commenced a nine-month overhaul.

=== 1976–1980 ===
On 12 May 1976, Trenton completed her overhaul and, following loadout at Little Creek, Virginia, she deployed to Guantánamo Bay, Cuba on 6 July for refresher training. Returning to Norfolk on 17 August, the ship's next three months was spent in preparation for a forthcoming Mediterranean deployment. On 15 November, Trenton, with embarked elements of Marine Battalion Landing Team 1/6, formed Mediterranean Amphibious Ready Group 3–76 and operated with the Sixth Fleet. On 17 January 1977, in Barcelona, Spain, a landing craft being used as a liberty boat by Trenton and USS Guam, was run over by a freighter. The boat capsized and came to rest against the fleet landing pier. Crewmembers from both vessels were on hand to assist with rescue operations. There were over one hundred sailors and marines on board the landing craft. 49 sailors and marines were killed. A memorial is erected at the landing pier in memory. She returned to Norfolk on 12 May 1977.

Following post-deployment stand down which ended on 30 June, Trenton spent the remainder of 1977 conducting midshipman training cruises, engaging in amphibious exercises, and participating in Comptuex 3–77, which involved units of the Standing Naval Force Atlantic.

The year 1978 found Trenton embarking elements of Battalion Landing Team 1/2 and deploying to the Caribbean from 30 January to 7 March to participate in Atlantic Fleet Readiness Exercise 1–78. The succeeding four months were spent in preparations for a return to the Mediterranean. The ship, with embarked elements of Marine Battalion Landing Team 2/8, departed Morehead City on 27 July, as part of Mediterranean Amphibious Ready Group 2–78. The remainder of 1978 was spent with the Sixth Fleet in that sea.

In September 1980, Trenton served as the Advance Force flagship for the three-week NATO Exercise Teamwork – 80, in the fjords of Norway. Trenton embarked the flag staff of Commander Service Force Atlantic, including two female officers – the first time that female officers were embarked on Navy ships for long-term major exercises. As the Advance Force flagship, Trenton inserted SEALs and Marine Recon units as the first phase of the exercise, before landing other Marine units. After the exercise, the ship made port visits to Malmö, Sweden; Bremen, Germany; and Portsmouth, England before returning to Norfolk.

=== 1981–1996 ===
In January 1981, Trenton departed Norfolk for a six-month deployment with the Sixth Fleet in the Mediterranean as part of the Marine Amphibious Ready Group (MARG 1-81) and Battalion Landing Team 2/8. The ship with her embarked Marines conducted amphibious landings and exercises with Spain, Italy and Greece. During operations in Spain, the Marines lost a Cobra helicopter with the pilot and the Marine Medical Officer killed. Plans to transit the Suez Canal and operate in the Red Sea and Indian Ocean were cancelled in order to remain south of Crete for possible Non-combatant Evacuation Operations (NEO) in Lebanon. The ship remained at sea more than 70 days. Port visits were made around the Mediterranean. On 27 April 1981, during the five-day port visit to Alexandria, Trenton and the submarine USS Jack were slightly damaged when the Jack, surged against Trenton in heavy sea swells. In June, the Chief of Naval Operations, Admiral Hayward, visited the ship. Trenton returned to Norfolk in July 1981.

On 17 October 1983 the Trenton departed Norfolk for the Mediterranean Sea. Somewhere east of Bermuda, she was diverted to Grenada to take part in Operation Urgent Fury. Trenton transited to the Eastern Mediterranean in November and took station off the coast of Beirut. While there she lost the hydraulic operating system for the port sterngate, as a result of operating in high sea conditions, and had to retire to Larnaca Bay, Cyprus to raise it lest it be lost to heavy seas. Further repairs were made at Haifa, Israel during December and until 3 January 1984.

In April 1988, Trenton participated in Operation Praying Mantis, a one-day naval battle between the United States and Iran, one helicopter was lost. The ship and its crew were awarded the Combat Action Ribbon, the Joint Meritorious Unit Award, Navy Meritorious Unit Commendation, and the Armed Forces Expeditionary Medal for various operations.

In August 1990, Trenton was ordered to the Persian Gulf in support of Operation Desert Shield and Operation Desert Storm. Her crew received a Navy Unit Commendation, the Southwest Asia Service Medal with two bronze stars for both Operation Desert Shield and Operation Desert Storm, the Kuwait Liberation Medal by the Kuwaiti government and the Kuwait Liberation Medal by the Saudi Arabian government.

On 26 December 1990, Navy Seals, Marine Recon, and Marine MPs from Trenton boarded the Libyan ship Kahldoon to search for prohibited cargo. 10,000 pounds (4,500 kg) of rice was found and confiscated. It was determined that the Libyan vessel was in violation of the supply embargo placed on Iraq.

On 2 January 1991, Trenton along with USS Guam were dispatched from anchorage off Oman to be prepared for Non-combatant Evacuation Operations (NEO) from Mogadishu, Somalia's capital, which had been suddenly enveloped by violence when rebels entered the city and the central government collapsed. On 5–6 January, 281 US and foreign nationals were airlifted from the US embassy, including all of the embassy's staff along with diplomats from several nations (notably, the Soviet ambassador to Somalia and 38 Soviet diplomats). The vessels returned to Oman and the evacuees disembarked on 11 January, ending Operation Eastern Exit. The ship and crew were awarded the Navy Unit Commendation as part of PHIBRON 6.

In April 1996, President Clinton ordered the ship to steam towards the coast of Liberia to assist in the evacuation of U.S. citizens and foreign nationals. This operation became known as Operation Assured Response. Her crew received the Joint Meritorious Unit Award.

=== End of United States Navy career ===
In July 2006, the U.S. tasked the vessel with evacuating citizens from Lebanon. The ship took some 3,500 Americans in two trips one to Cyprus and the other to Turkey. During the deployment, the ship's crew also conducted maritime security operations off the Somali Peninsula in Africa. Trenton and its nearly 400 sailors made their final homecoming 21 September 2006 before the ship's decommissioning and transfer to the Indian Navy on 17 January 2007.

On 16 February 2007, Trenton was awarded the 2006 Battle "E" award.

== Sale to the Indian Navy ==
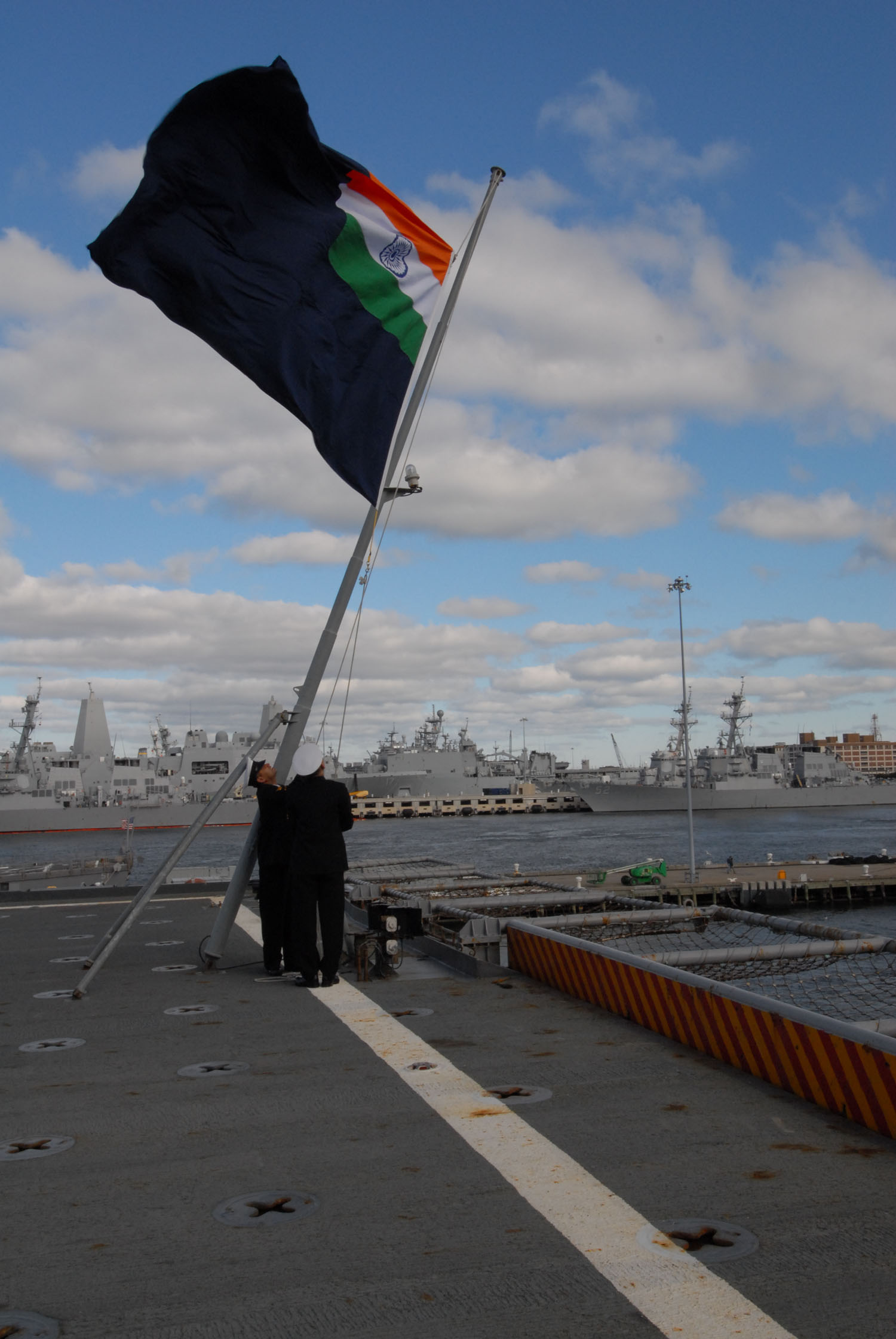
Trenton becomes Jalashwa as the Indian Navy jack is raised on the ship

In 2006, the Indian government purchased Trenton for US$48.44 million (Rs 2.18 billion). The ship was turned over to the Indian Navy on 17 January 2007. The Indian Navy renamed the ship as the INS Jalashwa (Sanskrit for Hippopotamus). It remained at Norfolk Naval Base for refitting until May 2007. Six UH-3 Sea King maritime utility transport helicopters are operated from the ship. The ship is based at Visakhapatnam under the Eastern Naval Command.
