= Gegham Gharibjanian =

Armenian politician and diplomat

Gegham Gharibjanian Գեղամ Ղարիբջանյան

Ambassador Extraordinary and Plenipotentiary of Armenia to the State of Qatar
- In office 16 May 2013 – 28 July 2021
- President: Armen Sarkissian
- Minister: Ararat Mirzoyan

Ambassador Extraordinary and Plenipotentiary of Armenia to the United Arab Emirates
- In office 12 March 2012 – 25 September 2018
- Preceded by: Vahagn Melikian
- Succeeded by: Mher Mkrtumyan

Secretary General (Head of Staff) of the National Assembly
- In office 19 January 2009 – 11 February 2012
- Preceded by: Hayk Qotanyan

Deputy Minister of the Ministry of Foreign Affairs of Armenia
- In office 13 January 2005 – 19 January 2009
- Preceded by: Ruben Shugaryan
- Succeeded by: Sergey Manassarian

Personal details
- Born: 2 October 1951 (age 75) Yerevan, Soviet Union (now Armenia)
- Spouse: Aida Gharibjanian
- Children: Anoush; Ani; Tiran
- Education: Yerevan State University
- Profession: Politician and Diplomat
- Awards: Medal of "Mkhitar Gosh"

Gegham Gharibjanian (Armenian: Գեղամ Տիրանի Ղարիբջանյան; born 2 October 1951) is an Armenian politician and diplomat. He was Ambassador Extraordinary and Plenipotentiary of Armenia to the State of Qatar, to the United Arab Emirates and to Iran, Secretary General (Head of Staff) of the National Assembly of Armenia, and Deputy Minister of the Ministry of Foreign Affairs of Armenia.

== Biography ==
Gegham Gharibjanian was born in Yerevan, Soviet Union (now Armenia) on 2 October 1951. He married in 1981, and has three children and three grandchildren. His spouse, Aida Avagian, was born in Yerevan on 14 January 1958.

== Education ==
- 1973 – Faculty of Oriental Studies, Yerevan State University
- 1994 – Higher Courses of Public Administration, University of South California (USC)

== Professional Experience ==
- Oct 1973 – Jan 1978 – Senior Adviser, Committee for Cultural Relations with Armenian Diaspora
- Jan 1978 – Jan 1981 – Interpreter of Persian language in Iran
- Jan 1981 – May 1991 – Senior Adviser, Head of department, Committee for Cultural Relations with Armenian Diaspora
- May 1991- Jun 1995 – Deputy Minister of Labour and Social Security of Armenia.
- Jul 1995- Feb 1999 – Member of the National Assembly of Armenia.

– Vice-Chairman, Chairman of the Standing Committee on Social Affairs, Health and Environment of the National Assembly
– Chairman of the Armenia – Iran Parliamentary Friendship Group
– Vice-Chairman of the Interparlamentary Committee of the National Assembly of Armenia and the Federal Assembly of the Russian Federation
– Vice-Chairman of the Social Committee to the CIS Interparliamentary Assembly
– Founder of the "Social State" Parliamentary Group

- 14 Jan 1999 – by the decree of the President of Armenia was granted the diplomatic rank of Ambassador Extraordinary and Plenipotentiary
- Jan 1999 – Jan 2005 – Ambassador Extraordinary and Plenipotentiary of Armenia to the Islamic Republic of Iran
- Aug 2001 – Jan 2005 – Ambassador Extraordinary and Plenipotentiary of Armenia to the State of Qatar (with residence in Tehran)
- Jan 2005 – Jan 2009 – Deputy Minister of Foreign Affairs of Armenia
- Jan 2009 – Feb 2012 – Secretary General (Head of Staff) of the National Assembly of Armenia
- May 2012- Sep 2018 – Ambassador Extraordinary and Plenipotentiary of Armenia to the United Arab Emirates
- May 2013 – Ambassador Extraordinary and Plenipotentiary of Armenia to the State of Qatar (with residence in Abu Dhabi)
- May 2019 - Oct 2021 – Ambassador Extraordinary and Plenipotentiary of Armenia to the State of Qatar (with residence in Doha)

== Participation in Intergovernmental Commissions ==
- From 2004 to 2009 chaired the Armenian delegation at the Armenian-Chinese, Armenian-Indian and Armenian-Lebanese Intergovernmental Commissions' meetings; was a member of the Armenian delegation at the Armenian-Russian and Armenian-Georgian Intergovernmental Commissions' meetings

== Other information ==
- 1998 – Full Member of the International Academy of Nature and Society
- 1998 – Honorary Doctor of Law of the Institute for Foreign Economic Relations and Management

== Awards ==
- 2021 – "Al Wajbah" Medal of the State of Qatar for enhancing relations between Qatar & Armenia
- 2017 – "St. Nerses the Graceful" Medal of the Armenian Apostolic Holy Church for his service to the Homeland and the Armenian people in great appreciation of his accomplishments by Karekin II, Supreme Patriarch and Catholicos of All Armenians
- 2011 – Gold medal by "Vahan Tekeyan" Foundation
- 2011 – "Mkhitar Gosh" medal by the decree of the President of Armenia
- 2009 – Letter of Gratitude from the Minister of Foreign Affairs of Armenia for his invaluable contribution to the activity of the Ministry of Foreign Affairs and advancement of the Armenian Diplomacy
- 2009 – Letter of Gratitude from the International Organizing Committee for organizing "4th Pan Armenian Games"
- 2009 – "Drastamat Kanayan" Medal by the Minister of Defense of Armenia
- 2007 – Second class order of "Saint Vladimir" of the Russian National Committee of the Public Awards
- 2007 – Medal "For strengthening cooperation" from the Police of Armenia"
- 2007 – Anniversary medal "15 years of CSTO"
- 2007 – "Fridtjof Nansen" Gold Medal
- 2006 – Medal "For the Defense of the Caucasus" from the North Caucasus Military District
- 2006 – Diploma of the National Academy of Sciences of Armenia for his contribution to Armenian-Iranian scientific and cultural relations

== Languages ==
Russian, Persian and English languages

Political offices
| Preceded by Vahagn Melikian | Ambassador to the State of Qatar; 16 May 2013–present | Incumbent |
Political offices
| Preceded by Vahagn Melikian | Ambassador to the United Arab Emirates; 12 March 2012–25 September 2018 | Succeeded by Mher Mkrtumian |
Political offices
| Preceded by Hayk Qotanyan | Secretary General (Head of Staff) of the National Assembly of Armenia; 19 January 2009 – 11 February 2012 | Succeeded by Vrej Gasparyan |
Political offices
| Preceded by Ruben Shugaryan | Deputy Minister of the Ministry of Foreign Affairs of Armenia; 13 January 2005 – 19 January 2012 | Succeeded by Sergey Manassarian |
Political offices
| Preceded by — | Ambassador to the State of Qatar (with residence in Tehran); 14 August 2001 – 27 December 2004 | Succeeded by Vahagn Melikian |
Political offices
| Preceded by Vahan Baibourtian | Ambassador to Iran; 14 January 1999 – 27 December 2004 | Succeeded by Garen Nazarian |
