= Carl B. Jensen =

United States Marine Corps general

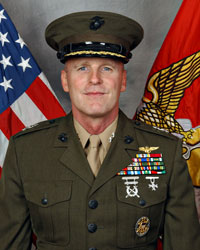
- Military career
- Allegiance: United States of America
- Branch: United States Marine Corps
- Service years: 1975 - 2011
- Rank: Major General
- Commands: HMLA-367; MAG-39; Marine Corps Air Bases Western Area/MCAS Miramar; Expeditionary Strike Group 3; Marine Corps Installations East
- Conflicts: Desert Shield/Desert Storm; Operation Iraqi Freedom/Operation Enduring Freedom
- Awards: Navy Distinguished Service Medal; Defense Superior Service Medal (2); Legion of Merit

Carl B. Jensen is a retired United States Marine Corps general officer whose last command was Marine Corps Installations East. Jensen retired from active duty on July 22, 2011 after 36 years of service.

== Biography ==
Carl B. Jensen graduated from Northern Illinois University with a Bachelor of Science degree in journalism, and also holds a Master of Science degree in National Security Strategy from the National War College. Major General Jensen was commissioned a Second Lieutenant in 1975 through the Platoon Leaders Course.

After completing The Basic School, Jensen entered flight training and was designated a Naval Aviator in August, 1977. Afterwards, he reported to the 2nd Marine Aircraft Wing, where he was assigned to HML-167, Marine Aircraft Group 29, and served in a variety of billets including Ground Safety Officer, Intelligence Officer, and Adjutant. Subsequently, Jensen was assigned to HMH-461 as the Intelligence Officer for an amphibious deployment to Norway, and upon return received orders to 2nd Battalion, 4th Marines in Okinawa, Japan where he served as the Air Liaison Officer and H&S Company Commander.

Returning from overseas, he attended Amphibious Warfare School from 1981 to 1982, and was then reassigned to the 2nd Marine Aircraft Wing where he served in HMLA-167, HMM-365, HMM-261, and MAG-26 Headquarters. During this tour, he graduated from the Marine Aviation Weapons and Tactics Squadron-1 Weapons & Tactics Instructor course and held numerous billets including Flight Line Officer, Assistant Operations Officer, Operations Officer, and Group Weapons & Tactics Officer.

From 1987 through 1990, Jensen attended the Armed Forces Staff College, and was subsequently assigned to the Department of Aviation in the Aviation Plans, Programs, and Budget Branch, Headquarters Marine Corps (HQMC). During 1990 and 1991, he deployed with MAG-50 as the Weapons & Tactics Officer in support of Operations Desert Shield/Desert Storm. Following the conflict, Jensen served alternately as the Executive Officer and then Commanding Officer of HMLA-367, and also as the aviation combat element Commander of Special Purpose MAGTF (Philippines) during the U.S. withdrawal from NAS Subic Bay.

After squadron command, Jensen became the Executive Officer of MAG-39, and subsequently attended the National War College from 1995 to 1996. Following school, he was assigned to The Joint Staff Pentagon, as the Strategic Plans Branch Chief in the J-5 Strategy Division. During 1998, Jensen then received orders to the 3rd Marine Aircraft Wing Headquarters, and subsequently commanded MAG-39 from 1999 to 2001.

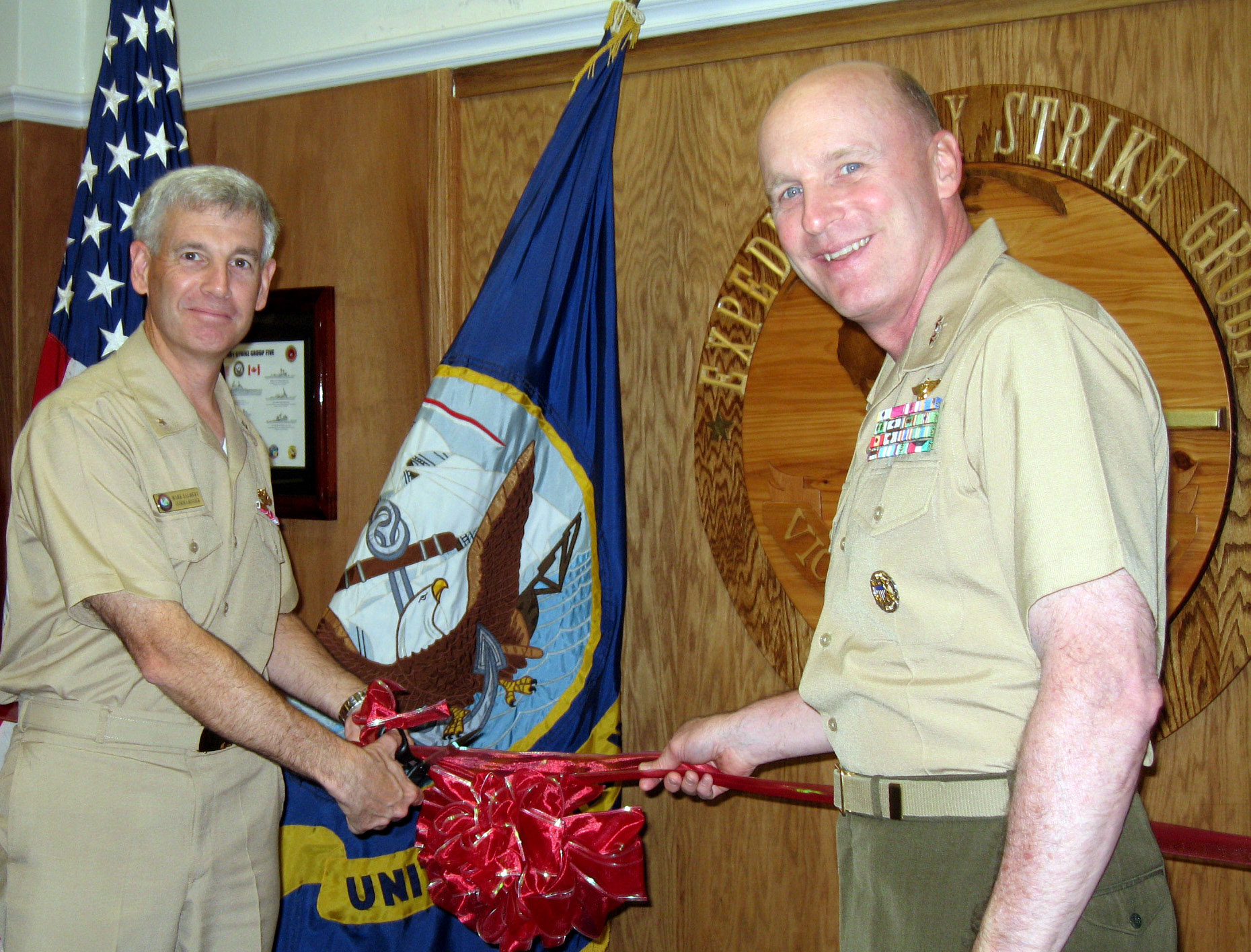
Ribbon cutting for ESG 3, RADM Balmert (left) and Jensen (right), April 2007

Following his MAG-39 command tour, Major General Jensen returned to the Pentagon for assignment as the Deputy Assistant Secretary of the Navy (Research, Development & Acquisition), Expeditionary Forces Programs. Jensen was then assigned as the Deputy Director for Operations, J-3, Joint Staff, in the National Military Command Center.

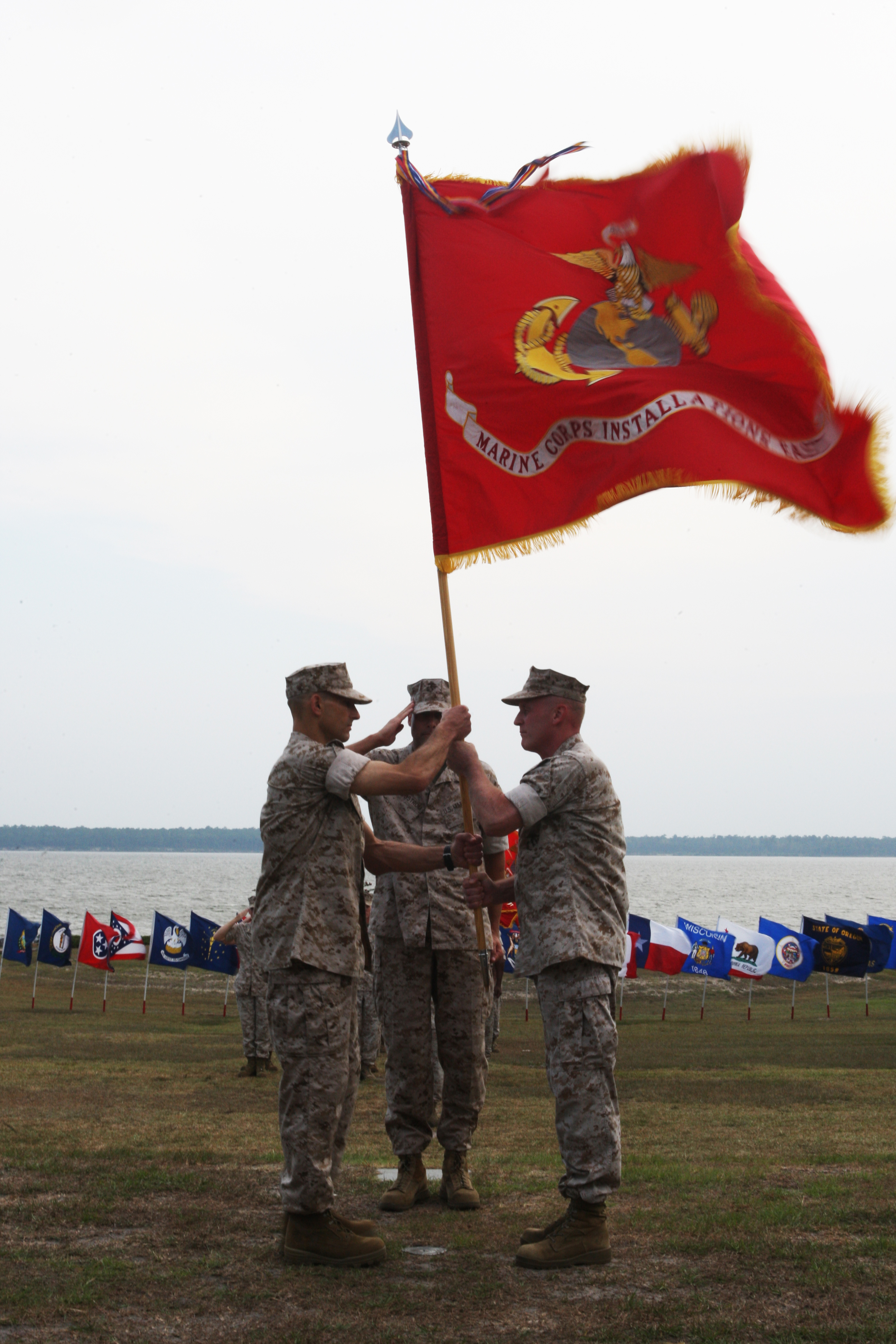
Jensen (right) turns over the colors and his command to Thomas A. Gorry

In 2004, Jensen assumed concurrent responsibilities as the Commander, Marine Corps Air Bases Western Area, and also the Commanding General, Marine Corps Air Station Miramar, San Diego, California.

In June 2005, Jensen assumed command of Expeditionary Strike Group Three and deployed in 2006 in support of Operation Iraqi Freedom/Operation Enduring Freedom. During this deployment, he twice served as Commander Task Force 158, commanding all Coalition Naval and Marine forces operating in the North Persian Gulf and Iraqi territorial waters. Further, he served as Commander Task Force 59, leading the Joint non-combatant evacuation of American citizens from Lebanon in the summer of 2006.

In January 2006, Jensen was nominated for promotion from Brigadier General to the rank of Major General.

From July 2007 to July 2008, Jensen was Deputy Commander, U. S. Marine Corps Forces Command.

In July 2008, Jensen assumed his final command, as commanding general of the Marine Corps Installations East (MCIE), Camp Lejeune, NC — commanding bases and stations on the east coast from Marine Corps Air Facility Quantico, Virginia to Marine Corps Support Facility Blount Island, Jacksonville, Florida. After three years, in July 2011, he relinquished command of MCIE and retired from active duty.

== Decorations ==
Jensen's personal decorations include:

Naval Aviator Badge
Defense Superior Service Medal w/ 1 oak leaf cluster	Legion of Merit	Meritorious Service Medal	Air Medal w/ Strike/Flight numeral "1"	Office of the Joint Chiefs of Staff Identification Badge
Navy and Marine Corps Commendation Medal w/ 2 award stars	Joint Meritorious Unit Award w/ 1 oak leaf cluster	Navy Unit Commendation w/ 2 service stars	Navy Meritorious Unit Commendation	Office of the Joint Chiefs of Staff Identification Badge
National Defense Service Medal w/ 1 service star	Southwest Asia Service Medal w/ 2 service stars	Global War on Terrorism Service Medal	Korea Defense Service Medal	Office of the Joint Chiefs of Staff Identification Badge
Navy Sea Service Deployment Ribbon w/ 5 service stars	Arctic Service Ribbon	Kuwait Liberation Medal (Saudi Arabia)	Kuwait Liberation Medal (Kuwait)	Office of the Joint Chiefs of Staff Identification Badge
