= HSV-2 Swift =

Hybrid catamaran built in 2003

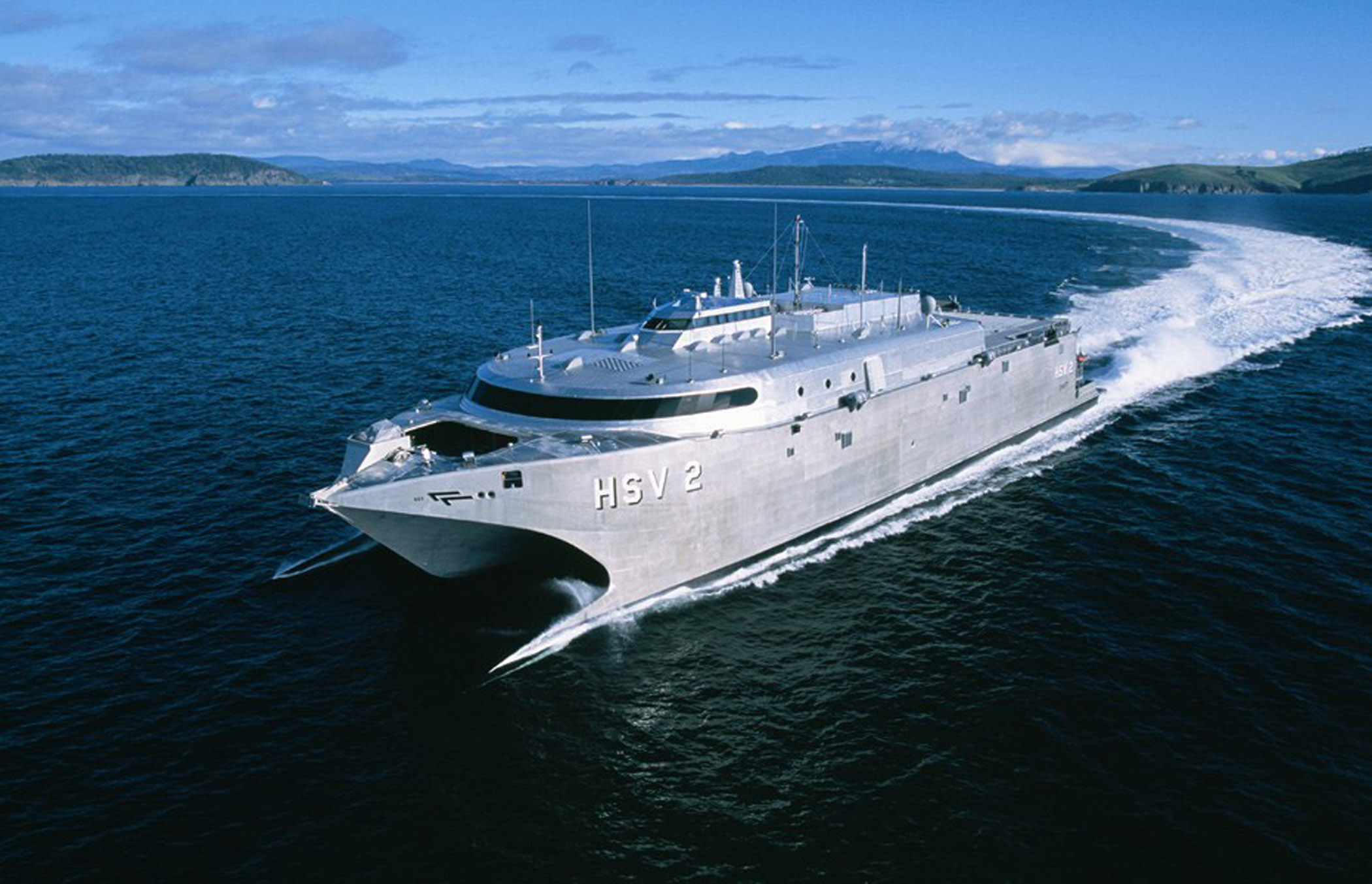

History

United States
- Name: HSV-2 Swift
- Ordered: October 2002
- Builder: Incat, Tasmania, Australia
- Yard number: 061
- Acquired: 15 August 2003
- Out of service: 2013
- Refit: October 2008
- Fate: Left U.S. MSC contracted service in 2013
- Notes: Port of registry was changed to Majuro, upon purchase of Swift by Sealift Inc. Concurrent with that her flag was changed to that of the Republic of the Marshall Islands. After being leased by the UAE, Swift started flying the Flag of the United Arab Emirates (civil ensign). May have flown national flag/naval ensign later in her UAE service but this is unconfirmed.

United Arab Emirates
- Name: Swift 1 (2013–2018); Ift (2018–Present)
- Owner: Seajets (2017–Present)
- Port of registry: Avatiu Cook Islands (2018–Present)
- Identification: Call sign: A6E2257; IMO number: 9283928; MMSI number: 470149000
- Fate: Attacked 1 October 2016; remained afloat and salvaged as of 4 October 2016. Declared unrepairable and decommissioned.
- Status: Laid up at Salamis Island

General characteristics
- Displacement: 1,668 long tons (1,695 t) full; 940 long tons (955 t) standard
- Length: 321.5 ft (98.0 m)
- Beam: 88.6 ft (27.0 m)
- Draft: 11.15 ft (3.40 m)
- Propulsion: Caterpillar 3618 marine diesel engines
- Speed: 45 knots (83 km/h; 52 mph) maximum; 30 knots (56 km/h; 35 mph) operating
- Range: 3,500 nmi (6,500 km; 4,000 mi)
- Capacity: Approximately 605 long tons (615 t); Approximately 28,740 sq ft (2,670 m^{2}) cargo deck
- Complement: 17 Contract Mariners; berthing for 107 with additional temporary berthing for 87 when seating is converted
- Crew: 35
- Armament: 4 × .50 caliber M2 Browning machine gun mounts

HSV-2 Swift is a hybrid catamaran. She was privately owned and operated by Sealift, and was originally built under the JHSV program as a proof of concept. As part of this program, she was directly leased for evaluation from her builder Incat by the United States Navy Military Sealift Command from 2003 to 2013, primarily as a mine countermeasures and sea basing test platform. Later during her official naval career she was mostly used for fleet support and humanitarian partnership missions.

In July 2015, the ship was leased by the United Arab Emirates National Marine Dredging Company and was used to carry aid through the Bab Al Mandab strait. On 1 October 2016, the ship was attacked and damaged off the coast of Yemen by Iranian-backed rebel Houthis, who at the time claimed to have sunk the ship. According to unnamed Department of Defense officials, the ship was damaged and was being towed to Eritrea. The vessel sustained serious damage to its bow, but remained afloat.

== Design and description ==
The ship is a wave-piercing, aluminum-hulled, commercial catamaran with military enhancements, such as a helicopter flight deck, vehicle deck, small boat and unmanned vehicle launch and recovery capability, and a communications suite. She features a new, modular design, which will allow her to be refitted to support missions without requiring long shipyard periods. While from the front the vessel looks like a trimaran, the center hull does not rest in the water and is not used for buoyancy. As a logistics vessel, the ship does not have water-tight compartments or weapons systems. Propulsion is provided by directional water jets, so the ship does not have propellers or a rudder for steering, and can maneuver in 3.7 m (12 ft) of water.

The HSV stands for "High Speed Vessel", and her home port while chartered as a MSC vessel was Naval Amphibious Base Little Creek in Norfolk, Virginia. The vessel had two CONMAR crews that typically rotated every three months to keep the ship deployed eleven months per year. The minimum crew size is 35; during her time with the MSC 18 were military with the balance civilian, provided through American Maritime Officers and Seafarers International Union of the United States Merchant Marine. On rare occasion that she was in a United States port, it was usually Naval Station Mayport, Florida, supporting the Fourth Fleet or Charleston, South Carolina, for major maintenance. Rota, Spain, was considered by the crew to be the "Mediterranean home away from home.

== Construction and acquisition ==
The ship was constructed by Incat in Hobart, Australia, and was leased to the United States Navy through Bollinger/Incat of Lockport, Louisiana. She was the second catamaran the navy leased to test new technologies and concepts associated with the Chief of Naval Operations's Sea Power 21 plan. The contract value for the first year was $21.7 million.

Swift was the fourth Incat-built high-speed wave piercing catamaran to enter military service, following behind HMAS Jervis Bay, United States Army Vessel (USAV) Theater Support Vessel Spearhead and USS Joint Venture.

== US flagged service ==
The first ship of this class to be used by the Navy, Joint Venture (HSV-X1), proved her military mettle during the 2003 invasion of Iraq as a forward staging platform for Marine Fleet Anti-Terrorism and United States Navy SEAL teams in the shallow waters of Umm Qasr, Iraq. The Navy hoped to build upon lessons learned from Swift and her predecessor, and eventually use the information to create a new class of littoral combat ships.

In the autumn of 2003, while operating with the Fifth Fleet, Swift completed the fastest-ever transit of the northern Great Barrier Reef from Cairns to Booby Island, Australia, averaging slightly over 39 knots (72 km/h). During flight deck certifications, Swift's crew conducted aircraft recovery while making 43 knots (80 km/h) during one recovery and had 66-knot (122 km/h) apparent winds during another recovery.

In November 2003 she began West African Training Cruise-04. She first visited the South African Navy (SAN) base at Durban on 3 November 2003. She then exercised with the SAN and the South African Air Force off Simon's Town in the Western Cape. As of early November 2003, as reported by Jane's Defence Weekly on 19 November 2003, exercises were also planned with Cameroon, Gambia, Ghana, Morocco, Senegal, and Sierra Leone. Swift had embarked a small United States Marine Corps (USMC) detachment for the cruise, 'which will draw on Norway Air-Landed Marine Expeditionary Brigade equipment for the exercises.' The Jane's Defence Weekly story said that Marine reservists will practice with the NALMEB (Norway Air-Landed Marine Expeditionary Brigade) equipment, and the cruise would also be used to evaluate an experimental lightweight ROWPU that was at that time being tested by the USMC warfighting laboratory. The vessel returned in early 2004. In 2004, the United States Navy tested the Australian built Swift in the multinational exercise RIMPAC.

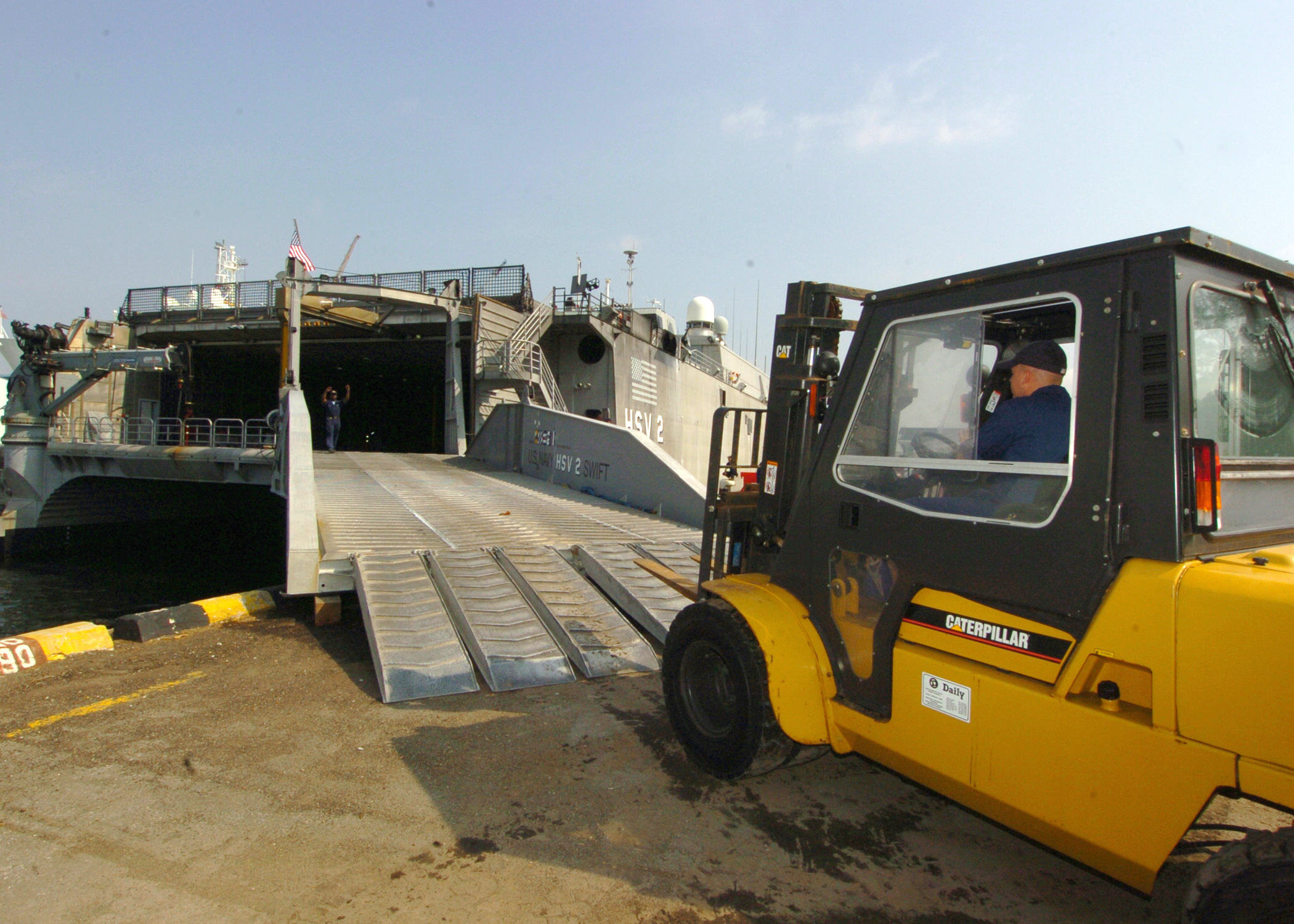
A forklift offloads supplies from Swift in Singapore, 30 January 2005

In January 2005, Swift was tapped to provide logistical assistance during the tsunami relief effort in North Sumatra. Swift departed Naval Station Ingleside, Texas, on 3 January 2005. Swift was in Pearl Harbor 15 January 2005, on the way to provide assistance following the tsunami. The ship arrived in Singapore on 30 January 2005, Belawan, Indonesia 3 February 2005 and Sattahip, Thailand, on 7 February 2005.

Prior to arriving in the tsunami affected region, crews were swapped in Pearl Harbor, with Gold crew relieving Blue crew in less than eight hours. Swift embarked a helicopter detachment, and served as a base of operations for two helicopters and their crew for 30 consecutive days at sea. During the operation, Swift sailed for 30 straight days, supported a helicopter detachment and support crew and conducted two underway replenishments.

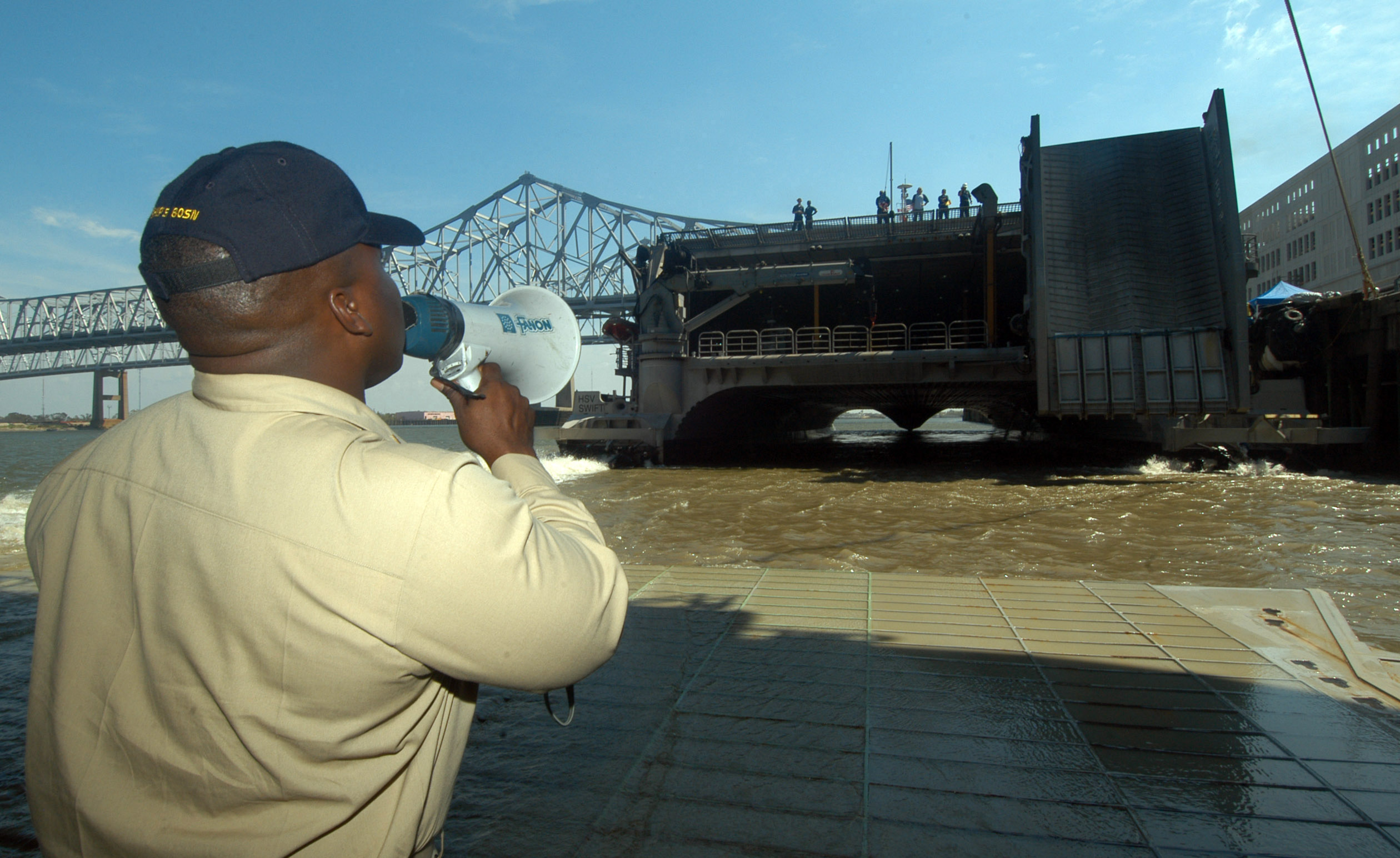
Swift in New Orleans following Katrina, 6 September 2005

In 2005, Swift played a major role in Hurricane Katrina relief efforts. With most roads inaccessible along the Gulf Coast, Swift and her crew delivered the necessary supplies by water, traversing the Mississippi River multiple times hauling humanitarian aid between Pensacola, Florida, and New Orleans, Louisiana.

During the 2006 Israel-Lebanon conflict, Swift was used to transport humanitarian assistance materials from Cyprus to Beirut.

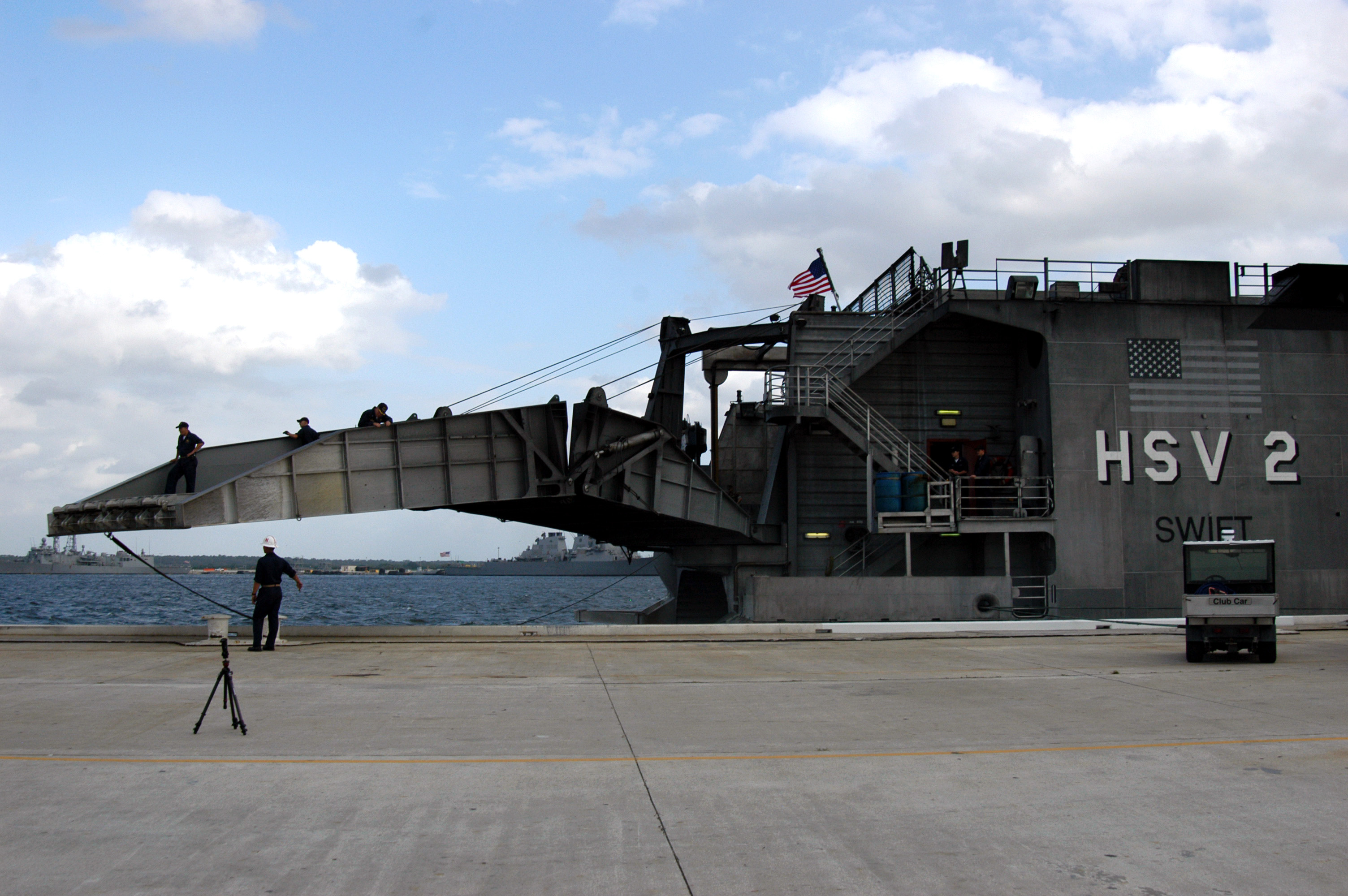
Swift showing ramp detail, returning to Mayport after GFS deployment, 30 September 2007.

Swift departed Naval Station Mayport, Florida, on 25 April 2007, to serve as a Global Fleet Station (GFS). The ship hosted more than 1,000 host nation military and civilian personnel during twelve visits to seven countries such as Belize, Dominican Republic, Guatemala, Honduras, Jamaica, Nicaragua and Panama. In these countries, personnel on board Swift conducted 39,890 hours of subject matter expert exchanges in such areas as leadership, small boat operations, port security and small unit tactics.

The six-month U.S. Navy sponsored GFS deployment tested the Navy's GFS concept, a maritime security cooperation initiative aimed at strengthening global partnerships through training and cooperation activities. Swift transported U.S. military training teams to conduct maritime training with regional civil and maritime services.

During the last half of the deployment, more than 20,000 lb (9,100 kg) of medical and food supplies were donated through Project Handclasp. Swift hosted numerous dignitaries, including the Prime Minister of Jamaica and U.S. Ambassadors to Panama, Guatemala, Nicaragua, Honduras and Jamaica.

The GFS pilot mission was completed on 30 September 2007, when Swift returned to Naval Station Mayport, Florida.

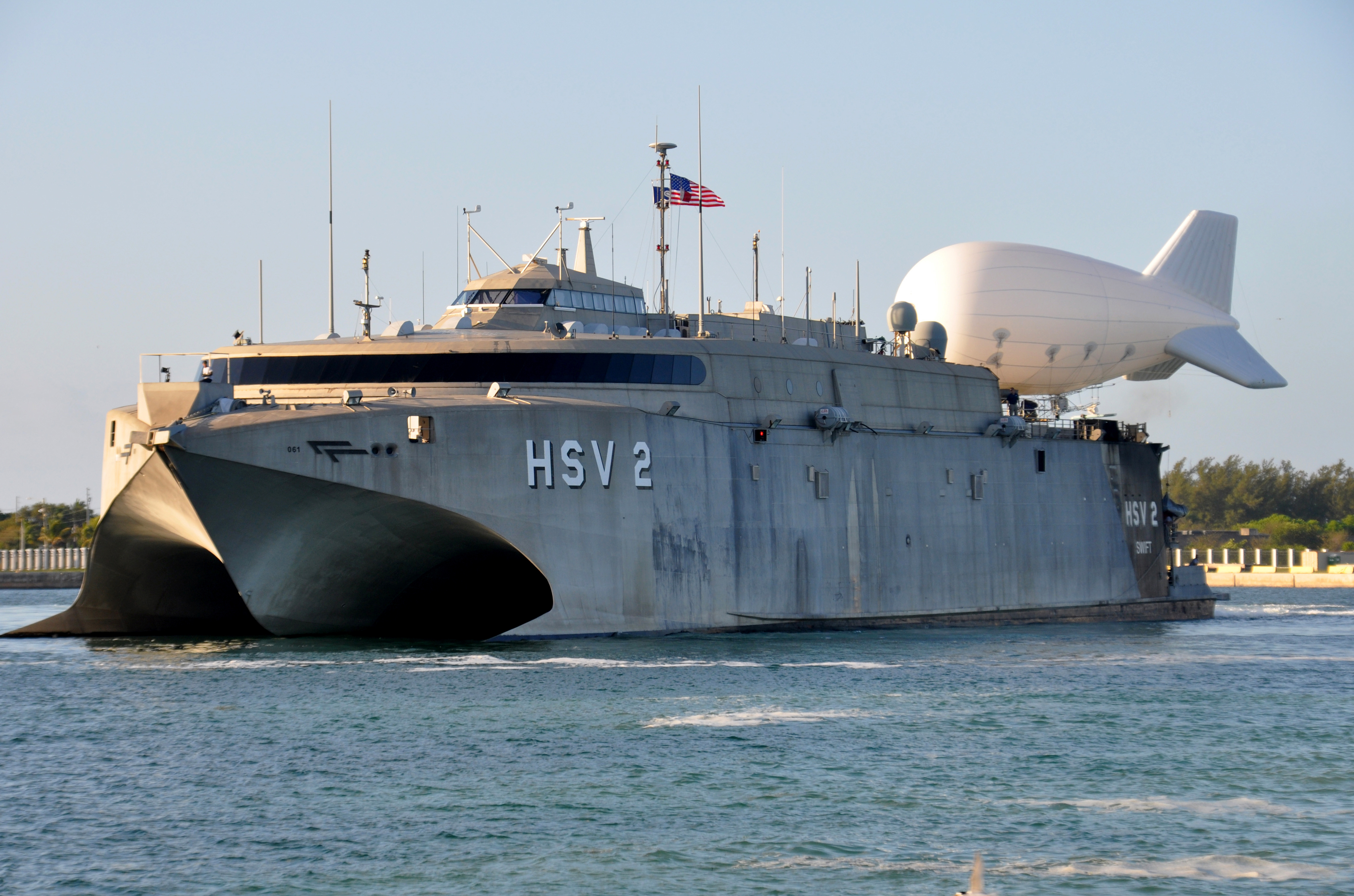
Swift with Tethered Aerostat

On 5 May 2010, Swift, along with various embarked Navy and Marine Corps units, departed Naval Station Mayport for a five-month deployment for Southern Partnership Station (SPS) 2010.

While in port, Swift received 140 Project Handclasp pallets and two fire engines. The Wisconsin National Guard State Partnership Program donated the fire engines to Project Handclasp for transportation to Nicaragua, their partner nation.

Project Handclasp is a U.S. Navy program that accepts and transports educational, humanitarian and goodwill material on a space-available basis aboard U.S. Navy ships for distribution to foreign nation recipients.

SPS is an annual deployment of various specialty platforms to the U.S. Southern Command (USSOUTHCOM) area of responsibility (AOR) in the Caribbean and Latin America. The mission's primary goal is information sharing with navies, coast guards, and civilian services throughout the region.

In April 2013, a TIF-25K Tethered Aerostat (unmanned blimp) was tested from the stern of Swift. The aerostat could be positioned 3,000 feet (910 m) above the vessel for surveillance.

Swift was to be replaced with USNS Spearhead when that vessel came into service. Originally chartered in July 2003 as an interim mine warfare command and support ship for "transformational" mine warfare modular mission payload initiatives, the ship had been sent to the Persian Gulf, South Africa, the North Sea, and Hawaii within one year. Other locations included the Gulf of Mexico, Singapore, Thailand, Sicily, Spain, and southern California. As mine demonstration missions wore down, Swift was used in partnership missions, performing extended cruises to Africa, the Caribbean, and Central and South America. The five-year charter was renewed in 2008, and the ship continued to serve until the introduction of Joint High Speed Vessels. Swift ended her service with Military Sealift Command in 2013.

== UAE flagged service ==
Swift returned to Incat at Hobart in July 2013 for refit for sale or charter. As of July 2015 the vessel was reportedly being operated by the UAE's National Marine Dredging Company. The ship was used to carry aid, wounded, and passengers as part of the Saudi-led intervention in Yemen through Bab Al Mandeb strait.

=== Attack off the coast of Yemen ===
On 1 October 2016, Iranian-backed rebel Houthis claimed to have attacked and sunk Swift off the Yemeni coast around Bab-el-Mandeb strait. The UAE military reported Swift had been involved in an "incident", but there were no casualties. UAE military reported that Swift was carrying aid when she was attacked and that the ship did not have any military capacity. Saudi Arabia reported that their forces rescued passengers from a damaged UAE ship at dawn on 1 October 2016. There are conflicting reports as to whether she was en route to Aden, a regular destination, or Mokha at the time she was attacked. Unnamed U.S. Defense officials reported that four "shoulder-fired rockets" were used in the attack, but Houthis said it was a C-802/Noor anti-ship missile. According to open source naval analyst and retired Navy Captain Chris Carlson, the shrapnel damage to Swift indicates she was hit by EFP warhead, most likely a C-802.

US Navy destroyers USS Mason and USS Nitze, and amphibious transport dock USS Ponce were dispatched to the area "to ensure that shipping continues unimpeded in the strait and the vicinity." Mason and Ponce were subsequently attacked on 9 October, 12 October and again on 15 October. U.S. Defense officials said that Swift was in tow to Eritrea as of 3 October 2016. Later photographs proved that she was still afloat, albeit heavily damaged, as of 5 October 2016.

== Move to Greece ==
Social media reports showed her afloat in a Greek port in July 2017 with significant damage to the port bow. As of July 2017, Swift 1 is reportedly now owned by Greek ferry company Seajets. In 2018 she was renamed Ift.

== Gallery ==
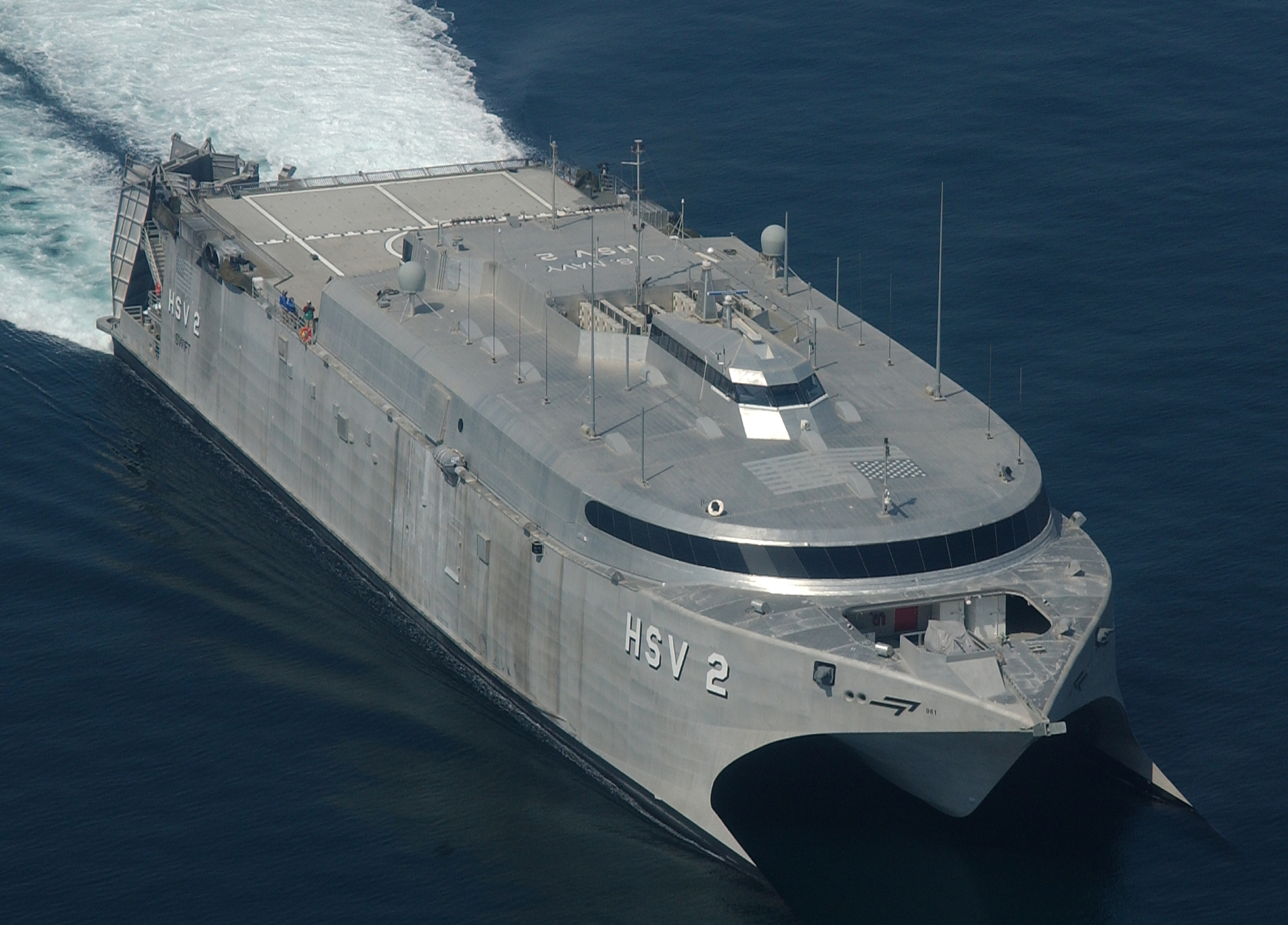
HSV-2 Swift navigates the waters off the coast of Southern Iraq

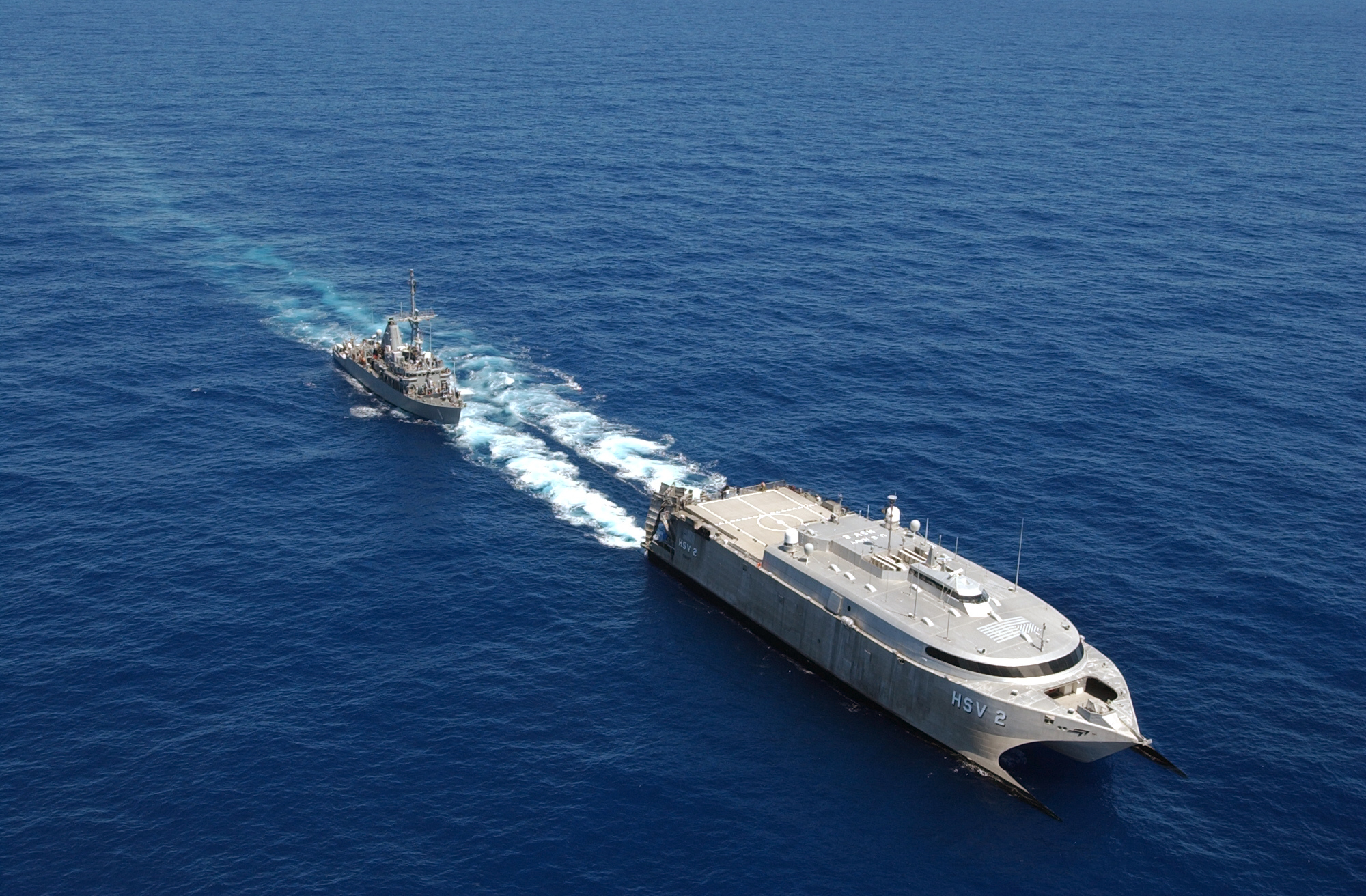
Swift refuels Avenger during RIMPAC 2004

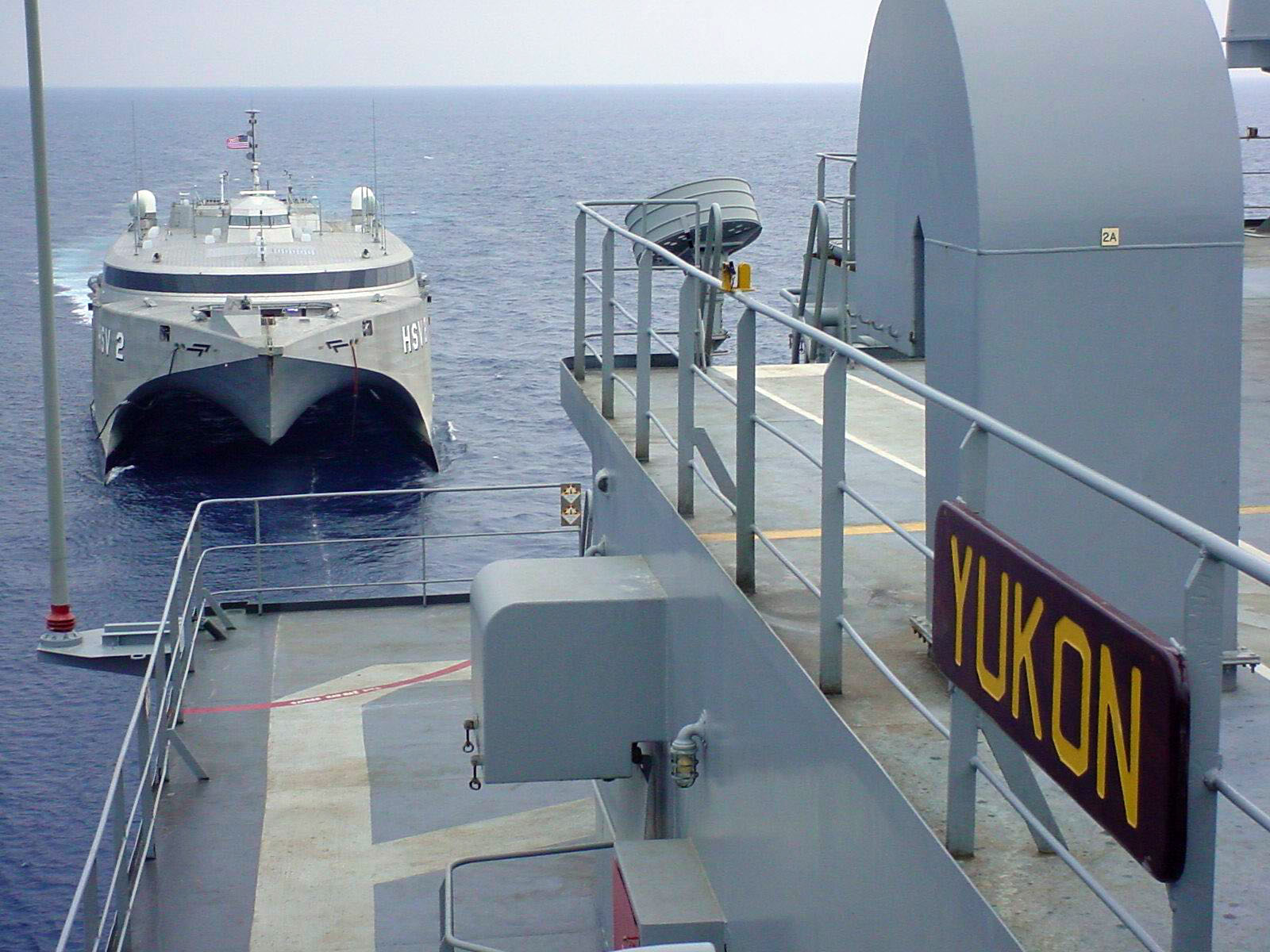
Swift refuels astern from USNS Yukon, 18 February 2005.

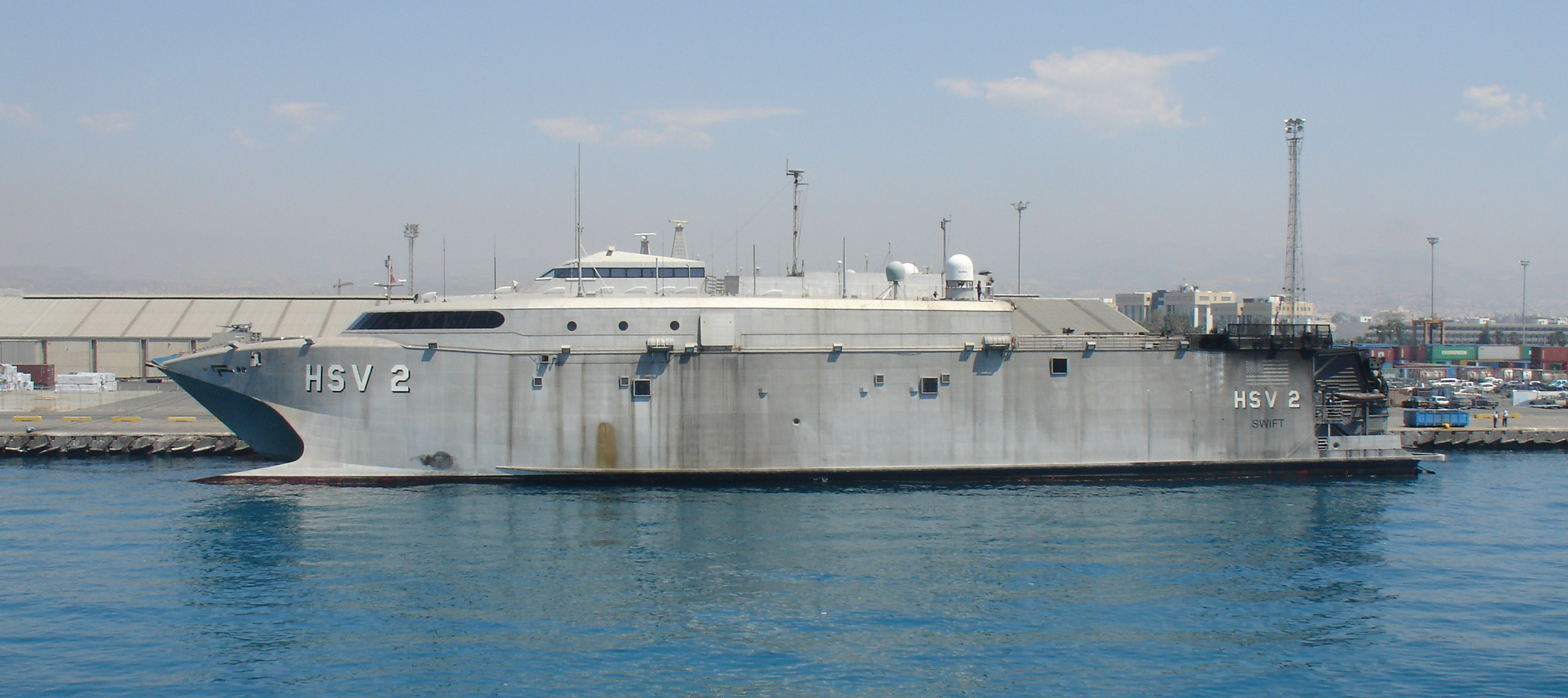
Swift in Limassol Port in July 2006, during the 2006 Israel-Lebanon conflict

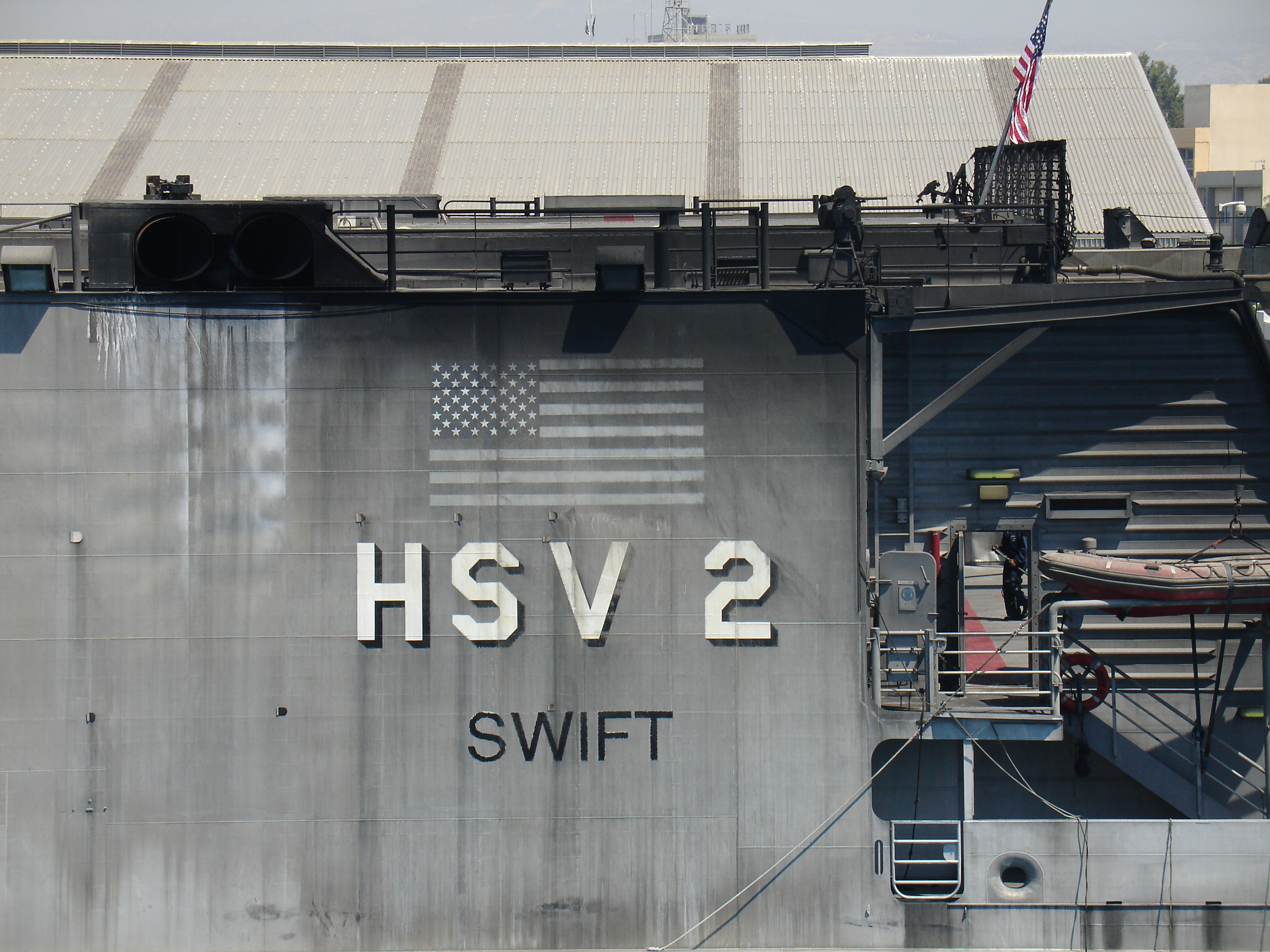
Swift in Limassol Port

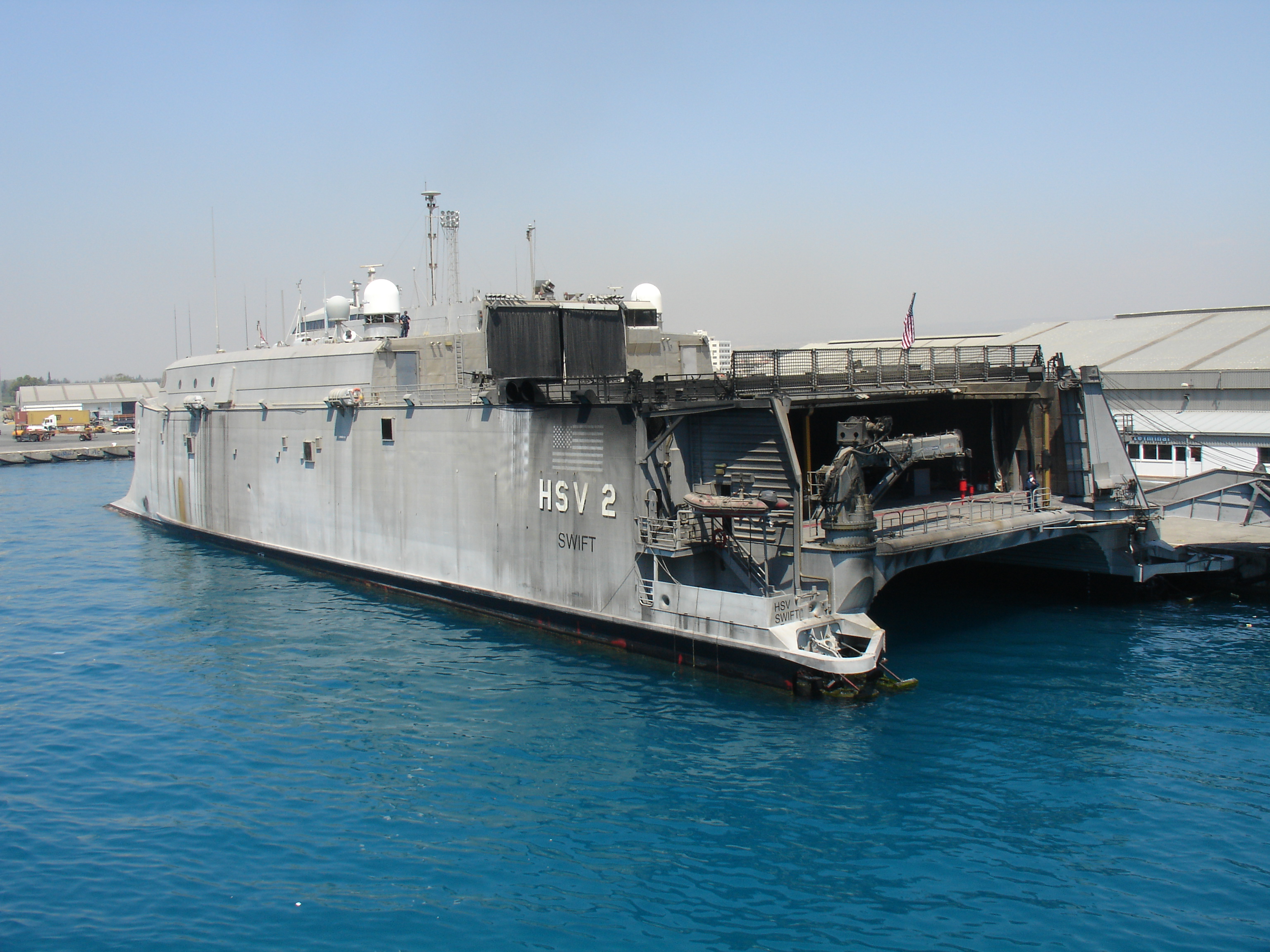
Rear view of Swift while in Limassol Port

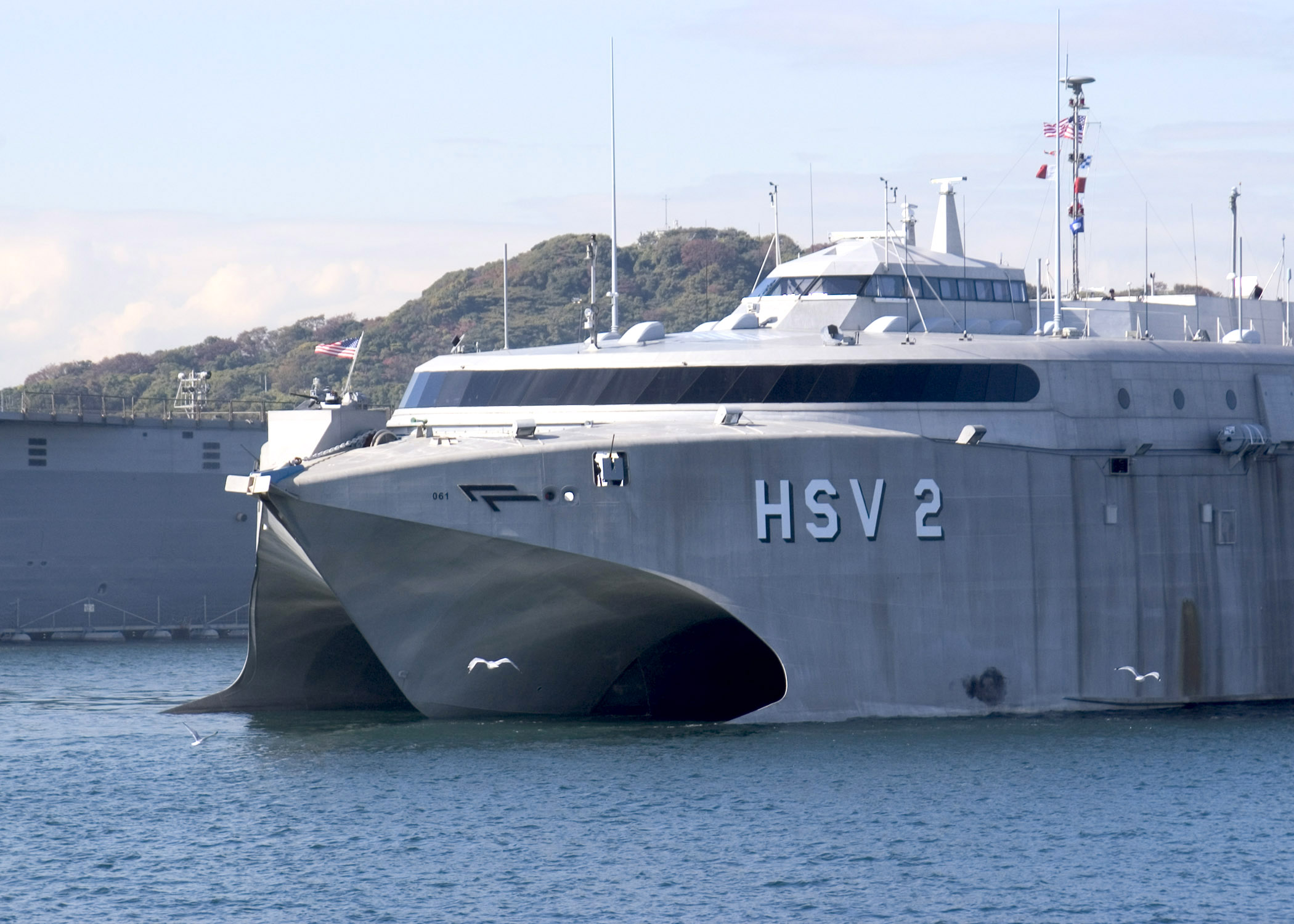
Swift navigates through Yokosuka Bay in Yokosuka, Japan

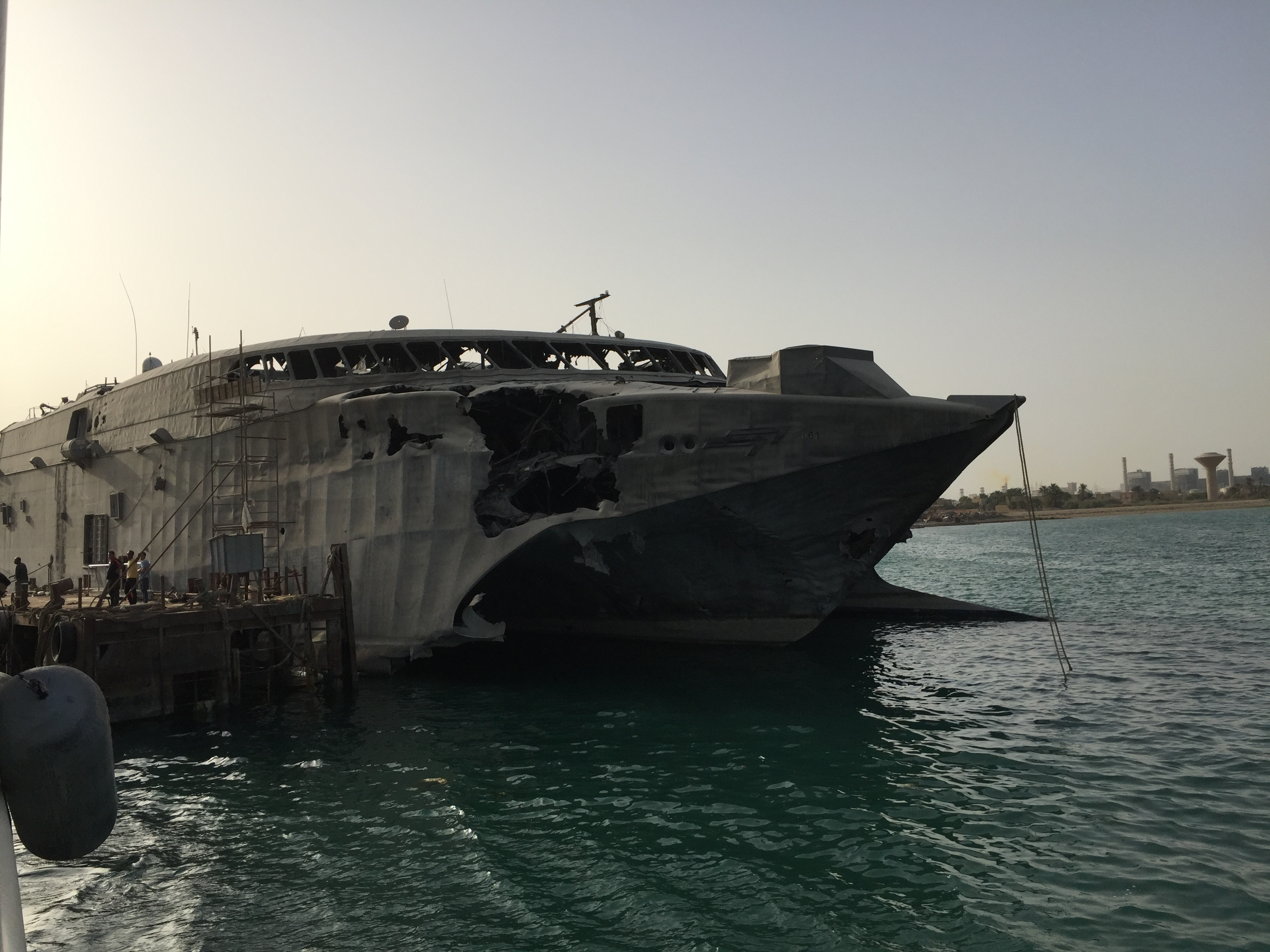
Swift in port at Oceandro Large Yacht shipyard, Port Suez, Egypt. Damage to the starboard bow from the alleged Houthi rebel attack is clearly visible.

== Related developments ==
- HMAS Jervis Bay (AKR-45) (Royal Australian Navy)
- HSV-1 Joint Venture (US Navy)
