= 2003 Camp Pennsylvania attack =

American court-martial case

- Part of Opposition to the Iraq War
- Date: March 23, 2003
- Location: Camp Pennsylvania, Kuwait
- Motive: Opposition to the Iraq War
- Perpetrator: Hasan Karim Akbar
- Deaths: 2
- Injuries: 14
- Verdict: Guilty
- Convictions: Premeditated murder (2 counts); Attempted premeditated murder (3 counts)
- Sentence: Death

In the early morning hours of March 23, 2003, at Camp Pennsylvania, Kuwait, during the start of the United States invasion of Iraq, Sergeant Hasan Karim Akbar (born Mark Fidel Kools on April 21, 1971) threw four hand grenades into three tents in which other members of the 101st Airborne Division were sleeping, and fired his rifle at fellow soldiers in the ensuing chaos. Army Captain Christopher S. Seifert was fatally shot in the back, and Air Force Major Gregory L. Stone was killed by a grenade. Fourteen other soldiers were wounded by Akbar, mostly from grenade shrapnel.

In the United States v. Hasan K. Akbar trial, Akbar's military defense attorneys contended that Akbar had psychiatric problems, including paranoia, irrational behavior, insomnia, and other sleep disorders. In April 2005, he was convicted and sentenced to death for the murders of Seifert and Stone. The Army Court of Criminal Appeals affirmed the sentence on July 13, 2012, and the United States Court of Appeals for the Armed Forces affirmed the decision on August 19, 2015.

Akbar was the first soldier since the Vietnam War to be convicted for "fragging" fellow soldiers overseas during wartime. He continues to be confined at the United States Disciplinary Barracks awaiting execution.

== Background ==
Akbar was born Mark Fidel Kools on April 21, 1971, and grew up in Watts, Los Angeles, California. His father, John Kools, converted to Islam while in prison on a gang-related charge, and changed his surname to Akbar before his release in 1974. Akbar's mother later converted to Islam before marrying William M. Bilal, also a Muslim convert. She took the name Quran Bilal. She changed her son's name to Hasan Karim Akbar, to reflect his father's surname and their religion. He was raised from a young age as a Muslim. In 1988, Akbar was admitted to the University of California, Davis. He graduated nine years later in 1997 with Bachelor's degrees in both Aeronautical and Mechanical Engineering. The university said that Akbar had stopped and restarted his studies during those years, lengthening the time it took him to complete his degrees. He participated in the Reserve Officers' Training Corps during college, but did not receive a commission. Deeply in debt, he joined the Army as an enlisted member.

A few years later, Akbar was an E-5 sergeant and a combat engineer assigned to Company A, 326th Engineer Battalion, 101st Airborne Division. By March 2003, elements of the division were staging at Camp Pennsylvania, a U.S. military encampment in the Northern desert of Kuwait, in connection with the upcoming invasion of Iraq.

== Attack ==
In the early morning hours of March 23, 2003, Akbar turned off a power generator which was operating lights in the area where the attack occurred. Next, Akbar threw four M67 fragmentation hand grenades into three tents in which other members of the division were sleeping, causing numerous injuries. In the resulting chaos, Akbar also fired his M4 rifle at fellow soldiers. Army Captain Christopher S. Seifert, assistant S-2 (intelligence and security officer) of the 1st Brigade, 101st Airborne Division and Idaho Air National Guard Major Gregory L. Stone, a member of the 124th Air Support Operations Squadron, were killed. Seifert, age 27, was fatally shot in the back, while Stone, age 40, suffered 83 shrapnel wounds. Fourteen other soldiers were injured.

== Court-martial ==
United States v. Hasan K. Akbar
- Court: General court-martial convened by Commander, XVIII Airborne Corps
- Full case name: United States v. Hasan K. Akbar
- Decided: April 21, 2005

Case history
- Appealed to: United States Court of Appeals for the Armed Forces

Court membership
- Judges sitting: Colonel Dan Trimble; Colonel Patrick J. Parrish; Colonel Stephen Henley

Case opinions
- Decision by: Military Jury composed of 9 officers 6 senior NCOs

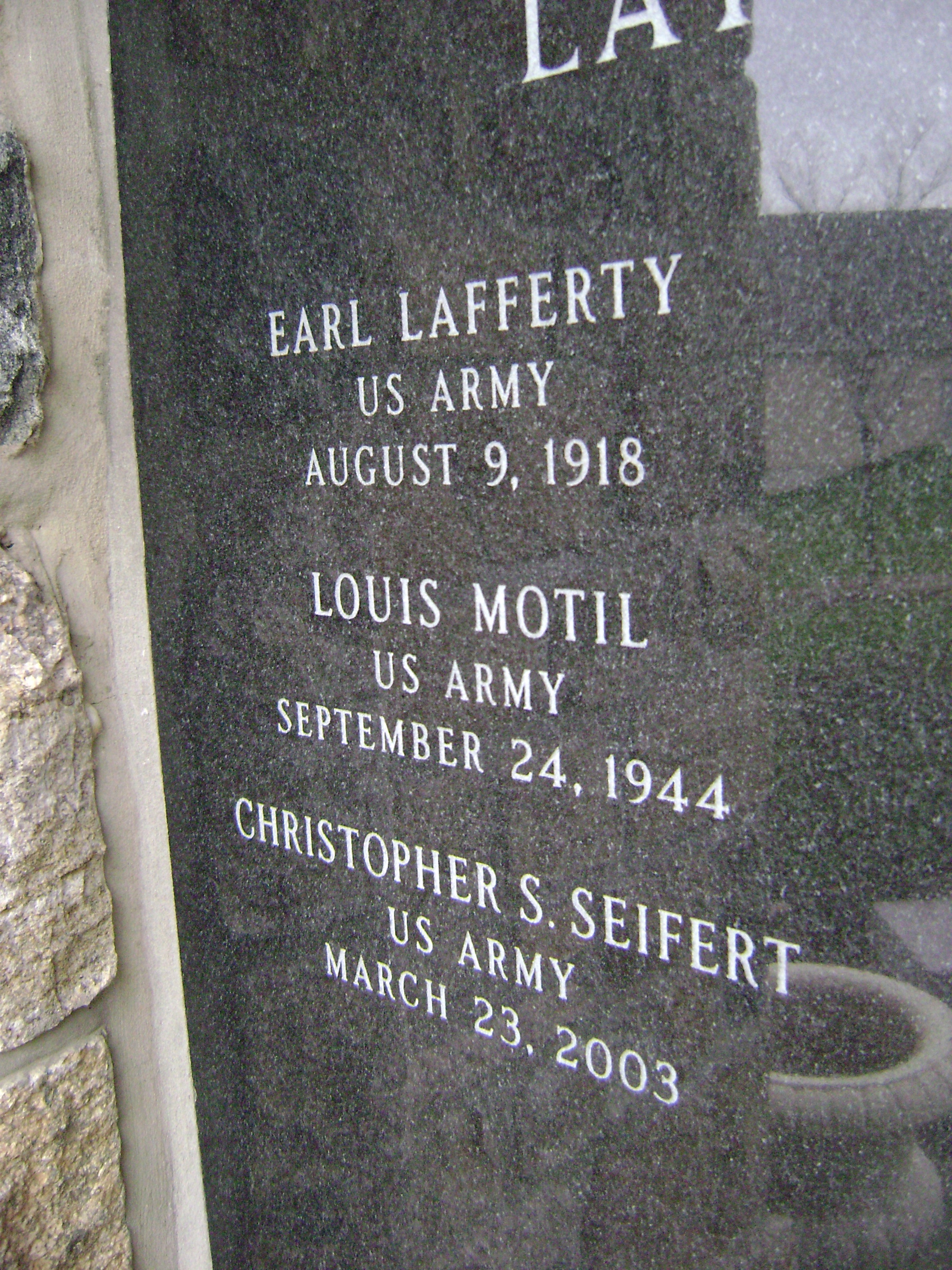
The inscription of Christopher Seifert was placed on the Williams Township Veterans Memorial in Williams Township, Northampton County, Pennsylvania.

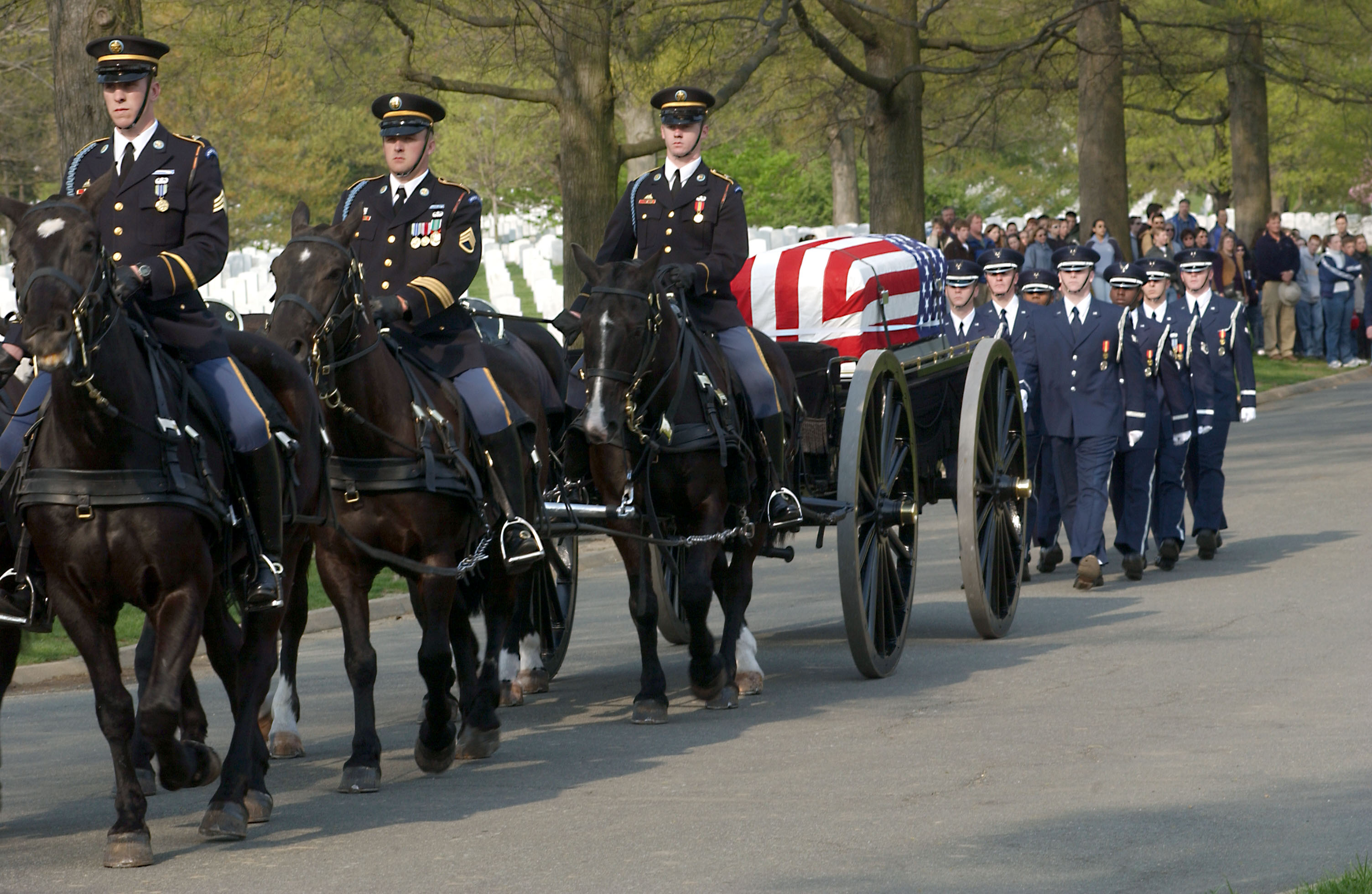
Funeral of Gregory L. Stone at Arlington National Cemetery (April 17, 2003)

In 2005, Akbar, the sole suspect, was tried by court martial at Fort Bragg, North Carolina, before a military jury of nine officers, ranking from Major to Colonel, and six senior non-commissioned officers. The jury was composed of thirteen men and two women. Although Akbar confessed to the crimes, his lawyers claimed during the 2005 trial that he had a history of mental illness which was known to the military.

Background accounts of Akbar's life suggested previous difficulties in adjusting to university and to the military. His father John Akbar was reported by the Associated Press as saying that his son had told him of complaining to superiors about "religious and racial harassment." The defense did not produce any witnesses at his court martial related to this assertion.

Akbar's superiors considered his performance in the Army substandard. While assigned to the 326th Engineer Battalion, he was demoted from a squad leader position and given lower-level tasks. Fellow soldiers said that Akbar was isolated, "rarely in the company of others and was seen talking to himself." In Akbar's early years with the unit, superiors had noted the sergeant had "an attitude problem". Military officials attributed Akbar's motive in the immediate case to resentment. Akbar was reported as having been recently reprimanded for insubordination, and was told he would not join his unit's push into Iraq. Excerpts from his diary have been released. In an entry dated February 4, 2003, Akbar referred to mistreatment by his fellow soldiers:

"I suppose they want to punk me or just humiliate me. Perhaps they feel that I will not do anything about that. They are right about that. I am not going to do anything about it as long as I stay here. But as soon as I am in Iraq, I am going to try and kill as many of them as possible."

In another entry written before the attack, Akbar wrote, "I may not have killed any Muslims, but being in the army is the same thing. I may have to make a choice very soon on who to kill." Prosecutors alleged in the court martial that his diary entries, together with his actions of stealing hand grenades and turning off the generator that lit the camp, showed that the attack was premeditated. His conviction on these charges led to the death sentence.

His military defense attorneys said that Akbar was diagnosed with psychiatric problems at the age of 14. He had suffered worsening symptoms in the military, which included "paranoia, irrational behavior, insomnia and other sleep disorders," making it impossible for him to do his job. During his court martial, Akbar tried to explain his actions: he said he felt his life was "in jeopardy" and he had "other problems". At one point during his trial, Akbar smuggled a sharp object out of a conference room. He asked the military policeman guarding him to remove his hand cuffs so he might use the restroom. When the MP removed the restraints, Akbar stabbed the MP in the shoulder and neck before being wrestled to the ground by another MP. The presiding judge did not allow this attack to be admitted as evidence prior to sentencing.

On April 21, 2005, Akbar was found guilty of two counts of premeditated murder and three counts of attempted premeditated murder. He was sentenced to death on April 28 after the jury deliberated for approximately seven hours.

On November 20, 2006, Lieutenant General John R. Vines, commander of the XVIIIth Airborne Corps, affirmed the death sentence against Akbar. Under an automatic appeal because of the sentence, the case was forwarded to the Army Court of Criminal Appeals, which upheld the sentence on July 13, 2012. Afterwards, the case was automatically appealed to the United States Court of Appeals for the Armed Forces, which also upheld the conviction and sentence. Akbar had a final right of appeal to the United States Supreme Court, which denied certiorari on October 3, 2016. Absent a new appeal, Akbar's appeals are exhausted and his conviction and sentence stand. The next step in his case requires the President of the United States in his role as Commander in Chief to order the execution to take place, which is currently done by any possible execution form, which can be by electric chair, gas chamber, lethal injection, or firing squad. Akbar continues to be confined at the United States Disciplinary Barracks awaiting disposition of his sentence. Under current rules with the Nidal Hasan execution, it could be held in South Carolina (North Carolina has a moratorium on executions) or the said barracks.

== See also ==
- 2005 deaths of Phillip Esposito and Louis Allen
- 2009 Fort Hood shooting
- 2014 Fort Hood shootings
- Michael Mulligan, lead prosecutor for the case
