= Combined Joint Task Force 180 =

US-led multinational military formation in Afghanistan War

Combined Joint Task Force 180 was a provisional multinational land formation, primarily made up of units from the United States Army, that fought in the War in Afghanistan (2001–2021), especially in the initial invasion phase of 2001-2002. It was active from May 2002 to 2003/05. It was the senior headquarters in country reporting to United States Central Command.

Previously Joint Task Force 180 had served as the headquarters leading the U.S. intervention in Haiti in 1994 ("Operation Uphold Democracy"). Again, it was built around the XVIII Corps. From May 2002 to March 2003 the U.S. formation that directed all Enduring Freedom operations in Afghanistan was led by Lieutenant General Dan K. McNeill. It was initially a three-star headquarters designated Combined Joint Task Force 180 (CJTF-180), a corps level headquarters whose staff members were provided by the headquarters of the XVIII Airborne Corps and other formations.

== Arrival ==
When the 10th Mountain Division headquarters arrived in Afghanistan in late 2001, its role was to serve as a forward HQ for the Combined Forces Land Component Command (CFLCC), the headquarters in Kuwait that oversaw all ground force operations throughout Central Command’s area of responsibility. The 10th Mountain Division’s headquarters, in turn, would command all land forces inside Afghanistan. Major General Franklin L. Hagenbeck, commanding general, 10th Mountain Division, later recalled that the entire process of choosing his headquarters for CFLCC (Forward) had been improvised, providing little time for his staff to prepare. CFLCC (Forward) later became CJTF Mountain. It was this headquarters that ran Operation Anaconda.

The mission of CJTF-180 was to conduct operations to destroy remaining Al Qaeda/hostile Taliban command control and other hostile anti-Islamic Transitional Government of Afghanistan elements, trains Afghan National Army, and conducts directed information operations, civil military operations and humanitarian assistance operations in coordination with the ITGA in order to establish a stable and secure Afghanistan able to deter/defeat the re-emergence of terrorism.

In mid 2003 ("weeks" after 1 May 2003) McNeill and the bulk of his staff from the XVIII Airborne Corps that had formed the core of CJTF-180 departed Afghanistan. Command of CJTF 180 and its 11,000 personnel was passed to Major General John R. Vines, who had recently commanded Combined Task Force 82 (CTF 82). On 27 May 2003 Lieutenant General McNeill turned over command of CJTF-180 to Major General Vines. CTF 82, mostly drawn from the 82nd Airborne Division, had begun redeploying to the United States in April. Beginning in May 2003, the 10th Mountain Division headquarters and other combat and support elements of the division arrived to replace the departing forces, but this transition would take most of the summer. The 10th Mountain Division headquarters then became the staff for CJTF-180, still under Major General Vines, significantly reducing the size and capacity of the senior military command in Afghanistan. In September 2003 Brigadier General Lloyd J. Austin arrived in Afghanistan as commander of the 10th Mountain Division and Commander CJTF 180.

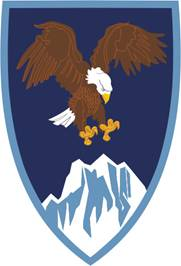
U.S. ARMY ELEMENT, COMBINED FORCES COMMAND AFGHANISTAN SSI

Then Major General David Barno arrived in Afghanistan in early October 2003 on temporary duty status. He spent roughly six weeks there as a two-star officer. In November 2003, Combined Forces Command-Afghanistan (CFC-A) was established as the U.S. led, coalition headquarters for Afghanistan. Now-Lieutenant General Barno took command. CJTF-180 was restructured as a subordinate organization of CFC-A, with the 10th Mountain Division seemingly remaining responsible for tactical combat/security operations only. One of the pillars of Barno's new counter-insurgency strategy was to order the troops to live alongside the people, and thus he allotted brigades to specific areas of responsibility, creating Regional Command East and Regional Command South. Previously the forces had conducted missions hunting insurgents without establishing long-term relationships with specific areas.

Department of Defense Authorization Appropriation statements for FY 2005 describe "...CJTF-180 is a division level organization that exercises command over 11 separate task forces; including 2 coalition battalions and other support, medical, engineering, and training units. It also has special operations capabilities assigned from U.S. and coalition nations."

On 15 April 2004 the headquarters of the U.S. Army's 25th Infantry Division arrived in Afghanistan and took command of CJTF-180 from the 10th Mountain Division. Lieutenant General Barno then decided to rename the CJTF because the “180” designation had traditionally been given to Joint task forces led by the Army's XVIII Airborne Corps. Barno chose Combined Joint Task Force 76 as the new name to evoke America’s history and the democratic spirit of 1776. The CFC-A commander was hoping that this new designation would highlight the change in command at the operational level at a time when Afghanistan appeared to be moving closer to democracy.

== Rotations ==
=== Operation Enduring Freedom I - Combined Joint Task Force Mountain, October 2001 to June 2002 ===
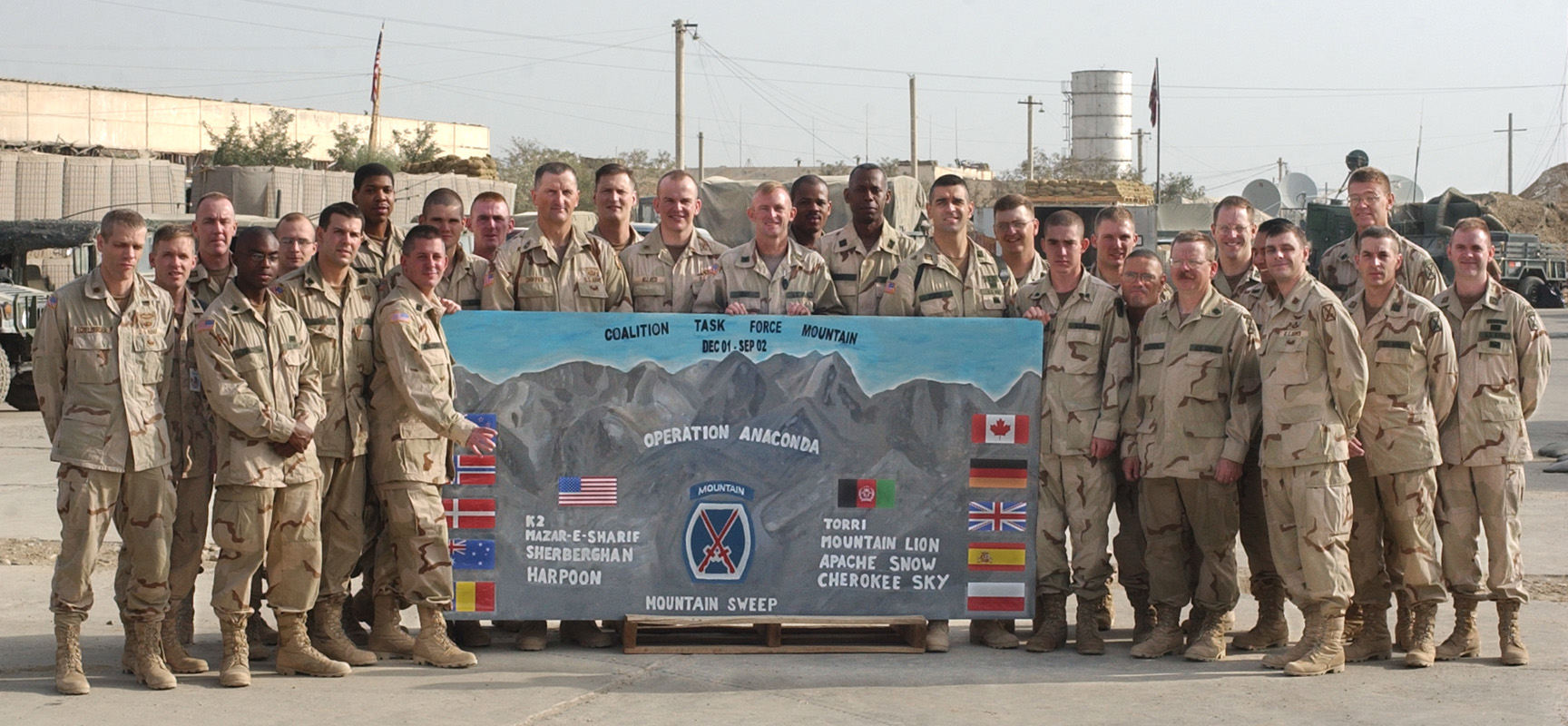
Combined Joint Task Force 180 staff in Bagram, August 2002

Command and Control
10th Mountain Division

From October 2001 to June 2002, Combined Joint Task Force Mountain's primary mission was in response to the September 11 attacks. The significance of the mission was the overthrow the Taliban's government of Afghanistan and reestablish a representative Afghanistan National government. Included in this mission were the significant Joint Special Forces operations working in cooperation with the Northern Alliance in Afghanistan. Operations began in October 2001 when 1st Battalion, 87th Infantry Regiment deployed to Uzbekistan and established operations and securing Karshi-Khanabad Air Base and serving as the Quick reaction force (QRF) in support of Special forces.

Major Combat Operations

Between November 2001 and February 2002, the Taliban government was overthrown. Military operations primarily performed by the Afghanistan Northern Alliance, supported by the 5th Special Forces Group, and other coalition and United States special operations forces, with significant firepower provided by the United States and Coalition Air Force and Navy. This operation resulted in the fall of the Taliban government. During Operation Anaconda, military operations directed against a large Taliban defensive position and stronghold in the mountainous Shah-i-Kot Valley south of the city of Gardez in eastern Afghanistan. Directed by the 10th Mountain Division, this consisted of a deliberate assault by Afghanistan forces supported by US and Coalition Special Operation Forces, and elements of the 10th Mountain Division and 101st Airborne Division. This resulted in the heaviest fighting since U.S. combat operations in Afghanistan began. Operation Mountain Lion began 15 April 2002 and involved Afghan National Army and US and Coalition Forces performing search operations in the Gardez and Khost regions. Significant participation by the Royal Marines in this operation was known as Operation Jacana. Operation Snipe began in May 2002 to search and clear a significant area in the remote Afghan mountains believed to be used as a base by Al-Qaeda and Taliban forces. During Operation Snipe, a major cave network was discovered and destroyed.

Major units involved:

- 5th Special Forces Group
- United States Army
- 2nd Brigade Combat Team, 10th Mountain Division, including units 1st Battalion, 87th Infantry Regiment and 4th Battalion, 31st Infantry Regiment
- Task Force Rakkasan 187th Infantry Regiment (United States) of the 3rd Brigade Combat Team, 101st Airborne Division
- Princess Patricia's Canadian Light Infantry
- British 45th Commando Group (Royal Marines)
- Other United States and Coalition Special Operations Forces from Australia, Canada, Denmark, Germany, France, and Norway
- United States Air Force
- United States Navy
- Northern Alliance in Afghanistan

=== Operation Enduring Freedom II, June 2002 to January 2003 ===
From June 2002 to January 2003, CJTF 180's mission was to conduct full-spectrum operations to prevent the reemergence of terror organizations and set the conditions for the growth of democracy in Afghanistan. A major effort was placed on organizing, equipping, arming and training the Afghan National Army. The CJTF headquarters was formed by Headquarters XVIII Airborne Corps (United States) under Lieutenant General Dan K. McNeill.

McNeill took control of all civil-military operations by taking command of the Combined Joint Civil Military Operations Task Force (CJCMOTF). CJTF-180 also gained operational control (OPCON) over Combined Joint Special Operations Task Force Afghanistan (CJSOTF-A), the SOF headquarters established earlier in 2002 when Joint Special Operations Task Force–North (JSOTF-N) and Combined Joint Special Operations Task Force–South (CJSOTF-S) had combined. Since the spring, the Soldiers of the CJSOTF had played a critical role in the training of the ANA and this effort continued after CJTF-180 arrived. But McNeill gave greater emphasis to the overall ANA program by taking formal control of the Office of Military Cooperation–Afghanistan (OMC-A) from the US Embassy.

In mid 2002 there was both a combat division HQ and combat brigade rotation. By July 2002 the tactical-level units from the 10th Mountain Division and the 101st Airborne Division, including TF Rakkasan, had all departed Afghanistan; the CTF Mountain headquarters staff followed in early September. They were replaced by Combined Task Force 82, formed from the headquarters of the 82d Airborne Division and led by the division’s commander, Major General John R. Vines. CTF 82’s headquarters was at Bagram Airfield, and Vines based Task Force Panther, his primary maneuver element, at Kandahar Airfield. Task Force Panther was under the command of Colonel James L. Huggins and included two infantry battalions from the 3rd Brigade, 82nd Airborne Division and one attached infantry battalion from the division’s 1st Brigade. B Company 7th Battalion of 101st (CH-47 Heavy Lift) provided aviation support. The primary maneuver element for the Huggins also enjoyed support from artillery, military intelligence, and other enabling units. Task Force Panther deployed to Afghanistan in late June 2002 and would serve under CTF 82 until 5 December 2002. At that point Task Force Devil, a unit formed around the 1st Brigade, 82d Airborne Division arrived to become the lead combat/security formation.

The 82nd Airborne Division joined with United States Army Rangers and other Coalition Special Forces to conduct Operation Mountain Sweep in August 2002, mounting five combat air Air assault missions. Combat Engineer, Aviation, and Civil Affairs Detachments also took part in the operation. Military search operations were performed south of cities of Khost and Gardez. Five Taliban weapon caches and two Taliban document caches were discovered. However the aggressiveness of the 82nd Airborne Division personnel was compared unfavourably by Afghans with the Special Forces they had seen before.

In early October 2002, the 3-505 PIR used FOB Salerno to launch Operation VILLAGE SEARCH. This operation focused on four villages near the Pakistani border suspected of harboring both Taliban fighters and weapons caches. But to engage the villages, the paratroopers used techniques that were less aggressive than those used during MOUNTAIN SWEEP, indicating that they had paid attention to the comments made by the ODAs after that operation. During VILLAGE SEARCH, unit leaders explained their intentions to village elders, asked permission to search homes, and had female Soldiers search the women. In addition, while searches were in progress, CA teams politely inquired about medical conditions and the general needs of the villages to identify potential reconstruction projects.

From January to February 2003, CJTF-180 conducted Operation Mongoose, search and sweep operations intended to locate and engage Taliban and insurgent forces in the Adi Ghar Mountain Range southeast of Kandahar. From February to March 2003 Operation Viper aimed to search Afghanistan villages and recover weapons caches and other war marteriall left by Taliban and Al-Qaeda forces. Search and sweep operations conducted to locate and engage Taliban and insurgent forces in the Baghran and Baghni Valleys, northwest of Kana.

In March 2003, Operation Valiant Strike directed to clear and search villages, gather intelligence, search for weapons caches, and seek out remaining Al-Qaeda and Taliban forces. The combined forces moved through part of Southern Afghanistan to eliminate enemy forces and weapons caches while also attempting to gather intelligence on Taliban activity in the area. Search and sweep operations intended to locate and engage Taliban and insurgent forces east of Kandahar in the Sami Ghar Mountains, performed by the 2nd and 3rd Battalions, 504th Parachute Infantry Regiment and other units of the 1st Brigade Combat Team, 82nd Airborne Division along with Romanian Infantry and Afghan troops.

Major Units Involved:

- 3rd Special Forces Group (United States)
- United States Army
- 28th Public Affairs Detachment, United States Army
- 3rd Brigade Combat Team, 82nd Airborne Division
- B Company 7th Battalion (CH-47 Heavy Lift), 101st Airborne Division
- 45 Commando Group, British Royal Marines
- United States Army Rangers
- Coalition Special Operations Forces from Australia, Canada, Denmark, Germany, France, and Norway
- United States Air Force
- United States Navy

=== Operation Enduring Freedom IV - Combined Joint Task Force 180, July 2003 to May 2004 ===
Command and Control
10th Mountain Division

From July 2003 to May 2004, CJTF-180 continued security and stabilization operations in Afghanistan to support development of representative Afghanistan Government.

Major Combat Operations

From August to September 2003 during Operation Mountain Viper, the Afghan National Army supported by the 10th Mountain Division performed sweep and search operations in Dey Chopan District, Zabul Province to uncover hundreds of suspected Taliban rebels dug in the mountains resulted in 124 militants killed. Operation Mountain Resolve, performed by the Afghan National Army and supported by the 10th Mountain Division, conducted sweep and search operations in the Nuristan and Kunar Province's in the Hindu Kush Mountain Range in November 2003. During Operation Mountain Blizzard, performed by the Afghan National Army and supported by the 10th Mountain Division conducted sweep and search operations from January to March 2004. During this operation, the coalition conducted 1,731 patrols and 143 raids and cordon-and-search operations. They killed 22 enemy combatants and discovered caches with 3,648 rockets, 3,202 mortar rounds, 2,944 rocket-propelled grenade's, 3,000 rifle rounds, 2,232 mines and tens of thousands of rounds of small-arms ammunition. Operation Mountain Storm started in March 2004 following the completion of Operation Mountain Blizzard, and was a similar operation in Khost Province. The 2nd Marine Regiment and 8th Marine Regiment also participated in this operation.

Major Units Involved:

- Afghan National Army
- 1st Brigade Combat Team, 10th Mountain Division (including 1st Battalion, 501st Airborne Infantry Regiment, 172nd Infantry Brigade from Alaska)
- 911th Forward Surgical Unit
- 2nd Marine Regiment
- 8th Marine Regiment
- Romanian 151st and 208th Infantry Battalions
- Task Force Ares (French special forces)
- United States and Coalition Special Operations Forces
- United States Air Force
- United States Navy

== Commanders ==
- Lieutenant General Dan K. McNeill
- Major General John R. Vines (until September 2003)
- Brigadier General Lloyd J. Austin (September 2003-November 2003)
