= Nidal Hasan =

Former U.S. Army officer and mass murderer (born 1970)

- Official portrait, 2007
- Born: Nidal Malik Hasan; September 8, 1970 (age 56); Arlington County, Virginia, U.S.
- Military career
- Branch: United States Army Medical Corps (until 2009)
- Service years: 1988–2009 (dismissal)
- Rank: Major (revoked)
- Awards: Army Service Ribbon; National Defense Service Medal (2); Global War on Terrorism Service Medal
- Criminal information
- Education: Virginia Western Community College (AS); Virginia Tech (BA); Uniformed Services University of the Health Sciences (MD, MPH)
- Status: Incarcerated on death row
- Motive: Opposition to military deployment Islamic extremism
- Convictions: Premeditated murder (13 counts); Attempted premeditated murder (32 counts)
- Penalty: Death

Details
- Date: November 5, 2009 approx. 1:34–1:44 p.m.
- Country: United States
- State: Texas
- Location: Fort Hood
- Targets: U.S. Army soldiers and civilians
- Killed: 13
- Injured: 32
- Weapons: 5.7×28 FN Five-seven pistol; .357 Magnum revolver (unused)
- Imprisoned at: United States Disciplinary Barracks

Nidal Malik Hasan (born September 8, 1970) is an American mass murderer, and physician, who previously served as a United States Army major and perpetrated the 2009 Fort Hood shooting, in which he murdered 13 people and injured 32 others.

Hasan, an Army Medical Corps psychiatrist, admitted to the shootings at his court-martial in August 2013. He said he wanted to stop U.S. soldiers from going to Afghanistan to kill Muslims. During the six years Hasan was a medical intern and resident at the Walter Reed Army Medical Center, concerns were raised about his job performance and behavior, specifically comments described by colleagues as "anti-American." Hasan was described as socially isolated, stressed by his work with soldiers, and upset about their accounts of warfare. Two days before the shooting, less than a month before he was due to deploy to Afghanistan, Hasan gave away many of his belongings to a neighbor.

Prior to the shooting, an investigation conducted by the Federal Bureau of Investigation (FBI) concluded Hasan's email correspondence with the late Imam Anwar al-Awlaki was related to his authorized professional research, and he was not a threat. The FBI, Department of Defense (DoD), and United States Senate all conducted investigations after the shootings. The Senate released a report describing the shooting as "the worst terrorist attack on U.S. soil since September 11, 2001." Controversially, the Army decided not to charge Hasan with terrorism. He represented himself in trial and admitted responsibility for the shooting, claiming to have switched sides in a "war on Islam" waged by the United States. In 2013, a jury panel of 13 officers convicted him of 13 counts of premeditated murder and 32 counts of attempted premeditated murder, and unanimously recommended he be dismissed from the service and sentenced to death.

Hasan is currently incarcerated at the United States Disciplinary Barracks at Fort Leavenworth, Kansas. In early October 2026, President Donald Trump approved his execution by firing squad, whereupon acting Secretary of the Army Adam Telle scheduled it to be carried out at Fort Hood on December 3, 2026, at 1 p.m. CST (7 p.m. UTC). Subsequently, Secretary of Defense Pete Hegseth announced it would be livestreamed, which sparked widespread backlash. The planned livestream was canceled by Trump as a result. If Hasan's execution is carried out, he will be the first member of the U.S. Armed Forces to be executed since John A. Bennett, who was hanged for rape and attempted murder in 1961, and the first member of the U.S. Armed Forces to be executed by firing squad since Dan J. Lee in 1945.

== Early life ==
Hasan's 1986 high school yearbook photo

Nidal Malik Hasan was born on September 8, 1970, at Virginia Hospital Center in Arlington County, Virginia. His parents were naturalized American citizens of Palestinian origin; they had immigrated years earlier from al-Bireh, a city in the West Bank near Jerusalem.

Raised in the Muslim faith with his two younger brothers, Hasan attended Wakefield High School in Arlington for his freshman year in 1985. His family moved to Vinton, Virginia, near Roanoke, in 1986, where his father had moved a year earlier to set up what would become a number of family-owned businesses, including a market, restaurant, and bar.

Hasan graduated from Roanoke's William Fleming High School in 1988. His father died in 1998 at the age of 51; his mother died three years later at the age of 49. One of his brothers continues to live in Virginia, while the other moved to Jerusalem.

== Military service, higher education and medical career ==
Hasan's 1988 High School Senior Portrait

Second lieutenant Hasan in 2000 as a student at the Uniformed Services University of the Health Sciences

Hasan enlisted in the United States Army in 1988 after graduating from high school. He attended college during this time, earning an associate degree in science from Virginia Western Community College in 1992. In 1995, he graduated from Virginia Tech with a bachelor's degree in biochemistry. He completed both of these programs with Latin honors. He was commissioned as an officer in the Army Medical Department in 1997, and enrolled at the Uniformed Services University of the Health Sciences (USUHS) in Bethesda, Maryland.

Hasan's performance was marginal while enrolled at USUHS. He was on academic probation during much of the six years he required to complete the four-year curriculum and graduate medical school. Upon graduation in 2003, Hasan completed his internship and residency in psychiatry at the Walter Reed Army Medical Center (WRAMC). He completed his psychiatry training with a two-year fellowship in disaster and preventive psychiatry, earning a master's degree in public health. During his training at Walter Reed, he received counseling and extra supervision.

According to The Washington Post, Hasan made a presentation titled "The Quranic World View as It Relates to Muslims in the U.S. Military" during his senior year of residency at WRAMC; it was not well received by some attendees. He suggested the U.S. Department of Defense "should allow Muslims [sic] Soldiers the option of being released as 'Conscientious objectors' to increase troop morale and decrease adverse events." On a previous slide, he explained "adverse events" could be refusal to deploy, espionage, or killing of fellow soldiers.

Hasan in 2003, the year he graduated from the Uniformed Services University of the Health Sciences

Retired Colonel Terry Lee, after working with Hasan, recalled the fatal shooting of two recruiters in Little Rock, Arkansas, greatly affected Hasan. Lee told Fox News that Hasan made "outlandish" statements against the American military presence in Iraq and Afghanistan, reportedly saying that "the Muslims should stand up and fight against the aggressor," referring to American soldiers. Hasan expressed hope U.S. President Barack Obama would withdraw troops. He was frequently agitated and argumentative with other Army personnel.

Despite these problems, Hasan was promoted from captain to major on May 17, 2009, while the Army's medical corps had chronic shortages of majors. In July 2009, he was transferred to Darnall Army Medical Center in Fort Hood, Texas, moving into the city of Killeen. Two weeks later, he lawfully purchased an FN Five-seven handgun. Prior to his transfer, Hasan had received a "poor performance" evaluation from supervisors and medical faculty. Despite concerns, his former boss, Lt. Col. Ben Phillips, graded his performance as "outstanding."

Hasan's cousin, Virginia attorney Nader Hasan, disputed the assertion that he was "disenchanted with the military," but said Hasan dreaded war after counseling soldiers with post-traumatic stress disorder. He was "mortified by the idea" of deploying after he heard on a "daily basis the horrors they saw over there." Nader also stated Hasan was harassed by his fellow soldiers. "He hired a military attorney to try to have the issue resolved, pay back the government, to get out of the military. He was at the end of trying everything."

Hasan's aunt also said Hasan sought discharge because of harassment relating to his Islamic faith. An Army spokesman did not confirm the relatives' statements, with the deputy director of the American Muslim Armed Forces and Veterans Affairs Council stating the reported harassment was "inconsistent" with their records.

Hasan's uncle Rafiq Hamad, a resident of Ramallah in the West Bank, characterized Hasan as gentle and quiet. He fainted while observing childbirth, hence his choice to focus on psychiatry. He was deeply sensitive and mourned a pet bird for months after it died. Also near Ramallah, cousin Mohammed Hasan said, "because he's Muslim, he didn't want to go to Afghanistan or Iraq, and he didn't want to expose himself to violence and death." Mohammed stated his cousin was a "pleasant young man" who was happy to graduate and to be joining the army after his uncle and cousins served. They never talked about politics, but Hasan complained "he was treated like a Muslim, like an Arab, rather than an American; he was discriminated against."

According to military records, Hasan was unmarried. However, David Cook, a former neighbor, stated, in 1997, Hasan had two sons living with him and attending local schools. Cook said, "As far as I know, he was a single father. I never saw a wife."

=== Military awards and decorations ===
Hasan received the Army Service Ribbon as a private in 1988 after completing Advanced Individual Training (AIT), the National Defense Service Medal twice for service during the time periods of the Persian Gulf War and the Global War on Terror, and the Global War on Terrorism Service Medal for support service during the Global War on Terror.

== Religious and ideological beliefs ==
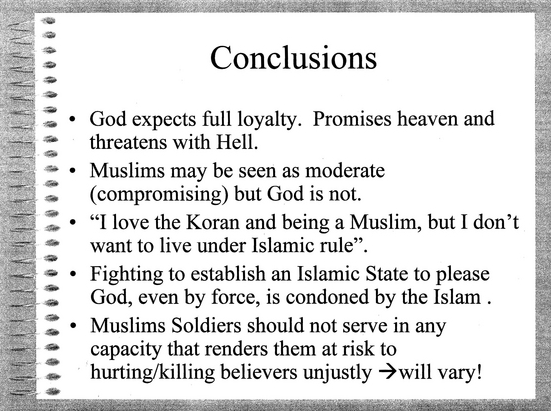
Slide 49/50 of The Quranic World View As It Relates to Muslims in the U.S. Military, a presentation made by Hasan during a symposium of U.S. Army physicians at WRAMC

According to one of his cousins, Hasan was Muslim. He became more devout after the early deaths of his parents. His cousin did not recall him expressing any radical or anti-American views, and his family also described Hasan as a peaceful person, and a good American. One of his cousins said Hasan turned against the wars after hearing the stories of soldiers he treated in therapy following their return from Afghanistan and Iraq. His aunt said he did not tell the family he was going to Afghanistan.

In May 2001, Hasan attended the Dar Al-Hijrah mosque in the Falls Church area for the funeral of his mother and occasionally, attended a mosque in Silver Spring, Maryland, close to where he lived and worked. He was well known by the Imam for over a decade. Faizul Khan, the former Imam of the Silver Spring mosque where Hasan prayed several times a week, said he was "a reserved guy with a nice personality. We discussed religious matters. Politics were never brought up. He is Muslim." Khan said Hasan often expressed his wish to get married, and the Imam said, "I got the impression he was a committed soldier."

Air Force Lt. Col. Dr. Val Finnell, a graduate school classmate in the Master's in Public Health program, said in a class on environmental health, Hasan's project dealt with "whether the Global War On Terror is a war on Islam" and the effect on Muslims in the military, which Finnell thought was strange.

According to Colonel Terry Lee, since retired, "He [Hasan] said 'maybe Muslims should stand up and fight against the aggressor'. At first, we thought he meant help the armed forces, but apparently that wasn't the case. Other times, he said we shouldn't be in the war in the first place."

=== Email exchanges with Anwar al-Awlaki ===
In 2001–02, Anwar al-Awlaki was the Imam of the Dar al-Hijrah mosque. During that time, he was considered a moderate Muslim. Serving as the Muslim chaplain at George Washington University, he was frequently invited to speak about Islam to audiences in Washington, DC, and to members of Congress and the government. Hasan reportedly had deep respect for al-Awlaki's teachings.

Eleven months prior to the shootings, in December 2008, federal intelligence officials captured a series of e-mail exchanges between Al-Awlaki and Hasan. During this period, al-Awlaki was deemed a "radical cleric." They determined the e-mails were religious, and did not contain any elements of militancy nor any concerning subject matter. Counter-terrorism specialists for the FBI reading the e-mails stated "they were consistent with authorized research Major Hasan was conducting." The e-mails contained general questions about spiritual guidance with regard to conflicts between Islam and military service, and officials judged them to be consistent with his legitimate mental health research about Muslims in the American armed services.

After the shootings, the Yemeni journalist Abdulelah Hider Shaea interviewed al-Awlaki in November 2009 about their exchanges, and discussed their time with a Washington Post reporter. According to Shaea, Al-Awlaki said he "neither ordered nor pressured ... Hasan to harm Americans." Al-Awlaki said Hasan first e-mailed him on December 17, 2008. By way of introduction, Hasan said: "Do you remember me? I used to pray with you at the Virginia mosque." According to Al-Awlaki, Hasan said he was Muslim around the time the Imam was preaching at Dar al-Hijrah in 2001 and 2002. This coincides with the death of his mother.

Al-Awlaki said, "Maybe Nidal was affected by one of my lectures." He added: "It was clear, from his e-mails, Nidal trusted me. Nidal told me: 'I speak with you about issues I never speak with anyone.'" Al-Awlaki said Hasan arrived at his conclusions regarding the acceptability of violence in Islam, and said he was not the one to initiate this. Shaea summarized their relationship by saying, "Nidal was providing evidence to Anwar, not vice versa."

In October 2008, Charles Allen, U.S. Undersecretary of Homeland Security for Intelligence and Analysis, warned that al-Awlaki "targets U.S. Muslims with radical online lectures encouraging terrorist attacks from his new home in Yemen."

Former CIA officer Bruce Riedel says "E-mailing a known al-Qaeda sympathizer should set-off alarm bells. Even if he was exchanging recipes, the bureau should have put out an alert."

Al-Awlaki had a website with a blog to share his views. On December 11, 2008, he condemned any Muslim who seeks a religious decree "that would allow him to serve in the armies of the dis-believers and fight against his brothers." The NEFA Foundation says, on December 23, 2008, six days after he said Hasan first e-mailed him, al-Awlaki wrote on his blog: "The bullets of the fighters of Afghanistan and Iraq are a reflection of the feelings of Muslims toward America."

An unidentified Muslim officer at Fort Hood said Hasan's eyes "lit up" while speaking about al-Awlaki's teachings. Some investigators believe Hasan's contacts with al-Awlaki pushed him toward violence at a time he was depressed and stressed.

== 2009 Fort Hood shooting ==
=== Prior activity and planning ===
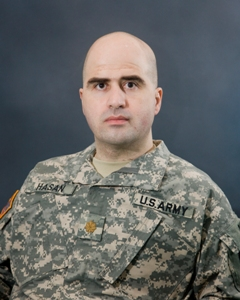
Hasan in 2009

The government agents monitoring Islamic websites believe Hasan, using the screenname 'NidalHasan', posted about suicide bombings in May 2009, although, during this period, government agents did not link the posts to Hasan. The postings by 'NidalHasan' likened a suicide bomber to a soldier falling on a grenade to save his colleagues, to sacrifice for a "noble cause." ABC News reported after the fact, anonymous government agents issued a press-release claiming they were allegedly aware Hasan attempted to contact Al Qaeda, then issued a press-release claiming Hasan had "more unexplained connections to people tracked by the FBI" than just Anwar al-Awlaki.

Hasan's business card left in his apartment describes him as a psychiatrist specializing in Behavioral Health – Mental Health – Life Skills, and contains the acronyms SoA (SWT). According to investigators, the acronym "SoA" is used on jihadist websites as an acronym for "Soldier of Allah" or "Servant of Allah." SWT is commonly used to mean "subhanahu wa ta'ala" a prayer uttered after mentioning Allah. A review of Hasan's computer and email accounts show visits to internet sites espousing radical Islamist ideas, according to a press-release from an anonymous government agent.

Hasan expressed concern about the former actions by some of the soldiers he evaluated as a psychiatrist. Days before his attacks on Fort Hood in 2009, Hasan asked his supervisors and Army legal advisers how to handle reports of soldiers' deeds in Afghanistan and Iraq that disturbed him.

Hasan was to be deployed to Afghanistan on November 28, 2009. Hasan told a local store owner he was stressed about his imminent deployment to Afghanistan, since he might be required to fight or kill fellow Muslims. In a press release from Jeff Sadoski, spokesman for U.S. senator Kay Bailey Hutchison, "Hasan was upset about his deployment."

Hasan gave away furniture from his home on the morning of the shooting, saying he was going to be deployed on Friday. He also distributed copies of the Quran. Kamran Pasha wrote about a Muslim officer at Fort Hood who said he prayed with Hasan on the day of the Fort Hood shooting, and Hasan "appeared relaxed and not in any way troubled or nervous." This officer believed the shootings could possibly be motivated by religious radicalism.

=== Shooting ===
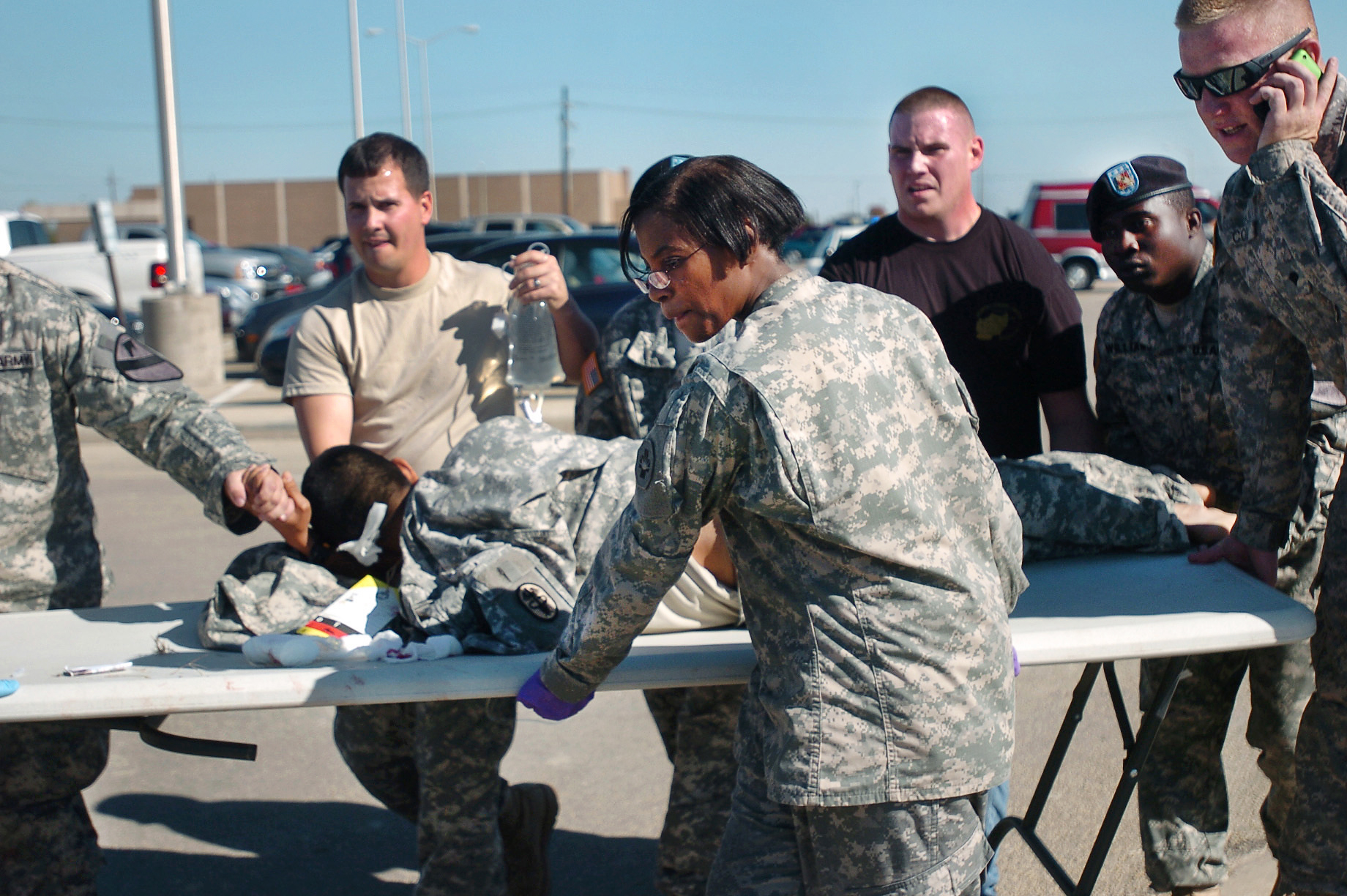
First responders transport a soldier wounded in the Fort Hood shooting.

On November 5, 2009, Hasan shouted "Allahu Akbar!" (meaning "God is great" in Arabic), and opened fire on unarmed people in the Soldier Readiness Center of Fort Hood, located in Killeen, Texas, murdering 13 fellow soldiers (ten men and three women, one of whom was pregnant), and wounding over thirty others. The attack was the worst shooting against armed forces on an American military base.

Department of the Army police officer Kimberly D. Munley encountered Hasan, who was leaving the building. Munley and Hasan exchanged shots before Munley was shot in the leg twice. Department of the Army police officer Mark Todd shot Hasan several times. Todd kicked the pistol out of Hasan's hand, then cuffed him. The attack lasted about ten minutes.

==== Hospitalization ====
Hasan was hospitalized in the intensive care unit at Brooke Army Medical Center at Fort Sam Houston in San Antonio, Texas. His condition was described as "stable." News reports on November 7, 2009, indicated he was in a coma. On November 9, hospital spokesperson Dewey Mitchell announced Hasan regained consciousness and was able to talk since he was removed from a ventilator on November 7.

On November 13, Hasan's attorney, John Galligan, announced Hasan was paralyzed from the waist down from the bullet wounds to his spine and would likely never walk again. He has used a wheelchair ever since. In mid-December, Galligan indicated Hasan was moved from intensive care to a private hospital room. Galligan said doctors indicated Hasan would need at least two months in the hospital to learn "to care for himself."

== Legal proceedings ==
On November 7, 2009, while Hasan was communicative, he refused to talk to law enforcement officials. On November 12 and December 2, respectively, Hasan was charged with thirteen counts of premeditated murder and thirty-two counts of attempted murder under the Uniform Code of Military Justice, thus making him eligible for the death penalty.

At the time, authorities did not specify if they would seek the death penalty; Colonel Michael Mulligan would serve as the Army's lead prosecutor. Mulligan was lead prosecutor on the Hasan Akbar case, in which a soldier was sentenced to death for the murder of two members of the U.S. military.

John P. Galligan, a retired Army JAG colonel, represented Hasan. On November 21, in a hearing held in Hasan's hospital room, a military magistrate ruled there was probable cause Hasan committed the shooting spree at Fort Hood and ordered pretrial confinement until his court-martial. Hasan remained in intensive care in accordance with the magistrate's dictate. On November 23, Galligan said Hasan would likely plead not guilty to the charges against him and may use an insanity defense at his court-martial.

In a press release, Army public affairs staff stated doctors would evaluate Hasan by mid-January 2010 to determine his competency to stand trial as well as his mental state at the time of the attacks, but delayed the exam on request from Galligan until after the Article 32 hearing. The Army dictated Hasan speak only in English on the phone or with visitors unless an interpreter was present. Hasan was moved from Brooke Army Medical Center to the Bell County Jail in Belton, Texas, on April 9, 2010. Fort Hood negotiated a renewable $207,000 contract with Bell County in March to house Hasan for six months.

In a press release, Galligan announced prosecutors would seek the death penalty, stating, "It is the first 'formal notice' but, of course, it is a virtual given from the start. In short, the Army has been pursuing death from the git-go." The prosecutors filed a memo on April 28, 2010, stating the aggravating factor necessary for pursuit of the death penalty will be satisfied if Hasan is found guilty of more than one murder. The decision to seek the death penalty followed the Article 32 hearing. In a September 15, 2010, press release, Hasan's attorney stated he intended to seek closed court hearings.

On October 12, 2010, Hasan was due to appear for his first broad military hearing into the attack. The hearing, formally called an Article 32 proceeding, akin to a grand jury hearing but open to the public, was expected to span six weeks. The hearing, designed to help the top Army commander at Fort Hood determine whether there was enough evidence to court-martial Hasan, was scheduled to begin calling witnesses but was delayed by technicality disputes. The hearing proceeded on October 14 with witness testimonies from survivors of the attacks. On November 15, the military hearing ended after Galligan declined to offer a defense case, on the grounds the White House and Defense Department refused to release documents he requested pertaining to an intelligence review of the shootings. Neither the defense nor prosecution offered to deliver a closing argument.

On November 18, Colonel James L. Pohl, investigating officer for the Article 32 hearing, recommended Hasan be court-martialed and face the death penalty. His recommendation was forwarded to another U.S. Army colonel at Fort Hood, who, after filing his report, presented his recommendation to the post commander. The post commander decided Hasan would face a trial and the death penalty. On July 6, 2011, the Fort Hood post commander referred the case to a general court-martial authorized to consider the death penalty.

On July 27, 2011, Fort Hood Chief Circuit Judge Colonel Gregory Gross set a March 5, 2012, trial date. Hasan, who had stopped shaving following the attacks by citing his religious beliefs, declined to enter any plea, and Judge Gross granted a request by Hasan's attorneys to defer the plea. Hasan notified Gross he had released John Galligan, his civilian attorney during previous court appearances, choosing to be represented by three military lawyers.

On February 2, 2012, a military judge delayed the trial until June 12, 2012. Lieutenant Colonel Kris Poppe, Hasan's lead attorney, said the request to delay the trial was "purely a matter of necessity of adequate time for pretrial preparation."

On April 10, 2012, Hasan's lawyers requested another continuance to move the trial start date from June to late October to investigate paperwork and evidence and interview witnesses. Gross agreed to take the request under advisement. Judge Gross denied a defense motion seeking a Defense Initiated Victim Outreach specialist to testify, Fort Hood officials said. The new program is intended to help the defense respond to the needs of survivors and victims' families, and possibly change their attitudes if they support the death penalty. Gross also denied a defense request to force prosecutors to provide notes from meetings and conversations with President Barack Obama, the defense secretary, and other government agents after the November 5, 2009, attacks. Defense attorneys argued they want to determine if anything unlawfully influenced Hasan's chain of command to prosecute him. On April 18, 2012, Judge Gross granted in part the defense motion for a continuance, scheduling the trial for August 20, 2012.

In July 2012, after directing Hasan to shave his beard, the judge found Hasan in contempt of court and fined him. He was fined once more for retaining his beard, and was warned by Judge Colonel Gregory Gross he could be force-shaved prior to his court-martial. On August 15, Hasan was scheduled to enter pleas to the charges brought against him before the beginning of the court-martial; he would not be allowed to plead guilty for the premeditated murder charges because prosecutors pursued the death penalty.

The court-martial was delayed by Hasan's objections to being shaved against his will, and his appeal to the United States Court of Appeals for the Armed Forces regarding the matter; through his attorneys, Hasan claimed his beard is part of his religious beliefs. The prosecutors argued Hasan was simply trying to delay his trial.

On August 27, the Appeals Court announced the trial could continue, but did not rule whether Hasan could be force-shaved nor did they set a new date for the start of the trial. The Appeals Court rejected attempts by Hasan to receive "religious accommodation" to grow a beard. On September 6, Colonel Gross ruled Hasan be force-shaved after he determined the 1993 Religious Freedom Restoration Act did not apply to this case; however, the force-shave will not be enforced until Hasan's appeals are exhausted. During the September 6 hearing, Hasan twice offered to plead guilty; however, U.S. Army rules prohibit judges from accepting a guilty plea in a death penalty case.

Hasan remained incarcerated and in a wheelchair. He continued to receive paychecks.

On June 3, 2013, a military judge allowed Hasan to represent himself. His attorneys were to remain on the case, but only if he asked for their help. Jury selection was set to start on June 5, and opening arguments were scheduled to begin on July 1. On June 14, 2013, U.S. Army Colonel Tara Osborn dictated Hasan could not claim he was defending the Taliban. In a press-release, Hasan justified his actions during the Fort Hood attacks by claiming the U.S. military was at war against Islam.

During the first day of the trial on August 6, Hasan, representing himself, admitted he was the attacker during the Fort Hood attacks in 2009, and stated the evidence would show he was the attacker. He also told the panel hearing he "switched sides", and regarded himself as a Mujahideen waging "jihad"—waging war—against the U.S. military. By August 7, disagreements between Hasan and his stand-by defense team led Judge Osborn to suspend the trial. Hasan's defense attorneys were concerned Hasan was trying to help prosecutors achieve a death sentence. Because the prosecutors sought the death penalty, his defense team sought to prevent this.

On August 8, Judge Osborn ruled Hasan could continue to represent himself during the trial, then rejected his stand-by defense team's requests they take over Hasan's defense or have their roles reduced. The judge also declined the defense lawyers' request they be removed from the case. On August 9, Hasan allowed two of his three stand-by defense lawyers—Lieutenant Colonel Christopher Martin and Major Joseph Marcee—to seek leave to prepare an appeal arguing the defendant was seeking the death penalty, thus undermining their rules of "professional conduct."

His third attorney, Lieutenant Colonel Kris Poppe, remained behind to observe the court proceedings. Court proceedings also resumed with the prosecution presenting testimonies from several survivors of the Fort Hood attacks. By August 14, more than sixty prosecution witnesses had testified, and each identified Hasan as the attacker. Court proceedings were speedy because Hasan raised few objections and declined to cross-examine most witnesses.

By August 13, prosecutors shifted to presenting forensic evidence with FBI agents present at the crime scene testifying they had so much evidence at the crime scene, they ran out of markers. This evidence included one hundred forty-six cartridge cases and six magazines. The New York Times published remarks by Hasan from a mental health report supplied by the defendant's civil attorney John Galligan. According to these documents, Hasan told mental health professionals he "would still be a martyr" if he was convicted and executed. Hasan, acting as his defense lawyer, offered to share the report with prosecutors during his court-martial. On August 14, Judge Osborn blocked prosecutors from seeing the report. On August 19, she also excluded prosecuting evidence relating to Hasan's early radicalization, plus evidence which presented the Fort Hood attacks as a "copycat" based on the actions of Hasan Akbar, another U.S. Army soldier who was sentenced to death.

On August 20, 2013, prosecutors rested their case against Hasan. They called nearly ninety witnesses over eleven days with the fast pace of proceedings attributed to Hasan's refusal to cross-examine most witnesses. Throughout the proceedings, he only questioned three witnesses. While the defense was scheduled to present his case on Wednesday, Hasan indicated he had no plans to call any defense witnesses. Earlier, he planned to call two defense witnesses: one a mitigation expert in capital murder cases, and the other a California university professor specializing in philosophy and religion. Hasan also formally declined to argue prosecutors failed to prove their case. Hasan did not call any witnesses or testify in his defense; he rested his defense on August 21, 2013. On August 22, 2013, Hasan declined to give a closing argument.

=== Verdict and sentencing ===
On August 23, 2013, the military jury consisting of nine colonels, three lieutenant colonels, and one major convicted Hasan of all charges, making him eligible for the death penalty. Those deliberations began on August 26, 2013. By August 27, the thirteen-member panel of jurors heard testimony from twenty-four victims and family members of those wounded and killed during the 2009 Fort Hood attacks against American armed forces.

Throughout the proceedings, Hasan declined to speak in his defense or question any of the witnesses. He also did not provide any material explaining his decision to not mount a defense throughout the trial and sentencing. At the end, Hasan, acting as his attorney, told jurors the defense rested his case. Judge Tara Osborn accepted Hasan's decision. In his final statement, lead prosecutor Colonel Mike Mulligan said

[Hasan] can never be a martyr because he has nothing to give ... Do not be misled; do not be confused; do not be fooled. He is not giving his life. We are taking his life. This is not his gift to God, it's his debt to society. He will not now and will not ever be a martyr.

The jurors re-convened to decide sentencing. On August 28, 2013, the jurors recommended Hasan be sentenced to death. The panel also recommended Hasan forfeit his military pay and be dismissed from the Army, a separation for officers carrying the same consequences as a dishonorable discharge. Due to mandatory appeals and the military's historical reluctance to execute convicts, USA Today noted in 2019 that an execution would still be years away.

== Scheduled execution ==
=== Prior proceedings ===
Following his conviction and sentencing, Nidal Hasan was incarcerated at the United States Disciplinary Barracks at Fort Leavenworth in Kansas to await execution. According to Chris Haug, Fort Hood's Chief of Media Relations, Hasan was stripped of his rank and dismissed from the U.S. Army. Hasan would be referred to as "Inmate Nidal Hasan." On September 5, 2013, prison staff force-shaved Hasan. Fort Leavenworth authorities justified their decision by citing Hasan would be subject to Army regulations although he was dismissed from the Army and forfeited all pay and allowances. Despite Army regulations banning personnel from facial hair, Hasan stopped shaving following the Fort Hood attacks in 2009 by citing his religious beliefs.

Although no new photos of Hasan have been released since his incarceration, military authorities confirmed that a video recording of the force-shaving exists, as per military regulations. In response, John Galligan, Hasan's former civilian lawyer, planned to sue the military for having violated his religious beliefs. Galligan argued a military council in 2012 allowed Hasan to keep his beard for the duration of the trial, and dismissed the Army's actions as vindictive.

On August 28, 2014, Hasan's attorney said Hasan wrote to Abu Bakr al-Baghdadi, then head of the Islamic State of Iraq and the Levant (ISIL). In the letter, Hasan requested to be made a citizen of the Islamic State, and included his signature and the abbreviation SoA (Soldier of Allah).

In January 2015, it was reported that despite the lengthy appeals process, Hasan was "eager to follow his path to martyrdom" as soon as possible.

On December 7, 2020, the United States Army Court of Criminal Appeals upheld Hasan's death penalty. On September 11, 2023, the United States Court of Appeals for the Armed Forces upheld Hasan's death penalty. On March 31, 2025, the United States Supreme Court denied Hasan's final petition for a writ of certiorari, thereby confirming his death sentence. On September 24, 2025, Secretary of Defense Pete Hegseth announced that he was seeking formal approval for Hasan's execution from president Donald Trump.

=== Approval and livestream controversy ===
On October 5, 2026, the U.S. Department of Defense, via Pentagon spokesperson Sean Parnell, issued a statement saying that Hegseth had recommended, and President Trump approved, execution by U.S. Army firing squad. Army planners were reportedly unaware of this decision until it was publicly reported. On October 6, the acting Secretary of the Army Adam Telle decided that Hasan's execution by firing squad will take place at Fort Hood, Texas, on December 3, 2026, at 1 p.m. CT.

On October 8, Hegseth stated that Hasan's execution would be a public execution, and the Pentagon stated that it would be livestreamed. This also reportedly came as a surprise to army planners. Were it to be made public, it would be the first public execution in the United States in 90 years.

The announcement that the execution would be livestreamed received widespread bipartisan backlash from lawmakers, religious leaders, and international observers. CBS News reported that only Afghanistan and Iran had public executions in the 2020s, according to Amnesty International. Hegseth argues that his execution will serve as justice and a warning to those who would commit similar crimes, while foreign affairs and counterterrorism experts warn his livestreamed execution will make him a martyr and be used for recruitment purposes. Secretary of Homeland Security Markwayne Mullin supported Secretary Hegseth's decision to livestream Nidal Hasan's execution and played down concerns that images of the execution could be used as propaganda for extremist groups. On October 15, President Trump announced his decision that the execution would not be livestreamed. However, survivors and family members of Hasan's victims will still be able to watch the execution in person.

== Reactions ==
=== Retrospective analyses ===
Hasan's perceived beliefs were a cause for concern among some of his peers. According to an anonymous source, Hasan was disciplined for "proselytizing about his Muslim faith with patients and colleagues" while at Uniformed Services University of the Health Sciences (USUHS). The Telegraph reported an incident in which some attendees felt that one of his lectures, expected to be of a medical nature, became a diatribe against "infidels". Air Force doctor Val Finnell, a former medical school classmate, complained to superiors about Hasan's "anti-American rants." Finnell said: "The system is not doing what it's supposed to do. He at least should have been confronted about these beliefs, told to cease and desist, and to shape up or ship out."

Jarret Brachman, a scholar of terrorism, said Hasan's contacts with al-Awlaki raised "huge red flags." According to Brachman, al-Awlaki is a major influence internationally on English-speaking jihadists.

The Dallas Morning News reported on November 17 that law enforcement officials suspected the attacks were triggered by the refusal of Hasan's superiors to process his requests seeking to have some of his patients prosecuted for war crimes based on statements they made during psychiatric sessions with him. Dallas attorney Patrick McLain, a former Marine, opined that Hasan was lawfully justified in sharing privileged information from his patients, but it was impossible to be sure without knowing that information. Some fellow psychiatrists complained to superiors Hasan's requests violated physician–patient privilege.

Shortly after the attacks, General George Casey, Chief of Staff of the Army, controversially said the "real tragedy" would be harming the cause of diversity, saying, "As great a tragedy as this was, it would be a shame if our diversity became a casualty as well." Several months later, in a February 2010 interview, Casey said, "Our diversity—not only in our Army, but in our country, is a strength. And as horrific as this tragedy was, if our diversity becomes a casualty, I think that's worse."

FBI director Robert Mueller appointed William Webster, a former director of the FBI, to conduct an independent review of the bureau's handling of investigations related to Hasan and whether they missed indicators of an attack. Webster was selected for the job due to, as Mueller stated, being "uniquely qualified" for such a review, and the Webster Commission's press-release includes several recommendations including written policies to "[...] clarify the ownership of leads, integration of databases, and acquiring search capabilities for all relevant databases based on computational analysis of textual data to replace simple keyword searches [...]."

=== Media analysis and political statements ===
On the November 9, 2009, Fox News Sunday show, U.S. senator Joe Lieberman called for a probe by his Senate Committee on Homeland Security and Governmental Affairs. In his press-release, Lieberman said,

[I]f the reports we're receiving of various statements he made, acts he took, are valid, he turned to Islamist extremism [...] if that is true, the murder of these thirteen people was a terrorist act [...] I think it's very important to let the Army and the FBI go forward with this investigation before we reach any conclusions.

The November 23 cover of the European and U.S. editions of Time magazine featured a photograph of Hasan, with the title "Terrorist?" over his eyes. Nancy Gibbs reported the cover story: "Hasan matched the classic model of the lone, strange, crazy killer: the quiet and gentle man who formed few close human attachments." She noted, "Hasan's motives were mixed enough that everyone with an agenda could find markers in the trail he left." Bruce Hoffman, a terrorism scholar and Georgetown University professor, told Gibbs "I used to argue it was only terrorism if it were part of some identifiable organized conspiracy [...] the nature of terrorism is changing, and Major Hasan may be an example of that." The Christian Science Monitor also questioned whether Hasan was a terrorist.

On November 14, The New York Times stated, "Major Hasan may be the latest example of an increasingly common type of terrorist, self-radicalized with the help of the Internet, and wreaks havoc without support from overseas networks and without having to cross a border to reach his target."

== See also ==
- Capital punishment by the United States military
- Fragging – Deliberate killing or attempted killing of a soldier by a fellow soldier
- List of people scheduled to be executed in the United States
- List of death row inmates in the United States § Military
- Jihobbyist
- List of mass shootings in the United States
