= Michael Mulligan =

American military prosecutor

- Born: Niagara Falls, New York
- Allegiance: United States
- Branch: Army
- Service years: 1989–2016
- Rank: Colonel

Colonel Michael Mulligan is a retired prosecutor in the United States Army notable for serving as the lead prosecutor in the courts-martial of Hasan Akbar and of Nidal Malik Hasan, the sole accused in the November 2009 Fort Hood shooting.

== Early life ==
The son of a trucking company manager, Michael Mulligan was born in Niagara Falls, New York and grew up in Niagara Falls, Ontario. He enjoyed playing hockey, and played as a left winger in college at SUNY Oswego. After graduating, he played professionally in Germany from 1981 to 1983. He subsequently returned to the United States and attended the University of Tulsa College of Law, graduating in 1988. He worked briefly as an assistant district attorney in Tulsa County before joining the United States Army.

== Career ==
In the Army, Mulligan returned to Germany, where he worked as a deputy and staff judge advocate. After returning to the United States, he served as head of the Criminal Law Division at Fort Hood.

As a military prosecutor, Mulligan led the 2005 court-martial of Hasan Akbar, a soldier ultimately convicted of murdering two of his fellow soldiers at the beginning of the 2003 invasion of Iraq. He was also appointed lead prosecutor in the court-martial of Nidal Malik Hasan, the sole accused in the November 2009 Fort Hood shooting.
