= Baghran District =

Baghran د بغران ولسوالۍ
- district
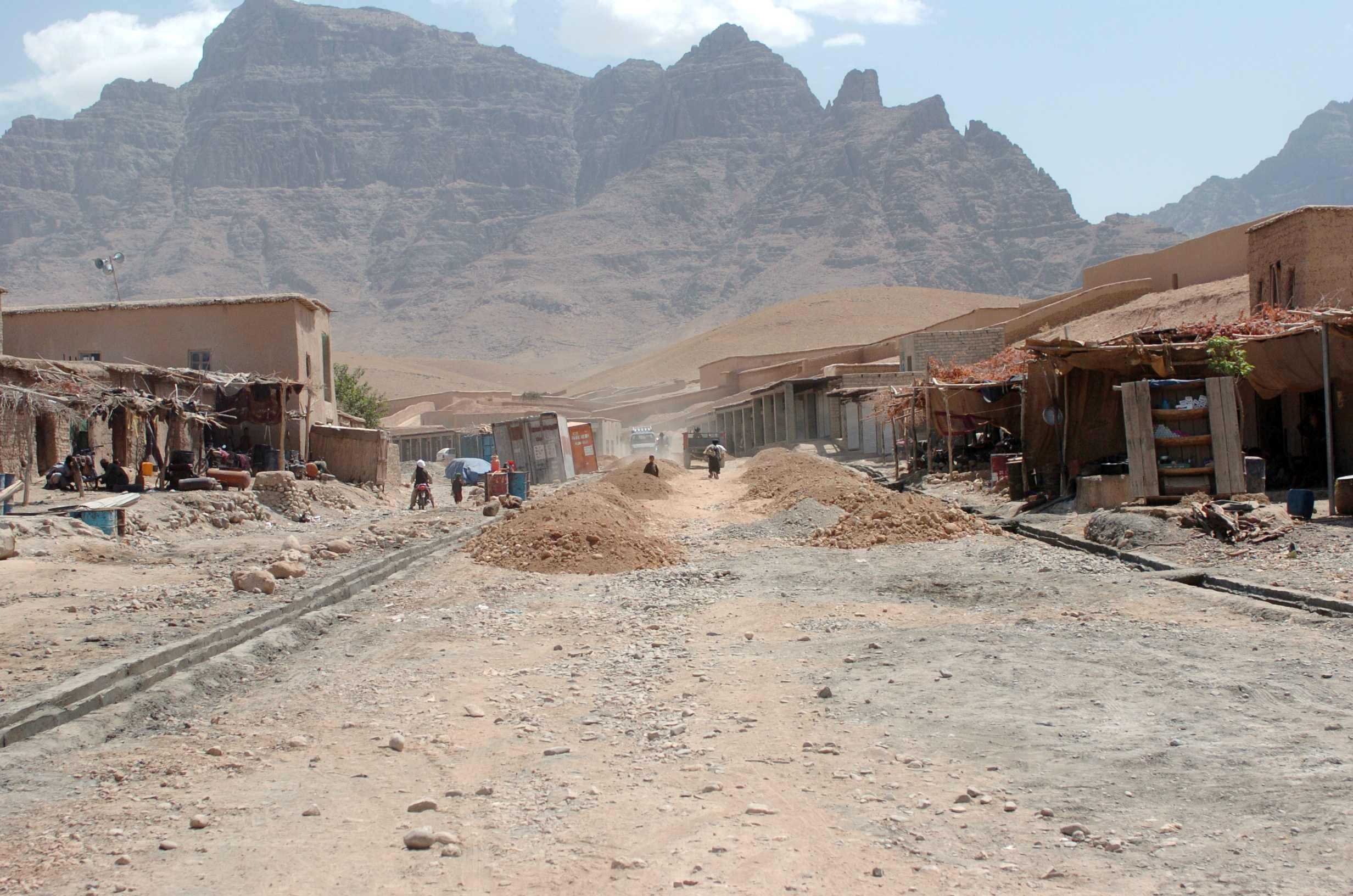
- The main street in Baghran's district centre is being resurfaced as part of a foreign reconstruction project.

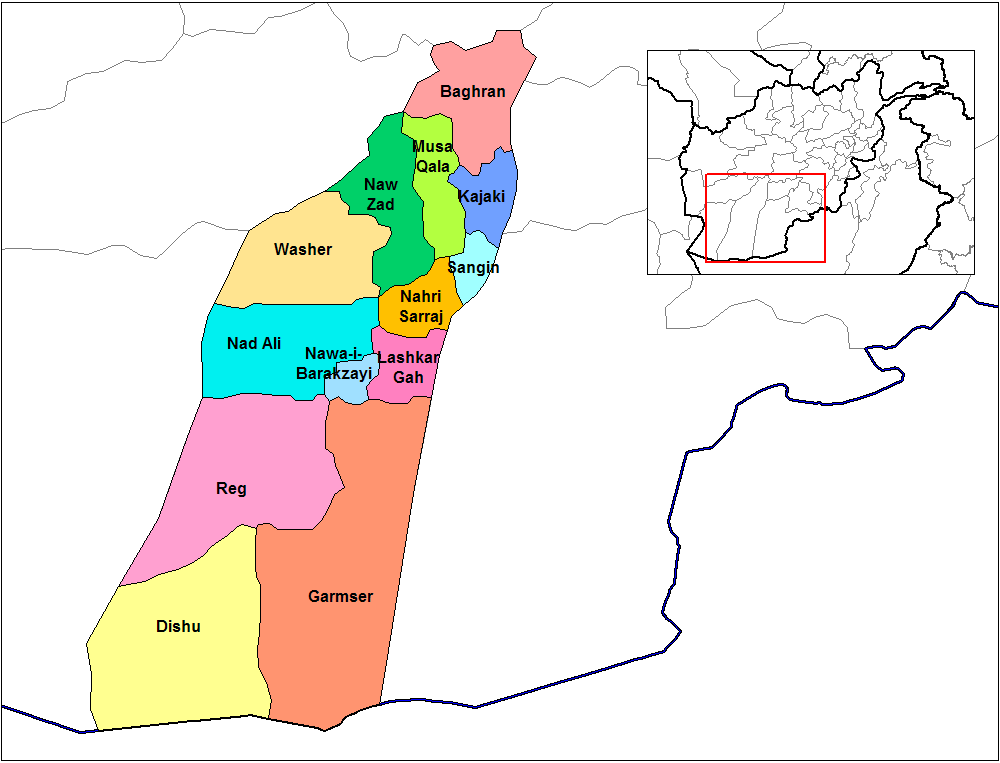
- Baghran is the northernmost district in Helmand Province.
- Coordinates: 33.014167°N 65.041944°E
- Country: Afghanistan
- Province: Helmand

Population
  - Estimate (2002): 82,018

Baghrān (Pashto: بغران) is the northernmost district in Helmand Province, Afghanistan. Its population, which is 90% Pashtun and 10% Hazara, was estimated at 82,018 in 2002. The district centre is the village of Baghran; there are around 450 villages in the district.

Dominated by the Baghran Valley, a traditional stronghold of traditionalist Afghan Pashtun tribal power, Baghran saw significant military clashes during the Russian occupation. Rais-al-Baghrani, a former Taliban leader, recently agreed to cooperate with the Government of Afghanistan and the Coalition forces, under the Programme Takm-e-sol (Reconciliation and Forgiveness). Baghran district's primary produce (after opium poppies) is wheat.
