= John R. Vines =

United States Army general (born 1949)

John Randolph Vines
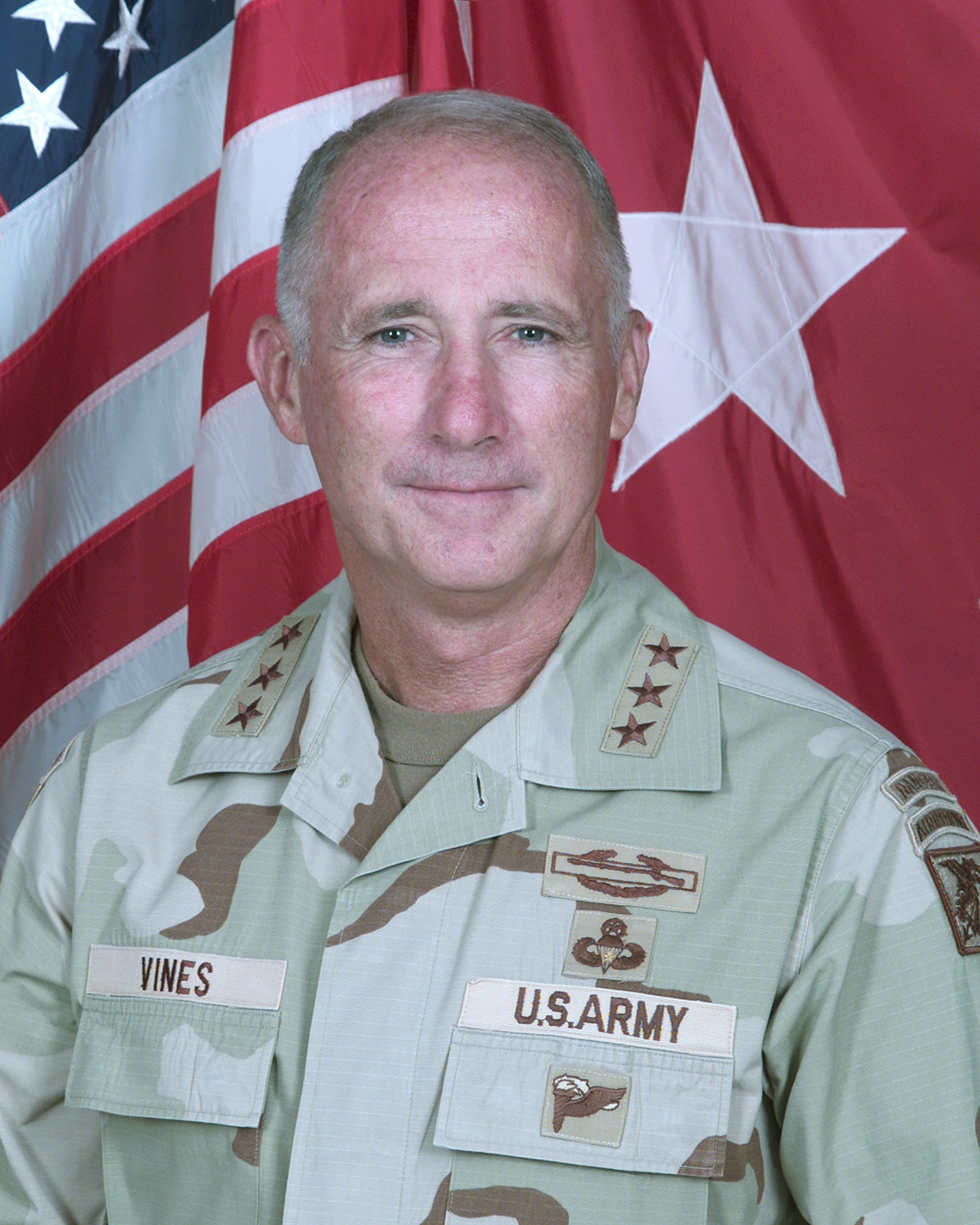
- Official portrait of LTG John R. Vines.
- Born: June 2, 1949 (age 77)
- Military career
- Allegiance: United States of America
- Branch: United States Army
- Service years: 1971 - 2007
- Rank: Lieutenant General
- Commands: XVIII Airborne Corps; Multi-National Corps – Iraq
- Conflicts: Iraq War; Operation Enduring Freedom; Operation Desert Shield/Storm; Operation Just Cause
- Awards: Defense Distinguished Service Medal; Distinguished Service Medal; Defense Superior Service Medal; Legion of Merit

Lieutenant General John Randolph Vines (born June 2, 1949) is an American former commander of the U.S. Army's XVIII Airborne Corps and Multi-National Corps – Iraq.

Vines previously commanded the 82nd Airborne Division during the U.S. deployment to Afghanistan. He was responsible for tactical combat missions. Subsequently, Vines replaced Lt. Gen. Dan K. McNeill as the commanding general of U.S. and coalition forces in Afghanistan.

== Career ==
Vines received his BSc degree in chemistry from the University of Alabama and his MA degree in national security and strategy from the Naval War College.

He was commissioned a Second Lieutenant of Infantry in 1971 through the ROTC program at the University of Alabama.

His previous assignments include the 3rd Infantry Division; U.S. Army Europe and Seventh U.S. Army; Ranger Department, US Army Infantry Center; Company Commander and S3 in the 1st Ranger Battalion, 75th Ranger Regiment; and the original Executive Officer of the 3rd Ranger Battalion, 75th Ranger Regiment at its activation from 1984 until 1987.

As Lieutenant General, Vines has served in several command and staff assignments within the XVIII Airborne Corps to include joint duty with the Joint Special Operations Command. He served as Commander, 4th Battalion, 325th Airborne Infantry Regiment, during its combat parachute assault in Operation Just Cause and later when the unit was deployed as the first ground combat unit in Operation Desert Shield.

His second tour of joint duty with the Joint Special Operations Command included operations in Somalia; Commander, 2d Brigade, 101st Airborne Division (Air Assault); Assistant Division Commander for Operations, 82d Airborne Division; Chief of Staff, XVIII Airborne Corps and Fort Bragg; Chief of Office of Military Cooperation, Cairo, Egypt; Commander, 82d Airborne Division from August 2000 until October 2002; Commander, Coalition Task Force 82, in Afghanistan from 1 September 2002 until 1 May 2003; and then Commander, Combined Joint Task Force 180, Bagram, Afghanistan, until October 2003; Commander, Multi-National Corps – Iraq in Baghdad from January 2005 until January 2006.

After retirement, Vines spent a few months on the board of USFalcon, an information technology and systems engineering firm specializing in defense. He had consulted for the Department of Defense, but does not now have any industry ties. "One of the reasons I chose not to do that is that I felt like I would be taking advantage of a revolving door," he said. "There is a lot of hypocrisy there."

== Decorations and badges ==
- Defense Distinguished Service Medal (with Oak Leaf Cluster)
- Distinguished Service Medal (with Oak Leaf Cluster)
- Defense Superior Service Medal
- Legion of Merit (with Oak Leaf Cluster)
- Bronze Star (with Oak Leaf Cluster)
- Defense Meritorious Service Medal
- Meritorious Service Medal (with 2 Oak Leaf Clusters)
- Joint Service Commendation Medal
- Army Commendation Medal (with Oak Leaf Cluster)
- Joint Service Achievement Medal
- Army Achievement Medal
- Combat Infantryman Badge
- Expert Infantryman Badge
- Master Parachutist Badge (with Combat Star)
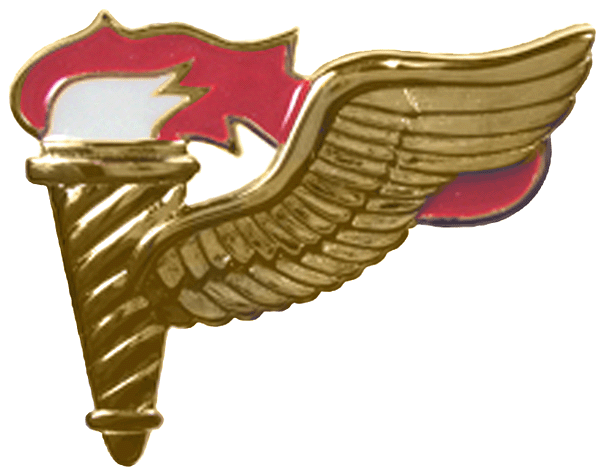
- Pathfinder Badge
- Air Assault Badge
- Ranger Tab

== See also ==
- Deaths of Phillip Esposito and Louis Allen
