= Jarret Brachman =

American terrorism expert

- Education: Augustana College (BA, 2000); University of Delaware (MA, 2002; PhD, 2006)
- Occupations: Author, consultant, scholar, and on the faculty of North Dakota State University
- Writing career
- Subject: Terrorism
- Notable work: Global Jihadism: Theory and Practice
- Website: jarretbrachman.net

Jarret Brachman is an American terrorism expert, the author of Global Jihadism: Theory and Practice and a consultant to several government agencies about terrorism.

== Education and career ==
Brachman graduated from Augustana College (BA, 2000) and University of Delaware (MA, 2002; PhD, 2006).

He is a former graduate fellow at the Central Intelligence Agency (2003), and the former director of research at West Point's Combating Terrorism Center (2004–08).

Brachman, now managing director of Cronus Global LLC and a civilian scholar on the faculty of North Dakota State University, regularly briefs government officials on terrorism issues.

In 2013, Brachman joined Wells Fargo's Emergency Incident Management Team.

== "Jihobbyist" ==
Brachman coined the phrase "jihobbyist" (portmanteau of jihad and hobbyist) in his 2008 book Global Jihadism: Theory and Practice. He explains in his introduction to the book that he coined the new term to describe people who, without the support of al-Qaeda or other jihadist organizations, come of their own accord to support the aims of those groups. It is used to denote a person who is not an active member of a violent jihadi organization such as Al-Qaeda or the Somali Al Shabaab, but who has a fascination with and enthusiasm for jihad and Islamic extremism.

Jihobbyists "are fans in the same way other people might follow football teams. But their sport is Al-Qaeda," he explained in an interview after the 2009 Fort Hood shooting by Nidal Malik Hasan, a Muslim American soldier who showed an interest in jihadist websites and views in the months prior to the shooting. In his book, Brachman says a jihobbyist "may be an enthusiast of the global Jihadist movement, someone who enjoys thinking about and watching the activities of the groups from the first and second tiers but generally they have no connection to al-Qaida or any other formal Jihadist groups." Colleen LaRose, who was investigated for terrorism and was known by the online moniker "Jihad Jane" is one example of a jihobbyist.

Aaron Weisburd, who founded Internet Haganah, criticized the term, writing: "The problem is that the term jihobbyist conveys the notion that these guys are not serious, that they do not constitute a threat. In fact what these guys are doing is marking time while waiting for the opportunities and associations to appear that will allow them to become real jihadis." Brachman responded by saying, in part, "[The term jihobbyist is] potentially useful in that it introduces shades of grey into the discussion: it acknowledges that people can support al-Qaida and wish death upon Americans, without ever 'joining up' officially", and that "The term, 'Jihobbyism,' also runs the risk of creating a false dichotomy between those who 'do' and those who 'talk.' The premise is flawed because 'talking' is a form of 'doing.' It may be less immediate in its consequences, but as we've learned, talking can actually be more dangerous than blowing stuff up: talking can serve as a force multiplier".

== Works ==
- Stealing Al-Qa'ida's playbook, Jarret M. Brachman, William F. McCants, Combating Terrorism Center, U.S. Military Academy, 2006
- Militant ideology atlas: research compendium, William McCants, Jarret Brachman, United States Military Academy, Combating Terrorism Center, 2006
- Terrorism and the American experience: constructing, contesting and countering terrorism since 1793, Jarret M. Brachman, University of Delaware, 2007
- Global jihadism: theory and practice, Jarret Brachman, Taylor & Francis, 2008, ISBN 0-415-45241-4, ISBN 978-0-415-45241-0
- Jarret Brachman (2009-09-10). "The Next Osama; On the eighth anniversary of 9/11, it's time to finally confront al Qaeda's scary move toward modernization – and the charismatic sheikh who is leading the way". Foreign Policy.
- Jarret Brachman (2012-06-08). "A unifying force lost". Foreign Policy. Archived from the original on 2012-06-13.

== See also ==
- Gamification
- Jihobbyist
