= David Barno =

United States Army general (born 1954)

David W. Barno
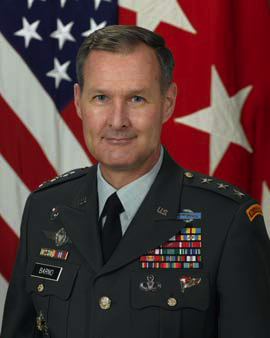
- Born: July 5, 1954 (age 72); Endicott, New York, U.S.
- Military career
- Allegiance: United States of America
- Branch: United States Army
- Service years: 1976–2006
- Rank: Lieutenant General
- Conflicts: Operation Urgent Fury; Operation Just Cause; Operation Enduring Freedom
- Awards: Distinguished Service Medal; Defense Superior Service Medal; Legion of Merit (2); Bronze Star Medal

David William Barno (born July 5, 1954) is a retired lieutenant general of the United States Army. He was commander of Combined Forces Command-Afghanistan from 2003 to 2005.

== Early life ==
Barno is a native of Endicott, New York. He is a graduate of Union Endicott High School Class of 1972.

== Education ==
Barno's military education includes the United States Military Academy (USMA) at West Point, New York (Class of 1976); Infantry Officer Basic and Advanced courses, Command and General Staff College, and the U.S. Army War College.

In his civilian studies, he earned a Master of Arts degree in National Security and Strategic Studies at Georgetown University. He also is a graduate of the Syracuse University Maxwell School National Security Management Course in 2002.

== Service career ==
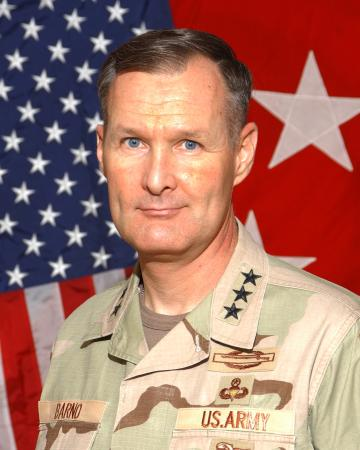
Lieutenant General David W. Barno

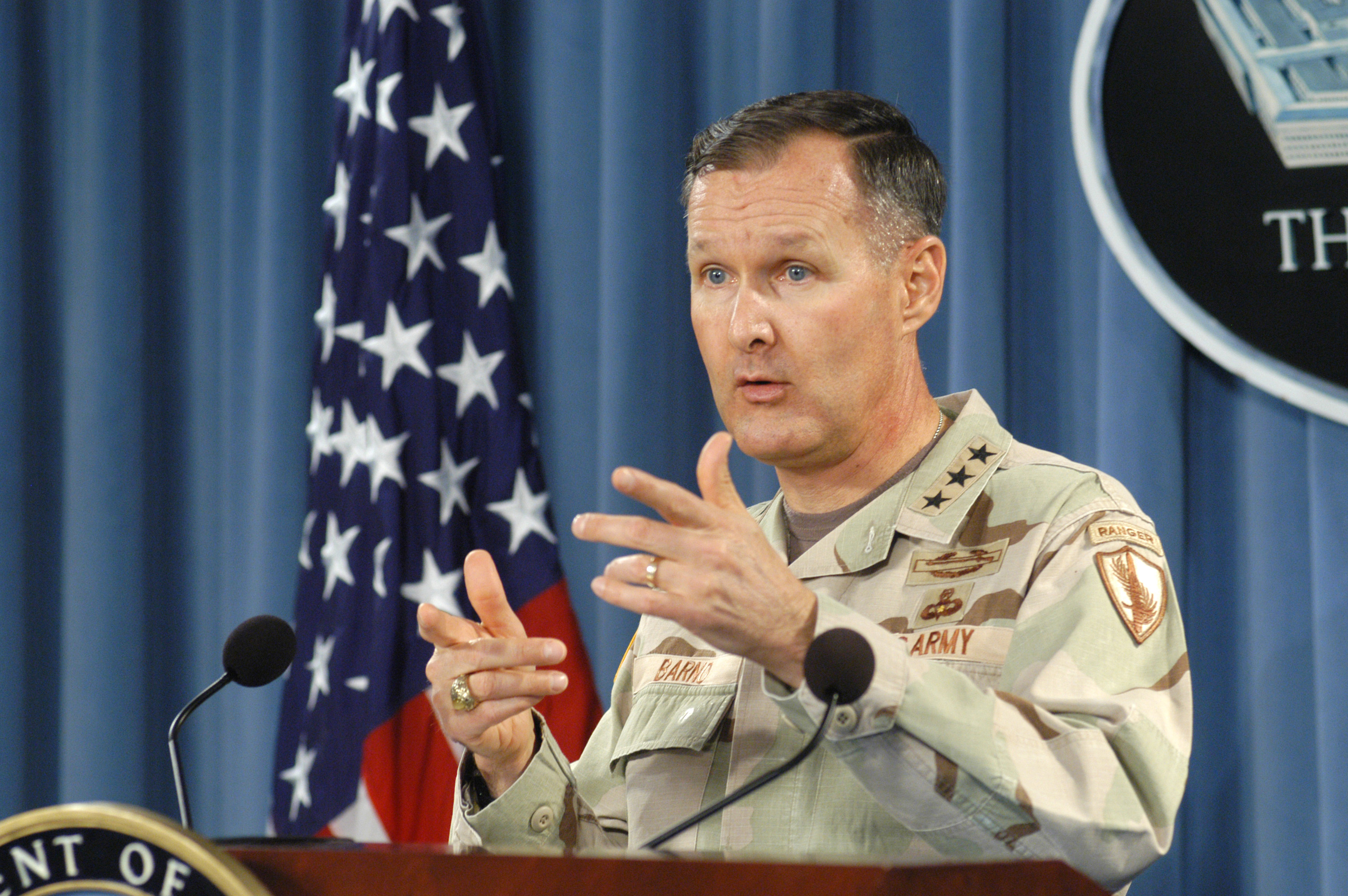
General Barno during a press conference at The Pentagon on October 19, 2004.

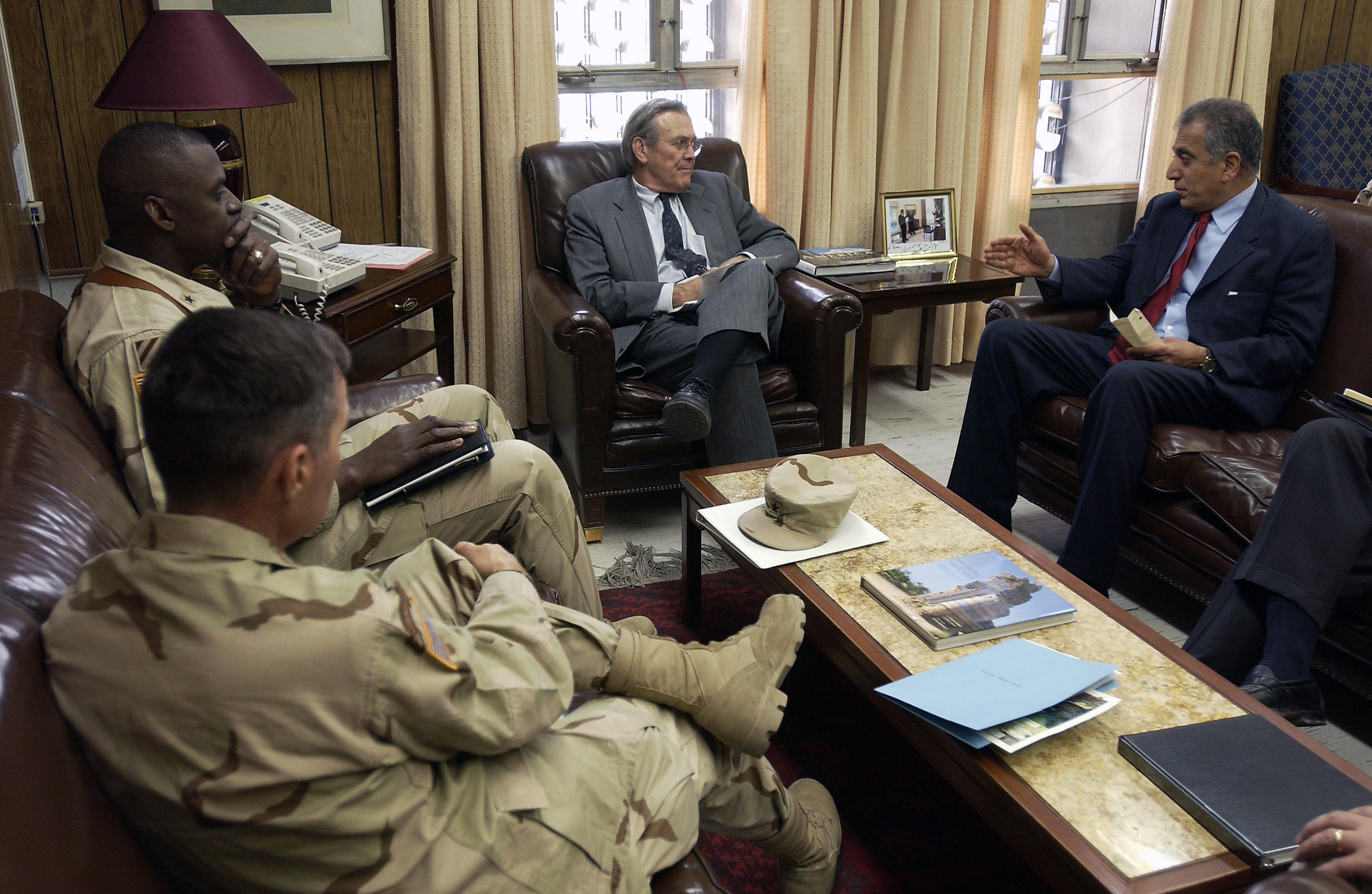
Lieutenant General David Barno converse with Secretary of Defense Donald Rumsfeld during Barno tenure as Commander, Combined Forces Command-Afghanistan, at Kandahar, Afghanistan, December 4, 2003.

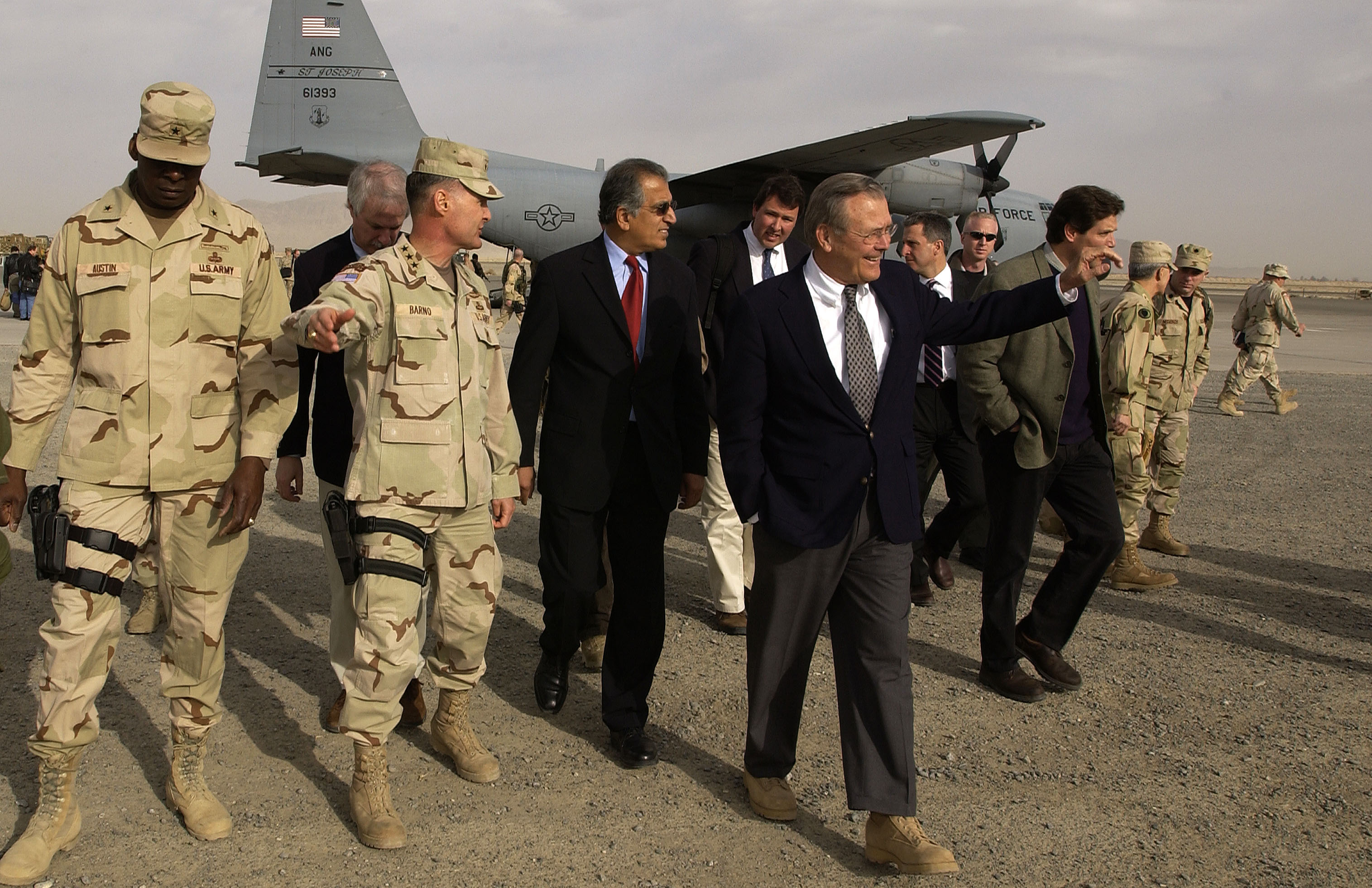
Lieutenant General David Barno with Brigadier General Lloyd Austin accompanying Secretary of Defense Donald Rumsfeld during Rumsfeld's visit to Kandahar, Afghanistan on February 26, 2004.

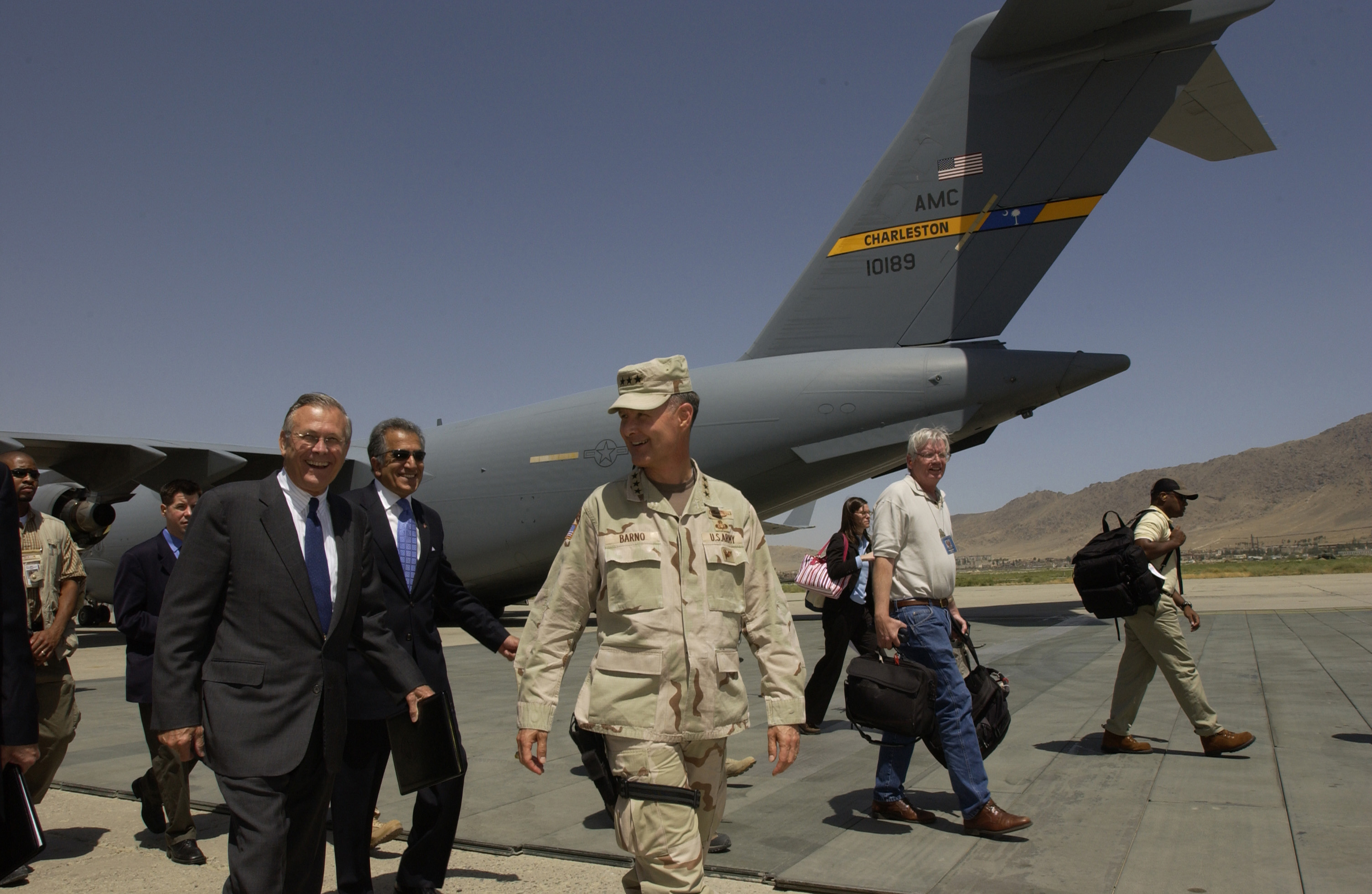
independently Rumsfeld, Khalizad, & Barno, 2004.

Barno was commissioned a second lieutenant of infantry upon graduation from the United States Military Academy at West Point, New York, with the class of June 1976. He started his career with the 25th Infantry Division, where he served as a rifle, weapons and scout platoon leader. He commanded companies in the 25th Infantry Division and the 1st Ranger Battalion, leading a Ranger Rifle Company during the invasion of Grenada in 1983.

In 1988, Barno joined the 2nd Ranger Battalion as the S-3 (Operations) officer where he played a key role in the planning and execution of the subsequent invasion of Panama. In December 1989, he parachuted with the 75th Ranger Regiment into Rio Hato, Panama during Operation Just Cause. He subsequently served as the aide de camp to the commanding general of the U.S. Army Training and Doctrine Command.

General Barno commanded the 3rd Battalion, 505th Parachute Infantry Regiment in the 82nd Airborne Division at Fort Bragg, North Carolina, followed by command of the 2nd Ranger Battalion at Ft Lewis, Washington. Following attendance at the Army War College, he commanded the Warrior Brigade, a multi-functional support brigade at Fort Polk, Louisiana, which supported the Joint Readiness Training Center. He then directed the Joint Task Force training program at Joint Forces Command, Norfolk, Virginia. Between three Ranger Battalion tours and command of the 3rd Bn, 505th PIR in the 82nd Airborne Division, he accumulated over 110 parachute jumps during his career, to include a 500-foot night-time parachute assault into Panama in 1989, during which most jump aircraft were struck by enemy fire. He was twice awarded the Combat Infantryman's Badge, and earned the Ranger Tab and Master Parachutist Badge with Combat Jump Star.

Following selection to brigadier general, General Barno served as the assistant division commander (operations) for the 25th Infantry Division as well as deputy director of operations, U.S. Pacific Command. Barno was promoted to major general in 2001 and served as the commanding general, Ft Jackson, SC, the Army's largest training base. During his time at Ft Jackson, he led Chief of Staff Army Task Forces on the Future Force Soldier and Warrior Ethos. Barno was the principal author of the Army's transformational 2003 Warrior Ethos which dictates: "Mission First, Never Accept Defeat, Never Quit, and Never Leave Behind a Fallen Comrade." In January 2003, Barno was deployed to Hungary as the Commanding General of Task Force Warrior tasked to train Free Iraqi Forces in support of Operation Iraqi Freedom.

General Barno was promoted to lieutenant general (three stars) in 2003 at age 49, becoming the first member of his West Point class of 1976 to achieve that distinction. In October 2003, he deployed to Afghanistan where he was designated to establish a three-star headquarters in Kabul and ultimately command over 20,000 Coalition Forces for 19 months as the first commander, Military Operations-Afghanistan (later redesignated Combined Forces Command-Afghanistan, United States Central Command, Afghanistan). During his tenure, he forged a close relationship with U.S. Ambassador Zalmay Khalilzad, co-locating his command at the US Embassy compound and creating an integrated civil-military Counter-insurgency campaign plan for Afghanistan focused on the Afghan population. In the absence of an official US military post-Vietnam COIN doctrine, he based his counter-insurgency strategy off his U.S. Military Academy Revolutionary Warfare class notes and COIN works by T. E. Lawrence, the USMC Small Wars Manual, Lewis Sorley's A Better War, and Learning to Eat Soup With a Knife by John Nagl.

After commanding in Afghanistan, General Barno was reassigned to The Pentagon in Washington, DC where he served briefly on the Army Staff as the assistant chief of staff for installation management (ACSIM) until his decision to retire in the spring of 2006.

== Post-military career ==
Following his retirement from active duty, Barno served as the director of the Near East South Asia Center for Strategic Studies (NESA) at the National Defense University in Washington, D.C. from 2006 until April 2010. During this time, he testified over a dozen times before Congress on counter-insurgency in Afghanistan and Pakistan, Al Qaeda and Joint Professional Military Education, as well as lectured and wrote extensively on those topics. Barno also travelled widely throughout the Middle East and South Asia region in his NESA director capacity, and lectured at Harvard, Yale, Tufts, Johns Hopkins SAIS, West Point, and the US Army and Naval War Colleges. From 2007 to 2009, he also served as the Chairman of the Advisory Committee on Operation Iraqi Freedom and Operation Enduring Freedom Veterans and Families for the Secretary of Veterans' Affairs.

Barno joined the Center for a New American Security (CNAS) as a senior advisor and Senior Fellow in May 2010, and later co-directed the center's Responsible Defense Program. During his tenure, he co-authored a wide range of reports on national strategy and the defense budget, reforming the Defense Department, the war in Afghanistan, and women in the military, as well as independently publishing a number of columns at Foreign Policy's online journal. In January 2015, he left CNAS to begin his academic career as a Distinguished Practitioner-in-Residence at American University, and concurrently begin writing the Strategic Outpost column with Dr. Nora Bensahel at the online publication War on the Rocks. He was selected to serve as a member of the Defense Department's Reserve Forces Policy Board in March 2015, a position he held until the board's reorganization in February 2021. He also served as a Non-Resident Senior Fellow at the Atlantic Council from May 2015 to March 2018, where he co-authored with Dr. Bensahel a major report in 2016 entitled The Future of the Army. Barno also served on the US Army War College Board of Visitors from April 2016 until September 2020.

== Recent endeavors ==
In July 2018, Barno joined the Johns Hopkins University Paul H. Nitze School of Advanced International Studies (SAIS) in Washington, D.C. as a Visiting Professor of Strategic Studies and Senior Fellow at the Phillip Merrill Center for Strategic Studies. At SAIS, he co-teaches four graduate courses with Dr. Nora Bensahel, to include The Human Face of Battle, Military Adaptation Under Fire, Military Basics and Strategy II.

He is also a core faculty member for the Master of Arts in Strategic, Cybersecurity and Intelligence (MASCI) studies program, which began in 2021.

Barno and Bensahel published their first book, Adaptation Under Fire: How Militaries Change in Wartime at Oxford University Press in September 2020. Their Strategic Outpost column at War on the Rocks has featured over 85 columns since its first column was published in January 2015, covering a wide range of national security and defense issues. Barno and Bensahel also speak regularly to diverse military and civilian audiences on leader development, military adaptation and the changing character of war.

Barno's articles, book reviews and opinion pieces have appeared in Foreign Policy, The Atlantic, the Washington Post, and numerous military journals. He has appeared in interviews for a wide range of television and radio outlets, including CNN, BBC World, PBS NewsHour, C-SPan's Washington Journal, Al Jazeera, Fox News, Government Matters and NPR.

He is a member of the Council on Foreign Relations and the International Institute of Strategic Studies.

== Military and government issued awards ==
General Barno's many awards and decorations include the Defense Distinguished Service Medal, the Distinguished Service Medal with oak leaf cluster, the Defense Superior Service Medal (three awards), the Legion of Merit with oak leaf cluster, the Bronze Star Medal, the Meritorious Service Medal (with silver and bronze oak leaf clusters), the NATO Meritorious Service Medal, the Department of State Meritorious Honor Award, the Army Commendation and Achievement Medals and several campaign and unit awards for combat actions. He also has been awarded the Combat Infantryman's Badge Master Parachutist Badge with Combat Star, Pathfinder Badge, the Ranger Tab, and the German parachutist badge.

== Dates of rank ==
Dates of Rank
Insignia	Rank	Date
	LTG	November 27, 2003
	MG	February 1, 2003
	BG	January 1, 2000
	COL	September 1, 1996
	LTC	February 1, 1992
	MAJ	December 1, 1986
	CPT	August 1, 1980
	1LT	June 2, 1978
	2LT	June 2, 1976

Military offices
Preceded by Dan K. McNeill	Commander, Combined Forces Command — Afghanistan; 2003–2005	Succeeded by Karl Eikenberry
