= Killing of Phillip Esposito and Louis Allen =

Fragging incident during the Iraq War

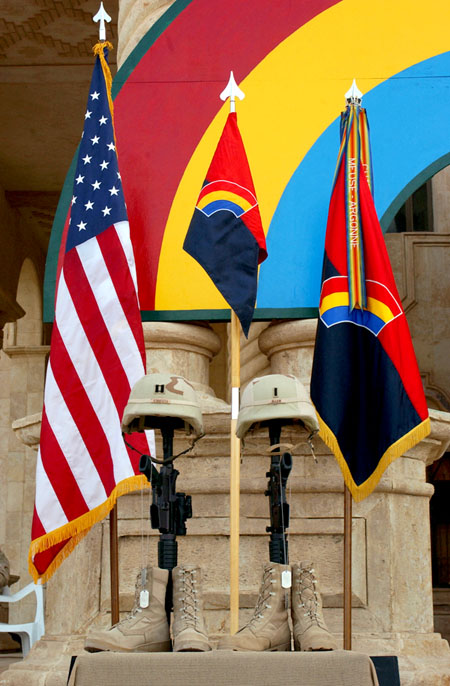
- A temporary memorial to Phillip Esposito and Louis Allen erected in Tikrit shortly after their deaths
- Date: June 7, 2005
- Location: Forward Operating Base Danger, Tikrit, Iraq
- Accused: Staff Sergeant Alberto B. Martinez
- Charges: Two counts of premeditated murder
- Verdict: Acquittal

The killing of Phillip Esposito and Louis Allen occurred on June 7, 2005, at Forward Operating Base Danger in Tikrit, Iraq. Captain Phillip Esposito and First Lieutenant Louis Allen, from a New York Army National Guard unit of the United States 42nd Infantry Division, were mortally wounded in Esposito's office by a Claymore mine and died.

Military investigators determined that the mine was deliberately placed in the window and detonated to kill Esposito and Allen. Staff Sergeant Alberto B. Martinez, who was in the officers' unit, was charged with two counts of premeditated murder. In 2006, two years before the trial, Martinez volunteered in a plea bargain to plead guilty to murder in exchange for a life sentence with parole; Lt. Gen. John Vines, commander of the Army’s 18th Airborne Corps and the convening authority, rejected the deal. In the court martial, Martinez was acquitted on December 4, 2008, at Fort Bragg, North Carolina.

The case was one of only two publicly known alleged fragging incidents among American forces during the Iraq War and the only one to take place in Iraq, in contrast to numerous incidents among United States forces during the Vietnam War of the 1960s and early 1970s. In April 2005, Sergeant Hasan Karim Akbar had been convicted on charges of premeditated murder and sentenced to death for the first incident, which took place in March 2003 in Kuwait.

== Attack ==
On the evening of June 7, 2005, Captain Phillip Esposito, 30, and First Lieutenant Louis Allen, 34, were playing the board game Risk in Esposito's office in the Water Palace building on the United States Forward Operating Base (FOB) Danger in Tikrit, Iraq. The officers were from the Headquarters and Headquarters Company of the 42nd Infantry Division, a New York Army National Guard unit from Troy, New York; it was deployed to Iraq in support of American operations in the Iraq War. Esposito was the company commander and had been stationed in Iraq about six months. Allen was the company's new operations officer; he had arrived in the unit just four days before.

At 10 p.m., an M18A1 Claymore mine placed next to the window of Esposito's office exploded, blasting 700 steel ball bearings into the office space and fatally wounding the two officers. Seconds later, several grenades exploded in the vicinity of Esposito's office. The two injured officers were rushed to a hospital at Forward Operating Base Speicher. Both died early June 8, 2005, from serious internal injuries suffered in the first explosion.

== Victims ==
- Philip Esposito, a project manager for Smith Barney in Manhattan, lived in Suffern, New York, with his wife and eighteen-month-old daughter. He was a graduate of the United States Military Academy at West Point. More than 500 people attended his funeral on June 16, 2005, after his body was returned home.
- Louis Allen, a high-school physics and earth sciences teacher in Tuxedo, New York, lived in Milford, Pennsylvania, with his wife and four young sons.

== Focus on Martinez ==
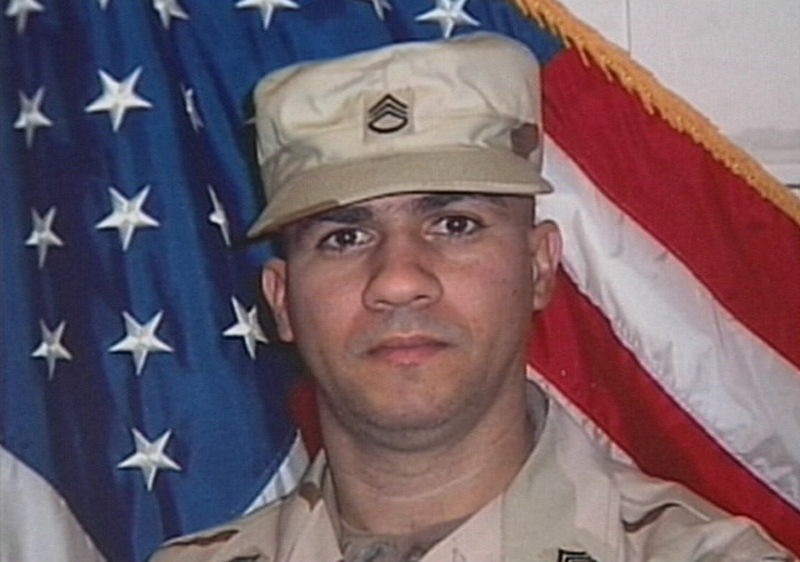
In 2005, Army prosecutors accused Staff Sergeant Alberto B. Martinez of Schaghticoke, New York, (above), of murdering Captain Phillip Esposito and First Lieutenant Louis Allen. An XVIII Airborne Corps court-martial subsequently acquitted Martinez of all charges on December 4th, 2008.

Military investigators initially thought that the two officers were killed by an insurgent mortar or rocket attack. When they determined that the blast was deliberately caused by a hand-placed explosive device, they began looking for suspects. Learning that Staff Sergeant Alberto B. Martinez, 37, had made numerous threats against Esposito, and based on their investigation, they arrested and charged him with two counts of premeditated murder. This happened the same week in June that Esposito and Allen were buried in their hometowns.

From Schaghticoke, New York, near Troy, Martinez was married with two children. He had joined the New York Army National Guard in 1990 and been assigned to Iraq in 2004. He was serving as the supply sergeant of the unit headed by Esposito and Allen.

Esposito and Martinez had come into conflict before arriving in Tikrit in April 2004, as Esposito tried to bring the sergeant in line. Martinez was later described in court "as a poorly disciplined and foul-mouthed guardsman who needed a special waiver to qualify for duty." Witnesses testified that Martinez "could not account for hundreds of thousands of dollars in missing equipment." Esposito eventually restricted Martinez from going into the supply area without an escort. Martinez feared Esposito would get him kicked out of the National Guard, costing him US$2,859 in monthly pay.

Witnesses later testified that Martinez had openly threatened to kill Esposito, who had previously disciplined him for poor job performance; Esposito had also initiated proceedings that might have resulted in Martinez being discharged from the military or removed from his full-time Guard position. Esposito was considered the target of the attack, as Allen had arrived in the unit in Tikrit only days before. Witnesses placed Martinez in the vicinity of the Water Palace shortly after the explosion.

== Proceeding to trial ==
In October and November 2005, the United States Army held an Article 32 hearing, similar to a grand jury hearing, in Kuwait rather than Tikrit, in order to allow the wives of Martinez, Esposito and Allen to attend; all three did. In addition, the Army arranged for transmission of an audio link of the two-day proceedings to West Point to allow other family members in the U.S. to follow them. Nine witnesses testified. Colonel Patrick Reinert recommended a general court-martial for Martinez on murder charges based on the evidence presented.

In early 2006, Martinez learned of additional evidence against him. This included testimony from a soldier who said she had given Claymore mines and grenades to Martinez shortly before the killings. On April 3, 2006, he volunteered to plead guilty to murder in exchange for a life sentence with the possibility of parole after ten years. Lieutenant General John Vines, commander of the XVIII Airborne Corps and convening authority over the legal proceedings, rejected the plea agreement. Vines sent the case to court-martial under two counts of premeditated murder, Article 118 of the Uniform Code of Military Justice.

In April 2007, the defense asked for more time to prepare its case and presented the judge with four motions. In addition to the charges of premeditated murder, Martinez was charged with one count each of wrongful possession of a privately owned firearm, unexploded ordnance, and alcohol, as well as wrongfully giving government property – in this case printers and copiers – to an Iraqi national. One of the defense motions was to sever the murder charges from the others. The case was scheduled to go to trial in August 2007.

In August 2008, the defense asked the judge to dismiss the murder charges because of what they alleged was the prosecutor trying to influence a witness who could help the defense. The judge refused the request.

The court-martial was held at Fort Bragg, North Carolina, beginning in October 2008, with Colonel Stephen Henley sitting as the trial judge. During the trial, Sergeant Sandra Pelton, a 42nd Division cook, testified for the prosecution that Martinez twice mentioned fragging when he came through her dining facility a few days before the explosion. On one occasion when Pelton asked Martinez how he was doing, he made a noise simulating an explosion and said, "Frag him, frag. I mean it." Approximately twenty other soldiers and officers testified that they had heard Martinez threaten or insult Esposito.

Martinez's defense team countered that the Army's evidence against Martinez was circumstantial, and prosecution witnesses' testimonies were inconsistent. The defense team also presented evidence that Martinez was not the only soldier in the unit with a grudge against Esposito. After two days of deliberations, the jury acquitted Martinez on December 4, 2008. In the military, at the time, a two-thirds vote by the jury was needed for conviction. The prosecutor in the case speculated that some jurors' known opposition to the death penalty may have influenced their votes for acquittal.

== Acquittal and honorable discharge ==
Soon after his acquittal, Martinez received an honorable discharge from the National Guard. Publicly, Martinez "proclaimed his innocence and a sense of vindication." Military prosecutors repeated their belief in Martinez's guilt.

In 2009, a report in The New York Times revealed that Martinez had offered in 2006 to plead guilty to second-degree murder in an attempted plea bargain that was ultimately rejected by the government. His guilty plea offer was signed by his two Army defense lawyers, who were permitted by Army regulations to sign the offer only if they believed at the time that Martinez committed the crime. Subsequent debate was twofold: one question arose over whether the government's pursuit of the death penalty may lead defendants to plead to crimes they have not committed in order to avoid death as a punishment. Another question focused on the alleged inflexibility of the military's punishment scheme, as the government had apparently rejected Martinez's 2006 plea on the grounds that Martinez would have been eligible for parole within ten years if sentenced to life, even after pleading guilty to second-degree murder in the slaying of Esposito and Allen.

== Post-acquittal ==
In 2009, Esposito's widow, Siobhan Esposito, opposed the Obama Administration's nomination of Major General Joseph J. Taluto as director of the Army National Guard. She argued that Taluto, who had served as the commanding general of her husband's National Guard unit, was negligent when leaders under his command failed to hold Martinez to account for his many threats against her husband. After Esposito complained to the Senate Armed Services Committee about Taluto, he withdrew his nomination. She also argued that military leaders should strictly enforce regulations that prohibit threats against superiors and encourage soldiers to report violations of military discipline.

In 2009, Allen's widow, Barbara Allen, initiated an effort to compel the Army to posthumously award the Purple Heart to her husband for his slaying. She unsuccessfully petitioned the Military Awards Board and the Secretary of the Army for a hearing on the matter. As of January 2017, the Army has denied her request, citing the lack of a "nexus to enemy action" that would merit an awarding of the medal. Allen also wrote a memoir about her experiences in the face of her husband's death, Martinez's court-martial, and his acquittal.

On January 22, 2017, Martinez died in Florida of unspecified causes.

The case was one of only two publicly known instances of enlisted U.S. soldiers charged with intentionally killing superior officers during the Iraq War, and the only one to occur in Iraq. To date, the Army has not publicly identified or charged any other individual in Esposito and Allen's slaying.
