= United States military jury =

A United States military "jury" serves a function similar to an American civilian jury, but with several notable differences. Only a general court-martial (which may impose any sentences, from dishonorable discharge to death) or special court-martial (which can impose sentences of up to one year of confinement and bad-conduct discharge) includes members. There are no members in a trial by summary court-martial (which can impose sentences of up to 30 days of confinement). If the defendant at a general or special court-martial chooses to be tried by members rather than by a military judge alone, the members are responsible for rendering the verdict, while the judge renders the sentence in a non-capital case. In capital cases they also render the sentence or may refer the decision to the judge for a lower sentence. The charges are brought forward by an officer called a "convening authority", who also selects the members who try the accused. The charges are prosecuted by judge advocates called "trial counsel". Defendants facing general or special courts-martial are represented free of charge from judge advocates acting as defense counsel. Defendants may also be represented at general or special courts-martial by civilian attorneys hired at their own expense. While not required by Congressional law, service policy provides that, at summary courts-martial, many military accused receive representation from a judge advocate defense counsel free of charge.

== Mechanics ==
=== Jury composition ===
The convening authority must detail at least four members in a special court-martial, at least eight members in a general court-martial, and at least twelve members in a general court-martial where the death penalty is possible. The military judge, after challenges, impanels only the minimum number from the remaining members. The convening authority chooses "such members of the armed forces as, in his opinion, are best qualified for the duty by reason of age, education, training, experience, length of service, and judicial temperament."

If the defendant is a commissioned officer, all of the members must also be commissioned officers. If the defendant is a warrant officer, the members may be either commissioned officers or warrant officers. If the defendant is an enlisted member of the armed forces, the members may be commissioned officers, warrant officers, and enlisted members. An enlisted defendant may request to be tried by a panel entirely made up of officers, or a panel at least one-third of whom are enlisted.

=== Verdicts ===
The members vote by secret written ballot on each of the allegations the accused person faces, with each member having one vote on each charge. Unlike most civilian jurisdictions, a unanimous verdict is not required in most cases. Unless the death penalty is possible for the offense in question, the members may convict by a three-fourths majority. If the death penalty is possible if convicted, then the members must be unanimous in their verdict. As such, military juries are incapable of being a hung jury.

== See also ==
- Uniform Code of Military Justice
- Military law
- Courts-martial in the United States
