= Baghran =

Location in Helmand Province, Afghanistan

Baghran بغران
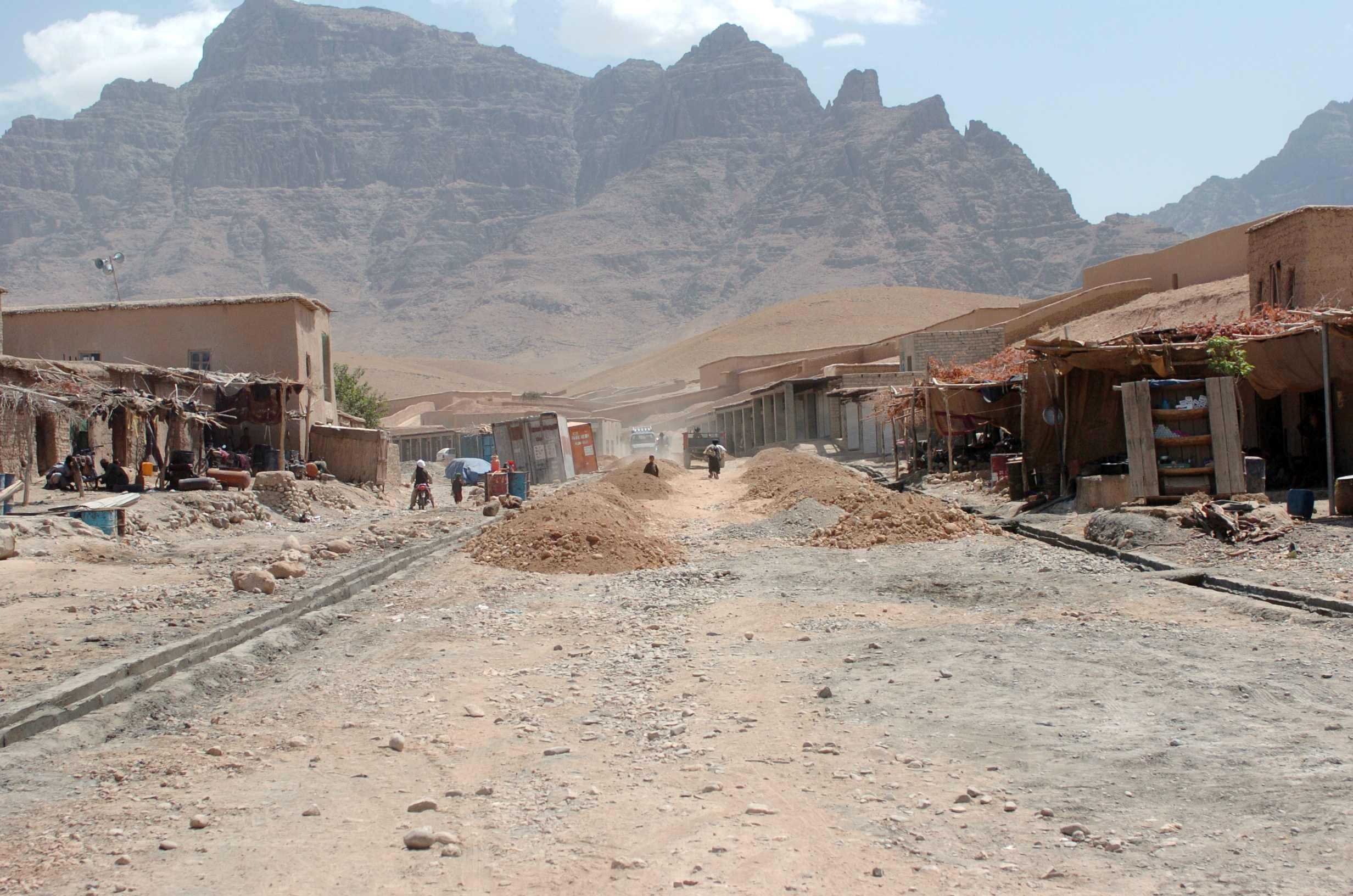
- Baghran's main street is being resurfaced as part of a foreign reconstruction project.

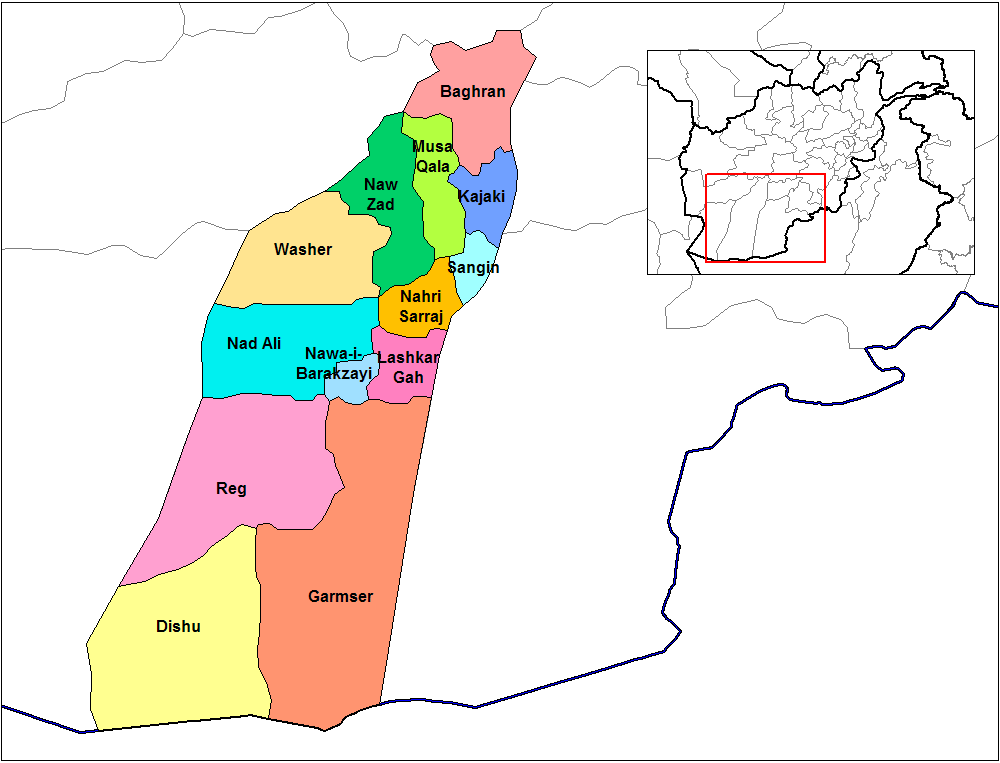
- Coordinates: 33°4′1″N 65°5′30″E
- Country: Afghanistan
- Province: Helmand
- District: Baghran
- Elevation: 5,131 ft (1,564 m)

Population
  - Total: 26,724
- Time zone: + 4.30

Baghrān (Pashto: بغران) is a village and the district center of Baghran District in Helmand province, Afghanistan. It is located at 33.0669°N 65.0917°E and at an altitude of 1,564 m. The population of Baghran and the nearest settlements is 26,724.

In 2005 the United States was funding a $2 million project to pave 700 meters of the Baghran's main road.

It is controlled by the Taliban, and has been called their "most secure stronghold".

== Climate ==
Baghran features a humid continental climate (Köppen: Dsa) with hot summers and moderately cold winters.

Climate data for Baghran
Month	Jan	Feb	Mar	Apr	May	Jun	Jul	Aug	Sep	Oct	Nov	Dec	Year
Daily mean °C (°F)	−2.5 (27.5)	−0.3 (31.5)	6.4 (43.5)	13.7 (56.7)	17.8 (64.0)	22.3 (72.1)	24.0 (75.2)	22.6 (72.7)	17.7 (63.9)	12.2 (54.0)	5.8 (42.4)	0.8 (33.4)	11.7 (53.1)
Average precipitation mm (inches)	46.1 (1.81)	90.4 (3.56)	67.0 (2.64)	40.0 (1.57)	14.9 (0.59)	1.2 (0.05)	0.7 (0.03)	0.8 (0.03)	0.7 (0.03)	6.6 (0.26)	30.1 (1.19)	11.4 (0.45)	309.9 (12.21)
Average relative humidity (%)	41	43	34	25	17	10	11	12	11	19	32	34	24
Source 1: ClimateCharts
Source 2: World Weather Online (precipitation & humidity)

== See also ==
- Helmand Province
