= Dan K. McNeill =

United States Army general

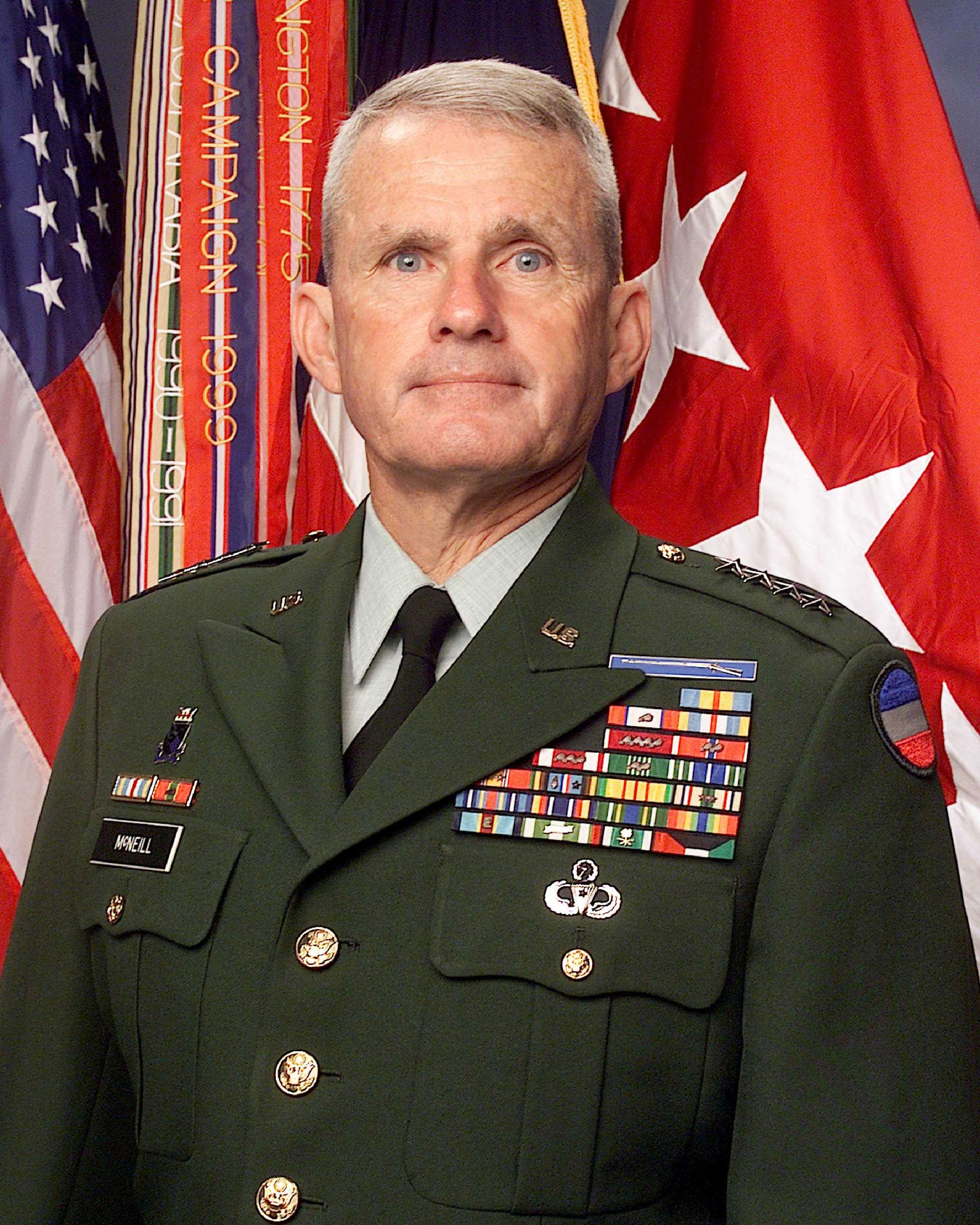
- General Dan Kelly McNeill; Commanding General, U.S. Army Forces Command
- Born: Dan Kelly McNeill; 23 July 1946 (age 80); Warsaw, North Carolina, U.S.
- Military career
- Allegiance: United States of America
- Branch: United States Army
- Service years: 1968–2008
- Rank: General
- Commands: International Security Assistance Force; U.S. Army Forces Command; Combined Joint Task Force-180; XVIII Airborne Corps; 82nd Airborne Division
- Conflicts: Vietnam War; Invasion of Panama; Gulf War; War in Afghanistan
- Awards: Defense Distinguished Service Medal; Distinguished Service Medal (2); Defense Superior Service Medal; Legion of Merit (5); Bronze Star (3); Expert Infantryman Badge; Master Parachutist Badge (with Bronze Service Star); US Army Aviator Badge; Special Forces Tab

Dan Kelly McNeill (born 23 July 1946) is a retired four-star general in the United States Army. He served as Commander, Coalition Forces, Afghanistan from 2002 to 2003 and as Commanding General, U.S. Army Forces Command (FORSCOM) from 2004 to 2007. He then served as Commander, International Security Assistance Force (ISAF) in Afghanistan from February 2007 to June 2008.

According to Eurasianet, McNeill opposed the local ceasefires and economic development programs that had been favored by the outgoing NATO commander, British General David Richards. The attempted targeting of Taliban commander Abdul Ghafour, through aerial bombardment, on 4 February 2007, was seen as a sign of the policy changes McNeill wanted to introduce.

Officials in several European countries have quietly expressed concern about placing an American general in charge of the NATO force. Richards tried to create a less harsh, more economic-development-oriented identity for NATO in Afghanistan, as compared to the "kicking-down-doors" image that US forces have. Many local analysts expect NATO forces to embrace a more aggressive stance under McNeill, who is believed to oppose the type of local peace arrangements that Richards promoted. The danger at this point is that an overly aggressive NATO force in Afghanistan could alienate Afghans, and thus cause the Taliban’s support base to grow.

McNeill was featured in the academy award-winning documentary Taxi to the Dark Side (2007). The film captured McNeil refusing to admit 'any blunt force trauma' that caused Dilawar's death, despite the fact that the certificate of death had already stated 'Homicide'.

== Awards and decorations ==
His awards and decorations included the

| Defense Distinguished Service Medal |
| Army Distinguished Service Medal (with one bronze oak leaf cluster) |
| Defense Superior Service Medal |
| Legion of Merit (with four bronze oak leaf clusters) |
| Bronze Star (with two bronze oak leaf clusters) |
| Meritorious Service Medal (with three oak leaf clusters) |
| Army Commendation Medal (with two oak leaf clusters) |
| Army Achievement Medal |

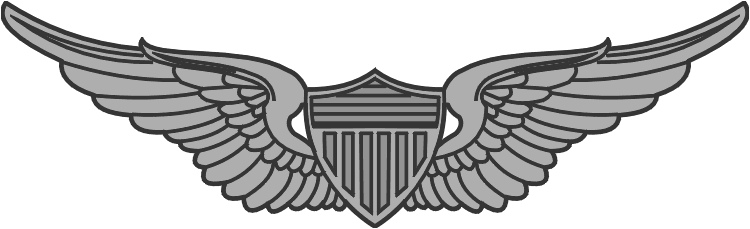
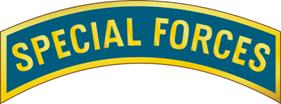
| Expert Infantryman Badge |
| US Parachutist Badge with combat jump star |
| US Army Aviator Badge |
| Special Forces Tab |

Military offices
| Preceded by Position established | Commander, Combined Joint Task Force 180; 2002-2003 | Succeeded by David Barno (as Commander CFC-A) |
| Preceded by David Richards | Commander, International Security Assistance Force; February 2007-June 2008 | Succeeded by David D. McKiernan |
