= Joint task force =

Ad hoc military formation

A joint task force is a "joint" (multi-service) ad hoc military formation. The task force concept originated with the United States Navy in the 1920s and 1930s.

"Combined" is the British-American military term for multi-national formations.

- CTF – Commander Task Force, sometimes Combined Task Force
- CCTF – Commander Combined Task Force
- CJTF – Combined Joint Task Force (multi-service and multi-national). During the late 1990s creating CJTFs was part of arranging greater European Union - North Atlantic Treaty Organisation cooperation; see Berlin Plus agreement.

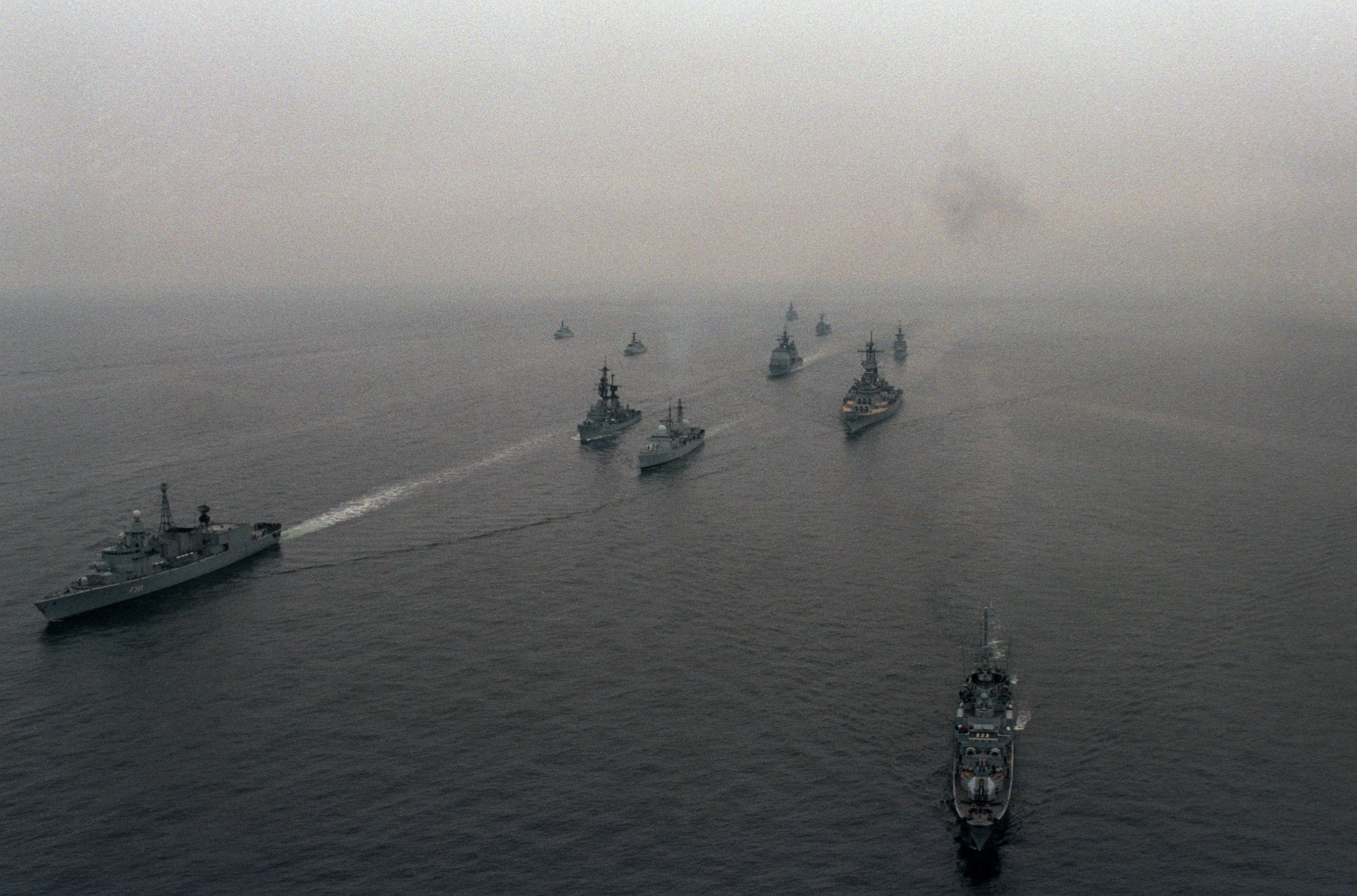
Ships of Task Group 100.1 during Exercise BALTOPS, 1985

There are two ways in which a U.S. or U.S.-allied task force may be assigned a number. The first is the originally naval scheme promulgated and governed by the Military Command, Control, Communications, and Computers Executive Board (MC4EB), chaired by the Joint Staff J6. Task force numbers allocated under this scheme form the majority of the listings below.

The second is a by-product of the U.S. Army's procedure for forming task-organised forces for combat, differing from strictly doctrinally assigned table of organization and equipment organizations. A battalion, company or brigade commander has very wide latitude in selecting a task force name, though often the name of the commander is used (e.g. Task Force Faith; Task Force Smith was named for the commander of the 1st Battalion, 21st Infantry Regiment). This has often resulted in derivations from the originator unit's numerical designation being used. For example, when a special operations aviation unit was being formed in the late 1970s, the original unit drew heavily on personnel from the 158th Aviation. The designation chosen was Task Force 158, which later grew to become the 160th Special Operations Aviation Regiment. Another example comes from 2004 in Afghanistan. On 15 April 2004 the headquarters of the U.S. Army's 25th Infantry Division arrived in Afghanistan and took command of CJTF-180 from the 10th Mountain Division. Lieutenant General David Barno, commanding then decided to rename CJTF 180 because the "180" designation had traditionally been given to Joint task forces led by the Army's XVIII Airborne Corps. Barno chose Combined Joint Task Force 76 as the new name to evoke America's history and the democratic spirit of 1776. The CFC-A commander intended this new designation to highlight the change in command at the operational level at a time when Afghanistan appeared to be moving closer to democracy.

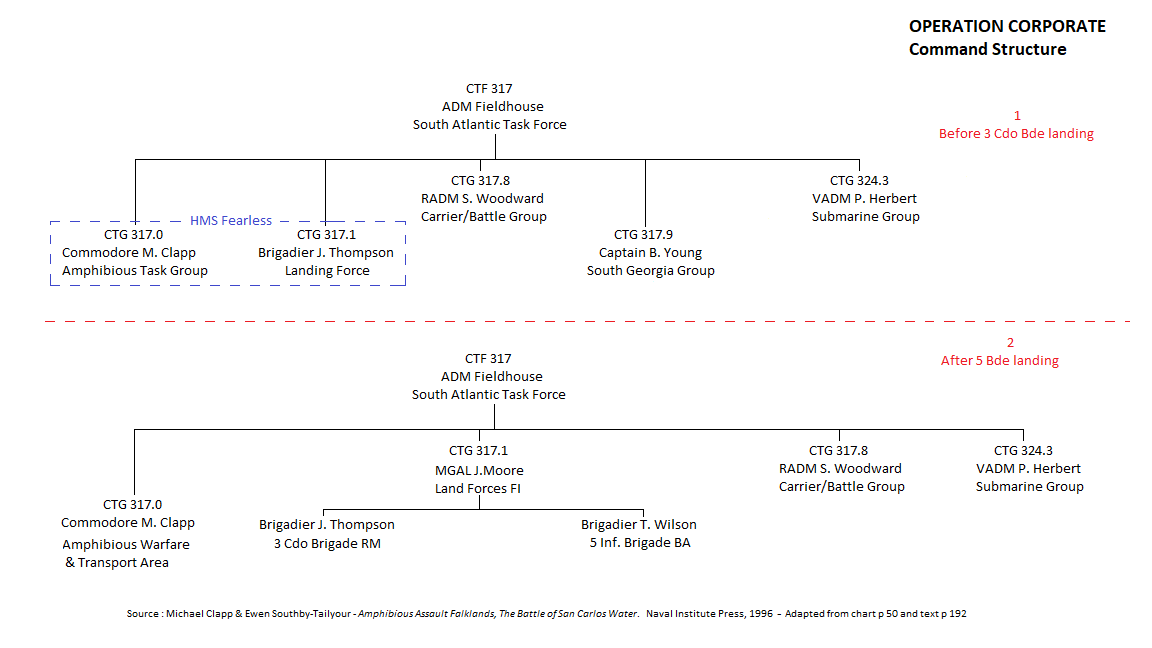
An example of a changing naval task force structure, promulgated by signal: the Royal Navy in the Falklands War

No coordination appears to occur between U.S. Army task forces designated in this way, and the USMCEB scheme. This has resulted in simultaneous designations being used at the same time. For example, Combined Joint Task Force 76, was in use in Afghanistan in 2004, but doubling up on the Task Force 76 designation used for decades by Amphibious Force, United States Seventh Fleet, in north Asia.

Joint Task Force Exercise (JTFEX) is designed to test a strike group's ability to operate in hostile and complex environments with other U.S. and coalition forces. The integrated exercise combines specific warfare areas with the purpose of making preparations for the strike group's upcoming deployment. An example of such an exercise includes The John F. Kennedy (CV-67) Carrier Battle Group which participated in Joint Task Force Exercise (JTFEX) 02–1, in the waters off the East Coast as well as on training ranges in North Carolina and Florida during Operation Enduring Freedom January 19, 2002

== Numbered USMCEB joint task forces ==
Allied Communications Publication 113: Call Signs Book for Ships in its Annex B lists allocations of task force numbers from 1 to approximately 1000, allocated by the United States Military Communications-Electronic Board in blocks for use by the United States Department of Defense and allies.

Norman Polmar noted in Ships and Aircraft of the U.S. Fleet, 2005, that the task forces under the commanders of the Atlantic and Pacific Fleet are mainly for contingency purposes. They are employed for specific operations and exercises.

Combined Task Force (CTF) 13 conducted a simulated long range raid on Camp Hanson, Okinawa Japan, March 21, 2016. CTF-13 conducted the raid, which commenced in South Korea, to demonstrate air assault, multi-continent long-range raid capabilities, and the ability to strike and destroy. CTF 13 included 1st Battalion, 3rd Marines.

Joint task force	Abbrev.	State	Notes
Joint Task Force 1	JTF-1	US	Operation Crossroads, Task Force One later utilized for Operation Sea Orbit
Joint Task Force 2	JTF-2	CAN	In September 1964, Major General George Brown was selected to organize and command JTF-2, a Joint Chiefs of Staff organization formed at Sandia Base, New Mexico, to test the services' weapon systems. It was staffed by personnel of all three services. Low Altitude Program nuclear test organisation, 1965–70. In 1990s seemingly transferred to Canada, possibly completely out of USMCEB formal system for use by Canadian special forces. The Canadian SOF unit that took this designation was formed on 1 April 1993.
Joint Task Force 3	JTF-3	US	Formed late 1949 in preparation for Operation Greenhouse nuclear test series.
Joint Task Force 4	JTF-4	US	From 1960 to 1 December 1963, planning headquarters for Sub-Saharan Africa, responsible to Atlantic Command. Lt Gen Louis W. Truman reassigned as chief of staff for Caribbean operations during Cuban Missile Crisis. Superseded by creation of CINCMEAFSA (Commander-in-Chief U.S. Strike Command). Drug interdiction task force in Caribbean Sea from December 1989. Became Joint Interagency Task Force East on 1 October 1994. Later amalgamated into Joint Interagency Task Force South in 1994. Later became post-conflict reconstruction task force, eventually to become the ill-fated Office for Reconstruction and Humanitarian Assistance.
Joint Task Force 5	JTF-5	US	Drug interdiction task force at Coast Guard Island, Alameda, California, from December 1989. Later became Joint Interagency Task Force West.
Joint Task Force 6	JTF-6	US	Drug interdiction task force at El Paso, Texas, from December 1989. Became Joint Task Force North in 2004. Now seemingly Task Force 6, the naval component commander, U.S. Africa Command, an additional duty post for Commander, Sixth Fleet.
Joint Task Force 7	JTF-7	US	Operation Sandstone, a series of nuclear weapon tests in 1948; Operation Chromite, Inchon amphibious landing under Vice Admiral Arthur Struble. As Commander, Joint Task Force Seven, and Commander, Seventh Fleet, Struble was in command of the amphibious phase of the operation. Used for Operation Castle atomic tests in the 1940s-1950s.
Combined Joint Task Force 7	CJTF-7	US	CJTF 7 was the interim military formation that directed the U.S. military effort in Iraq between June 2003 and May 2004.
Joint Task Force 8	JTF-8	US	TF 8 was the USS Enterprise (CV-6) carrier task force in 1941; during the 1942 Aleutian Islands campaign Rear Admiral Robert A. Theobald commanded Task Force 8 afloat. Theobald as Commander North Pacific Force (ComNorPac) reported to Admiral Nimitz, Commander-in-Chief Pacific Ocean Areas, in Hawaii. Task Force 8 consisted of five cruisers, thirteen destroyers, three tankers, six submarines, as well as naval aviation elements of Fleet Air Wing Four. Later JTF 8 was the Operation Dominic nuclear test organization, April–November 1962.
Joint Task Force 11	JTF-11	US	During World War II, Task Force 11 was a United States Navy aircraft carrier task force in the Pacific theater. JTF at Soto Cano Air Base, 1983. By 1984 redesignated Joint Task Force Bravo.
Task Force 12	TF-12	US	Theater Anti-Submarine Warfare Force, Pacific / Patrol and Reconnaissance Force, Pacific (PATRECONFORPAC).
Task Force 13	TF-13	US	In 1945, was Amphibious Training Command, U.S. Pacific Fleet.
Task Force 14	TF-14	US	Force sent to raid Wake Island on 5–6 October 1943. Under Rear Admiral Alfred E. Montgomery, the force included Essex, Lexington, USS Yorktown (CV-10), USS Cowpens (CVL-25), two other escort carriers, two heavy and four light cruisers, and 24 destroyers.
Task Force 15	TF-15	US	Task Group 15.5 was the Pensacola Convoy, 1941-42.
Task Force 16	TF-16	US	Celebrated carrier task force c. 1941–42; Service Force, Pacific Fleet, by 1943; Maritime Defense Zone, U.S. Pacific Fleet, commanded by a Coast Guard officer (2005).
Task Force 17	TF-17	US	Celebrated carrier task force during World War II; Submarines, Pacific Fleet, 1943; Naval Air Forces, U.S. Pacific Fleet (2005).
Task Force 18	TF-18	US	USS Hornet (CV-8)'s task force for 1942 Doolittle Raid; Minecraft, Pacific Fleet, under Rear Admiral Alexander Sharp, 1 May 1945 (sometime flagship was USS Terror (CM-5)); Sealift forces, U.S. Pacific Fleet (2005).
Task Force 19	TF-19	US	Air Force, Pacific, December 1, 1943, under Vice Admiral John Towers.
Task Force 20	TF-20	US	Task Group 20.5, a carrier battle group built around USS Independence (CV-62), was part of Operation Urgent Fury in Grenada, 1982. Deputy Commander, Fleet and Joint Operations, U.S. Fleet Forces Command, with responsibility for subordinate seagoing formations, until 1 October 2012.
Task Force 25	TF-25	US	Caribbean Contingency Force, United States Second Fleet
Task Forces 30-39	TF-30	US	All allocated to United States Third Fleet
Task Force 31	TF-31	US	
Task Force 35	TF-35	US	Service forces, South Pacific Force, Rear Admiral Cobb, December 1, 1943.
Task Force 38	TF-38	US	Fast Carrier Task Force, World War II.
Task Force 44	TF-44	US	
Task Forces 50-57	TF-50	US	All allocated to United States Fifth Fleet
Task Force 57	TF-57	US	
Task Force 58	TF-58	US	Recently Maritime Surveillance Force in the North Persian Gulf. Fast Carrier Task Force, World War II.
Task Force 60	TF-60	US	United States Sixth Fleet; Battle Force from c.1950s-c.2010
Task Force 61	TF-61	US	United States Sixth Fleet
Task Force 64	TF-64	US	On 23 September 1942, USS San Francisco (CA-38), Salt Lake City, Minneapolis, Chester, Boise, and Helena, and Destroyer Squadron 12 (DesRon 12) became TF 64, a surface screening and attack force under the command of Rear Admiral Norman Scott in San Francisco. The next day, the force headed to the New Hebrides. Now United States Sixth Fleet.
Task Force 67	TF-67	US	
Task Force 73	TF-73	US	Commander, Logistics Group, Western Pacific, Seventh Fleet, Singapore.
Task Force 74	TF-74	US	Submarine Force, U.S. Seventh Fleet. Previously Enterprise task force during Indo-Pakistani War of 1971.
Task Force 76	TF-76	US	Amphibious Force, United States Seventh Fleet. CJTF 76 was a designation given to a division-sized U.S. Army task force in Afghanistan, seemingly outside the formal USMCEB system.
Task Force 77	TF-77	US	Carrier Striking Force, U.S. Seventh Fleet. As of 2016 built around Carrier Strike Group Five. Also used by a USSOCOM task force, the former Task Force 145, seemingly not within the USMCEB numbering scheme.
Task Force 80	TF-80	US	Roughly in the 2012-2015 period, TF-80 was the Maritime Headquarters component for the U.S. Fleet Forces Command.
Task Force 84	TF-84	US	Seemingly Anti-Submarine Warfare Force, Atlantic (ASWFORLANT).
Task Force 88	TF-88	US	Used during World War II for Task Force 88 (Operation Dragoon); after World War II for Task Force 88 (Operation Argus). Also used by a USSOCOM task force, seemingly not within the USMCEB numbering scheme.
Task Force 90	TF-90	US	Aircraft, North Pacific Force (Maj Gen Davenport Johnson USA, commanding general, Eleventh Air Force), 1 May 1945. Amphibious Force, Naval Forces Far East, during the Korean War, and later involved in Operation Passage to Freedom.
Task Force 91	TF-91	US	Allocated to North Pacific Force, 1945 (as was Task Force 92 as well). In 1944, Rear Admiral Ralph Wood was appointed as Commandant, Seventeenth Naval District, which comprised all of Alaska, together with additional duties (ADDU) as Commander Task Force 91; Fleet Air Wing Four; Deputy Commander, Alaskan Sea Frontier; and Deputy Commander of the North Pacific Force and Area.
Task Force 93	TF-93	US	Strategic Air Forces, Pacific Ocean Areas, 1944–45, under Lt Gen Millard Harmon. Commander Alaskan Sea Frontier, late 1960s. Rear Admiral Donald M. White during SS Robert Louis Stevenson sinking incident, late 1960s.
Task Force 95	TF-95	US	United States Navy, World War II. Established around Okinawa in July 1945 and conducted three operations into the East China Sea before the end of the war in mid-August that year. This iteration of the Task Force was active as late as November 1945. The designation was reactivated for use during the Korean War, when it was used for the United Nations Command Blockading and Escort Force, often helmed by the British Flag Officer Second in Command Far East Fleet. Vice Admiral William Andrewes served as Commander, Task Force 95 (CTF 95), for a period.
Task Force 97	TF-97	US	Hawaiian Sea Frontier - Vice Admiral Robert L. Ghormley, December 1, 1943.
Task Force 98	TF	US	Maj. Gen Richardson, USA, Hawaiian Sector Defence, Hawaiian Department, U.S. Army, local naval defence forces.
Task Force 99	TF	US	Task Force 39 was sent to reinforce the Royal Navy's Home Fleet at Scapa Flow in the Orkney Islands in March 1942. Designation changed to TF 99 about 5 April 1942 (Morison). Consisted of USS Washington, the aircraft carrier USS Wasp (CV-7), the heavy cruisers USS Tuscaloosa (CA-37) and USS Wichita (CA-45), and eight destroyers. It thereafter assist the Home Fleet in covering Arctic convoys bound for the Soviet Union.
Task Force 100	TF 100	US	Involved in USS Liberty incident, 1967. CINCUSNAVEUR established TF 100 under the command of Rear Admiral Renken, Commander, Service Forces, Atlantic, at 0000Z, 12 June 1967. With forces from Sixth Fleet, Commander Fleet Air Mediterranean, Service Forces, Sixth Fleet, Naval Securities Group Europe, plus the Liberty herself, TF 100 was to '..supervise the drydocking of USS Liberty at Malta on or about 13 June 1967 in order to prevent disclosure of classified information and equipment to unauthorised personnel.' TF 100's functions were expected to be completed in about two days. Previously at times held by Deputy Commander-in-Chief United States Naval Forces Europe (DCINCUSNAVEUR). The task force (or Task Group 100.1) was also involved in a mid-May 1975 visit to Leningrad. Leahy and Tattnall, part of Cruiser-Destroyer Group 12, were commanded by Rear Admiral Justin D. Langille III. On 1 April 2010, it was announced that Rear Adm. (lower half) Charles K. Carodine was to be assigned new duties. Carodine was at the time serving as chief of staff, JTF-100 Maritime Operations Center, United States Fleet Forces Command, Norfolk, Va. Also by 2010 TF 100 had become the Service Cryptographic Component Operations task force of United States Tenth Fleet.
Task Force 101	TF 101	US	Northern European Force after 1946–1956. When Admiral Wright became CINCNELM was commanded by Rear Admiral Robert B. Pirie, Chief of Staff to CINCNELM. During the War in Afghanistan (2001-2021), Combined Joint Task Force – 101 was a 101st Airborne Division rotation in Afghanistan.
Task Forces 102-109	TF 102	US	All now seemingly allocated to United States Tenth Fleet.
Task Force 104	TF 104	US	United States Naval Forces Germany, 1944–45, and possibly afterwards
Task Force 111	TF 111	UK/US	Seemingly Admiral Bruce Fraser, Commander-in-Chief, British Pacific Fleet, aboard HMS Duke of York, soon after the end of World War II. A 2019 report by military journalist Wesley Morgan also identified the "CT [counter-terrorism] unit that works for AFRICOM [United States Africa Command] [as] Task Force 111, a JSOC [Joint Special Operations Command] task force that is led by SEAL Team 6." JSOC's Task Force 111 was formerly Task Force 48–4.
Task Forces 111-119	TF 112	UK/US	Allocated to miscellaneous activities on Dec 1, 1943, inc Western, NW Sea Frontier and by September 1945 to British Pacific Fleet.
Task Force 113	TF 113	UK/US	Southeast Pacific Force, Rear Admiral Francis Whiting, December 1, 1943; 110-series designation for British Pacific Fleet Carrier Task Force under Vice Admiral Bernard Rawlings, Vice-Admiral BPF, aboard HMS King George V, November 1945.
Task Force 115	TF 115	US	Coastal Surveillance Force, Naval Forces Vietnam
Task Force 116	TF 116	US	River Patrol Force, Naval Forces Vietnam
Task Force 117	TF 117	US	Mobile Riverine Force, Naval Forces Vietnam
Joint Task Force 120	JTF 120	US	In times of crisis and during certain exercises, Commander Second Fleet became Commander, JTF 120. This joint task force drew from the Atlantic Fleet, U.S. Army airborne and air assault units, U.S. Air Force aircraft and support personnel, U.S. Marine Corps amphibious forces, and at times, the United States Coast Guard. Ran Operation Urgent Fury, the United States invasion of Grenada in October 1983. Later ran Operation Uphold Democracy regarding Haiti in 1994–95.
Task Force 121	TF 121	US	Possibly part of United States Twelfth Fleet during World War II. Task Force of Army Rangers during Operation Urgent Fury, Grenada, 1982. After 2001, one of the designations for the Joint Special Operations Command high value targets task force. This was made up of soldiers, naval personnel, air force personnel, and civilians from the U.S. Army's Delta Force, 75th Ranger Regiment, and 160th Special Operations Aviation Regiment, Naval Special Warfare Development Group, CIA Special Activities Division, USAF Combat Controllers, Pararescuemen, Tactical Air Control Party air force personnel, and Special Operations Weather Technicians, the Aviation Tactics Evaluation Group (AvTEG), and the Joint Communications Unit. Two troops from the U.S. Army 1st Squadron, 1st Cavalry Regiment provided armor support for the Task Force. On occasions, Canadian, British, Australian and Polish special force personnel assisted and augmented the task force. It served in Iraq and Afghanistan.
Task Force 122	TF 122	US	United States Twelfth Fleet, World War II. Commanded by Rear Admiral Alan G. Kirk, who commanded D-Day's Western Naval Task Force (Utah and Omaha Beaches). When the Dominican Civil War of 1965 began, USS Newport News (CA-148) sortied from Norfolk on 29 April for Santo Domingo, where she was flagship for Commander Joint Task Force 122. Newport News remained on station off Santo Domingo until 7 May 1965 when JTF 122 was dissolved, and command was shifted to the Army ashore in the Dominican Republic.
Task Force 123	TF 123	US	82nd Airborne Division, Operation Urgent Fury, Grenada 1982.
Task Force 124	TF 124	US	Omaha Beach landing force, World War II. In Grenada 1982, was the amphibious force, headquartered aboard USS Guam. Now Strategic Communications Wing One, Tinker AFB, Oklahoma (E-6A Mercury aircraft)
Task Force 125	TF 125	US	Designation for Commander, Western Hemisphere Group, when acting as a naval component commander for U.S. Southern Command, circa 1995–2000.
Task Force 130	TF 130	US	Manned Spacecraft Recovery Force, Pacific, for Project Apollo. Flagship USS Arlington (AGMR-2).
Joint Task Force 132	TF 130	US	Operation Ivy nuclear test force.
Task Force 134	TF 134	US	Commander, Task Force 134, COMSUBPAC, is an operational commander responsible to USSTRATCOM for strategic deterrent submarine operations.
Task Force 136	TF 136	US	Under the commander of Commander, Second Fleet, was quarantine force during Cuban Missile Crisis. Led for a time by Commander Cruiser-Destroyer Flotilla 2 aboard USS Canberra.
Task Force 140	TF 140	US	Project Mercury Recovery Force (early 1960s), later Manned Spacecraft Recovery Force, Atlantic (for Apollo 9). In the 1980s, as JTF 140, designation for Second Fleet for Caribbean contingency operations. Ocean Venture '90 was a JCS directed field exercise sponsored by the U.S. Atlantic Command and executed by JTF 140, a standing JTF assigned to LANTCOM which had existed since 1979. Utilised for Haiti operations during 1994.
Task Force 144	TF 144	US	CTF 144, Commander Submarine Forces/COMSUBLANT. Operational commander for Atlantic ballistic missile submarines, responsible to Commander, U.S. Strategic Command
Task Force 151	TF 151	US	Combined Maritime Forces
Task Force 157	TF 157	US	In 1966, the Navy created Task Force 157 as a covert division to control their clandestine human intelligence operations (HUMINT). Disbanded 1977 with some functions transferred to Task Force 168.
Joint Task Force 160	JTF 160	US	Task Groups 160.2 and 160.3 were active in the late 1940s, 160.2 in the Mediterranean, and TG 160.3 as a Africa/S America goodwill cruise, including USS Huntington (CL-107). JTF 160 directed Operation Sea Signal, a humanitarian operation receiving Haitian refugees at Guantanamo Bay Naval Base, Cuba. It took place from August 1994 to February 1996. Task Force 160 was a non-USMCEB, U.S. Army allocation.
Combined Joint Task Force-180	JTF 180	US	Appears to be the permanently assigned designator for HQ XVIII Airborne Corps when operating as a combined joint task force or joint task force, for example in Afghanistan after 2002.
Task Force 214	TF 214	US	Twentieth Air Force, while acting as the ICBM task force for U.S. Strategic Command
Task Force 294	TF 294	US	U.S. Air Force air refueling forces while acting as a task force for U.S. Strategic Command
Task Force 301	TF 301	CAN	Royal Canadian Navy, Atlantic Coast, 1964
Task Force 311	TF 311	UK	Commander, Task Force 311 (CTF-311), located in Northwood, Middlesex, is the Royal Navy's sole submarine operating authority (SUBOPAUTH). CTF-311 maintains operational control of all Britain's attack submarines, wherever they may be.
Task Group 316.1	TF 316	UK	Used for Endeavour 90 deployment, under Capt Franklyn, HMS Bristol (DTS)
Task Force 317	TF 317	UK	For 1974 group deployment by TG 317.2 see HMS Leander (F109); Falklands Task Force; see British naval forces in the Falklands War
Task Force 318	TF 318	UK	In November 1967, TF 318, under Flag Officer Second in Command Far East Fleet, Rear Admiral Edward Ashmore, managed the British withdrawal from Aden after 128 years of colonial rule. Reestablished with effect from 1 November 1971 to cover withdrawal of British forces from Persian Gulf (Roberts, 95)
Task Force 321	TF 321	UK	Seemingly Royal Navy in the Mediterranean and Middle East. Used Cyprus 1974 during Falklands War when RNZN frigates deployed, and after Iraqi invasion of Kuwait (deployed force TG 321.1 in both later cases). In 1990 CINCFLEET acted as CTF 321.
Task Group 323.2	TF 323	UK	RN Mediterranean group during Operation Desert Storm
Task Force 324	TF 324	UK	Royal Navy Red Sea force during Suez Crisis of 1956. Consisted of HMS Newfoundland and others. Newfoundland and HMS Diana (D126) sank the Egyptian frigate 'Domiat' (ex-HMS Nith (K215)) on the first night of the war.
Task Force 326	TF 326	UK	Roberts, 294, says Liverpool and RFA Wave Knight were assigned as Atlantic Patrol Task (North) from February 2005, as TG 326.01. Meanwhile, Gloucester was on Atlantic Patrol Task (South) and relieved by Portland in March 2005, as TG 326.02.
Task Force 330	TF 330	UK	UK naval forces during Operation Telic
Task Force 333	TF 333	UK	Involved in Operation Grapple nuclear tests at Christmas Island, August 1958. TG 333.1 seemingly utilised by Captain 11th Frigate Squadron (Captain F11), Royal New Zealand Navy, in November 1972, during LONGEX 71 between Auckland and Wellington. TGs of TF 333 later used in NATO area (Roberts)
Task Force 345	TF 345	UK	UK Mediterranean naval task force during Suez Crisis of 1956. Now is reported as '..CTF 345 is the organisation that provides command and control of the UK deterrent' at Northwood Headquarters. This is the force of Vanguard-class submarines. Rear Admiral Ian Corder commanded the task force as of September 2012.
Task Force 373	TF 373	US	JSOC or SOCCENT special operations forces task force in Afghanistan
Task Forces 401-410	TF 401	NATO	Striking Fleet Atlantic used TF 401/402/403, during Cold War; TF 410 utilized by SNMG 1 in 2009.
Joint Task Force 435	JTF 435	US	(Combined Joint Interagency Task Force 435) Afghanistan theatre detention operations
Task Force 439	TF 439		NATO attack submarine force, Mediterranean
Task Force 440	TF 440		Operation Sharp Guard, 1993–96 (WEU, SNFL, SNFM)
Task Force 442	TF 442	US	From 1967, Commander Submarine Flotilla 8 became COMSUBMED under NAVSOUTH in addition to wartime SSBN responsibilities as CTF 442.
Task Force 465	TF 465	Allied	Deployed task force of Operation Atalanta, EUNAVFOR Somalia, combating Somali piracy
Task Force 472	TF 472	SEATO (1969)	At the time USS Evans and HMAS Melbourne collided on the early morning on 3 June 1969, both were part of Exercise Task Group 472.1. Command of Task Force 472, and TG 472.1, was being exercised by Rear Admiral G.J.B. Crabb, Flag Officer Commanding Australian Fleet. TF 472 included Melbourne, USS Evans, Kyes, Larson, HMS Blackpool (F77), and HMS Cleopatra (F28). TF 472 was taking part in SEATO Exercise Sea Spirit.
Task Force 473	TF 473	France	Seemingly permanently assigned to the carrier battle group ('aeronaval group') build around Charles de Gaulle. Part of Force d'action navale.
Task Force 500	TF 500	NATO	Flag Officer Denmark (FOD), Allied Forces Baltic Approaches (1963).
Task Force 502	TF 502	NATO	Carrier battle force, Naval Striking and Support Forces, Southern Europe, 1970s-1980s. Provided by U.S. Carrier Group or Cruiser-Destroyer Group headquarters.
Task Force 503	TF 503	NATO	Amphibious force, Naval Striking and Support Forces, Southern Europe, 1970s-1980s. Provided by U.S. Amphibious Squadron headquarters.
Task Force 504	TF 504	NATO	Landing force, Naval Striking and Support Forces, Southern Europe, 1970s-1980s.
Task Force 505	TF 505	NATO	Support force, Naval Striking and Support Forces, Southern Europe, 1970s-1980s.
Task Force 506	TF 506	NATO	Special Operations Force, Naval Striking and Support Forces, Southern Europe, 1970s-1980s.
Task Force 508	TF 508	NATO (or member)	As of late 2013, Operation Ocean Shield Somali counter-piracy force. CTF 508 was Rear Admiral Eugenio Diaz del Rio on board flagship Alvaro de Bazan on 14 January 2014.
Joint Task Force 510	JTF 510	US	Special Operations Command Pacific standing joint task force for rapid deployment. Involved in Operation Enduring Freedom – Philippines, 2002.
Joint Task Force 622	JTF 622	AUS	Operation VIC FIRE ASSIST
Joint Task Force 627	JTF 627	AUS	SUBmarine Search And Rescue (SUBSAR) May be designator for Commander Australian Fleet; CTF 627 was allocated to this officer under his previous title of Maritime Commander Australia in 1999–2000.
Joint Task Force 629	JTF 629	AUS	2004: Operation Sumatra Assist - ADF response to the earthquake in Sumatra, Indonesia. 2005: Operation Sumatra Assist II - ADF response to further earthquakes in Sumatra. 2009: Operation Padang Assist - the ADF response to earthquakes in Padang, Indonesia. At the same time in 2009 as the Padang earthquake, an earthquake and tsunami hit Samoa and the JTF 629 designation extended to the operation in that region, Operation Samoa Assist. 2017-19: Operation Augury-Philippines - the ADF training mission to the Armed Forces of the Philippines in support of their counter terror operations.
Joint Task Force 630	JTF 630	AUS	Op Larry Assist after Cyclone Larry, March 2006. Commander was Mick Slater.
Joint Task Force 631	JTF 631	AUS	Operation Astute – Timor Leste International Stabilisation Force
Joint Task Force 632	JTF 632	AUS	Operation Pakistan Assist (2005-6) - the ADF response to earthquake disaster relief in Pakistan. The TF632 designation was later used for a Special Operations group in Iraq in 2018.
Joint Task Force 633	JTF 633	AUS	Operation Okra, HQJTF 633, based in the United Arab Emirates, provides command and control of all ADF elements deployed throughout the Middle East Area of Operations (MEAO) as part of Operation Slipper. JTF 633 is commanded by Major General Craig Orme. Previous commanders have included MAJGEN Stuart Smith. Included Security Detachment Iraq
Joint Task Force 634	JTF 634	AUS	Supported 2007 Sydney APEC Conference. Commander: Brigadier Andrew Smith, Cdr 7th Brigade.
Combined Task Force 635	CTF 635	AUS	Operation Anode, the ADF led support mission to RAMSI Between 2003 and 2017. CTF 635 incorporated elements of the NZDF and participating pacific nations as well as the ADF and AFP.
Joint Task Force 636	JTF 636	AUS	2010: Operation Pakistan Assist II - ADF disaster relief operation in Pakistan following flooding and landslide events. 2014-15: Operation Highroad - ADF operations in Afghanistan until June 6, 2015, when it transitioned to the downsized Task Group Afghanistan.
Joint Task Force 637	JTF 637	AUS	2007: Operation Kiribati Assist; 2011: Operation Queensland Flood Assist; 2019: South West Pacific and Timor Leste defence engagement mission
Joint Task Force 638	JTF 638	AUS	Operation Landscape - 2013 ADF support to expansion of offshore immigration detention facilities on Manus Island, PNG. Included HMAS Choules, elements of 6 Brigade, 1 AOSS and 381 ECSS.
Joint Task Force 639	JTF 639	AUS	Operation Resolute - The ongoing ADF support to Maritime Border Command, a joint command of the ADF and Australian Border Force tasked with protecting Australia's maritime borders.
Joint Task Force 641	JTF 641	AUS	Operation Outreach - ADF support to the 2007 Northern Territory National Emergency Response
Joint Task Force 643	JTF 643	AUS	During Operation Gold, the ADF support to the 2000 Summer Olympics, the JTF 643 designation was assigned to at least part the counter terror force, consisting of elements of SASR, 5th Aviation Regiment and 4 RAR (Commando). The designation may have continued to be used by one of the Australian ready CT Tactical Assault Groups beyond the scope of the 2000 Olympics.
Joint Task Force 644	JTF 644	AUS	During Operation Gold, the ADF support to the 2000 Summer Olympics, the JTF 644 designation was assigned to at least part the counter terror force, consisting of elements of SASR, 5th Aviation Regiment and 4 RAR (Commando). The designation has continued to be used by unconfirmed elements of SOCOMD with the Officer Commanding JTF 644 in 2014, identified only as "Major P" receiving the Conspicuous Service Medal in the 2016 Australia Day Honours.
Joint Task Force 645	JTF 645	AUS	Commander INTERFET, 1999 (TF 645), CHOGM 2001, CHOGM 2002
Task Force 646	TF 646	AUS	RAAF Air Command Aerospace Operational Support Group TG 646.7. In 2019 the JTF 646 designation was used for the ADF response to the bushfires in the Australian state of Victoria, which included elements from the PNG Defence Force and the Fijian military.
Joint Task Force 658	JTF 658	AUS	2014; designation given to the ADF led task force involved for the search for missing airliner MH370. 2019; used for the task force assigned to Operation North Queensland Flood Assist
Joint Task Force 659	JTF 659	AUS	ADF support during 2018 in the aftermath of Tropical Cyclone Marcus in the Northern Territory.
Joint Task Force 661	JTF 661	AUS	ADF support during 2017 for Operation Queensland Assist in the aftermath of Tropical Cyclone Debbie. In 2019 the designation was assigned to Operation Indo-Pacific Endeavour, a military outreach mission with regional neighbours.
Joint Task Force 662	JTF 662	AUS	ADF support during the 2009 Victorian Black Saturday bushfires.
Joint Task Force 663	JTF 663	AUS	Operation Render Safe 2011. HMAS Gascoyne, HMAS Diamantina, HMNZS Resolution (A14), HMNZS Wellington.
Joint Task Force 664	JTF 664	AUS	Operation Yasi Assist
Joint Task Force 665	JTF 665	AUS	Operation Testament, ADF commitment to World Youth Day 2008, Commander Brigadier David Saul
Combined Joint Task Force 667	CJTF 667	AUS	The joint Australian/US force during the 2019 iteration of Exercise Talisman Saber.
Task Force 714	TF 714	US	United States Special Operations Command. Designation for JSOC high-value targets task force in Iraq and Afghanistan during General Stanley McChrystal's time in command.
Joint Task Force 728	TF 728	US	Established in mid-1966 under Lieutenant General Alfred Starbird, Director, Defense Communications Agency, to build the McNamara Line barrier between North and South Vietnam.
Task Force 825	TF 825	Spain	Task Group 825.1 was the Spanish aircraft carrier Principe de Asturias task group in May 2008.
Joint Task Force 950	JTF 950	US	Commander, United States Second Fleet whilst in a training role.
Task Force 976	TF 976	Thailand	Thai Humanitarian Assistance Task Force 976 Thai-Iraq, 2003–2004
Task Force 1099		US	Alias for Task Force 121.

== Named joint task forces ==
Joint Task Force Shining Hope; Joint Task Force Eagle Vista (1998 Presidential African visit)

Joint task force	Abbrev.	Who	Notes
Joint Task Force-Alaska	JTF-AK	US	
Joint Task Force-Armed Forces Inaugural Committee	JTF-AFIC	US	
Joint Task Force Aztec Silence		US	
Joint Task Force Bravo	JTF-B	US	Central America operations from Soto Cano Air Base, Honduras
Joint Task Force Caring Response		US	
Joint Task Force Central		CAN	
Joint Task Force-Civil Support	JTF-CS	US	
Joint Task Force East		US	
Joint Task Force for Elimination	JTF-E	US	Joint Task Force for Elimination of WMD (JTF-E)
Joint Task Force Empire Shield	JTF-ES	US	
Joint Task Force Full Accounting		US	
Joint Task Force Gator		US	
Joint Task Force-Global Network Operations	JTF-GNO	US	Critical infrastructure protection. (Evolved from JTF-CND, then JTF-CNO)
Joint Task Force Gold	JTF Gold	AUS	2000 Summer Olympics
Joint Task Force Guantanamo	JTF-GTMO	US	See also The Wire (JTF-GTMO) – Weekly publication published by Joint Task Force Guantanamo
Joint Task Force Haiti		US	
Joint Task Force-Homeland Defense	JTF-HD	US	
Combined Joint Task Force – Horn of Africa	CJTF-HOA	US	
Joint Task Force Katrina		US	
Joint Task Force Lebanon	JTF-L	US	
Joint Task Force Liberia	JTF Liberia	US	
Joint Task Force National Capital Region/Medical	JTF CapMed	US	
Joint Task Force (North)	JTF(N)	CAN	
Joint Task Force North		US	
Joint Task Force OMEGA	JTF OMEGA	Colombian Armed Forces	JTF in support of US funded Plan Patriota
Joint Task Force Southwest Asia	JTF-SWA	US	The JTF commander also commanded 9th Aerospace Expeditionary Task Force-Southwest Asia, U.S. Central Command, Riyadh, Saudi Arabia. It carried out Operation Southern Watch to enforce the Iraqi no-fly zones. The 9AETF-SWA was the forward-deployed arm of the Ninth Air Force. Established on August 26, 1992; active until 2003.
Joint Task Force-Space Defense	JTF-SD	US	The JTF-SD was established by USSPACECOM on October 21, 2019.
Joint Task Force Rita		US	
Joint Task Force Operation United Assistance	JTF-OUA	US	2014 US military mission to help combat Ebola virus epidemic in Liberia.

== United States Army and other non-USMCEB task forces ==
These included Combined Joint Task Force 76, Combined Joint Task Force 82, and Combined Joint Task Force 180.

Task force	Abbrev.	Who	Notes
Task Force 1-37 Armor	TF 1-37 ARM	Heavy battalion mechanized task force formed around units of the 1st Battalion, 37th Armor Regiment, 1st Armored Division (United States). It fought at the Battle of Medina Ridge during the 1991 Gulf War.	
Task Force 1-41 Infantry	TF 1-41 INF	US	U.S. Army combined-arms heavy battalion mechanized Task Force consisting primarily of the 1st Battalion, 41st Infantry Regiment, 3rd Battalion, 66th Armor Regiment, and the 4th Battalion, 3rd Field Artillery Regiment all being part of the 2nd Armored Division (Forward). It served at the Battle of 73 Easting and the Battle of Norfolk. Formed in various other incarnations during other conflicts.
Task Force 6-26	TF 6-26	US– USSOCOM or JSOC task force	
Task Force 77		US	See Joint Special Operations Command Task Force in the Iraq War
Combined Joint Task Force 82	CJTF-82	US	
Special Operations Task Force 103	SOTF-103	US	On 11 May 2010, Malian and Senegalese soldiers worked on small unit tactics, movements, and convoy vehicle recover drills with special operations forces personnel from Special Operations Task Force 103 in Bamako, Mali. The classes were part of Exercise Flintlock 10, an exercise focused on military interoperability and capacity-building, which was part of an AFRICOM-sponsored annual exercise program with partner nations in northern and western Africa. Flintlock 10, which includes participation of key European U.S. allies, was conducted by SOCAFRICA and was designed to build relationships and develop capacity among security forces throughout the Trans-Saharan region of Africa.
Task Force 118	TF-118	US	a regular army aviation unit flying AH-58D Warrior helicopters whose mast-mounted IR sights helped spot small boats during Operation Prime Chance
Task Force 121		US	See Joint Special Operations Command Task Force in the Iraq War
Task Force 145		US	See Joint Special Operations Command Task Force in the Iraq War
Task Force ALBA		Swiss	Humanitarian operation in Albania during 1999.
Task Force Aegis		US	Redirects to Combined Joint Task Force 76
Task Force Alpha		UK	Redirects to 7th Armoured Brigade (United Kingdom)
Task Force Baum		US	Concentration camp rescue force "set up by U.S. Army general George S. Patton"
Task Force Bayonet		US	Task Force Bayonet (disambiguation)
Task Force Black		US	Redirects to Task Force 88 (anti-terrorist unit)
Task Force Blue		US	United States Navy SEALs
Task Force Danbi		South Korea	Haiti earthquake relief 2010
Task Force Eagle		NATO	IFOR
Task Force East		US	US European Command initiative to strengthen relationships with Eastern European allies
Task Force Faith		US	US Army unit during the Korean War
Task Force Falcon (US)		US	US Army Task Force serving as part of KFOR in Kosovo
Task Force Frigid		US	After World War II, the War Department decided that U.S. Army personnel must be able to live and operate in any degree of cold. A group of task forces was therefore organized to test U.S. Army equipment in the cold. Task Force Frigid and Task Force Williwaw were dispatched to what is now Fort Greely, Alaska during the winters of 1946 and 1947.
Task Force Harvest		NATO	Operation Essential Harvest
Task Force Hawk		US	Kosovo
Task Force Helmand		NATO	Part of ISAF in Helmand Province, Afghanistan
Task Force K-Bar		US	"The first major ground deployment in the US-led invasion of Afghanistan"
Task Force Kandahar		NATO	ISAF in Kandahar, Afghanistan
Task Force Kean		UN	North Korea
Task Force Leatherneck		US	Located at Camp Leatherneck, Helmand Province, Afghanistan. Marine Air-Ground Task Force currently operating in Helmand Province. 2nd Marine Expeditionary Brigade during 2009–10 for Operation Enduring Freedom. Also used by the 1st and 2nd Marine Divisions during their deployments to Afghanistan
Task Force Libeccio		CAN	Operation Mobile#Royal Canadian Air Force – 2011 military intervention in Libya.
Task Force Lightning		US	25th Infantry Division (United States)
Task Force Manchu		US	Second Battle of Naktong Bulge#The end of Task Force Manchu
Task Force Mustang		US	Combat Aviation Brigade, 36th Infantry Division, Texas Army National Guard
Task Force ODIN		US	US Army aviation battalion created to combat improvised explosive devices in Iraq
Task Force Phoenix	CJTF Phoenix	US	Initially organized by CENTCOM to train and mentor the newly created Afghan National Security Forces
Task Force Ranger		US	Battle of Mogadishu (1993)#The August killings and the deployment of Task Force Ranger
Task Force Scorpio		Swiss	Biological and chemical response team activated during the first Gulf War - not deployed
Task Force Shield		US/UK/Iraq	Set up in 2003 to provide security for Iraq's critical oil infrastructure
Task Force Sinai		US	U.S. element of Multinational Force and Observers (MFO)
Task Force Smith		US	Battle of Osan#Task Force Smith
Task Force Tarawa		US	The 2nd Marine Expeditionary Brigade during the 2003 invasion of Iraq
Task Force Taro		US	3rd Marine Regiment (United States)
Task Force Trinity		US	3rd Battalion 3rd Marines
Task Force Tripoli		US	USMC air ground task force formed after the fall of Baghdad during the 2003 invasion of Iraq
Task Force Uruzgan		Netherlands	Part of NATO's Regional Command South, ISAF, Afghanistan. Significant Australian Army linkages.
Task Force Viking		US	Combined Joint Special Operations Task Force – North (CJSOTF–N), also known as Task Force Viking, was the U.S. joint task force responsible for the northern front during the initial period of the 2003 invasion of Iraq
Task Force White Eagle		Poland	A brigade sized detachment of Polish Land Forces in Ghazni Province, Afghanistan. The brigade was under the command of the US 1st Cavalry Division.

== Others ==
- Task Force for Business and Stability Operations – U.S. Department of Defense commercial facilitation organization, not a military operational task force.

== See also ==
- Taskforce (disambiguation)

== Sources ==
- "The Development of Unified Command Structure for the U. S. Armed Forces, 1945-1950," p. 11-21 in Ronald H. Cole, et al., The History of Unified Command 1946–1993 (Washington, DC: Joint History Office of the Office of the Chairman of the Joint Chiefs of Staff, 1995)
- History.navy.mil (1945). "United States Pacific Fleet Organization, 1 May 1945". History.navy.mil.
- Norman Polmar, Ships and Aircraft of the U.S. Fleet, Naval Institute Press, see 11th Edition, 1978, pp. 6–9; 13th Edition, 1984, pp. 14–17; 14th Edition, 1987, pp. 15–19; 2005 edition.
- Puryear, Edgar F. (1983). George S. Brown, General, U.S. Air Force: Destined for Stars. Novato, California: Presidio. ISBN 0-89141-169-0. OCLC 9198011.
- Robinson, Colin D. (January 2020). "The U.S. Navy's task forces: 1–199". Defence and Security Analysis. 36 (1): 109–110. doi:10.1080/14751798.2020.1712028. S2CID 213678034.
- Siegel, Adam B. (August 1996). The Intervasion of Haiti, Professional Paper 539 (PDF). Center for Naval Analyses. p. 12. Archived from the original (PDF) on 2014-04-15.
