= Zabid Zahir =

- Arrested: 2007-12; Sherzad District, Nangarhar; Afghan National Police
- Citizenship: Afghanistan

Zabid Zahir is a citizen of Afghanistan who Afghan security officials assert was the leader of the Hezbi Islami Gulbuddin in Sherzed district. He was captured on late December 2007, in a raid on a "suspected insurgent" safe house in Jalalabad, and two suspected IED facilitators. Zahir was believed to have been behind the smuggling of weapons in the region, and the importation of foreign fighters. At the time of his capture Zahir's son Tahir Omar was a member of the Nangarhar Provincial Council—the Provincial legislature.

== Precapture ==
In January 2007 the Afghan War Diary described Zahir as an influential local elder who had helped celebrate the opening of the Sherzod District Center, which had been built with foreign assistance. According to the diary entry Zahir was the local elder chosen to thank the Provincial Reconstruction Team, and he expressed the hope that the PRT would "do more projects, specifically another micro-hydro and improvements for the local clinic."

== Postcapture ==
According to the information prepared by Combined Joint Task Force 82 and released in the Afghan War Diaries Zahir is the father of a member of Nangarhar's Provincial Council. CJTF 82 described Zahir's son as "fairly influential" council member, and anticipated his capture would have a local political importance. According to the WikiLeaks report Zahir was captured by a detachment from the Afghan National Police, with the "ODA", a unit of American forces standing by to assist. The ODA had been trying to analyze Zahir's social network, prior to his capture. The ODA had assembled a dossier of 25 pages prior to Zahir's capture. The Afghan National Police encountered no resistance during Zahir's capture, and did not find the evidence of insurgent activity they expected.

Al Jazeera reported that a shura convened to meet with the local Provincial Reconstruction Team due to controversy surrounding Zahir's capture. According to Al Jazeera, at the meeting, a US officer told Fazalhadi Muslimyar, the chair of the shura, Zahir was a "bad person", and warned the Provincial Governor and Council that "we will lose all confidence in their claim that the [Afghan government] can sufficiently take responsibility for insurgents/criminals". Al Jazeera reported that Zahir's son and Muslimyar were political opponents, and that Zahir's son had initiated a motion of no-confidence against Muslimyar. They reported that Muslimyar said he had been won over to the US view of Zahir during the shura.
