= Combined Joint Task Force 76 =

Combined Joint Task Force – 76 (CJTF-76) was a US led subordinate formation of Combined Forces Command – Afghanistan (CFC-A) headquartered in Kabul, Afghanistan. It was active from the time CFC-A stood up (circa 15 April 2004) to the time the International Security Assistance Force (ISAF) took full command of the coalition military operations in Afghanistan in October 2006. CFC-A reported in its turn to United States Central Command. While CFC-Afghanistan was supposed to have inactivated sometime after November 30, 2006, CJTF-76 remained as a headquarters for ISAF's Regional Command East. CJTF-76 was replaced by Combined Joint Task Force 82, led by the 82nd Airborne Division, in the middle of 2007.

CJTF-76 was located at Bagram Airfield. On 15 April 2004 the headquarters of the U.S. Army's 25th Infantry Division arrived in Afghanistan and took command of CJTF-180 from the 10th Mountain Division. Lieutenant General David Barno, commanding then decided to rename the CJTF because the "180" designation had traditionally been given to Joint task forces led by the Army's XVIII Airborne Corps. Barno chose Combined Joint Task Force 76 as the new name to evoke America's history and the democratic spirit of 1776. The CFC-A commander was hoping that this new designation would highlight the change in command at the operational level at a time when Afghanistan appeared to be moving closer to democracy.

CJTF-76 was the operational headquarters which consisted of two subordinate regional formations: Regional Command South and Regional Command East. The regional commands, both roughly brigade sized forces, conducted counter-insurgency operations against Taliban and Al-Qaeda in the east and south of the country. The Task Force and its subordinate formations comprised a shifting group of units and formations. There were also engineer and special operations Task Forces, plus the Provincial Reconstruction Teams. At the time of the ISAF take over, CJTF-76 was commanded by Maj. Gen. Benjamin Freakley of the U.S. 10th Mountain Division (Light Infantry).

The mission of CJTF-76 was to conduct a 'full spectrum of operations throughout its operations area to defeat [the] enemy extremist movement, establish an enduring security and reshape its posture for the Long War in order to set conditions for long-term stability in Afghanistan.'

As of mid 2006, US official sources stated that over 21,000 coalition forces from 21 nations were deployed in Afghanistan to 'defeat extremist enemies of peace and stability'.

== Regional Command (East) ==
Regional Command East (RC (E)) was responsible for provincial reconstruction team and security in Asadabad, Bamian, Gardez, Ghazni, Jalalabad, Khowst, Parwan, Mehtar Lam and Sharona. RC(E) also had responsibility for conducting operations against the Taliban on the Pakistani border.

Task Force Spartan (March 2006 to May 2007) was a US led task force in the central and eastern regions of Afghanistan. TF Spartan was made up of the 3rd Brigade Combat Team from 10th Mountain Division (Light Infantry) and 1/3 Marines. TF Spartan fell under CJTF-76/RC East.

Task Force Bayonet (June 2007 to September 2008) is comprised primarily by soldiers of the 173rd Airborne Brigade Combat Team based in Vicenza, Italy. TF Bayonet initially fell under CJTF-76 until the headquarters was redesignated as CJTF-82.

== Regional Command (South) ==
Regional Command (South) was responsible for provincial reconstruction and security in Kandahar, Lashkar Gah, Qalat and Tarin Kowt.

=== Task Force Bayonet (February 2005 to March 2006) ===
Task Force Bayonet was comprised primarily by soldiers of the 173rd Airborne Brigade Combat Team based in Vicenza, Italy.

Task Force Bayonet (Feb '05 to March '06) included:

- TF Gun Devil (US) – Kandahar (3-319th AFA with Company D, 2–504th PIR; Company B, 1–508th PIR; Company A, 1-325th AIR; a military police platoon (4th PLT 13th MP Co.); a company from 3 PPCLI, Canadian, Camp Nathan Smith (PRT), a rotating Romanian mechanized infantry battalion; and an Afghan National Army company advised by French special forces
- TF Rock (US) – 2-503rd Infantry Battalion (Airborne) – Qalat
- TF Whiteshark (Rom) – Kandahar Airfield

=== Combined Task Force Aegis (March 2006 to August 2006) ===
CTF Aegis was a multinational task force led by Canada in southeast Afghanistan. Contributing nations include the United Kingdom, the Netherlands (contributing Task Force Uruzgan), Estonia and the United States. TF Aegis was also known as Multinational Brigade - Regional Command South or MNB RC South. In August 2006, CTF Aegis transferred to the control of ISAF.

Task Force Aegis included, as of May 2006:

- TF Helmand (UK) – 3rd Battalion, the Parachute Regiment - Helmand
- TF Orion (CDN) – 1st Battalion, the Princess Patricia's Canadian Light Infantry Battlegroup - Kandahar
- TF Knighthawk (US) - 2-10 Aviation Regt, 10th Aviation Brigade, 10th Mountain Division
- TF Warrior (US) – 2-4 Inf Battalion, 10th Mountain Division)- Qalat
- TF Whiteshark (Romania) – 141st Inf Battalion
- Task Force Uruzgan(Dutch) - Uruzgan

== Post Handover to ISAF ==
With the concurrence of the Commander, U.S. Central Command, and upon the inactivation of HQ CFC-A, Headquarters CJTF-76 will become the United States National Command Element for the Afghanistan Combined Joint Operations Area (CJOA). The Commander of CJTF-76 will also be the regional commander of Regional Command East (RC-East).

The Commander, Joint Task Force-76 Maj. Gen. Benjamin Freakley will be dual-hatted as the U.S. operational commander and the NATO/ISAF deputy commander for security. This hopefully will ensure proper coordination.

Major General Freakley, briefing journalists by video link from Afghanistan on January 26, 2007, said: "On October the 6th, Afghanistan completed its transition from the United States-led coalition to a NATO-led coalition headed by the International Security Assistance Force. Over the last two years, ISAF has assumed responsibility for security operations in five different provinces or regional commands: Center, North, West, South and now Regional Command East, which we command, which has 14 different provinces... As mentioned, [ Lieutenant General Karl Eikenberry left and] just five days ago, all of us came under ISAF for the counterinsurgency. Finally, early next month, the International Security Assistance Force will conduct the transition of authority from the United Kingdom lead under General Richards to the United States Command under General McNeill. Today Combined Joint Task Force-76, as mentioned, is the senior headquarters in Afghanistan, and we, too, are approaching a transition for next week"—when CJTF 76 will be relieved by Combined Joint Task Force 82 led by the 82nd Airborne Division.
