= Mohammed Tahir Omar =

Tahir Omar
- Occupation: Provincial legislator

Tahir Omar is a citizen of Afghanistan who served in the Nangarhar Provincial Council. Omar's father Zabid Zahir was an influential elder in Sherzad District.

== Controversy ==
According to Al Jazeera Omar had tried to pass a motion of no confidence against Fazalhadi Muslimyar. Omar's father Zahir was subsequently denounced and captured in late December 2007, and handed over to US forces, and described as the local leader of the Hezbi Islami Gulbuddin. By February 2008 however the coalition forces radio was merely accusing Omar and Zahir of corruption.
