= Joint Task Force Bravo =

Joint Task Force-Bravo
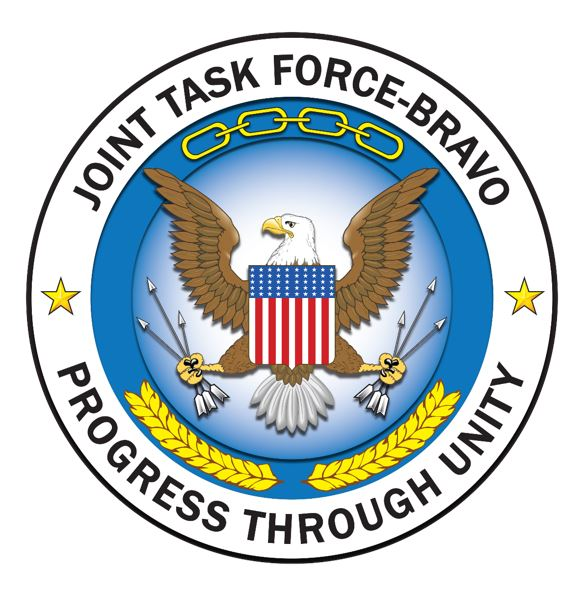
- Active: 1983–present
- Countries: Belize; Costa Rica; El Salvador; Guatemala; Honduras; Nicaragua; Panama; United States
- Allegiance: United States
- Type: Joint task force
- Part of: United States Southern Command
- Garrison/HQ: Soto Cano Air Base
- Motto: "Progress Through Unity."
- Decorations: Joint Meritorious Unit Award (8)
- Website: Joint Task Force-Bravo

Commanders
- Current commander: COL David A. Webb

Joint Task Force-Bravo (JTF-Bravo, JTF-B) is a forward-based expeditionary joint task force operating as U.S. Southern Command's (USSOUTHCOM) lead forward element in the Central America (CENTAM) region to promote stability and security and counter transnational and transregional threat networks (C-T3N). JTF-Bravo operates out of Soto Cano Air Base, Honduras, located 10 miles south of the city of Comayagua and 50 miles north of the capital city of Tegucigalpa.

== Overview ==
JTF-Bravo conducts a wide range of continuous and simultaneous operations. The organization's primary authority, as directed by the United States Secretary of Defense, is to synchronize and conduct operations, activities, and actions in support of US and partner nation law enforcement agencies in order to counter drugs and transnational organized crime (CD/CTOC). In addition, the JTF supports the USSOUTHCOM Theater Security Cooperation campaign plan to counter threat networks and promote regional cooperation and security in the Caribbean, Central America, and South America by organizing and supporting multilateral, capacity-building exercises in cooperation with partner nations. Due to its enduring forward presence and management of a forward, all-weather, day/night strategic air base, the JTF is often employed as the first responder for contingencies and crises within the region, especially in support of Foreign Humanitarian Assistance/Disaster Relief (FHA/DR) operations.

== Mission ==
JTF-Bravo, as guests of Honduran host nation partners and the senior representatives for USSOUTHCOM at Soto Cano Air Base, maintains a forward presence and conducts and supports joint operations, activities, and investments throughout the Joint Operations Area in order to enhance regional security, stability, and cooperation.

== Area of Operations ==
The USSOUTHCOM commander has assigned a seven nation Joint Operations Area (JOA) to JTF-Bravo. The JOA includes the land, air, and maritime (out to 12 nautical miles) area of all seven nations of Central America: Belize, Guatemala, El Salvador, Honduras, Nicaragua, Costa Rica, and Panama. When directed by USSOUTHCOM, the JTF has conducted operations outside the JOA, most recently in support of relief efforts in the Leeward Islands following Hurricane Irma and Maria.

== Organization ==
JTF-Bravo is composed of a joint headquarters and five major subordinate commands which include the following:

- 1st Battalion, 228th Aviation Regiment (1-228th Aviation) provides heavy vertical lift, medical evacuation, general aviation support, and mission command in a semi-permissive environment. The regiment actively participates in counter narcotic, search-and-rescue, and humanitarian assistance/disaster relief missions throughout Central America.
- 612th Air Base Squadron provides air base support to Joint Task Force-Bravo and the 12th Air Force including air traffic control, logistics, base civil engineering, fire department, airfield operations and personnel functions. In addition, the squadron maintains Soto Cano Air Base, the only strategic hub for U.S. operations in Central and South America.
- Army Forces (ARFOR) / Joint Support Battalion provides joint service administrative and logistical support along with rapid response command and control capabilities to contingency operations. Among its roles, the battalion conducts fuel delivery and personnel augmentation, aerial delivery operations, and employs the USSOUTHCOM-Situational Assessment Team (SSAT) which provides a link to lead USG agencies and USSOUTHCOM during initial DoD contingency responses.
- Medical Element (MEDEL) consists of U.S. Army medical personnel from the US Army Reserve, as well as Honduran medical liaisons. The only expeditionary surgical-capable medical unit in Central And South America, MEDEL provides a wide range of health care services to maintain the force health readiness of U.S. personnel. In addition, the MEDEL partners with host nation security forces and medical providers to conduct Medical Readiness Training Exercises (MEDRETEs) throughout Central America.
- Joint Security Force (JSF) consists of bilingual military police from the U.S. Air Force and U.S. Army Puerto Rico National Guard. The JSF is organized, trained and equipped to provide security, law enforcement, anti-terrorism and expeditionary force protection to U.S. forces anywhere within Central America.

In addition to assigned commands, the JTF also assumes tactical control of, or supporting relationships with, other DoD forces when they operate within Central America including U.S. Army regionally aligned forces and U.S. Marine Special-Purpose Marine Air-Ground Task Forces (SP-MAGTFs).

== History ==
=== 1980s – Countering Soviet and communist influence ===
In the early 1980s, the United States looked to counter spreading communism and growing Soviet influence in Central America. In 1982, Honduran authorities began negotiations with the U.S. to grant access to naval and air facilities. By 1983, the United States was expanding the airfield at Palmerola Air Force Base (later renamed Enrique Soto Cano Air Base) which included a US Special Forces Regional Military Training Center. That year Congress authorized the creation of a joint task force based out of the air base to command and control the various exercises and training missions being conducted throughout Central America, primarily to counter Soviet or communist activities in Nicaragua and Honduras. Originally established as Joint Task Force-11, the organization was briefly renamed Joint Task Force Alpha (JTF-A) to avoid confusion with the similarly named U.S. Navy Task Force 11 that operated during World War II. Finally designated JTF-Bravo and assigned to U.S. Southern Command, the organization supported U.S. security efforts in Central America including training and advisory support for Honduran and Guatemalan armed forces and some indirect support for Nicaraguan Contras. Low Intensity Conflict (LIC doctrine) operations included improving in-country logistics support and infrastructure improvements building roads and ports while also providing Army engineering units training unavailable in Conus. Support of Honduran Forces included repelling Nicaraguan forces that invaded the Honduran Las Vegas Salient in 1987 and again in 1988. See Operation Golden Pheasant. By 1987, JTF-Bravo had over 1,000 assigned personnel.

=== 1990s–2000s – Countering Drugs and Humanitarian Assistance ===
As regional wars subsided and the Soviet threat dissolved in the late-1980s, the threat of narco-trafficking expanded dramatically. The DoD responded by refocusing JTF-Bravo to provide support to U.S. and partner nation law enforcement agency counter drug operations. Furthermore, in order to reinforce the efforts of Central American nations recovering from the violence of the previous decade, the JTF was employed to provide a "soft power" approach by providing humanitarian assistance in the region. Throughout the 1990s and 2000s, JTF-Bravo responded to dozens of crises and contingencies throughout Central America. In the aftermath of Hurricane Mitch in 1998, JTF-Bravo played a vital role in civilian search and rescue efforts as well as supporting host governments' post-disaster recovery operations. Other examples of humanitarian aid rendered by JTF-Bravo include relief missions responding to Hurricane Stan in Guatemala in October 2005, Hurricane Beta and Hurricane Gamma in Honduras in November 2005, a medical mission to León, Nicaragua in September 2006 in response to widespread alcohol poisoning, and a relief effort in response to massive flooding in Colón, Panama in November 2006. In August 2007 JTF Bravo dispatched teams to Peru in response to an 8.0 magnitude earthquake. JTF-Bravo also sent a team to Belize following Hurricane Dean. In September a teams was sent to aid Honduras and Nicaragua following Hurricane Felix. In September 2008, JTF-Bravo sent a team of medical professionals to the border of Costa Rica and Panama to participate in a three-day medical readiness exercise. While in November of that year a team was dispatched to assist with flood relief in Costa Rica and Panama. In January 2009 members from JTF-B returned to Costa Rica and in conjunction with USAID assisted with relief and recovery efforts following a 6.1 magnitude earthquake. Recent humanitarian projects have included medical readiness exercises in the Mosquita Coast of Honduras and Nicaragua, as well as in Costa Rica. JTF-Bravo has also supported firefighting efforts in Tela, Honduras and in the Darien Province, Panama, and assisted humanitarian efforts in Haiti following Hurricane Matthew.

=== 2016–Present – Countering Transnational and Transregional Threat Networks (C-T3N) ===
In response to the current operational environment in CENTAM, USSOUTHCOM developed a "network based approach" to counter transnational and transregional threat networks and stop threats before they reach US borders, destabilize partners, or undermine security of the Western Hemisphere. Seeking to defeat a network with a network, the approach centers on using non-threat networks (military, interagency, partner nation, civil, etc.) to oppose illicit networks. Shifting away from a commodity-based focus (e.g. drugs), the approach focuses on operations, actions, and activities to defeat the networks that facilitate the movement of these commodities. Based on JTF-Bravo's unique posture as the only forward deployed operational headquarters in the USSOUTHCOM area of responsibility combined with its three decades of relationship-building activities, the USSOUTHCOM commander designated the JTF as the regional synchronizer for all C-T3N efforts in Central America. In 2016, JTF-Bravo developed a weekly Community of Interest forum that currently brings together over 700 stakeholders from across the U.S. government to share information and intelligence, expand understanding and awareness about all network activities, and coordinate how US and partner nation activities will counter illicit operations.

In November 2020, JTF-Bravo again participated in Central American rescue and disaster relief operations in the aftermath of Hurricanes Eta and Iota.

== Decorations ==
Ribbon	Award	Year
	Joint Meritorious Unit Award	Aug 1984 – Jul 1987
	Joint Meritorious Unit Award	Jan – Dec 1989
	Joint Meritorious Unit Award	Oct 1994 – Sept 1995
	Joint Meritorious Unit Award	Oct 1995 – Sept 1997
	Joint Meritorious Unit Award	Oct 1997 – Feb 1999
	Joint Meritorious Unit Award	Jan 2007 – Jan 2009
	Joint Meritorious Unit Award	Jul 2014 – Jul 2016
	Joint Meritorious Unit Award	Jul 2016 – Jul 2018
