= Joint Elimination Coordination Element =

Joint Elimination Coordination Element (JECE) is a staff element of United States Strategic Command (USSTRATCOM) with the mission of integrating WMD Elimination doctrine into operational plans and joint doctrine, augmenting an existing headquarters to provide elimination planning and command and control expertise, and forming the core of a Joint Task Force for Elimination of WMD (JTF-E).

The JECE reached initial operational capability in April 2008 and was created by USSTRATCOM as a result of a 2006 Quadrennial Defense Review (QDR) requirement for a "deployable Joint Task Force headquarters for WMD elimination to be able to provide immediate command and control of forces for executing those missions." In the 2010 QDR the Secretary of Defense directed the establishment of a "standing Joint Task Force Elimination Headquarters. In order to better plan, train, and execute WMD-elimination operations, the Department is establishing a standing Joint Task Force Elimination Headquarters with increased nuclear disablement, exploitation, intelligence, and coordination capabilities." The JECE may augment a headquarters along j-code functional lines or as a cell of elimination expertise such as in Talisman Saber 2009 where they reached Final Operational Capability with limitations. The JECE may also form the core element of a JTF-E headquarters as they have performed in Key Resolve and Ulchi-Freedom Guardian exercises in conjunction with the Army's 20th Support Command (CBRNE) headquarters.

== See also ==
- Joint Publication 3-40 (JP 3-40)
- Joint Task Force for Elimination of WMD (JTF-E)
- Elimination doctrine
