= Michael L. Oates =

United States Army general

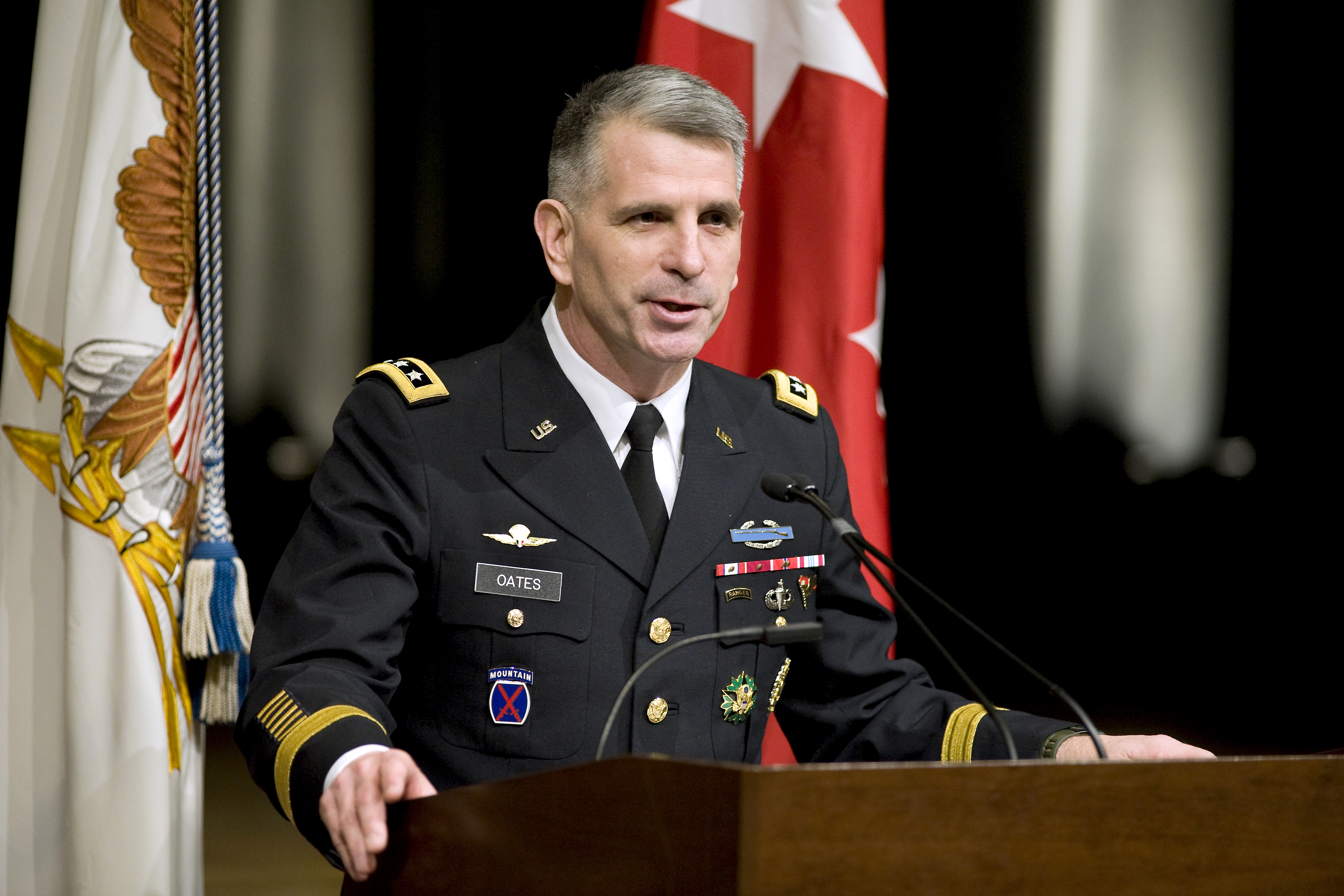
- Lieutenant General Oates in 2009
- Born: August 29, 1957 (age 69); West Germany
- Military career
- Allegiance: United States
- Branch: United States Army
- Service years: 1979–2011
- Rank: Lieutenant General
- Commands: Joint Improvised Explosive Device Defeat Organization; 10th Mountain Division; 1st Brigade, 101st Airborne Division; 1st Battalion, 22nd Infantry Regiment
- Conflicts: Gulf War; Iraq War
- Awards: Army Distinguished Service Medal (3); Legion of Merit (2); Bronze Star Medal (3)

Michael Lee Oates (born August 29, 1957) is a retired United States Army lieutenant general from San Antonio, Texas. He was commissioned in the Infantry upon graduation from the United States Military Academy in 1979.

== Military career ==
Oates was promoted to lieutenant general on 30 December 2009 and assumed duties as Director, Joint Improvised Explosive Device Defeat Organization.

Oates was born in West Germany and raised in San Antonio, Texas. He is a 1975 graduate of TMI Episcopal. His wife Barbara is from San Angelo, Texas and they have three daughters; Katherine, Elizabeth and Margaret. Oates’ previous assignment was as Commanding General of the 10th Mountain Division (Light Infantry) and Fort Drum and as Commanding General, Multi-National Division (SOUTH), in Iraq.

Oates was commissioned as an infantry officer following his graduation from the United States Military Academy at West Point, New York in 1979. His initial duty assignments included service with the 2nd Battalion, 7th Cavalry, 1st Cavalry Division at Fort Hood, Texas and the 2d Battalion, 187th Infantry (Airborne), Republic of Panama. Subsequent tactical assignments included service with the 3rd Brigade, 101st Airborne Division (Air Assault) at Fort Campbell, Kentucky, and as Commander, 1st Battalion, 22d Infantry, 10th Mountain Division at Fort Drum, New York. Oates later commanded the 1st Brigade, 101st Airborne Division (Air Assault) from 1998 to 2000 and commanded the 10th Mountain Division (Light) from 2007 to 2009.

Oates' non-tactical assignments include service as an Infantry Assignments Officer; Current Operations Officer in the J3, Joint Staff; Executive Officer to Tom White, Secretary of the Army; and as Chief of Staff to Lieutenant General Keith Kellogg, the Chief Operations Officer, Coalition Provisional Authority, Baghdad, Iraq.

Oates holds a master's degree in National Security and Strategic Studies from the United States Naval War College, Newport, Rhode Island. He is a graduate of the Army's Command and General Staff College.

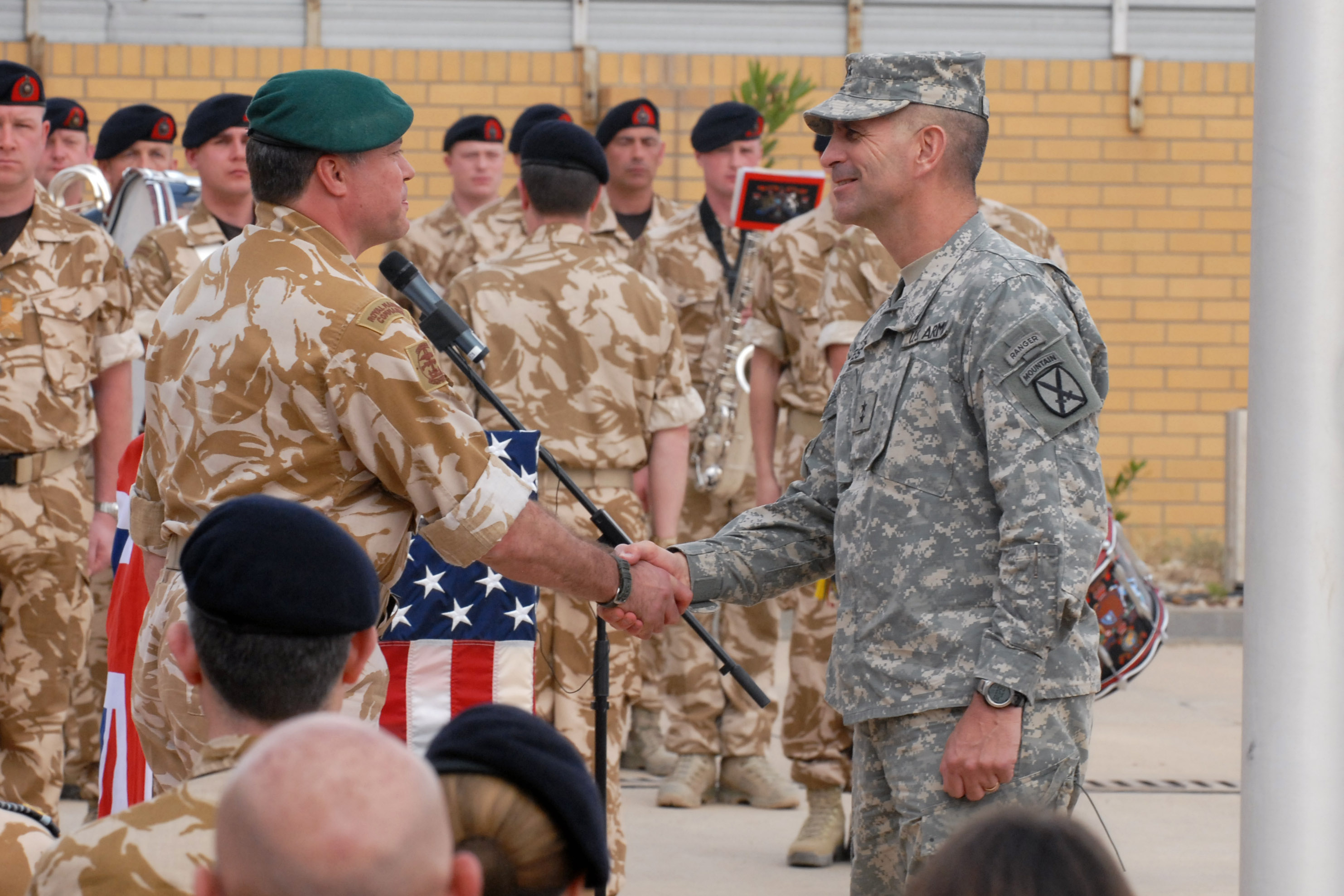
British Major General Andy Salmon (left), Multi-National Division-Southeast commander, and Major General Michael L. Oates (right), MND-South commander, shake hands during the transfer of responsibility ceremony in Basra, Iraq

== Awards and decorations ==
Combat Infantryman Badge
Ranger tab
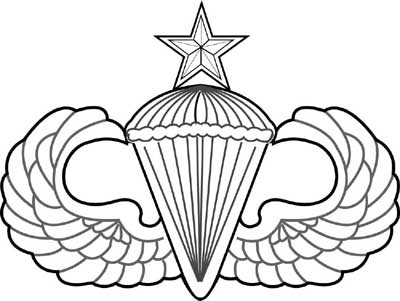
Senior Parachutist Badge
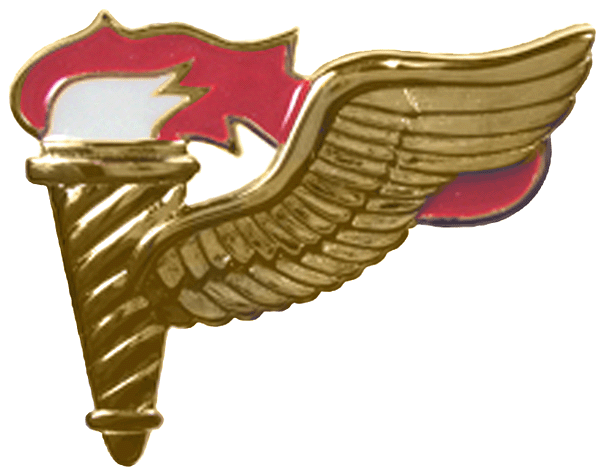
Pathfinder Badge
Air Assault Badge
Joint Chiefs of Staff Identification Badge
Army Staff Identification Badge
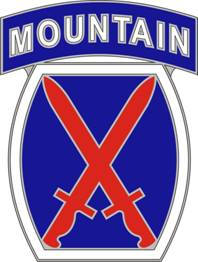
10th Mountain Division Combat Service Identification Badge
Unidentified foreign parachutist badge
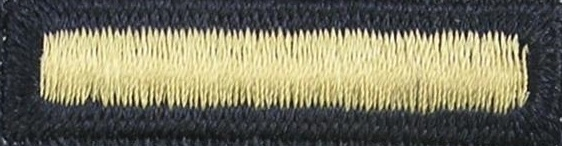
6 Overseas Service Bars

Army Distinguished Service Medal with two bronze oak leaf clusters
Legion of Merit with oak leaf cluster
Bronze Star Medal with two oak leaf clusters
Defense Meritorious Service Medal
Meritorious Service Medal with four oak leaf clusters
Army Commendation Medal with two oak leaf clusters
Meritorious Unit Commendation
National Defense Service Medal with one bronze service star
Southwest Asia Service Medal
Iraq Campaign Medal with four campaign stars
Korea Defense Service Medal
Army Service Ribbon
Army Overseas Service Ribbon
Multinational Force and Observers Medal
Kuwait Liberation Medal (Saudi Arabia)
Kuwait Liberation Medal (Kuwait)

Military offices
Preceded by Benjamin Freakley	Commander, 10th Mountain Division; 2007–2009	Succeeded by James L. Terry
