= Elimination doctrine =

Elimination is one of the eight Weapons of Mass Destruction (WMD) mission areas as outlined by the United States Department of Defense in the 2006 National Military Strategy to Combat WMD and Joint Publication 3-40. "Elimination" is a mission under the Counterproliferation pillar (goal).

== Definition ==
"WMD Elimination operations are operations to systematically locate, characterize, secure, disable, and/or destroy a State or Non-state actor’s WMD programs and related capabilities in hostile or uncertain environments. Elimination operations may be required when offensive operations against WMD targets carry unacceptable risk to the civilian population or U. S. and partner/allied armed forces".

== Priorities ==
"The priority for elimination activities is to reduce or eliminate the threat to the United States and to support military and national objectives. Operational planning and execution for elimination must ensure the safety of U.S. and partner/allied armed forces through 1) security operations to prevent the looting or capture of WMD and related materials; and 2) rendering harmless or destroying of weapons, materials, agents, and delivery systems that pose an immediate or direct threat to U.S. Armed Forces and the civilian population. Intelligence exploitation of program experts, documents, and other media as well as previously secured weapons and material is essential to combating further WMD proliferation and to prevent regeneration of a WMD capability. Once these activities have been accomplished, elimination operations may be transferred, if directed, to other U. S. Government agencies, international agencies, or 23 host nations to continue destruction of WMD programs and to redirect and monitor dual-use industry and expertise capable of regenerating WMD capability".

== Task Levels ==
WMD elimination operations consist of four principal operational level tasks: isolation; exploitation; destruction; and monitoring and redirection. WMD elimination operations may be conducted during any phase of a combatant command's campaign or as an independent operation. That is, the four steps of WMD elimination discussed below may be performed simultaneously at various geographically separate sites. JTF-E activities will require logistics and security to be drawn from resources possibly allocated to ongoing operations. Most non-DOD agencies require a secure environment to support WMD elimination missions. Military planners should consider this when considering site security. In addition, requirements for WMD elimination should be considered when planning or conducting operations in all WMD MMAs.

== See also ==
- Joint Elimination Coordination Element (JECE)
- Joint Task Force for Elimination of WMD (JTF-E)
