= Task force (disambiguation) =

A task force is a group set up to focus on a specific goal.

Task force may also refer to:

- Chevrolet Task Force, a GM line of trucks from 1955-1959
- Falklands Task Force, the United Kingdom military forces assembled to retake the Falkland Islands from Argentina in 1982
- Task Force (hip hop group), a hip hop group from the United Kingdom
- Task Force (film), a 1949 military film about Naval aviation, starring Gary Cooper
- Task Force Games, a game company started in 1979 by Allen Eldridge and Stephen Cole
- Task Force Harrier EX, a vertical scrolling shooter video game for the Sega Genesis
- Task Force Talon, a top-secret U.S. military branch in the 2005 Atari game Act of War: Direct Action
- Task Force X, a fictional organization in DC Comics
- Task Force X (Justice League Unlimited episode), a cartoon
- Task Force 72, an organization of model boat builders
- Task Force 1942, a PC game
- Task Force, an Apple IIGS game by Visual Concepts in 1990
- Einsatzgruppen, death force of Nazi Germany.

== See also ==
- Internet Engineering Task Force, a standards organization
- Internet Research Task Force
- Jewish Task Force, a Kahanist organization in the United States
- Joint Task Force
- Joint Task Force (video game)
