= Task Force 157 =

Covert division of the United States Navy

In 1966, the Navy created Task Force 157 (sometimes Pentagon's Spies) as a covert division to control their clandestine intelligence operations, specifically human intelligence operations (HUMINT).

== History ==
Task Force 157, during the time of its operations, was the United States military's only network of undercover agents that operated abroad using business cover for their operations. The major functions and duties of Task Force 157 involved Soviet vessel movement and nuclear weapon shipments around the world. It also recruited foreign intelligence service agents to infiltrate their respective foreign agencies. The majority of its operating areas are declassified, including Europe and the Mediterranean, the Indian Ocean, the Pacific, and the Far East; however, some of the operations are still classified. Task Force 157 was valuable to the United States government because it was able to operate independently, with accuracy, swiftness and extreme secrecy. The Pentagon found it difficult to maintain control over the agents involved with Task Force 157, and because of this reason, it was disestablished in 1977. The United States government wanted to pursue a clandestine operation unit that was more manageable, but at the same time was able to carry out operations at the same standard as Task Force 157. The Central Intelligence Agency (CIA) failed to fully absorb the missions and agents from Task Force 157; instead, they were spread among the CIA, Defense Intelligence Agency (DIA), Army, Air Force, and Task Force 168. In 1981, the United States Army created the Intelligence Support Activity (ISA) to conduct clandestine operations, and to support military operations. In 1989, only eight years after ISA was established, the United States military terminated the unit and established the USSOCOM.

== Achievements ==
A 1973 declassified activity update outlined the achievements of Task Force 157 from its creation date, to 1973. It was reported that the covert unit issued over 8,000 intelligence reports, with the information being classified as great or moderate value. The human source intelligence report lists the following statistics based on analyst evaluations of one-quarter of the intelligence reports:

- 72% of the reports were of great or moderate value
- 93% of the reports contained intelligence that was being reported for the first time
- 87% of the reports contained valid information

That same year, Task Force 157 identified two crucial choke points in Europe in regards to Soviet warship and merchant vessel movements. During this time, the unit recorded over 20,000 ships, while producing over 40,000 pictures of those ships. This intelligence collection allowed the United States government to have a better understanding of Soviet intentions and relations in Europe and the Arab Nations. During this time, Task Force 157 was able to collect intercepted communications, then translate and report them to the proper agencies. Another major achievement that was reported in the human source intelligence report summarized Iraqi and Soviet naval activities in the Persian Gulf in relation to seaborne arms shipments.

In 1974, a similar declassified activity update explained that production from Task Force 157 had "increased dramatically" over the last four years (1970-1974). Operations during this time had focused in the Leningrad area, Black Sea Ports, Kola Inlet and Soviet involved in the Far East. Members of Task Force 157 were able to enter China and North Korea "nearly 100 times". The purpose of these missions was to collect information, pictures, and any other products of collection of Communist China and North Korean ship construction and naval order of battle. A new Chinese missile-equipped patrol boat was discovered, photographed, and confirmed. Task Force 157 agents were also able to confirm the first North Korean guided missile boat constructed entirely in North Korea.

Don Nielsen, the commander of Task Force 157, wrote a memo to the Director of Naval Intelligence (DNI) in 1975 to dissuade him from dissolving Task Force 157. The purpose of this memo was to offer a solution to the decision to dissolve Task Force 157, and to ensure that the DNI was in full possession of the facts. Nielsen explains that he is in shock that the DNI considered disestablishing the leader in Defense clandestine collection. He also explains that cutting Task Force 157 from the Navy will remove any chances of creating a similar task force in the future. Nielsen describes the units actions as irreplaceable because of the unique methods of collection by unconventional means. Task Force 157 was able to avoid traditional government elicitation techniques by relying on commercial and business operations. Nielsen also highlights the amount of resources, projects, and manpower that would have to be transferred to other portions of the Navy, consistently stating that the reallocation of assets would be more wasteful.

== See also ==
- United States Special Operations Command
- Clandestine operation
