= Task Force Shield =

Task Force Shield was set up by the Coalition Provisional Authority in 2003 to provide security for Iraq's critical oil infrastructure. The task force was originally composed of a small team of American military personnel, contractors from the UK-based firm Erinys International, and Iraqis hired, trained and supervised by Erinys. The Iraqi force trained by Erinys was called the Oil Protection Force (OPF). After the Coalition Provisional Authority transferred control of Iraq to the Interim Government, the OPF became a subordinate element of Iraq's Ministry of Oil. The Ministry of Oil did not renew the Erinys contract. Task Force Shield was disbanded in 2005. In April 2006, the Office of the Special Inspector General for Iraq Reconstruction published a report on the activities of Task Force Shield. The report determined that Task Force Shield was ultimately unsuccessful and found that there were indications of potential fraud.
