= Joint Task Force Aztec Silence =

Joint Task Force Aztec Silence is a United States Department of Defense task force conducting anti-terrorism operations. In testimony before the Senate Armed Services Committee on 1 March 2005, then-United States European Command commander General James L. Jones said:

EUCOM established Joint Task Force AZTEC SILENCE under the Commander of the U.S. Sixth Fleet in December 2003 to counter transnational terrorism in the under-governed areas of Northern Africa and to build closer alliances with those governments. In support of this, U.S. Navy intelligence, surveillance and reconnaissance assets based in Sigonella, Sicily were used to collect and share information with partner nations and their militaries. This robust cooperative ISR effort was augmented by the release of intelligence collected by national assets.

The 'assets' at Sigonella are a rotational squadron of United States Navy P-3 Orions. "In March 2004, P-3 aircraft from this squadron and reportedly operating from the southern Algerian base at Tamanrasset were deployed to monitor and gather intelligence on the movements of Algerian Salafist guerrillas [the GSPC, now known as the Al-Qaeda Organization in the Islamic Maghreb operating in Chad and to provide this intelligence to Chadian forces engaged in combat against the guerrillas." Aztec Silence has also involved Special Operations Command, Europe personnel deploying to Algiers.

== See also ==
- Operation Enduring Freedom - Trans Sahara

== Sources and references ==
- Algeria-Watch. "US-trained forces scour Sahara for terror links". algeria-watch.org.
- Joint Task Force Aztec Silence GlobalSecurity.org
- "United States Department of Defense". defenselink.mil. Archived from the original on July 16, 2005.
- Barbara Starr, US backs Chad against extremists, CNN, March 11, 2004
- - was J1 of Task Force
