= Benjamin Freakley =

American general (born 1953)

Benjamin C. Freakley
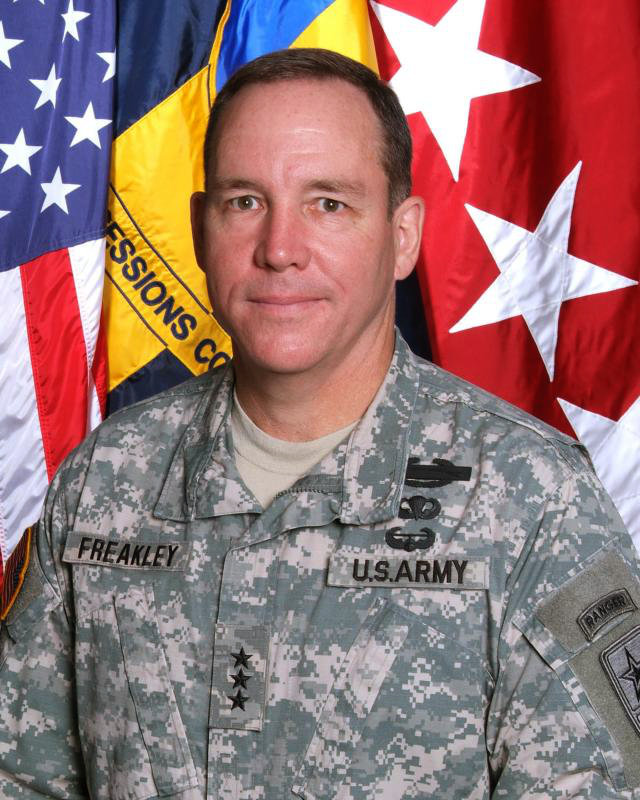
- Benjamin C. Freakley as a lieutenant general
- Born: 21 August 1953 (age 73); Woodstock, Virginia, U.S.
- Spouse: Susan
- Military career
- Allegiance: United States
- Branch: United States Army
- Service years: 1971–2012
- Rank: Lieutenant General
- Units: 101st Airborne Division; National Military Command Center; 3rd Battalion, 7th Infantry Regiment; 24th Infantry Division; 30th Infantry Regiment; Military District of Washington; 506th Infantry Regiment; United States Military Academy
- Commands: United States Army Accessions Command; Combined Joint Task Force 76; 10th Mountain Division; United States Army Infantry School; Operations Group, National Training Center; 3rd Brigade, 1st Cavalry Division; 1st Battalion, 5th Cavalry Regiment
- Conflicts: Gulf War; Iraq War; War in Afghanistan
- Awards: Army Distinguished Service Medal (2); Defense Superior Service Medal (2); Legion of Merit (3); Bronze Star Medal (2)
- Other work: Professor & Policy Advisor, Arizona State University.

Benjamin C. Freakley (born 21 August 1953) is a retired United States Army lieutenant general. From Woodstock, Virginia, Freakley was commissioned as an infantry officer in 1975, and served in Operation Desert Storm, Operation Iraqi Freedom, and Operation Enduring Freedom – Afghanistan before retiring in 2012. After leaving active duty military service, he joined the McCain Institute and Arizona State University.

== Early life ==
Originally from Woodstock, Virginia, he graduated from Central High School in Woodstock in 1971. Freakley also became an Eagle Scout. Applying for admission to two senior military colleges (Virginia Military Institute, The Citadel) and West Point, he ended up graduating from West Point with the Class of 1975.

== Military career ==
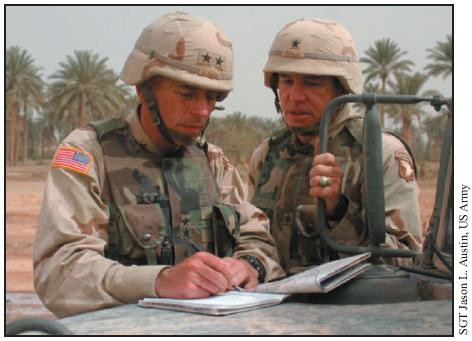
Freakley with Petraeus in 2003

Being commissioned as a second lieutenant of infantry in 1975, he was assigned to the 506th Infantry Regiment until 1979. He then was an aide-de-camp to the commanding general of the Military District of Washington, before being sent to West Germany to serve with the 2nd Battalion, 30th Infantry Regiment. During Operation Desert Shield, Freakley worked on the war plans, and served as battalion executive officer of the 3rd Battalion, 7th Infantry Regiment. Operation Desert Storm found him serving as the operations officer of the 1st Brigade of the 24th Infantry Division.

After Operation Desert Storm, Freakley commanded the 1st Battalion of the 5th Cavalry Regiment, before serving in staff positions with the 24th Infantry Division and III Corps, until being placed in command of the 3rd Brigade of the 1st Cavalry Division. 1999 found Freakley commanding the operations group at Fort Irwin's National Training Center, before serving in staff positions at the National Military Command Center and Joint Staff.

In 2003, Freakley served as assistant division commander, under David Petraeus, of the 101st Airborne Division, which found Freakley involved in combat in Iraq a second time during Operation Iraqi Freedom. After Iraq, Freakley became the Chief of Infantry at Fort Benning, during which time the Infantry Center became part of the Maneuver Center of Excellence.

In 2005, Freakley commanded the 10th Mountain Division as it was deployed to Afghanistan, where he also became the commanding general of Combined Joint Task Force-76. In 2007, Freakley took command of Accessions Command, where he remained until he retired in 2012.

== Post-military career ==
After retiring from the army, Freakley became a professor at Arizona State University, and special advisor to the university's president.

== Awards and decorations ==
Freakley has received the following awards:

Width-44 white ribbon with width-10 scarlet stripes at edges, separated from the white by width-2 ultramarine blue stripes.	Distinguished Service Medal with a bronze Oak leaf cluster
	Defense Superior Service Medal with a bronze Oak leaf cluster
Width-44 crimson ribbon with a pair of width-2 white stripes on the edges	Legion of Merit with two bronze Oak leaf clusters
Width-44 scarlet ribbon with width-4 ultramarine blue stripe at center, surrounded by width-1 white stripes. Width-1 white stripes are at the edges.	Bronze Star Medal with "V" Device and a bronze Oak leaf cluster
Width-44 crimson ribbon with two width-8 white stripes at distance 4 from the edges.	Meritorious Service Medal with one silver Oak leaf cluster and three bronze Oak leaf clusters
Width-44 crimson ribbon with two width-8 white stripes at distance 4 from the edges.	Meritorious Service Medal (second ribbon denoting tenth award)
Width-44 myrtle green ribbon with width-3 white stripes at the edges and five width-1 stripes down the center; the central white stripes are width-2 apart	Army Commendation Medal with "V" Device and a bronze Oak leaf cluster
Width-44 ribbon with two width-9 ultramarine blue stripes surrounded by two pairs of two width-4 green stripes; all these stripes are separated by width-2 white borders	Army Achievement Medal with two bronze Oak leaf clusters
	State Department Meritorious Honor Award
	National Defense Service Medal with two Service stars
	Southwest Asia Service Medal with two Service stars
	Afghanistan Campaign Medal
	Iraq Campaign Medal
	Global War on Terrorism Expeditionary Medal
	Global War on Terrorism Service Medal
	Army Service Ribbon
	Army Overseas Service Ribbon with Numeral 4 device
	NATO Meritorious Service Medal
	NATO Afghanistan service
	Kuwait Liberation Medal
	Kuwait Liberation Medal

Combat Infantryman Badge
Combat Action Badge
Expert Infantryman Badge
Ranger Tab
Parachutist Badge
Air Assault Badge
Joint Chiefs of Staff Identification Badge
10th Mountain Division Combat Service Identification Badge
3 Overseas Service Bars

Freakley was also named the policy leader of the year, by the National Association of State Boards of Education in 2010.

Military offices
Preceded by Lloyd Austin	Commander, 10th Mountain Division; 2005–2007	Succeeded by Michael L. Oates
