= Canadian special forces =

Canadian special forces can refer to:

Canadian Special Operations Forces Command (CANSOFCOM)
The current Canadian military special forces, established 2006
1st Special Service Force, “The Devil's Brigade”
A joint Canada-USA special forces unit of WWII, Canada's first special forces, established 1942 and disbanded 1944
Special Emergency Response Team (SERT)
The Royal Canadian Mounted Police's former special forces team, disbanded 1993
Joint Task Force 2 (JTF2)
A component of CANSOFCOM, and successor to SERT, established 1993
Canadian Special Operations Regiment (CSOR)
provides the CF with a multi dimensional SOF unit that can be deployed anywhere in Canada or internationally. Focussed primarily on special reconnaissance, direct action, and special warfare
The Canadian Airborne Regiment
Sometimes called Canadian special forces, established in 1968 and disbanded 1995
