= Joint Task Force Empire Shield =

New York state military unit

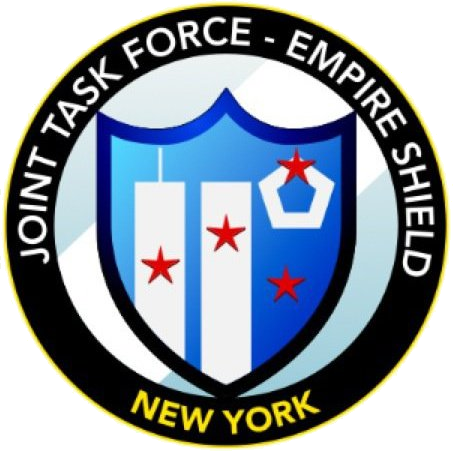
- Active: 2001-Present
- Country: United States
- Allegiance: State of New York
- Branch: New York Army National Guard, New York Air National Guard, New York Naval Militia, New York Guard
- Role: New York Military Defense, Civil Support Operations
- Size: 809(2024)
- Part of: New York State Division of Military and Naval Affairs
- Garrison/HQ: Fort Hamilton
- Decorations: State of New York Executive Chamber Citation by Governor Kathy Hochul, September 12, 2024

Commanders
- Task Force Commander: Col. Jeffrey D. Roth

Joint Task Force Empire Shield is an element of the New York State Division of Military and Naval Affairs partly responsible for the military defense of New York City, primarily the deterrence and prevention of internal security threats. It is composed of personnel from the New York Army National Guard, the New York Air National Guard, the New York Guard, and the New York Naval Militia.

== History ==
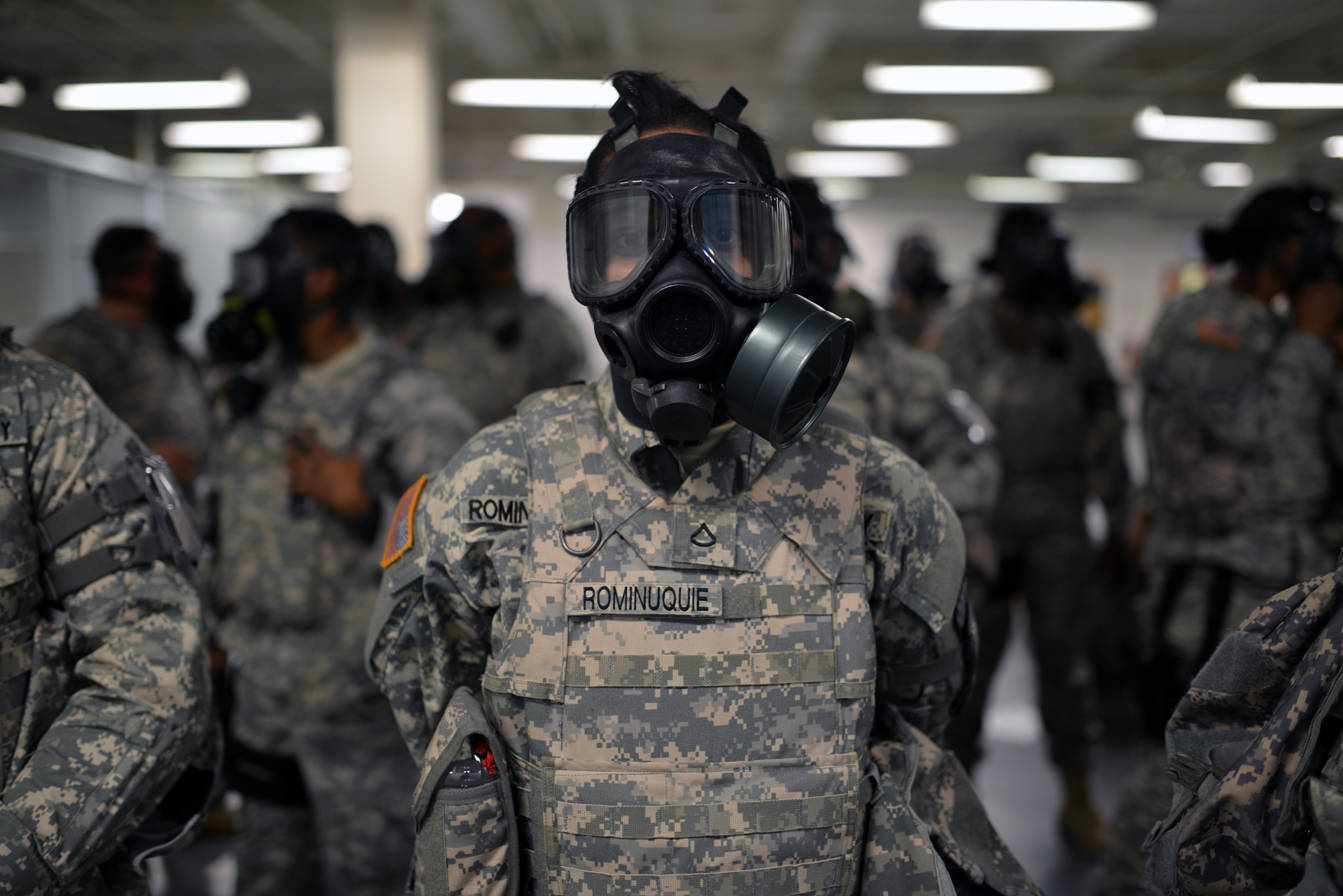
Empire Shield soldiers pictured in chemical protective masks in 2014

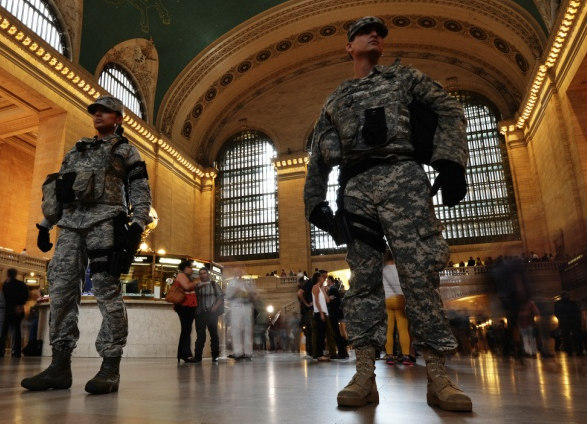
Empire Shield soldiers pictured at Grand Central Terminal in 2016

Joint Task Force Empire Shield was activated in response to the September 11 attacks.

As of 2009, New York was spending $16 million per biennium to maintain Joint Task Force Empire Shield. By 2011 this had grown to $19.5 million. For 2018 the proposed budget for Empire Shield was $33 million.

== Organization ==
Empire Shield is composed of three ad hoc companies: Alpha, Bravo, and Charlie. Personnel are drawn from the New York Army National Guard, the New York Air National Guard, the New York Guard, and the New York Naval Militia who are placed on state active duty status. In 2017, the force had an authorized, but not actual, strength of 500 personnel. (Note: In 2009, actual strength was 280 personnel.) The three companies rotate between three mission assignments: quick reaction force (QRF), pop-up mission, and training cycle.

The quick reaction force fulfills the National Guard reaction forces mission in New York City, which provides combat units "designed to respond to an incident ahead of federal assets with the capability to be logistically self-sustaining for up to 72 hours". Pop-up mission elements, meanwhile, conduct preventative patrols of New York transportation hubs including Penn Station, Grand Central Terminal, John F. Kennedy International Airport, and LaGuardia Airport. Joint Task Force Empire Shield also conducts random patrols at the Indian Point Energy Center, a nuclear power plant in Buchanan, New York. In March 2024 the field of operation was extended to the subway to assist the MTA Police and the NYPD to check bags of commuters, due to increasing crime in the subway system.

Joint Task Force Empire Shield is headquartered at Fort Hamilton.

== See also ==
- Military aid to the civil power
