= Soto Cano Air Base =

Honduran military base

Soto Cano Air Base Base aérea José Enrique Soto Cano
- IATA: XPL; ICAO: MHPR

Summary
- Airport type: Public / Military
- Serves: Comayagua / Tegucigalpa
- Location: Comayagua, Honduras
- Elevation AMSL: 628 m (2,060 ft)
- Coordinates: 14°22′57″N 087°37′16″W

Map
- Location in Honduras

Runways
Direction	Length		Surface
Direction	m	ft	Surface
17/35	2,441	8,009	Asphalt
- Source: DAFIF

Soto Cano Air Base (IATA: XPL, ICAO: MHPR) is a Honduran military base 5 mi (8.0 km) to the south of Comayagua in Honduras. It houses 1,200–1,500 U.S. troops and is also used by the Honduran Air Force academy. The airbase became operational in 1940, changing the old location of the Honduras Air Force Academy in Toncontin, Tegucigalpa to Palmerola. It serves as one of the important bases to the US Military's presence in Central America.

The U.S. government once used Palmerola (as previously known) as a base of operations to support its foreign policy objectives in the 1980s. Now the U.S. military uses Soto Cano as a launching point for humanitarian aid missions throughout Honduras and Central America.

In addition to the Honduran Air Force Academy, the U.S. military's Joint Task Force Bravo (JTF-B) is headquartered at Soto Cano.

== About Soto Cano and JTF-Bravo command and structure ==
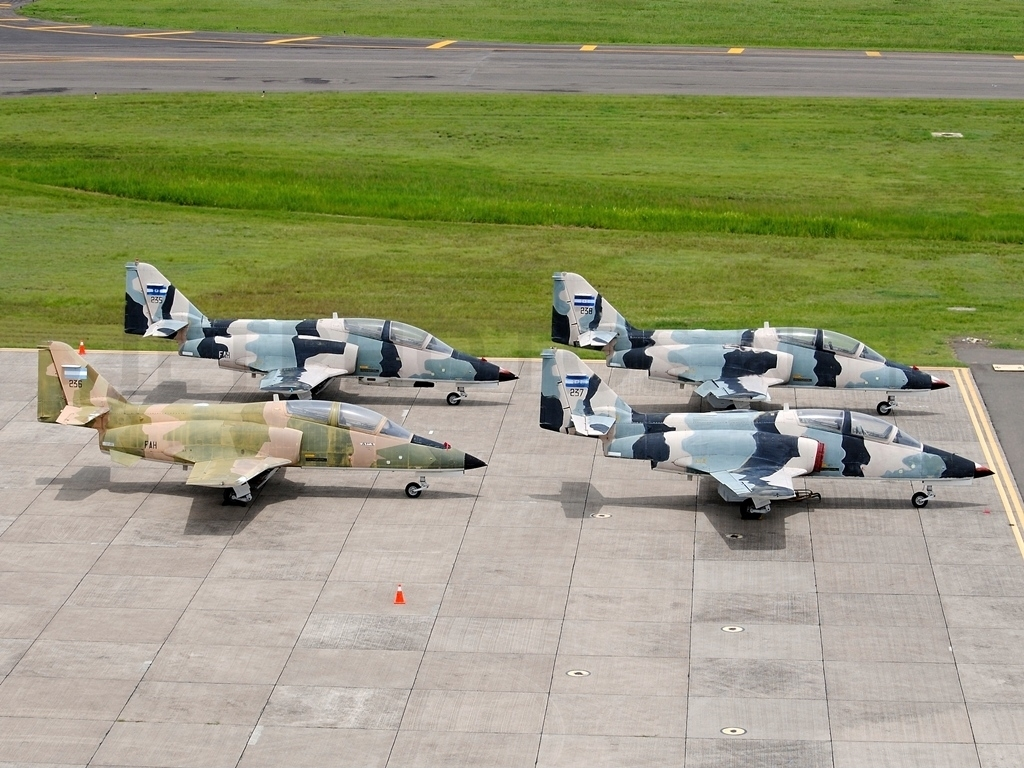
CASA C-101 Aviojets of the Honduran Air Force at Soto Cano

José Enrique Soto Cano Air Base is a Honduras military installation and home of the Honduras Air Force and Honduras Air Force Academy. It is located less than 10 mi (16 km) from Comayagua (population: 33,000), and 60 mi (97 km) from the Honduras capital, Tegucigalpa. The base is about 2 mi × 6 mi (3.2 km × 9.7 km); lies in the Comayagua Valley and is ringed by 8,000 ft (2,438 m) mountain peaks to the east and west. Soto Cano sits at an elevation of 2,062 ft (628 m) above sea level.

The American contingent at Soto Cano Air Base is designated Joint Task Force-Bravo and consists of U.S. military personnel, U.S. civilians and Honduran civilians. They work in five different major support commands (MSCs) including the 612th Air Base Squadron (ABS), Army Forces Battalion, Joint Security Forces, Medical Element, and the 1st Battalion, 228th Aviation Regiment. The 1-228th Aviation provides aviation support for the JTF-Bravo humanitarian and disaster recovery missions. The Joint-Staff provides command and control for JTF-B and falls directly under the JTF-B Commander. The requirement is for a U.S. Army Colonel to be the Commander of JTF-B and a U.S. Air Force Lieutenant Colonel to be the Deputy Commander. In addition, MEDEL, 1-228th AV, and ARFOR are commanded by U.S. Army officers, while, the 612th ABS and JSF are commanded by U.S. Air Force officers. Within the Joint Staff, Air Force personnel remain under the administrative control (ADCON) of AFSOUTH while Army personnel are ADCON under ARSOUTH. The J-1 Staff Directorate retains the responsibility for any local administrative requirements for all Joint-Staff service members.

The 612 ABS has among its functions; weather forecasting, fire protection, and maintaining a 24-hour C-5 Galaxy-capable runway. The Army Forces operate finance, personnel and airborne operations. Joint Security Forces consists of Air Force and Army force protection personnel who patrol the base and provide gate guard duty alongside their Honduran counterparts.

Health care services are performed by the Medical Element. The 1-228th Aviation performs a variety of airlift support missions throughout Central and South America with UH-60 Black Hawk and CH-47 Chinook helicopters. U.S. forces are guests on the base which is the home of the Honduran Air Force Academy. Soto Cano is not a U.S. installation as some media report. The United States Department of Defense pays approximately 96% of all annual costs associated with operation and maintenance of the base, thereby in practice, controlling most operational decisions associated with the base.

== Infrastructure ==
The Constitution of Honduras does not permit a permanent foreign presence in Honduras. A handshake agreement between the United States and Honduras allows JTF-Bravo to remain in Honduras on a semi-permanent basis. This agreement, an annex to the 1954 military assistance agreement between the United States and Honduras, can be abrogated with little notice. Soto Cano lodging for U.S. personnel there consists of "hooches" with a tin roof, with air conditioners and fans for cooling. Metal dormitories are more permanent structures and have air conditioning. Both contain beds and other furniture, televisions, refrigerators and microwaves. The hooches and metal barracks had no running water. However, latrines, shower facilities and laundry rooms were centrally located within the living areas. In February 2015, three brand new barracks were opened on the installation, allowing the "hooches" to be torn down and personnel reassigned to better housing. Volleyball courts, barbecues and bohios (covered picnic areas) are also located throughout the base. All the domestic facilities, like the post office, library, dining facility, fitness center, pool and base exchange, are clustered together within a five-minute walking distance.

Apartments and dormitories are replacing some of the 270 wooden hooches used for decades by permanent party personnel that are now used by permanent party and temporary duty personnel. Most permanent party personnel are stationed at JTF-Bravo for several months and the assignment is treated as a remote assignment, much like assignments to Republic of Korea.

All military and U.S. civilian personnel live on the installation; contractors live off base on the local economy. Contractors and foreign national employees are the only personnel allowed to drive personal vehicles on base and the majority of people walk or ride bicycles. Because the base is so compact, this poses no problem getting around.

Personnel assigned to Soto Cano can ride a bus that will transport them to Soto Cano from Tegucigalpa. The bus runs in conjunction with aircraft arrival and departure times.

== Civil aviation ==
In 1990 Honduran President Rafael Leonardo Callejas decreed that commercial cargo flights were authorized to operate from Soto Cano. In 2008 President Manuel Zelaya announced that commercial flights would begin at Palmerola within a period of 60 days, after the crash of TACA Flight 390 at Toncontín International Airport which resulted in 5 deaths was blamed on the runway being too short at Toncontín. Following an investigation into the incident, Pilot error was found to be the main cause. The military was placed in charge of building a civilian air terminal with funding from the Bolivarian Alternative for the Americas (enabled by emergency decrees). This however was cancelled after Zelaya was removed from office on June 28, 2009, in the 2009 Honduran coup d'état. The airport authority and the government of Honduras resumed airport relocation talks in April 2011 and announced that work on the new Palmerola airport would start by the fall of 2011 after years of efforts to replace Toncontín International with an airport at Palmerola in Comayagua where the Soto Cano Air Base is located. However, in a September 25, 2011 update, President Lobo stated officials were still "evaluating the pros and cons" of constructing the new airport. This comes three years after former President Manuel Zelaya had announced that all commercial flights would be transferred to Soto Cano Air Base; however, work on the new terminal at Soto Cano was then cancelled after Zelaya was removed from office on 28 June 2009 in the 2009 Honduran coup d'état. Upon realization of the Palmerola airport, commercial flights to and from Toncontín would continue to operate but would be limited to small aircraft and domestic flights.
