= Joint Task Force-Homeland Defense =

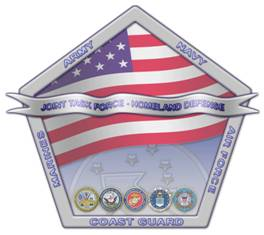
- Emblem of the Joint Task Force-Homeland Defense.
- Active: 2006–2013
- Country: United States
- Type: Standing Task Force
- Headquarters: Fort Shafter, in Hawaii
- Nickname: JTF-HD

Commanders
- Commander: LTG Francis J. Wiercinski, United States Army

Source: JTF-HD PAO

Commander of U.S. Pacific Command established a Joint Task Force for Homeland Defense (JTF-HD) with Commander of U.S. Army, Pacific - Headquartered at Fort Shafter, Hawaii as the designated Commander.

Joint Task Force Homeland Defense's mission is to execute operations to provide Civil Support (CS) or Foreign Humanitarian Assistance (FHA) for all hazards including responding to and recovering from natural or man-made disasters and defeats threats in the land domain in order to retain key/critical infrastructure and protect the force within the Joint Operations Area (JOA). - Approved 13 April 2010 CDR JTF-HD

The JTF-HD Joint Operations Area (JOA) is the land domain areas of the state of Hawaii, the U.S. Territories of Guam, American Samoa, and Jarvis Island. The Commonwealth of the Northern Mariana Islands (CNMI); the Compact States, which include the Federated States of Micronesia (FSM), the Republic of the Marshall Islands (RMI), and the Republic of Palau (ROP); and the U.S. possessions of Wake Island, Midway Island, Johnston Island, Baker Island, Howland Island, Palmyra Atoll, and Kingman Reef. (JTF-HD CONPLAN 5002-07)

Operational Overview

• Maintains level 1 staff of more than 50 personnel
• Validates disaster preparedness
• Integrates with joint-interagency partners
• Collaborates through several interoperable systems

Interoperability Campaign

Starting in 2006, JTF-HD in coordination with DOS and the JOA partners conducted site surveys, assessed infrastructure, IT-systems capabilities, communications, intelligence fusion, medical response capabilities, and emergency operations, in order to develop planning strategies designed to enhance the capacity of the joint-interagency stakeholders ability to prepare for, respond to, and recover from all-hazards.
• Supports USPACOM’s Theater Security Cooperation Program (TSCP) across the JTF-HD JOA
• All Hazards Decision Support System: Comprehensive tool to integrate data collection, analysis, and operational support.

Points of Contact
Joint Operations Center (JOC) Watch Officer (Ft. Shafter T-101: (808) 438-4899, (808) 438-4904
Public Affairs Office: Darrell Ames, darrell.ames@us.army.mil, (808) 438-5853
