= Operation Kiribati Assist =

Operation Kiribati Assist is the Australian Defence Force's (ADF) contribution to a request from the Government of Kiribati to assist in the disposal of World War II unexploded ordnance (UXO) from locations throughout Kiribati.

The Kiribati islands were occupied by the Japanese during World War II. Most of the UXO encountered in Kiribati are remnants from this conflict. They include military ordnance such as artillery projectiles, aerial bombs, rockets, mortars and mines.

An ADF Joint Task Force (JTF) was raised known as JTF 637, and was deployed to Kiribati over the period 7–26 August 2008. JTF 637 comprises approximately 22 personnel, including a Command Group, a Royal Australian Navy Clearance Diving Team to handle underwater UXO, Army and RAAF Explosive Ordnance Disposal (EOD) teams who will handle land-based UXO, including air-delivered items and a Medical Team.

== Role ==
JTF 637 disposed of UXO identified during a 2007 reconnaissance of the islands and scope any future UXO disposal requirements and (EOD) training opportunities for the Kiribati Police Service during their deployment.
