= Joint Task Force for Elimination =

A Joint Task Force for Elimination (JTF-E) headquarters was a concept for a military task force headquarters staffed by joint personnel for the purpose of conducting WMD Elimination operations through command and control of joint elimination enablers such as nuclear disablement teams, CBRN Response Teams, radiation assessment teams, and medical laboratories. A JTF-E headquarters may be formed per Joint Publication 3-40 (JP 3-40) one of two ways: 1) An existing headquarters designated by a Combatant Commander with Joint Elimination Coordination Element (JECE) augmentation and 2) Joint Forces Command (JFCOM) establishing a JTF-E by utilizing the JECE and another existing headquarters.

WMD elimination operations are actions to systematically locate, characterize, secure, disable, or destroy WMD programs and related capabilities. The objective of WMD elimination operations is to prevent the looting or capture of WMD and related materials; render harmless or destroy weapons, materials, agents, and delivery systems that pose an immediate or direct threat to the Armed Forces of the United States and civilian population; and exploit, for intelligence purposes, program experts, documents, and other media, as well as previously secured weapons and material to combat further WMD proliferation and prevent regeneration of a WMD capacity.

A JTF-E should possess the following capabilities:

- (1) Coordinate, through the supported Combatant Commander (CCDR), to ensure an interagency approach to isolate the adversary's WMD program. This includes capabilities used to isolate personnel, equipment, material, agents, weapons, and delivery systems that may not be controlled at the tactical level. These include capabilities to monitor and coordinate denial measures to close down cross border proliferation and ex-filtration of WMD, related material, means of delivery, and program personnel.
- (2) In coordination with, and with assistance from, maneuver forces, locate, seize and secure WMD, WMD sites, means of delivery, related-material, and expertise

across a broad scope of programs.

- (3) Coordinate exploitation of WMD sites and individuals associated with WMD programs.
- (4) Conduct rapid destruction/render harmless nonnuclear WMD or WMD agents (e.g., mixed chemical and biological agents) in various dispositions (bulk, rounds, submunitions) for force protection purposes.
- (5) Integrate the exploitation of WMD infrastructure (e.g., plutonium reprocessing and high-enrichment uranium facilities); WMD R&D (e.g., nuclear research reactors); and WMD weapons, components, and materials.
- (6) Redirect expertise. When directed, transfer former adversary's personnel with WMD-related expertise or their personnel files to the lead USG agency for threat

reduction cooperation.

- (7) When directed, initiate redirection of WMD programs and catalogue dual-use facilities in preparation for transfer to the lead OGA for threat reduction cooperation

or similar mission.

- (8) Locate, seize, and control illicit or excess radiological materials.
- (9) Exploit and, if necessary, destroy WMD-capable missile systems and other delivery systems.
- (10) Report potential imminent threats discovered in accordance with JOPES and supported CCDR procedures.
- (11) Recommend reprioritization of WMD program components based on exploited sites.
- (12) Remain in compliance with related treaties; and establish and maintain chain of custody of seized materials, records, and personnel for further exploitation or

transfer to legal authorities.

- (13) Coordinate and deconflict existing nuclear render safe capabilities with JTF-E operations.

This construct evolved from the 2006 and 2010 Quadrennial Defense Reviews to become the Standing Joint Force Headquarters for Elimination (SJFQ-E) and was assigned to Defense Threat Reduction Agency in 2012. That role was eliminated in 2018 when USSTRATCOM gave up its lead DoD responsibility to plan for and advocate counter-WMD issues to USSOCOM.

== See also ==
- Elimination doctrine
