= Task Force ALBA =

1999 humanitarian operation of the Swiss Air Force in Albania

Task Force ALBA was the name of a humanitarian operation of the Swiss Air Force in Albania under a UNHCR-mission during 1999. The goals of the operation were to restore living conditions, provide humanitarian aid, and prevent the outbreak of civil war. It was the first longterm humanitarian mission for the Air Force abroad and the first use of Swiss Air Force helicopters in the edge region of a war zone.

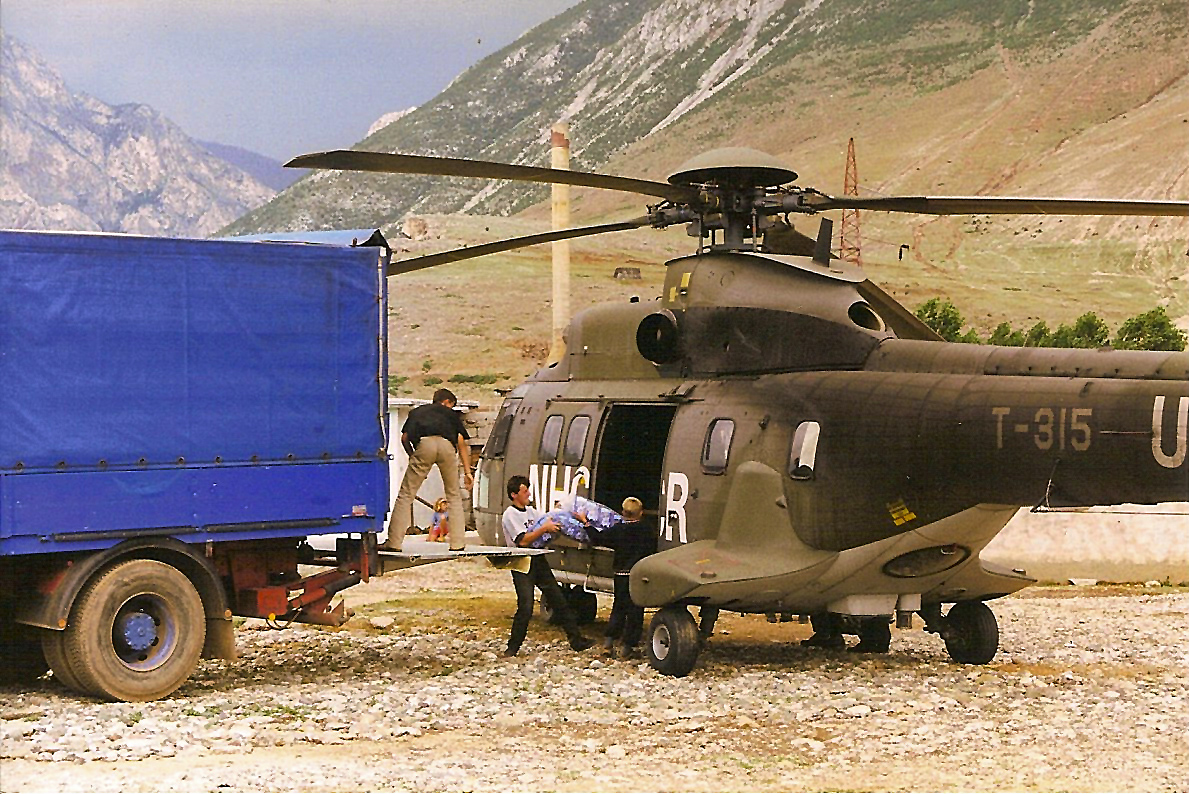
Super Puma T-315 at Kukës

Task Force ALBA – main locations of operation in Albania

== Context ==
Already in 1998 the number of refugees requesting asylum in Switzerland from the area increased due to the simmering conflict in Kosovo to such an extent that the civilian response capacity in Switzerland beat against their limits. The Federal Council decided that at the end of 1998 to use the army to care for and to engage directly in the crisis area to prevent further swelling.

After the outbreak of war in Kosovo in 1999, the Governments of Albania and Macedonia asked for an international humanitarian intervention after major refugee flows Kosovo Albanian civilians came to this country. The Federal Council decided on 1 April 1999, just before Easter, military assistance to support the primary helping Swiss Humanitarian Aid Unit (SHA) and the UNHCR.

== Implementation of the operation ==
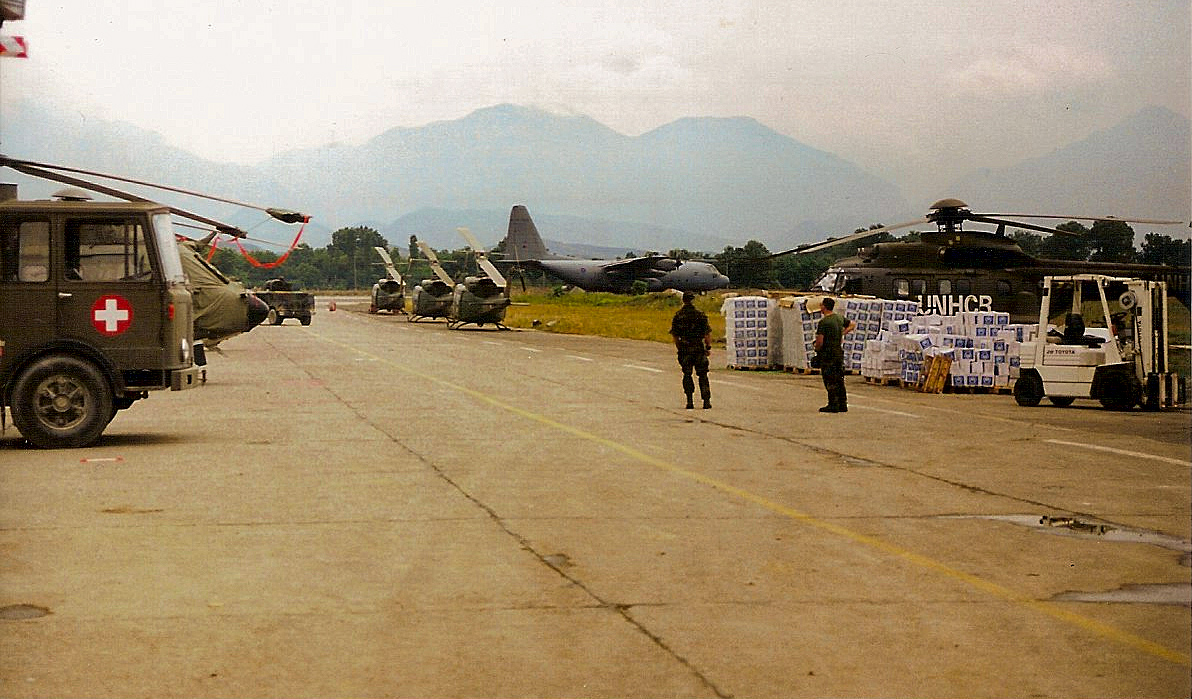
«Swiss Camp» Super Puma and Franz Brozincevic Wetzikon Aircraft refulling Truck on Tirana Airport

The operations were carried out in the framework of the Task Force of the surveillance squadron pilots (UeG) of the Air Force with three transport helicopters of the type Eurocopter AS332 Super Puma ("Super Puma", serial number T-315, T-322 and T-312). The Chief in Command was the later Swiss Air Force General Walter Knutti.

First, several operational plans were drawn up on Good Friday in the helicopter base of the Swiss Air Force at the military airfield Alpnach. On Easter Sunday a recconteam first flew to Albania. On Easter Monday, the helicopters were readied and loaded with the necessary equipment. On Tuesday after Easter (April 6), the first helicopter with the routing Florence and Brindisi flew to Tirana. The next two Super Puma had to fly over southern Italy and Greece, as NATO had in the meantime established over the Adriatic a no-fly zone. The camp was built on the Rinas (Tirana) Airport, which had then taken the US Army.

Additional staff of the Federal Office for the Air Force operations (BABLW) and the Fortress Guard (FWK) was flown down with the Dassault Falcon 50 and Learjet. The material arrived by truck on Friday evening in Albania. From the next day, the daily replenishment and personnel exchange of a hired transport aircraft of the Spanish Air Force was acquired (CASA/IPTN CN-235). The construction of the infrastructure of the camp met at the airport at the beginning to several problems such as swampy areas and non-existent sanitation facilities. The camp was fully operational on 9 April.

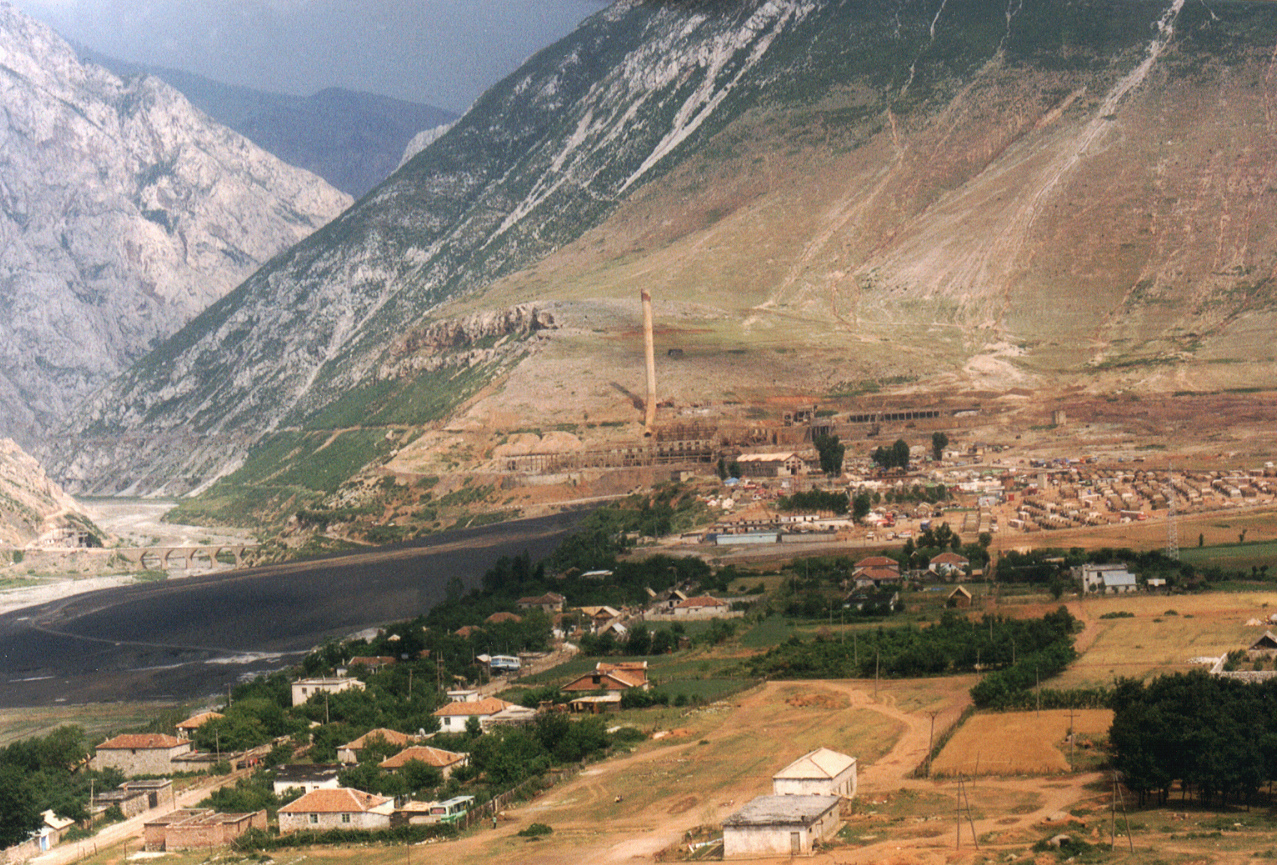
Refugee Camp Kukës photographed out of a Super Puma

The primary purpose of the operation was to supply the Refugee camp around the northern Albanian town of Kukës, near the border with Kosovo. The mountainous region in the northeast and Albania was deposited on the road is very difficult to achieve. About 50 volunteer army personnel were involved on site, a total of nearly 150 people. In 725 missions and nearly 800 flight hours (around 25% of the normal annual budget) were 878 tons of material (especially food) and 5,200 passengers transported and carried out 350 medical evacuations with serious injuries.

At the request of the Euro-Atlantic Disaster Response Coordination Centre the Swiss government launched the mission on April 6, 1999 and it was complete on July 24, 1999.

== Conclusion ==
The Swiss Air Force had to deal with new problems during Task Force ALBA that brought new experience to the organization. The main problem arose from the use of a neutral country in the context of NATO operations as well the one-sided position of the company, risking the possibility of it being dragged-in to the conflict, as well as issues regarding interoperability. Other problem areas were legal issues (legal status, carrying of weapons), the lack of doctrine (e.g. for application, logistics, and support), insufficient transportation capacity over long distances, insufficient human resources on the part of the Air Force, domestic political resistance against the possible use by Militia personnel, and crisis management in rapidly changing conditions.

The experience of the Task Force ALBA were evaluated for the following Swisscoy use within the multinational KFOR operation in Kosovo.
