= Task Force Bayonet =

Task Force Bayonet serves as a name for several military task forces throughout history:

United States

- The deactivated 193rd Infantry Brigade, last stationed in the Panama Canal Zone.
- The 173rd Airborne Brigade Combat Team, currently located in Caserma Ederle, Vicenza, Italy.
