= Combined Joint Task Force 82 =

US-led force in Afghanistan (2003, 2007–09)

Combined Task Force 82 (CJTF-82) was a US led subordinate formation of the International Security Assistance Force (ISAF) in 2003 and 2007–09. It originally served as both the National Command Element for U.S. forces in Afghanistan, reporting directly to the Commander, United States Central Command, and as ISAF's Regional Command East. It was replaced by Combined Joint Task Force 101 (CJTF-101) in early April 2008. In May 2009, CJTF-82 returned to Bagram Air Field and assumed control of the east. Shortly thereafter United States Forces Afghanistan (USFOR-A) officially took over responsibility as the National Command Element for the theater.

CJTF-82 was headquartered at Bagram Air Base.

== Subordinate fighting formations ==
Under Combined Joint Task Force 180 and later Combined Forces Command - Afghanistan (CFC-A), the corps-level overall headquarters, a division level headquarters supervising fighting brigades was maintained in Afghanistan in 2002–2004. The HQ was provided in succession by different US Army light divisional headquarters. Combined Joint Task Force Mountain, drawn from 10th Mountain Division, the headquarters that oversaw Operation Anaconda, was the first of these HQs. Later changes in the Divisional HQ providing the task force HQ saw changes to the name, first to Combined Joint Task Force 76 and then to CJTF 82.

The mission of CJTF-76 was to conduct a 'full spectrum of operations throughout its operations area to defeat [the] enemy extremist movement, establish an enduring security and reshape its posture for the Long War in order to set conditions for long-term stability in Afghanistan.'

CJTF 76 had a one-point two combat brigades under its control, which conducted counter-insurgency operations against Taliban and Al-Qaeda in the east and south of the country. The Task Force and its subordinate formations comprised a shifting group of units and formations. There were also engineer and special operations Task Forces, plus the Provincial Reconstruction Teams.

The lead fighting formation of CJTF-180 changed in mid-April 2004 to the 25th Infantry Division (Light), resulting in a designator change to CJTF-76. CJTF 76 was in place until March 2007.

In March 2005, the U.S. Army's Southern European Task Force (SETAF) took the leadership role in CJTF-76. In February 2006, the 10th Mountain Division (Light Infantry) took over CJTF-76 leadership.

At the time of the transfer of authority of the RC East area from U.S. Central Command to the NATO-led ISAF, CJTF-76 was commanded by Maj. Gen. Benjamin Freakley of the U.S. 10th Mountain Division (Light Infantry).

With the inactivation of CFC-A in late 2006, CJTF-76 transitioned to ISAF command as headquarters for ISAF's Regional Command East. The elimination of the intermediate U.S. CFC-A meant the commander CJTF-76 simultaneously reported to the Commander, U.S. Central Command as the National Command Element for U.S. forces in Afghanistan.

CJTF-76 was replaced by CJTF-82, led by the 82nd Airborne Division, in March 2007.

== Post Handover to ISAF ==
With the concurrence of the Commander, U.S. Central Command, and upon the inactivation of HQ CFC-A, Headquarters CJTF-76 became the United States National Command Element for the Afghanistan Combined Joint Operations Area (CJOA).

The Commander of CJTF-76 was also the regional commander of Regional Command East.

The Commander, Joint Task Force-76, Maj. Gen. Benjamin Freakley was given two positions, as the US operational commander and the NATO/ISAF deputy commander for security. The goal was to maintain proper coordination between the two organizations.

== Notes ==
- United States Army, 'A Different Kind of War'
