= Siege of Musa Qala =

2006 siege of Afghan town

- Part of the War in Afghanistan (2001–2021) and the Helmand province campaign
Date	July 17 – September 12, 2006 (1 month, 3 weeks and 5 days)
Location	Helmand Province, Afghanistan 32°20′57.2″N 64°46′21.0″E
Result	Inconclusive, both forces withdraw

Belligerents
United Kingdom; Denmark; Islamic Republic of Afghanistan; Canada; United States	Taliban

Commanders and leaders
Battle group: (United Kingdom) Brig. Ed Butler; Garrison: (United Kingdom) Maj. Nick Wight-Boycott (Denmark) Maj. Lars Ulslev Johannesen (United Kingdom) Maj. Adam Jowett	Mullah Abdul Manan; Mullah Abdul Ghafour

Strength
Garrison: 25–170 (ISAF); 70-80 (ANP); Relief forces: Up to 500	N/A

Casualties and losses
(United Kingdom) 7 killed (Denmark) 7 wounded	Roughly 200 confirmed killed

The siege of Musa Qala took place between July 17 and September 12, 2006 in Afghanistan's Helmand province. A small force of International Security Assistance Force (ISAF) troops and Afghan security forces were besieged by Taliban insurgents inside the district centre of Musa Qala.

== Situation in Musa Qala ==
Musa Qala ("the fortress of Moses") is the capital of Musa Qala District, lying on the banks of the Musa Qala River, a tributary of the Helmand River. Its population was variously estimated at 15,000 or 20,000, who for the most part belong to the Alizai Pashtun tribe, which is itself divided into six principal clans. Infighting between clans is a common occurrence, as they compete for power and resources.

In 2001, when the US-led intervention drove the Taliban from power, the local tribesmen accepted the advent of the Karzai administration, and they convinced the Taliban not to conduct guerrilla warfare in their area. Without popular support, the Taliban were forced to abandon Musa Qala and take refuge in nearby villages. However, the local people gradually became disillusioned with the central government. In 2003, the governor of Helmand province, Sher Mohammed Akhundzada, conducted a raid into the village of Akhtak, in Baghran District, where insurgents were sheltering, killing 80 people, most of which were civilians. The governor pledged to pay compensation to the relatives of the deceased, but never kept his promise. Promises of reconstruction were not kept either, and the tribesmen were angered by the corruption and thievery of local officials. By 2006, the Taliban had regained much of their influence in Musa Qala, a development which they attributed to the depredations of governor Akhundzada and his militias.

== Deployment of ISAF troops ==
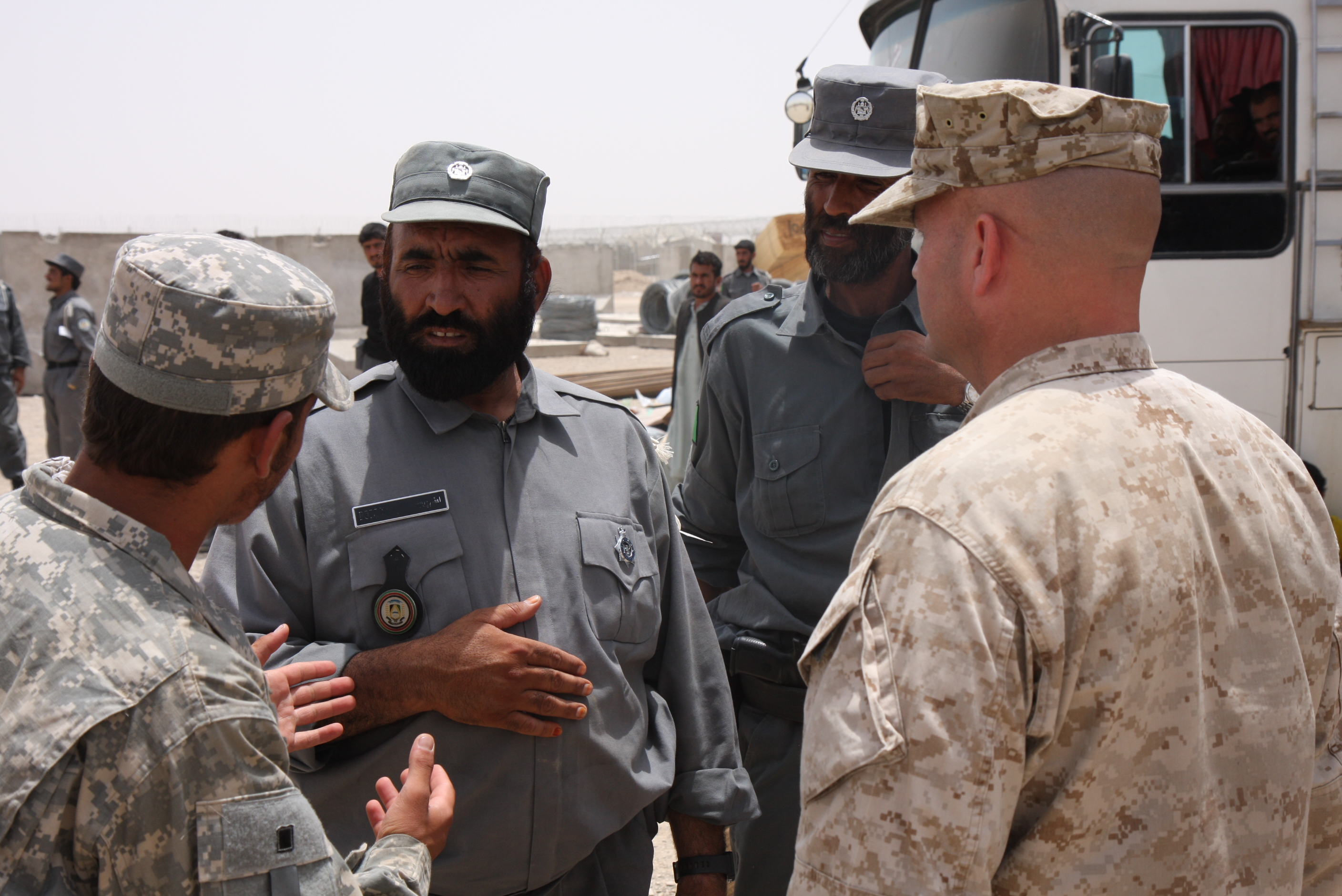
"Coco" the Musa Qala police chief in 2008. "He was a menace and he was a great guy" according to one British officer.

In 2006, the ISAF mandate was expanded to include the restive provinces of southern Afghanistan. Helmand became the responsibility of a primarily British unit, Task Force Helmand. Due to his involvement in the opium trade and links with the insurgency, the British insisted that Governor Akhundzada be removed from his post. His replacement, engineer Mohammad Daoud lacked local support, and as Akhundzada's militias had become inactive, the Taliban hastened to fill the power vacuum, and the situation rapidly deteriorated.

On May 18, 2006, insurgents attacked the Afghan National Police (ANP) force in Musa Qala, killing 20 policemen. The British Pathfinder Platoon was deployed to Musa Qala for five days to assist the police before being replaced by an American unit. On June 14, they were ordered to return to Musa Qala. The 25-man Pathfinder Platoon, commanded by Major Nick Wight-Boycott, was primarily a mobile reconnaissance unit, and thus were not best suited for garrison duties. However, the Battle Group's resources were already stretched and there were no other units available.

The Musa Qala district centre was a cluster of low cement and mud buildings surrounded by a 10-foot wall. Situated in the middle of the town, it housed the local police headquarters, a prison and a clinic built by the Americans. The Pathfinders took over a building in the center of the compound and emplaced three sangars (fortified posts), with one on the roof of their building, one facing east towards the market, and one on a building just outside the compound walls. The tallest building in the district centre was the prison, which was soon nicknamed "the Alamo" by the Pathfinders, who sited a .50 calibre machine gun on its roof. An 80-man Afghan National Police detachment also garrisoned the district centre. The ANP were hated by the local population, who accused them of thievery and pedophilia. The leader of the ANP contingent, whose name was Abdul Wulley, was known to the British and the Taliban alike as "Coco". A veteran of Afghanistan's 30 years of war, and himself a former Taliban member, Coco regularly communicated with the insurgents, and had extensive knowledge of their movements. The police in Musa Qala were, the British noted, undisciplined and slack about their duties, but they were also more than willing to fight the insurgents.

Two weeks after the arrival of the Pathfinders, an American convoy was ambushed in the nearby green zone, and several vehicles were lost. The Americans responded with massive firepower, including an airstrike from a B-1 bomber and attacks by AH-64 Apache helicopters. Following this incident, the population of Musa Qala began to flee and British intelligence suggested the Taliban had encircled the district centre. However, on the next day, coalition jets conducted low-level flyovers over the town, and no Taliban attack occurred, though some small arms fire struck the base. The Pathfinders were joined by 6 Platoon, B Company, 3 PARA (the Guards Parachute Platoon), freeing them to conduct patrols through the town, and by July 1, the population had gradually returned to their homes.

On July 6, the Pathfinders were scheduled to be replaced by G battery, 7 Para RHA, who were supposed to drive into Musa Qala through the green zone. The Pathfinders escorted the ANP contingent in their Land Rover WMIK in order to secure the route, but when they were fired upon by insurgents, the policemen broke formation to engage their enemies, and the operation broke down in confusion. After a similar attempt on the next day also failed, the Guards Parachute Platoon were flown out and a mixed force of 20 gunners from I Battery, 7 RHA, 15 engineers, five Danish and ten Afghan National Army (ANA) soldiers were flown in. The engineers were put to work consolidating the defenses of the base with locally-purchased materials.

== The siege ==
"Most of the fighters weren't real Taleban. There were some outsiders, but most were local men who were angry with the Government, its robbery and corruption, who were persuaded to fight against the foreign infidels by our preachers in the mosques."
Wakil Haji Mohammed Naim, Musa Qala elder

At one o'clock on July 17, 2006, the British garrison observed several figures approaching the district centre through their night vision devices. Shortly afterward, the Taliban opened fire with a volley of four or five RPGs followed by small-arms fire. The Pathfinders returned fire with their SA80 rifles, machine-guns and 51 mm mortars. Major Wight-Boycott ordered an artillery strike on a nearby building where a group of insurgents had taken refuge. The building, which happened to be a mosque, was heavily damaged by the strike, and a large number of Taliban were killed. When "Coco" the police chief reported that Taliban trucks were moving down a nearby wadi, the garrison called for an airstrike that destroyed one of the trucks. Two insurgents were subsequently killed by machine-gun fire as they were seen crawling towards the base. British intelligence suggested the Taliban had taken heavy losses, and in a report filed the next day, Wight-Boycott hoped he had given them a "bloody nose". This, however, did not prevent the Taliban from regrouping and again advancing towards the district centre on the night of July 19. The defenders called an artillery fire mission, and several aircraft flew overhead, deterring the insurgents from attacking. After this, the Taliban returned every evening to launch limited harassment attacks.

By this time, the Pathfinders had spent six weeks in the field, and they were beginning to show signs of exhaustion, while their equipment was becoming worn by constant use in difficult conditions. They were due to be relieved by the Danish light reconnaissance squadron, a 140-man force equipped with Mowag Eagle armoured vehicles. The Danish forces, accompanied by some British signals specialists, departed Camp Bastion on July 21. As the relief force approached Musa Qala from the west, the Pathfinders observed groups of Taliban regrouping to ambush them, and directed a Harrier GR7 strike against the insurgents, killing several. The Taliban had blocked the road with barrels, and attacked the Danish column from three sides with machine guns and RPGs. The column halted when one Eagle was destroyed by a mine and its three crewmen were wounded, and, after having directed an airstrike from a B-1 bomber against Taliban positions, it withdrew into the desert, much to the dismay of the Pathfinders. The garrison had now run out of food and water, and were reduced to drinking goat's milk, while their ammunition was also running low, and they had no more batteries for their night vision devices. The Taliban chose July 24 to launch their largest attack thus far against the district centre, in the form of a concerted assault by 300 militants against every side of the base. The attack opened with an RPG strike that destroyed one of the sangars, causing a Danish soldier to fall outside of the compound. Private Mark Wilson of the Pathfinders used an old bedstead to climb the compound wall and help the injured Dane to safety under enemy fire, for which he was later awarded the Military Cross. Air support took 90 minutes to arrive, during which the base was subjected to continuous fire, which would have been even heavier if the Danish column had not intercepted Taliban reinforcements approaching from Now Zad.

On July 26, after coalition aircraft dropped six 1,000-pound bombs on known Taliban positions, the relief force finally broke into Musa Qala. There were no casualties, except for a Pathfinder sergeant who was accidentally shot by an ANP guard. A Danish officer, Major Lars Ulslev Johannesen, took over command of the district centre. On July 27, an airstrike mistakenly destroyed the mosque adjoining the base, infuriating the police chief and the town elders. Major Johannesen had to convene a shura and promise that the mosque would be rebuilt at the coalition's expense. When asked whether the inhabitants should evacuate the town, Johannesen answered that they should stay, but over the following days, the population gradually abandoned their homes, leaving the area as a battleground between the Taliban and the ISAF coalition.

== Relief of the Pathfinders ==
=== Operation Nakhod ===
The long-overdue evacuation of the Pathfinders remained a priority for the British. The first attempt, code-named Operation Nakhod, was made on August 1, but ended in failure. The relief force, consisting of a patrol of D Squadron, Household Cavalry Regiment, was ambushed on the outskirts of the town. A Spartan APC was destroyed by a roadside bomb, killing the patrol commander, Captain Alex Eida, and two soldiers, Second Lieutenant Ralph Johnson and Lance-Corporal Ross Nicholls. A Scimitar scout vehicle that came to their rescue was destroyed by multiple RPG hits, forcing its crew to bail out. The crew's commander, Corporal Mick Flynn, took charge of the survivors, and gave covering fire to Lance-Corporal Andrew Radford as he rescued an injured colleague. For their actions, they were later respectively awarded the Military Cross and the Conspicuous Gallantry Cross. A company of British paratroops was later airlifted to the area to recover the bodies and destroy any sensitive equipment. The British drew several lessons from the failure of Operation Nakhod. The Household Cavalry, operating in their traditional role of long-distance armoured reconnaissance units, were commanded by the brigade headquarters in Kandahar, whose lack of situational awareness and vague orders had contributed to the setback. As a result, they were transferred to the battle group, and the idea of employing armoured units without infantry support in built-up areas was abandoned. The failed operation also demonstrated that the Taliban firmly controlled the area surrounding Musa Qala, and that nothing short of a full battle group operation could relieve the garrison.

=== Operation Snakebite ===
In response to an obvious shortage of manpower, two platoons and a mortar section from the Royal Irish Regiment were deployed to Afghanistan, almost all volunteers. The Somme Platoon and the mortar troop were due to replace the Pathfinders.

The operation, codenamed Mar Chichel ("Snakebite" in Pashto), was the largest to date carried out by the coalition in Helmand, involving 500 troops. It began on August 6, and, in the first move, the Royal Irish units and a paratroop platoon secured a landing zone to the west of Musa Qala for 3 PARA's B and C companies. The 300 men then conducted an advance with fixed bayonets. Meanwhile, a Canadian unit in LAV III armoured vehicles broke through the green zone and assisted in linking up with the Danish troops. The Pathfinders were then able to drive away from Musa Qala where they had stayed for eight weeks, of which three were spent under constant attack. The Taliban compounds had been abandoned after heavy bombardment by B-1s, and the operation met only sporadic resistance, though one British supply convoy was fired upon as it departed, and Private Andrew Cutts of the Royal Logistic Corps was killed. An inquest held by an Oxfordshire coroner concluded that Private Cutts had probably fallen victim to "friendly fire" from British positions.

== Siege renewed ==
After Mar Chichel, Taliban attacks resumed, using every weapon in their arsenal, including machine guns, RPGs, mortars and Chinese-made 107 mm rockets. The ISAF coalition forces, now consisting of 140 Danish troopers and 38 Royal Irish Rangers, were corralled into the district centre. The Danish squadron, known as the Griffins, had eight .50 calibre heavy machine guns mounted on the base's sangars, giving them an all-round field of fire, and built ramps for their armoured vehicles so that they could shoot over the compound walls. Added to the Royal Irish's two 81 mm mortars, and coalition air support, they were sufficient to keep the Taliban at bay. The mortars proved particularly effective in dislodging the insurgents who sheltered in nearby buildings.

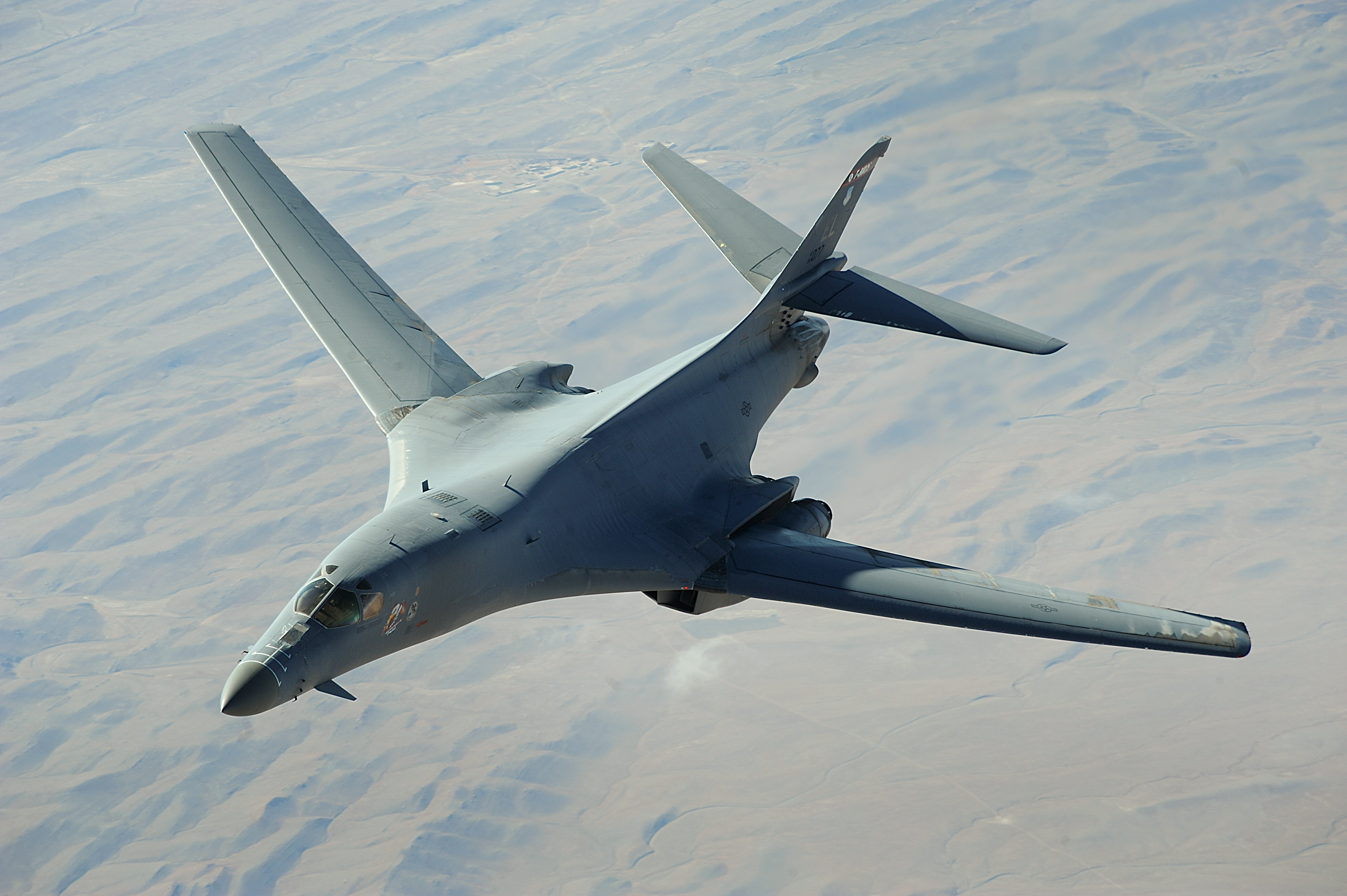
B-1 over Afghanistan

On August 12, Major Johannesen announced to the garrison that they would be evacuating their exposed position, much to the soldiers' relief. British General David Richards, who had taken command of the ISAF on August 1, had expressed his dissatisfaction with the "platoon house" strategy. However, the local authorities feared that Musa Qala would fall to the Taliban, and the Helmand governor appealed to the prime minister of Afghanistan. Under political pressure, the ISAF presence was prolonged, much to the puzzlement of the ISAF garrison, who observed that the danger posed to casualty evacuation helicopters meant that coalition patrols in the town had been curtailed, leaving it completely under Taliban control, except for the district centre.

After four weeks presence, the Griffins were withdrawn from Musa Qala. They were replaced by the Barossa Platoon of the Royal Irish Regiment, and an ad hoc company headquarters formed from 3 PARA personnel, led by Major Adam Jowett. Within the task force's order of battle, the new unit took the letter E, and thus became known as "Easy Company". The Danes had become suspicious of police chief "Coco" and his relations with the insurgents, so the resident police force were replaced by 70 non-Pashtun officers from northern Afghanistan, who were free of tribal links with the local population, which had cast a doubt on the loyalty of their predecessors. "Operation Atomi", involving more than 500 troops, was conducted on August 25, in order to reinforce the Musa Qala police force.

The departure of the Griffins led to a weakening of the base's defenses, as Easy Company now had only two .50 cal machine guns and nine 7.62×51mm NATO GPMGs. The Taliban became aware of the decrease in coalition combat power and began launching probing attacks against the district centre. On several occasions, insurgents crawled up to the compound walls and had to be driven back with hand grenades. On August 26, an insurgent group, that reports later estimated at 150 fighters, launched a massed attack on the district centre. The attack dissipated after an airstrike by an A-10, but began again at 4:55 the next day, and lasted until 7:00 am. During the firefight, Lance-Corporal John Hetherington was killed, as well as several Taliban, whose bodies were left lying across the street until, by tacit agreement, the insurgents were allowed to retrieve them.

By that time, the Taliban frontal attacks had failed with heavy loss, and their supply lines were being interdicted by D squadron, Household Cavalry Regiment, who operated in mobile operations groups in the desert. For a time, the insurgents were forced to resort to long-distance strikes with mortars and rockets. On September 1, one such mortar attack killed Ranger Anare Draiva, and mortally wounded Corporal Paul Muirhead of the Royal Irish Regiment.

On September 2, six more British troops were injured, and three days later, the Taliban once again tried to storm the base, but were repelled by the defenders with air support from Harriers and A-10s. On September 6, a casevac Chinook was flown into Musa Qala to evacuate two wounded soldiers who had suffered shrapnel wounds from mortar rounds, but the Taliban were expecting the move, and opened a heavy fire at the helicopter, forcing it to turn back. On returning to Camp Bastion, the crew found that their aircraft had been hit by four rounds, one of which had almost severed a rotor blade. Another casevac mission was flown into Musa Qala later the same day, but this time it was escorted by Apaches, A-10s and an AC-130 Spectre gunship that suppressed the Taliban, enabling the Chinook to complete its mission.

== The Musa Qala agreement ==
"[...]professionally, personally and morally I could not keep my troops in such constant danger without a viable casevac system."
Brigadier Ed Butler

Despite waging an effective defense, Easy Company's situation continued to deteriorate. During a period of 40 days, they had repelled over 100 attacks, but only six resupply flights were flown in during their stay, and they soon began to run low on ammunition. By September 8, the mortar team was down to thirty 81 mm rounds, and when the Minimi gunners ran out of link ammunition for their weapons, they were forced to spend long hours filling used belts with 5.56 mm rounds left over by the Danes.

Meanwhile, debate continued within the British command. Battle Group leader Brigadier Ed Butler was in favour of a rapid pullout from Musa Qala, as the coalition presence, in his view, created an intolerable liability. Intelligence reports suggested the Taliban had identified the base's dependence on helicopter resupply, and they would try and destroy one, thereby gaining a resounding propaganda victory. Such an event would also have a disastrous effect on British public opinion, which was already unfavourable to the Afghan mission. Butler expressed his views to the new Chief of the General Staff of the British Army Sir Richard Dannatt when he visited Afghanistan, and to the Permanent Joint Headquarters, who left him free to make his own decision. Accordingly, on September 8, Easy Company received news that they would be withdrawing in the next few days. However, the plan was met with strong opposition from General Richards, who perceived that an unconditional withdrawal would be interpreted by the insurgents as a historical success comparable to the 19th century battle of Maiwand, when a British brigade was defeated by Afghan forces near Kandahar. Richards believed Helmand's population would consider the British untrustworthy, and they would be encouraged to support the Taliban, if only to be on the winning side. Richards attempted to garner support from Sir Nigel Sheinwald, the Foreign Policy and Defence Adviser to the British prime minister, and from Sir Jock Stirrup, the Chief of the Defence Staff. The move was also opposed by the Afghan central government, who viewed the abandonment of Musa Qala as a disaster.

Eventually, the quandary was resolved by the inhabitants of Musa Qala themselves, who wished to end the hardships caused by the siege. Much of the town centre had been destroyed in the fighting, and most of the population had fled to nearby villages, preventing them from trading, collecting their crops, or sending their children to school. On August 26, a woman and her child were killed in the bazaar during a firefight. The town's elders blamed the Taliban and the coalition equally for their suffering. First they turned to the insurgents, and tried to persuade them that only negotiations could break the deadlock. The Taliban, who had suffered heavily in their unsuccessful attempts to capture the district centre, readily agreed. The elders then exposed their proposition to Governor Daoud, who passed it on to Brigadier Butler on September 12. The brigadier, after receiving confirmation that the insurgents were ready to accept the deal, ordered a cease-fire that took effect at 9:41 pm.

The following day, a delegation of 60 elders visited the district centre in order to discuss the situation with Major Adam Jowett. The visit convinced Jowett that their plan was serious, and in the afternoon, a shura took place in the desert west of Musa Qala. The British were represented by Brigadier Butler, and by a Foreign Office representative. The elders were accompanied by men dressed in black, that Butler identified as Taliban, but who stayed in the background and took no part in the discussion. General Richards had insisted that if the ceasefire held out for one month, both sides could then withdraw, and leave control of the town to its inhabitants. The elders agreed, and promised to supply the garrison with food and water.

At first, Easy Company did not have much confidence in the truce, and they continued to strengthen their defenses, but Musa Qala remained peaceful, allowing the inhabitants to return to their normal activities. A 14-point plan drawn up by Governor Daoud for handing over Musa Qala to the elders was gradually implemented. According to this plan, the flag of Afghanistan would continue to fly over the district centre, while the elders would select 60 members of their families to form a local police force, and they would permit reconstruction and development projects to continue.

The extraction of Easy company from Musa Qala took place on October 13, by which time the Helmand Task Force had been taken over by 3 Commando Brigade, and Ed Butler had been replaced by Brigadier Jerry Thomas. Ensuring the safety of the withdrawal became the first large-scale offensive operation for the newly-arrived commandos, codenamed Operation Omer. By arrangement with the elders, Easy Company were to be evacuated in Afghan "jingly" lorries, for which the elders had promised to guarantee safe passage, with an elder climbing onto each lorry. The operation went smoothly without a shot being fired, and the convoy was able to rendez-vous safely with the men of 42 Commando in the desert. The elders held a last shura with Major Jowett and Colonel Matt Holmes, the commanding officer of 42 Commando, who thanked them for their collaboration, and the permanent ISAF presence in Musa Qala came to an end.

== Reactions and aftermath ==
The ceasefire agreement drew significant criticism, not only in Afghanistan, but also among the ISAF leadership, where it was sometimes viewed as a major concession to the insurgency. Sayed Mustafa Kazemi, a member of the Afghan parliament and former member of the Afghan Northern Alliance that had fought the Taliban in the 1990s, called the plan a "model for the destruction of the country". Noorulhaq Olemi, another member of parliament, criticized the accord for weakening the central government and empowering traditional tribal leadership, thereby limiting the influence of democratic institutions in Afghanistan. American officials believed that the Taliban would capture Musa Qala as soon as coalition forces withdrew, and favoured a more aggressive approach to engaging with the insurgents. General Dan K. McNeill, who succeeded Richards as commander of the ISAF, voiced opposition to the deal. Conversely, the British presented the deal as a model of an "Afghan solution", and US criticism led to a strain in the relations between the two allies, that reached an all-time low over the issue. Many Afghan officials, like President Karzai himself, took a more guarded view, and supported the agreement while waiting to see if it would succeed.

The volatile situation of Helmand province, compounding foreign intervention, drug trafficking and tribal rivalries, eventually caused the fragile truce to unravel. The British did not retreat very far from Musa Qala, and continued to patrol around the town, regularly clashing with insurgent groups. In early 2007, the elders expelled Mullah Abdul Ghafour from the town. Later on, a coalition airstrike targeted Mullah Ghafour, killing his brother and 20 followers. Suspecting the elders had taken part in the attack, and determined to exact revenge, Mullah Ghafour led a group of 200–300 militants who stormed into the town on February 2. They disarmed the police, razed the government buildings to the ground and executed Hajji Shah Agha, the leader of the elders who had negotiated the truce with the coalition. On February 4, a coalition airstrike killed Mullah Ghafour and on February 14, another strike killed Mullah Manan, but the Taliban retained control of Musa Qala. They imposed their rule on the town, restricting women's movements, levying taxes and imposing conscription, while using Musa Qala as a base for operations in neighbouring districts. Beginning on December 7, 2007, the coalition launched an offensive, driving the insurgents from the area.

== See also ==
- Siege of Sangin
- Battle of Musa Qala
