= Helmand province campaign =

2006–2014 ISAF anti-Taliban military operations in southern Afghanistan

- Part of the War in Afghanistan (2001–2021) and the Taliban insurgency
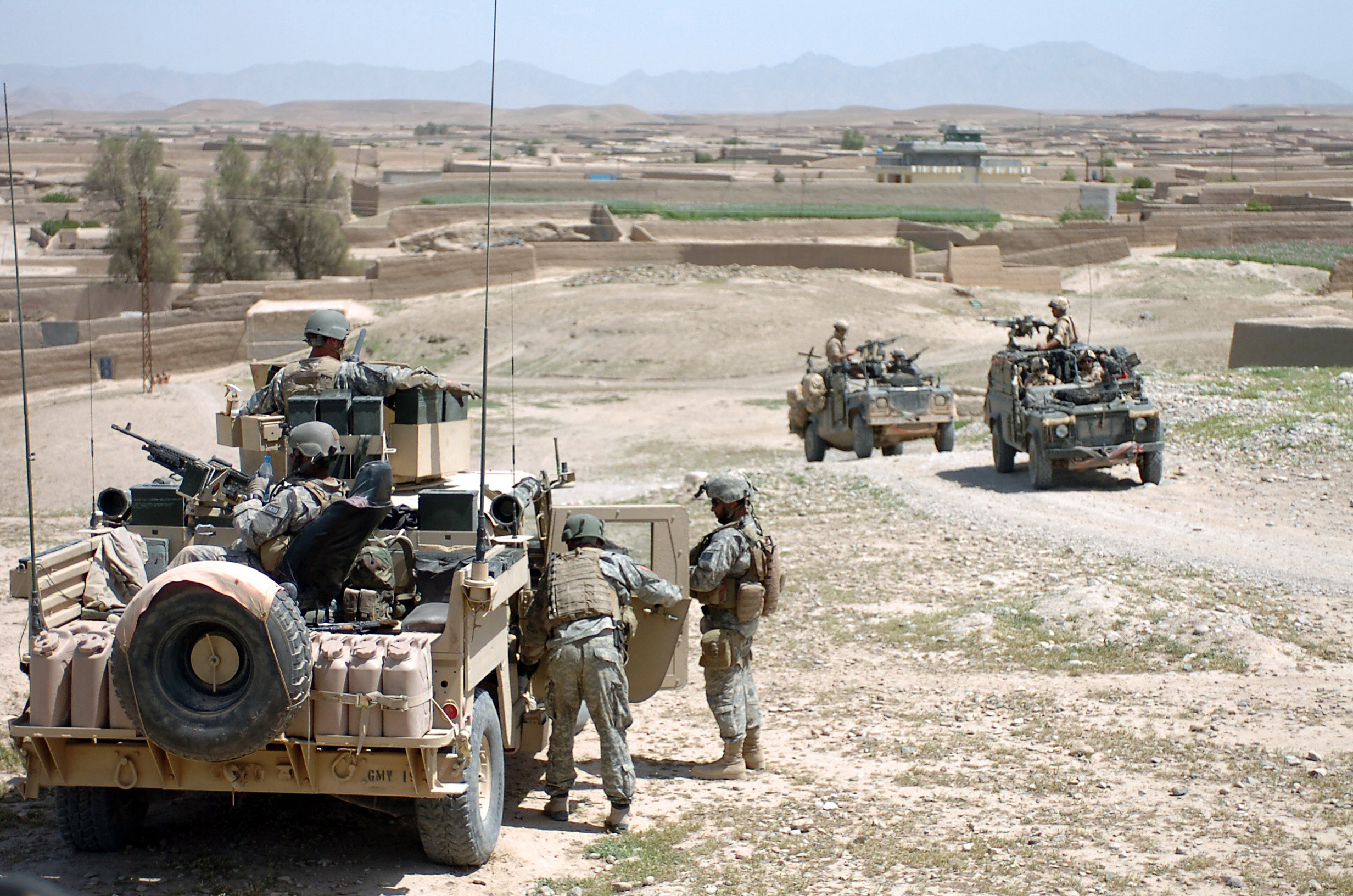
- American and British soldiers patrolling through a town in Helmand Province, 2007
Date	June 4, 2006 – 2014
Location	Helmand province, Afghanistan
Result	Both sides claim victory

Belligerents
ISAF List: United Kingdom; United States; Denmark; Canada; Georgia (2009–2014); Netherlands; Estonia; France; Albania; Islamic Republic of Afghanistan	(Afghanistan) Taliban Quetta Shura Local tribes and militias

Commanders and leaders
ISAF: Major General John A. Toolan; List: (United Kingdom) Task Force Helmand; Ed Butler / Charlie Knaggs; Jerry Thomas; John Lorimer; Andrew Mackay; Mark Carleton-Smith; Gordon Messenger; Tim Radford; James Cowan; (United States) Task Force Leatherneck; Lawrence D. Nicholson; (United States) Regional Command Southwest; Richard P. Mills; John A. Toolan; Islamic Republic of Afghanistan: Murad Ali Murad; Mohammad Gulab Mangal; List: Assadullah Wafa; Mahaiddin Ghori	(Afghanistan) Taliban: Mullah Abdul Ghani Baradar (POW); Mullah Dadullah †; Mullah Bakht Mohammed (POW); Mullah Akhtar Osmani †; Mullah Abdul Qassim; Mullah Abdul Ghafour †; Mullah Abdullah Zakir

Strength
ISAF 27,000 (July 2010) List: 9,500 (United Kingdom); 8,500 (United States); 1,561 (Georgia); 700 (Denmark); 500 (Canada); 200 (Netherlands); 100 (Estonia); Islamic Republic of Afghanistan 8,000 (ANA)	(Afghanistan) Taliban 8,000-9,000 (Taliban claim); 3,000 (independent estimate)

Casualties and losses
ISAF; 1,178 killed List: United States: 685 killed; United Kingdom: 415 killed; Denmark: 36 killed; Georgia: 26 killed; Estonia: 8 killed; Canada: 3 killed; France: 2 killed; Netherlands: 1 killed; Poland: 1 killed; Czech Republic: 1 killed; (Islamic Republic of Afghanistan) Islamic Republic of Afghanistan; 4,000 killed	Per US/Coalition Forces (Afghanistan) Taliban; 7,000 killed (2006-2008), 25,000 killed (2009-2014)

The Helmand province campaign was a series of military operations conducted by the International Security Assistance Force (ISAF) forces against Taliban insurgents and other local groups in the Helmand Province of Afghanistan. Their objective was to control a province that was known to be a Taliban stronghold, and a center of opium production. None of the ISAF's intended strategic and political objectives were achieved in the long term.

The deployment of international, mostly British, forces was part of the stage three expansion of the ISAF mandate, to cover the southern regions of Afghanistan. Until then Helmand province had seen only a limited coalition presence. The largest ISAF contributors other than the British to Task Force Helmand were Danish and Estonian troops.

In the spring of 2008, a battalion of U.S. Marines arrived to reinforce the British presence. In the spring of 2009, 11,000 additional Marines poured into the province, the first wave of President Obama's 21,000 troop surge into Afghanistan.

On June 19, 2009, the British Army (with ISAF and ANA forces) launched Operation Panther's Claw and on July 2, 2009, US Marines launched Operation Khanjar, both major offensives into the province in hopes of securing the region before the Afghanistan presidential elections and turning the tide of the insurgency there.

== Prelude ==
In 2006, a revitalised Taliban conducted a number of large-scale military offensives against coalition troops in Helmand, Kandahar, and other provinces on the border with Pakistan.

In Helmand, the Afghan government only had a tenuous hold outside the provincial capital of Lashkar Gah. This was largely a consequence of President Hamid Karzai's policy of dismantling the local tribal militias, which had previously enforced the will of the tribal power brokers. Consequently, maintaining order fell primarily to local police forces, who lacked the necessary resources to enforce government authority effectively.

Out of the 1,900 police forces in Helmand, many were stationed in the district centres of larger cities, unable to confront the Taliban in rural areas. Additionally, these police forces were poorly equipped, with inadequate training and equipped with light weaponry. It was reported that only about 15% of the police had functional Kalashnikov assault rifles. The police chief of Lashkar Gah acknowledged that the police force was ill-prepared for the high-risk nature of their duties. Western journalists often observed young policemen smoking opium, and international trainers noted that morale was low.

The NATO presence in the province was also sparse, limited to 130 American soldiers undertaking punctual anti-terrorist missions, as part of Operation Enduring Freedom. Through the month of April, a new British unit, the Helmand Task Force, was deployed in order to counter the Taliban. The core of the fighting force was drawn from the 16th Air Assault Brigade, and in particular from the 3rd battalion, of the Parachute Regiment. Based at Camp Bastion, then under construction, the task force numbered 3,300 men, though only a third of these were combat troops.

During the first four months of its presence in Afghanistan, the Helmand Task Force was expected to take part in Operation Enduring Freedom, and help track down Taliban and Al Qaeda extremists. It was thus placed under the command of U.S. Major General Benjamin Freakley, commander of the Combined Joint Task Force 76. But being part of ISAF, it was also answerable to the ISAF Regional Command South, then led by a Canadian, Brigadier General David Fraser. This tangled chain of command was accompanied by a certain difficulty in defining the priority between two different and sometimes contradictory missions: either to win the support of the local population, or to fight and eliminate the Taliban.

== Outposts under siege ==
The initial mission of the Helmand Task Force was to carry out reconstruction and hearts and minds projects in the relatively safe area known as "the triangle", centered around Lashkar Gah and Gereshk. However, the intensification of Taliban attacks led to a dramatic change in this strategy. On February 3, 2006, Taliban fighters under the leadership of Mullah Dadullah launched simultaneous attacks against the district centres of Musa Qala, Sangin, and Now Zad. While the local police forces and Afghan army battalions managed to repel these attacks with the support of US advisors, they suffered 34 casualties, significantly higher than even the 18 Taliban deaths that the Afghan government claimed to have inflicted in the exchange. In early spring Baghran District fell temporarily under insurgent control, on April 30 an ANA convoy was hit by an IED on the outskirts of Greshk, killing four Afghan soldiers, and on May 18, a Taliban raid in Musa Qala killed some twenty Afghan policemen. As Taliban attacks persisted throughout Helmand, the morale of the Afghan government forces began to collapse, and the auxiliary police units deserted in several districts. Observing the apparent weakness of the central government, many local tribesmen began to defect and join the Taliban.

The possibility of a Taliban offensive sweeping over the entire province was taken seriously by the provincial governor, Mohammad Daoud, a personal ally and appointee of President Hamid Karzai. Daoud insisted that ISAF troops be deployed in the districts that were under immediate threat of Taliban attack: Sangin, Now Zada, and Musa Qala.

In mid-May, Dadullah launched another series of coordinated attacks on district centres in northern Helmand. Around the same time, approximately 3,150 British troops from the 16th Air Assault Brigade, led by Brigadier Ed Butler, began arriving in the province. Despite being referred to as a "brigade," it consisted of only one battalion, the 3rd Battalion, Parachute Regiment, also known as "3 Para."

British soldiers flew into the district centres of Now Zad, Musa Qala, and Kajaki, the latter being important because it overlooked the strategic Kajaki Dam. Brigadier Butler could only allocate one platoon (30 men) to each location. These platoons set up fortified posts, which became known as "platoon houses." This was the beginning of the controversial platoon house strategy, that saw ISAF troops, mostly British, tied down in remote outstations across northern Helmand. All posts attracted sustained and intensive Taliban attacks, and remained under siege for long periods. The besieged district centres had to be supplied by air, as ground resupply missions were perilous. To make matters more challenging, the British forces had only seven Chinook transport helicopters available and had to be careful not to lose any, despite frequently encountering heavy enemy fire during landings. The Task Force's limited assets became dangerously stretched, leading to difficult situations in several cases.

=== Sangin ===
The town of Sangin (population 30,000), is an important trading center of southern Afghanistan, and is believed to be the biggest opium market in the region. Thus it naturally became an important objective both for the Taliban and the coalition.

Unlike Musa Qala, where the attacking Taliban mainly came from neighbouring districts, in Sangin, most of the insurgents were locals. This was due to internal tribal rivalries that the Taliban exploited to stoke resistance against the government. Sangin was primarily inhabited by two main tribes: the Alikozai and the Ishakzai. The Alikozai tribesmen occupied influential positions in the district since 2001. They held the district governorship, and enjoyed top jobs in the district administration. The Ishakzai tribesmen, on the other hand, had suffered mistreatment, particularly from Dad Mohammed, an Alikozai tribal leader who also served as the head of the Afghan secret police in Sangin. Under his leadership, the Alikozai had "used the cover of their government positions to tax, harass and steal from the Ishakzai." When Dadullah launched his attack, the Ishakzai naturally aligned themselves with the Taliban. By mid-June 2006, Sangin was believed to be largely under insurgent control.

On June 18, 2006, Jama Gul, a former district chief, was ambushed and killed in Sangin, along with four bodyguards. When a group of his relatives went to retrieve the bodies, 25 of them were killed. It was this incident, sometimes described as "face-off between two drug lords", that led to the deployment of ISAF troops in Sangin. On June 21, a company of British paratroopers moved into the town, ostensibly to rescue the son of the current district chief, who had been wounded in the fight. However, after a personal intervention by Hamid Karzai, they were ordered to remain in Sangin, in order to assert the faltering authority of the central government.

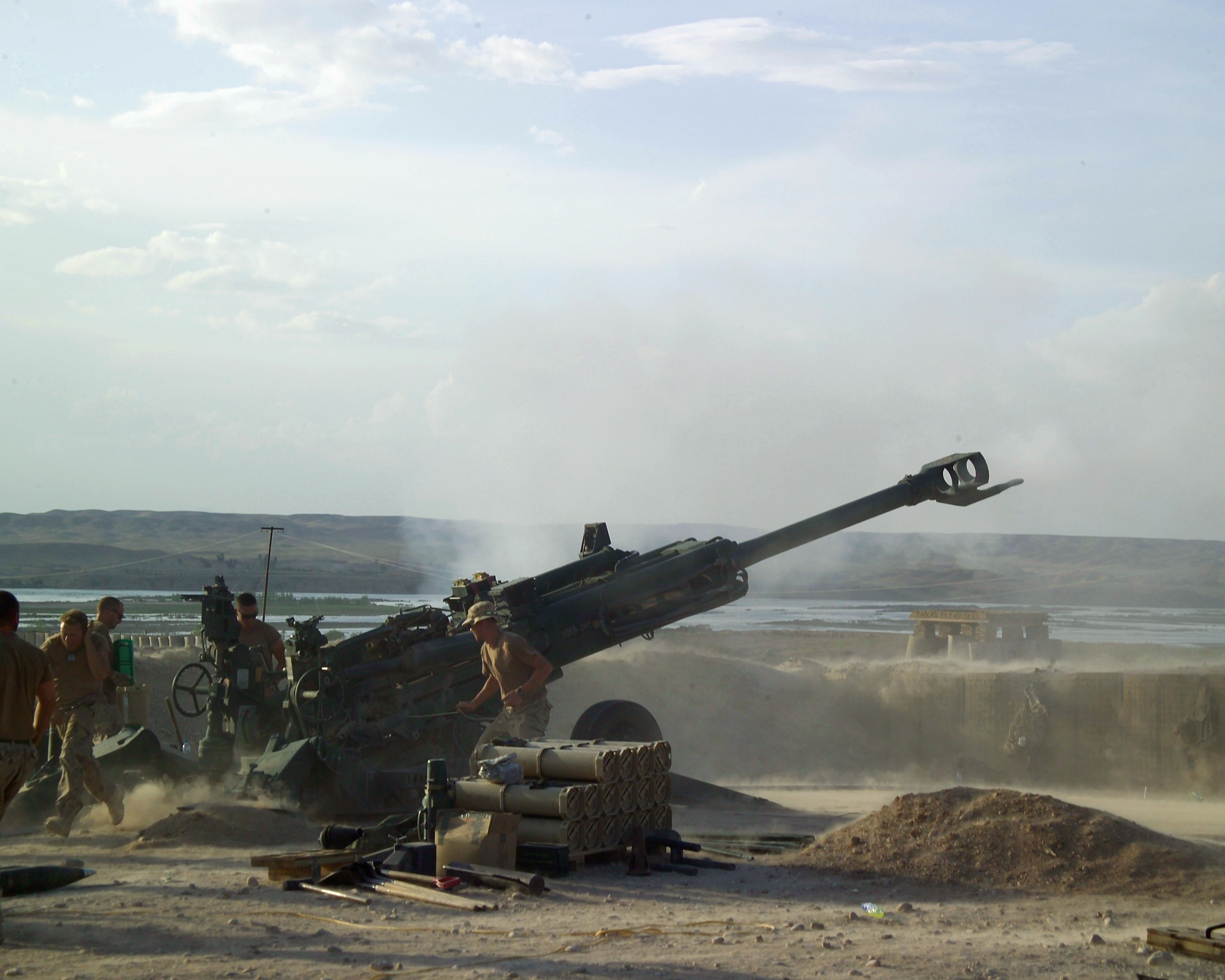
Canadian M777 howitzer firing at Taliban positions in Sangin.

At first, the situation inside the town remained calm, but this changed after June 27, after a failed special forces raid in the Sangin area, during which two British soldiers were killed while attempting to capture four Taliban militants. The On June 30, the insurgents launched their first frontal attacks on the district centre, garrisoned by British troops. The attackers were driven off, after having lost at least twelve killed. Despite this, the Taliban did not relent, and renewed their attacks every night, using small arms, RPGs, and 107 mm rockets. The British answered with machine guns, mortars and Javelin missiles, and by calling in artillery and airstrikes. Resupply was sometimes interrupted for as long as five days, as Taliban fire would have put the helicopters at risk.

On July 15, as part of Operation Mountain Thrust coalition forces conducted an offensive into Sangin district, supported by armour, in the shape of light tanks of the Household Cavalry Regiment and Canadian LAV IIIs. In the face of overwhelming force, most of the Taliban retreated, and a supply convoy was escorted into the town. The garrison were able to strengthen their defenses after the arrival of an engineer unit.

After September 14, the fighting died down in Sangin. On September 21, the paratroopers occupying the government compound were replaced by a unit from 42 Commando, Royal Marines. In March 2007, the Marines were in turn replaced by a company from the 2nd Battalion, Royal Regiment of Fusiliers. By this time, the Taliban had resumed their operations in the sector, and the fusiliers were attacked 79 times during their first twenty days in Sangin.

On April 5, 2007, coalition forces launched Operation Silver, as part of the wider Operation Achilles, with some 1,000 troops. After giving advance warning of their offensive, they advanced into Sangin, which had been mostly abandoned by the insurgents. The new governor of Helmand Assadullah Wafa, was able to install a new district governor, and ISAF claimed to have pacified the town.

=== Musa Qala ===
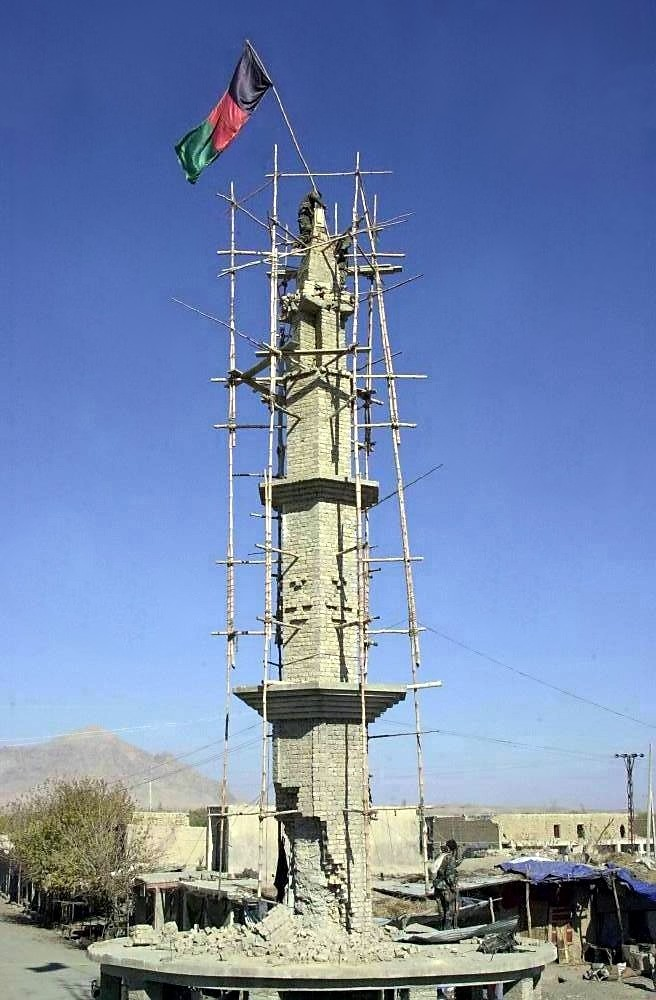
An Afghan flag was raised at the highest point in Musa Qalah, Afghanistan on Dec. 11, 2007 after Afghan National Security Forces, along with Coalition forces, retook the town from insurgent forces following several days of combat.

After May 18, 2006, coalition troops were deployed in Musa Qala, to defend the district centre. Serving also as a prison and police station, the district centre was situated in the middle of the town, a situation that greatly hampered the defenders. The garrison consisted of some 80 Afghan policemen, who were more of a militia than a police force, and were very unpopular among the local population.

The American unit present in Musa Qala was replaced on June 14 by a composite group of British troops, mostly pathfinders. The first heavy Taliban attack was launched on July 16, and though it was repelled with heavy loss, the insurgents maintained a constant pressure on the district centre. On July 26, the Danish 1 Light Reconnaissance Squadron, known as "the griffins", arrived at Musa Qala to relieve the British troops. However, these could not be extracted until August 8, when a full battle group operation, codenamed Operation Snakebite, was required to reach the town centre. The griffins were equipped with 16 Eagle armoured vehicles, one lost during the fight to get in the town, most armed with a .50 calibre machine-gun. Their commander built a series of ramps enabling the vehicles to fire over the compound walls. With the support of a mortar team from the Royal Irish Regiment and abundant air support, the Musa Qala garrison was able to drive back all attacks, but the presence of large numbers of Taliban prevented them from venturing out of the base. On the 24 August, the Danish unit were extracted and assigned to the Canadian-led Op Medusa, the Danes were replaced by a mixed British detachment of paratroopers and Royal Irish rangers, whose weapons array was considerably less powerful, having only two .50 cal and eight GPMG machine-guns. Knowing the garrison was weaker, the Taliban launched two attacks with a group of 150 men on August 26/27. Both were driven off, after which the insurgents concentrated on indirect attacks with mortars and 107 mm rockets.

By the end of September, the fighting in Musa Qala had come to a stalemate. The Taliban had suffered heavy losses and had been incapable of driving the ISAF forces out of the town. The coalition had also suffered losses: three British soldiers had been killed in Musa Qala, and their control of the town didn't extend outside the compound walls. Also, the British commanders feared that a resupply helicopter might be shot down, giving a propaganda victory to the insurgents. Both sides welcomed an initiative by the town elders, to negotiate a truce and avoid further bloodshed. The British agreed to withdraw from the city, and in return, the tribesmen would deny sanctuary to the Taliban.

Brigadier Butler insisted on 30 days of peace before withdrawing his forces. The elders agreed and stayed true to their word, and no further attacks occurred for the next month. Due to the inaccessibility of Musa Qala by British vehicles, local "Jingle Trucks" transported the British garrison out of the town on October 7. The agreement lasted 143 days, ending after the brother of a local Taliban leader, Mullah Abdul Ghaffour, was killed by an airstrike from an American B-1 bomber. The Taliban claimed this had occurred in an area covered by the truce. In retaliation a group of 200-300 insurgents stormed the town on February 1, 2007, executing the elder who had brokered the truce, and jailing several others. On February 4, Mullah Abdul Ghaffour himself was killed in an airstrike. On the same day, General David J. Richards, who had supported the truce, was replaced at the head of ISAF by General Dan K. McNeill, who favoured a more aggressive approach.

In Musa Qala, the Taliban imposed their fundamentalist interpretation of Muslim law, closing down schools, restricting women's movements, levying heavy taxes, and hanging those inhabitants they suspected of being spies. The Afghan government and the coalition refrained from retaking the town, to avoid causing civilian casualties.

=== Kajaki dam ===
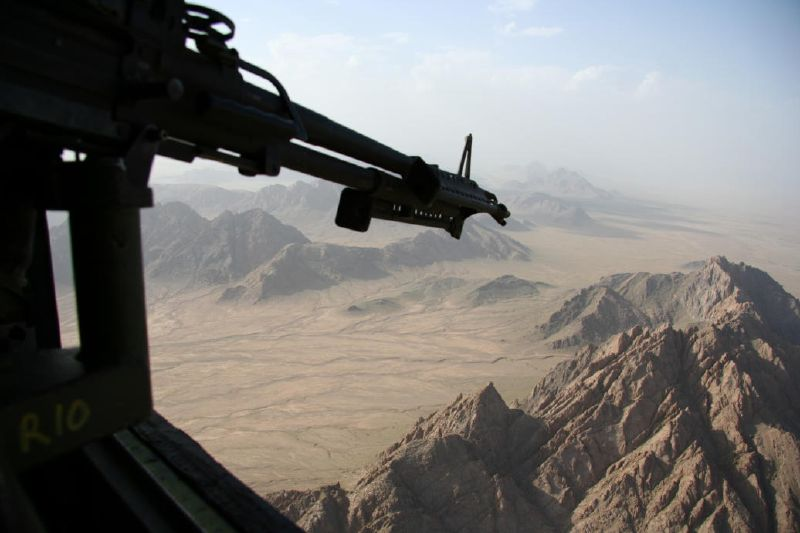
View from a Chinook helicopter over Kajaki district.

The Kajaki dam is a particularly important installation, providing water for irrigation in the Helmand Valley, and electricity for the whole province. Through early 2006, it came under increasing attacks by the Taliban, for whom even a brief occupation would serve as a propaganda victory. The dam was defended by a mixed force of Afghan policemen and security guards led by an American contractor. Nightly Taliban mortar attacks demoralised the defenders, who had no heavy weapons, and were unable to retaliate. In late June, a team of British paratroopers was deployed near Kajaki, and managed to ambush a Taliban mortar team, killing ten and wounding two. Thereafter, a permanent British military presence was established at the dam, where coalition troops occupied a series of fortified posts built by the Soviets during their presence in Afghanistan. The Taliban grew more cautious, but continued their harassment attacks throughout July and the first half of August.

In February 2007, British marines from 42 commando conducted Operation Volcano, clearing a safe zone around the dam and driving the Taliban out of mortar range. The main Taliban fortified position in the village of Barikju was cleared without casualties.

Since then, the situation around the dam has stabilised. Kajaki is one of the rare occasions during the Afghanistan war where both sides use fixed positions, and an actual front line has developed.

== NATO counter-offensive ==
In April 2007, the number of British troops in southern Afghanistan was increased from 3,300 to 5,800 men. Heavier equipment was also deployed, namely Warrior IFVs, Mastiff protected vehicles and GMLRS multiple rocket launchers. The new task force commander, Brigadier John Lorimer, also requested that Challenger 2 tanks and AS-90 self-propelled guns be deployed, but these were refused.

On March 6, Coalition forces began a series of large-scale operations, to systematically clear the entire province of enemy forces.

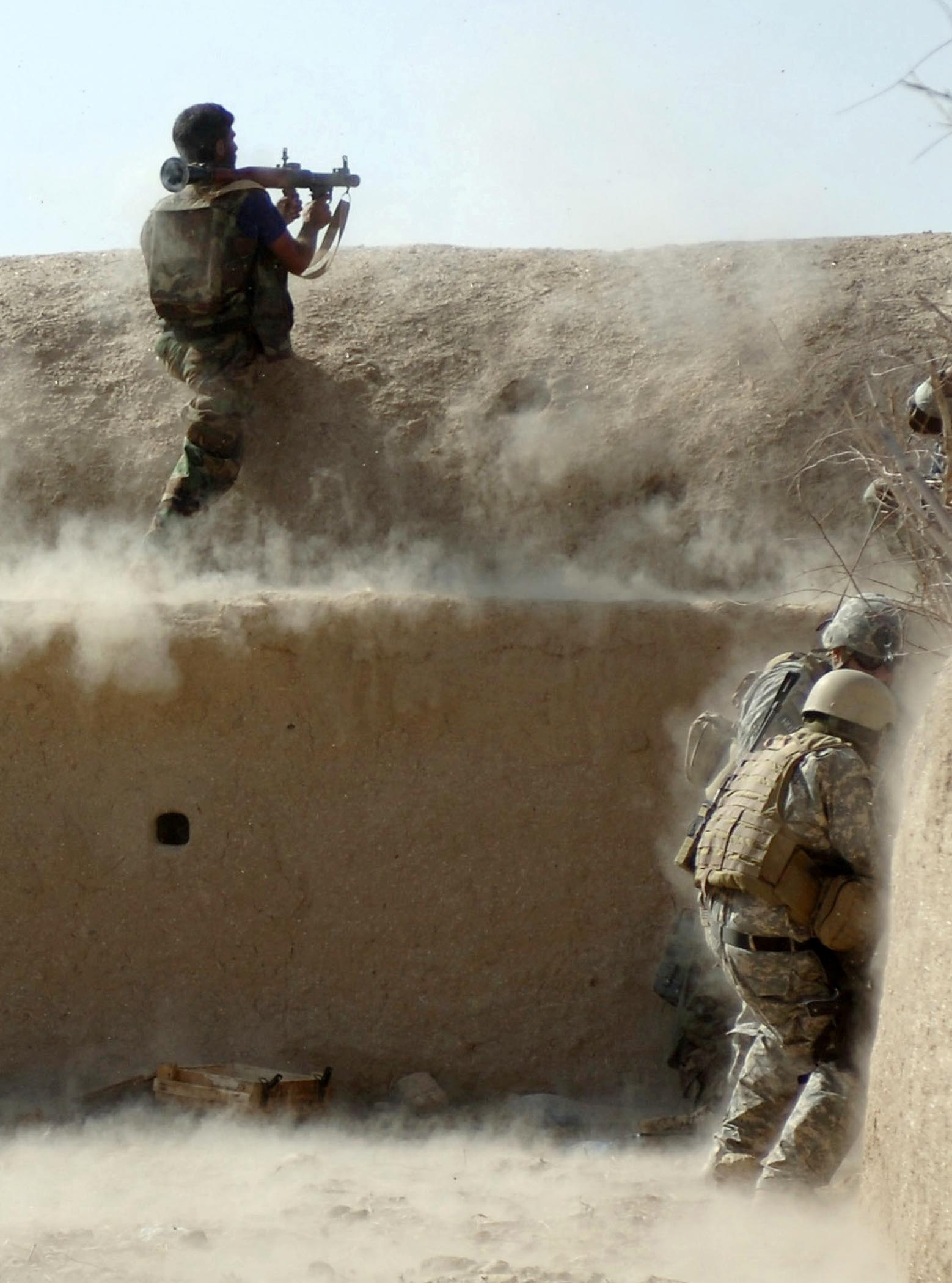
ANA and U.S. forces battling the Taliban in Sangin on April 18, 2007.

=== Operation Achilles ===
Operation Achilles was the first task force-level operation to be conducted by NATO forces in the battle for Helmand. More than 4,500 British led ISAF troops were involved, along with 1,000 Afghan personnel. NATO officials reported that, contrary to what happened in previous operations, Taliban fighters were avoiding direct confrontation in favor of guerilla tactics. The main objectives were the strategic points of Northern Helmand, including all major towns, and the Kajaki dam.

A number of sub-operations targeted specific sectors:

- Operation Kryptonite (February 12): Some 300 British and Dutch ISAF and ANA troops cleared the area from where the Taliban had mortared the dam in the past months. On February 14, a senior Taliban leader, Mullah Manan, was killed in an airstrike between Kajaki and Musa Qala.
- Operation Silver (April 5): A 1,000-strong group composed of a heliborne force of U.S. paratroopers from the 82nd Airborne Division, along with an armoured column of 250 Royal Marines, 100 Dutch air assault troops( Tiger CoY) cleared the town of Sangin, that had been mostly abandoned by the Taliban.
- Operation Silicon (April 30): This operation was undertaken jointly by 1st Battalion The Royal Anglian Regiment (The Vikings) and ANA troops, moving against the Taliban in Gereshk and the lower Sangin valley.

On May 12, Mullah Dadullah, second in command of the Taliban, was killed in Gereshk district, in a raid carried out by British SBS commandos and Afghan troops. A significant feature of the operation was the end of the siege of Sangin where British troops had been cut off for more than nine months. This time, coalition forces built a number of patrol bases, manned by British troops and Afghan security forces, establishing a permanent presence in areas from where the Taliban had been expelled. Achilles ended on May 30, with the result that NATO forces managed to establish a foothold in enemy territory in Helmand.

=== Operation Lastay Kulang ===
On the same day that Achilles ended operation Lastay Kulang, meaning "Pickaxe-Handle" in Pashto, started. This operation was not as successful as the previous one. At around 4:00 local time on Wednesday, May 30, 2007, ISAF and ANSF personnel advanced towards the village of Kajaki Sofle, ten kilometres south-west of the town of Kajaki, to remove a Taliban force whose presence threatened the security and stability of the Lower Sangin Valley.

During the night, elements of the American 82nd Airborne Division mounted an aerial assault on a Taliban compound. One of the Chinook helicopters taking part in the raid was apparently hit by an RPG round and crashed, killing five Americans, a Briton and a Canadian on board. Lastay Kulang ended on June 14, with the strategic outcome unclear. NATO stated that their forces cleared Sangin and Gereshk of Taliban and thus secured the Kajaki District. In contrast, the Taliban claimed that they still control much of Kajaki, and some of the Sangin districts. These claims were confirmed by the local residents, who complain that the Taliban returned as soon as NATO and ANA troops had left.

=== Operation Hammer ===
In late July another operation was started called Operation Hammer. It began in the early hours of July 24, 2007 in the area between Hyderabad and Mirmandab, north-east of Gereshk. The operation continued the momentum towards expelling Taliban forces from areas of the Upper Gereshk Valley in Helmand province. During the initial stages of the operation, ISAF and Afghan National Security Forces advanced to secure a strategic bridge crossing over the Nahr-e-Seraj canal, clearing and searching compounds, before military engineers from 26 Engineer Regiment established a joint forward operating base. Sporadic fighting followed after that. And by early November operations ended with coalition troops establishing a firm frontline south of the Helmand river and were preparing for an attack towards Musa Qalah, which had been under Taliban control for eight months.

=== Operation Sledgehammer Hit ===
Operation Palk Wahel (Sledgehammer Hit in Pashto) involved 2,500 troops, of which 2,000 are British, drawn mostly from the 1st battalion, the Royal Gurkha Rifles and from 2nd Battalion the Mercian Regiment. During this operation, Warrior IFVs, manned by the Scots Guards, made their first significant operational deployment in Afghanistan. Most of the remaining 500 men came from the Afghan National Army, while small contingents from Danish, Czech and American forces also participated.

The objective of the operation was to dislodge the Taliban insurgents from their strongholds in the upper Gereshk valley.

The operation began on September 19, when Sappers from 36 Engineer Regiment threw a bridge over the Helmand river. During the early stages, coalition troops encountered heavy resistance and had to clear several compounds in close-quarter combat. An estimated 100 Taliban and at least six civilians were killed. Three British soldiers were also killed: two in an accident and one by an IED.

=== Battle of Musa Qala ===
On November 1, 2007, 40 Commando Royal Marines pushed north in Viking armoured vehicles, driving across the Helmand river north of Sangin, creating a bridgehead for the Scots Guards convoy. There has been on and off contact with the Taliban who have attacked British forces with rockets, mortars and rocket-propelled grenades (RPGs). Having established positions around Musa Qalah, British troops have been carrying out reconnaissance patrols. The main focus of current operations is to disrupt and confuse the Taliban and destabilize their supply routes.

The town had become a major Taliban drug trafficking station and had been considered to be of symbolic importance to both sides, to the Taliban in the sense that they can take and hold ground in Afghanistan in defiance of the Afghan government and NATO.

On December 6, 2007, British, Afghan and U.S. forces started their assault on the town. Initially the British and Afghan forces attacked in the afternoon, from three directions. Several hundred US troops were later dropped from helicopters and fought on foot through the night. The Taliban defences included hundreds of mines and it was reported that the morale among the Taliban forces was high. Up to 2,000 Taliban fighters were confirmed to be in the town. One British soldier, 12 Taliban fighters and two civilian children were killed on the first day of the operation.

By December 8, 2007, NATO troops captured two villages south of the town and advanced to within two kilometers from the outskirts. The Taliban were withdrawing to their defences in the town and more Taliban reinforcements were pouring into the district. The biggest problem for the coalition were mines. Both of the two fatalities sustained by the coalition at that point were the result of land mines.

On December 10, the Taliban withdrew their forces northwards into the mountains and Afghan troops entered the town, meeting little resistance. Two Taliban leaders were reportedly captured during the battle.

On December 12, the town finally fell to advancing coalition forces.

== Escalation ==
=== Stalemate in the south ===
By the end of December 2007, the situation on the ground reached a stalemate. A de facto border was established east of Garmsir along the banks of the Helmand River that divided British-held from Taliban-held territory. The British were outnumbered by the larger Taliban force which was receiving reinforcements. However the British had jets and heavy artillery on their side. Both forces were fighting in the coming months for mere yards of territory.

=== U.S. Marine reinforcements to Garmsir and North Helmand ===
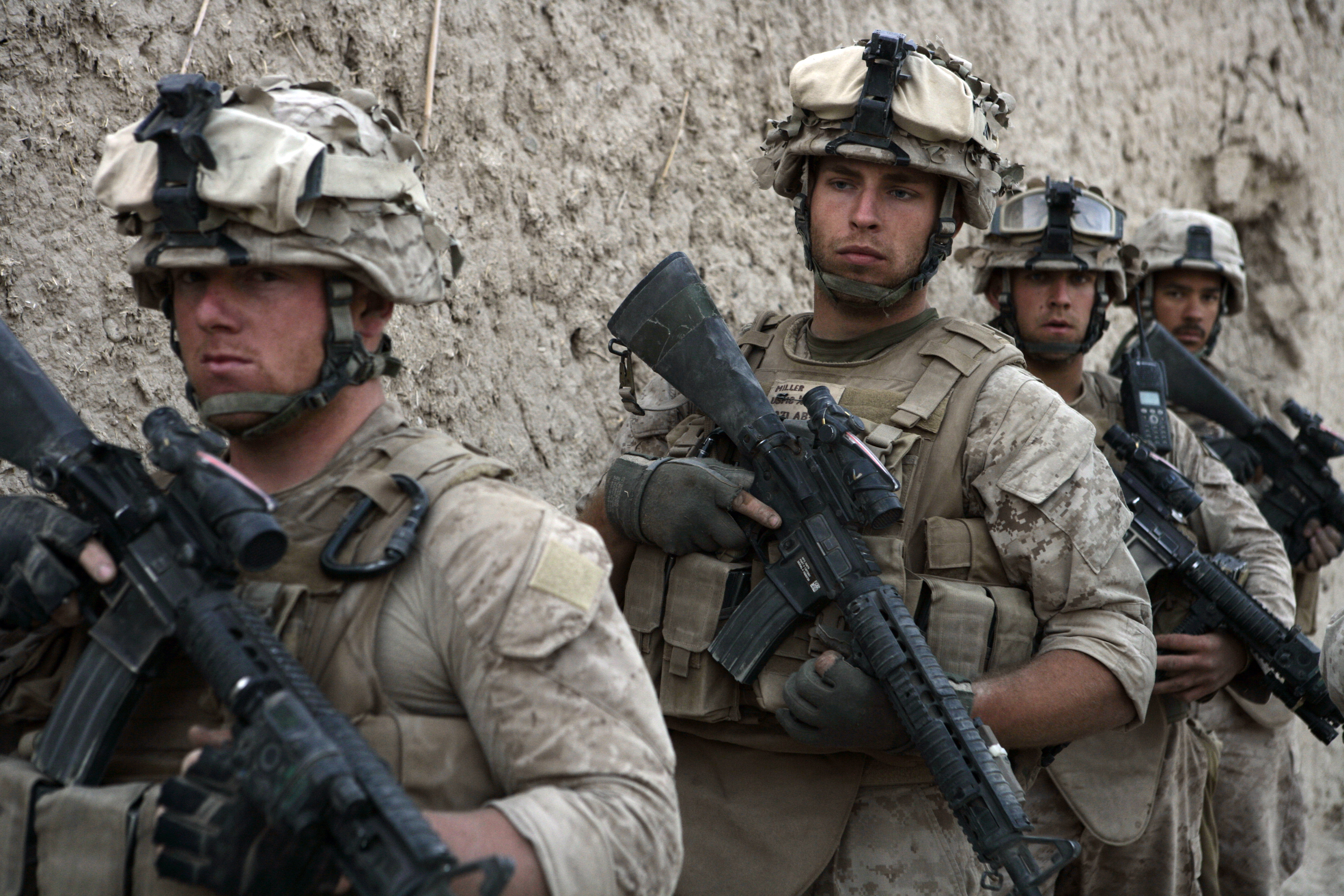
Marines with Bravo 1/6, 24th MEU fighting in Garmsir, Afghanistan.

In early April 2008, a battalion of U.S. Marines were sent to Helmand to aid NATO forces in the fight.

1st Battalion, 6th Marines, the battalion landing team for the 24th MEU started their combat operations with an attack on the Taliban-held town of Garmsir on April 28. The operation was carried out in conjunction with British troops of the 16 Air Assault Brigade. Taliban forces however had withdrawn from the town and taken up position further south.

After seizing Garmsir, the Marines pushed further south into an area where the insurgents had built bunkers and tunnels capable of withstanding coalition airstrikes. They ran into stiff resistance and the operation, expected to take a few days, lasted more than a month to complete. This alerted the ISAF commander that the town was important to the insurgents, so he ordered the Marines to remain in the area, rather than clear the town and leave. He was also concerned that the Taliban would emerge after the Marines left, falsely claiming that they had run ISAF forces off. With the original mission changed, the Marines transitioned from combat operations to civil operations. The 24th MEU commander Colonel Peter Petronzio focused on protecting the local Afghans as they began to return to their homes after having been displaced by the Taliban. The Marines also continued their combat operations in the area, killing more than 400 insurgents between April and July 2008, according to governor Gulab Mangal.

On September 8, the 24th MEU returned control of Garmsir to British forces, after having operated in the area for approximately 130 days.

As the MEU deployed to Garmsir, 2nd Battalion, 7th Marines deployed elements to Sangin, Gereshk, Musa Qaleh and Now Zad, as well as districts in Farah Province. The Battalion worked closely with the Afghan National Police and the Combined Security Transition Command – Afghanistan in implementing police training and reform programs. Despite being deployed independent of the 24th MEU or any other Marine Air-Ground Task Force, the Battalion was engaged in heavy fighting throughout the tour. As a sign of the United States' increased troop commitment to Afghanistan, 2/7 was relieved by 3rd Battalion, 8th Marines and the Special Purpose MAGTF – Afghanistan in December 2008.

=== Operation Eagle's Eye ===
In May and June 2008, Operation Oqab Sturga (Eagle's Eye) was launched. The successful operation involved British troops from The Parachute Regiment and the Argyll and Sutherland Highlanders (5 Scots) and Afghan National Army and Danish troops, backed up by British artillery and Apache helicopters.

The operations aims were to disrupt Taliban activities in the Upper Gereshk Valley, between the towns of Gereshk and Sangin, and strengthen the Afghan government's control of the Musa Qaleh Wadi. Resistance from the Taliban was limited to indirect fire and improvised explosive devices, the Taliban avoiding direct confrontations with coalition forces.

It was reported that a British helicopter killed a key Taliban leader called 'Sadiqullah' and up to ten members of his cell on 26 June 2008. They were said to be responsible for roadside bomb and suicide attacks against NATO and Afghan forces. The attack took place 10 kilometres north west of Kajaki in Helmand.

=== Taliban spring offensive ===
At the beginning of June the Taliban launched a new offensive despite Coalition claims that they were unable to do that. Most of the heavy fighting was concentrated in the province of Kandahar, where the Taliban set free 1,100 prisoners from the main prison in Kandahar City, on the border with Pakistan, in the province of Farah to the west and in Helmand. Between June 8 and June 24, a total of 14 foreign soldiers were killed in a surge of attacks in Helmand.

=== Kajaki Dam convoy ===
Late August saw one of the largest operations by NATO forces in Helmand province, with the aim bringing electricity to the region. A convoy of 100 vehicles took five days to move massive sections of an electric turbine for the Kajaki Dam, covering 180 km (112 miles). The operation involved 2,000 British troops, 1,000 other NATO troops from Australia, Canada, Denmark and the US and 1,000 Afghan soldiers. The Canadians covered the first leg and the British took over at a meeting point in the desert, using 50 BVS10 Viking armoured vehicles to escort the convoy. Hundreds of special forces troops went in first, sweeping the area and although difficult to verify, British commanders estimated more than 200 insurgents were killed - without any losses or injuries to NATO soldiers. British, Dutch, French and US aircraft, helicopters and unmanned drones provided aerial reconnaissance and fire support.

=== Taliban attack on Lashkar Gah ===
In August 2008, the Taliban began operating closer to the provincial capital of Lashkar Gah, attacking government positions in Marja (town) and Nad Ali Districts, just 10 kilometers from the city. The local authorities were at first reluctant to call for help from ISAF forces, for fear their intervention might cause civilian casualties. In September, after both districts had fallen to the Taliban, British Army officials said these setbacks were caused by the defection of pro-government militias linked to local drug-trafficking mafias, that the Taliban had promised to protect from poppy-eradication programs.

On October 12, 2008, a force of around 200 Taliban launched a direct attack on Lashkar Gah, their most ambitious operation since 2006. The attack on the town came from three sides, and involved hundreds of militants using rockets and mortars. The Taliban forces were intercepted in the outskirts of the city by Afghan troops supported by Army Air Corps Apache gunships. The attack was repulsed, and the Taliban suffered 50 killed according to NATO, or 62 killed according to local authorities, including their leader, Mullah Qudratullah, while coalition forces suffered no casualties. On October 15, 2008, another Taliban force staged an attack. 18 Taliban were killed and the attack was once again repulsed. However, this time six Afghan policemen were killed at a checkpoint just north of the city. On October 16, 2008, militants pressed with their attacks bombarding the city with rockets. One of them hit a market killing one civilian and wounding five others. At the same time, a NATO air strike in the neighboring district left 18 civilians from five families dead.

=== Operation Red Dagger ===
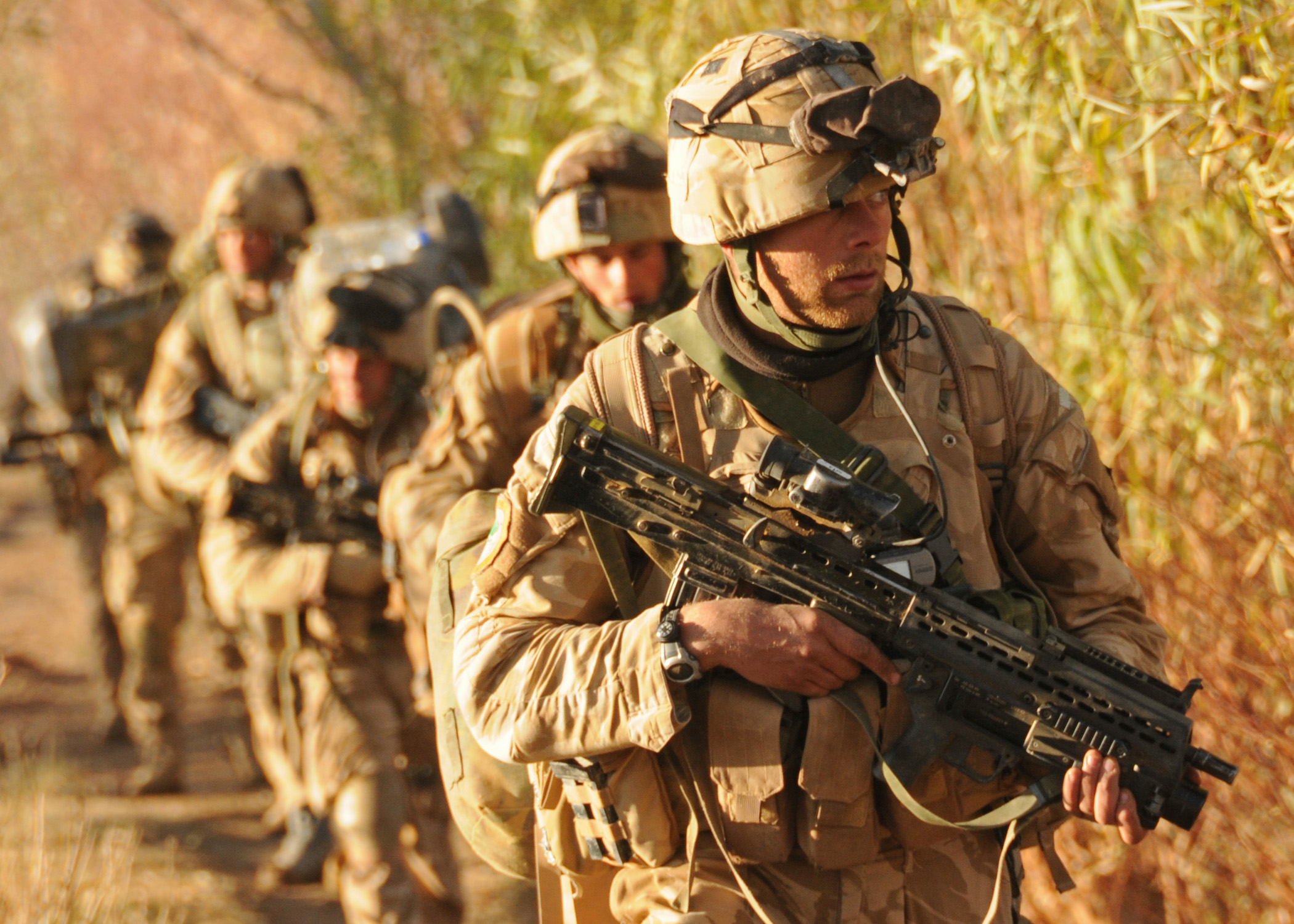
British commandos during Operation Sond Chara.

Between December 7 and December 25, 2008, British forces conducted Operation Red Dagger around the town of Nad-e-Ali in an attempt to capture four key Taliban strongholds. More than 1,500 troops were involved. The operation saw fierce trench battles reminiscent of the First World War and in knee-deep mud. British soldiers were involved every day in intense fire-fights that lasted from a few minutes to four hours at a range as close as 30 metres. British Marines at one point fought hand-to-hand in a "360-degree battle". Also involved in the fighting were Danish, Estonian and Afghan troops. The operation culminated in a battle on Christmas Day. The operation was declared a success, 100 Taliban fighters were killed, including a senior commander, at a cost of five British Royal Marines being killed.

=== Operation Blue Sword ===
On March 19, Coalition troops carried out Operation Aabi Toorah ("Blue Sword") into Marjah District, which was considered a Taliban "safe haven" where the insurgents trained and stored weapons and supplies. Coalition forces consisted of 500 Royal Marines, 120 Danish soldiers accompanied by ANA troops, for a total force of 700. The operation began with the prepositioning of Danish Leopard tanks and British armoured vehicles, which was followed by an air assault by 500 Marines of 42 Commando into the insurgent-controlled area. During three days, the Coalition forces, supported by Apache and Cobra helicopters, Dutch F-16s and UAVs, cleared Taliban compounds, which involved fighting at close quarters. Two Royal Marines were injured during the operation, while Taliban losses were estimated by local officials at 80-90 killed. Other estimates were 130 killed and 200-300 injured.

=== Operation Diesel ===
The operation during February was a raid against a Taliban drug factory and arms stronghold in the Upper Sangin Valley in Helmand Province carried out prinipically by the British Royal Marines.

=== Operation Mar Lewe ===
During late May the operation was to attack Taliban positions south of Musa Qaleh.

== Coalition 2009 Spring offensive ==
=== Operation Panther's Claw ===
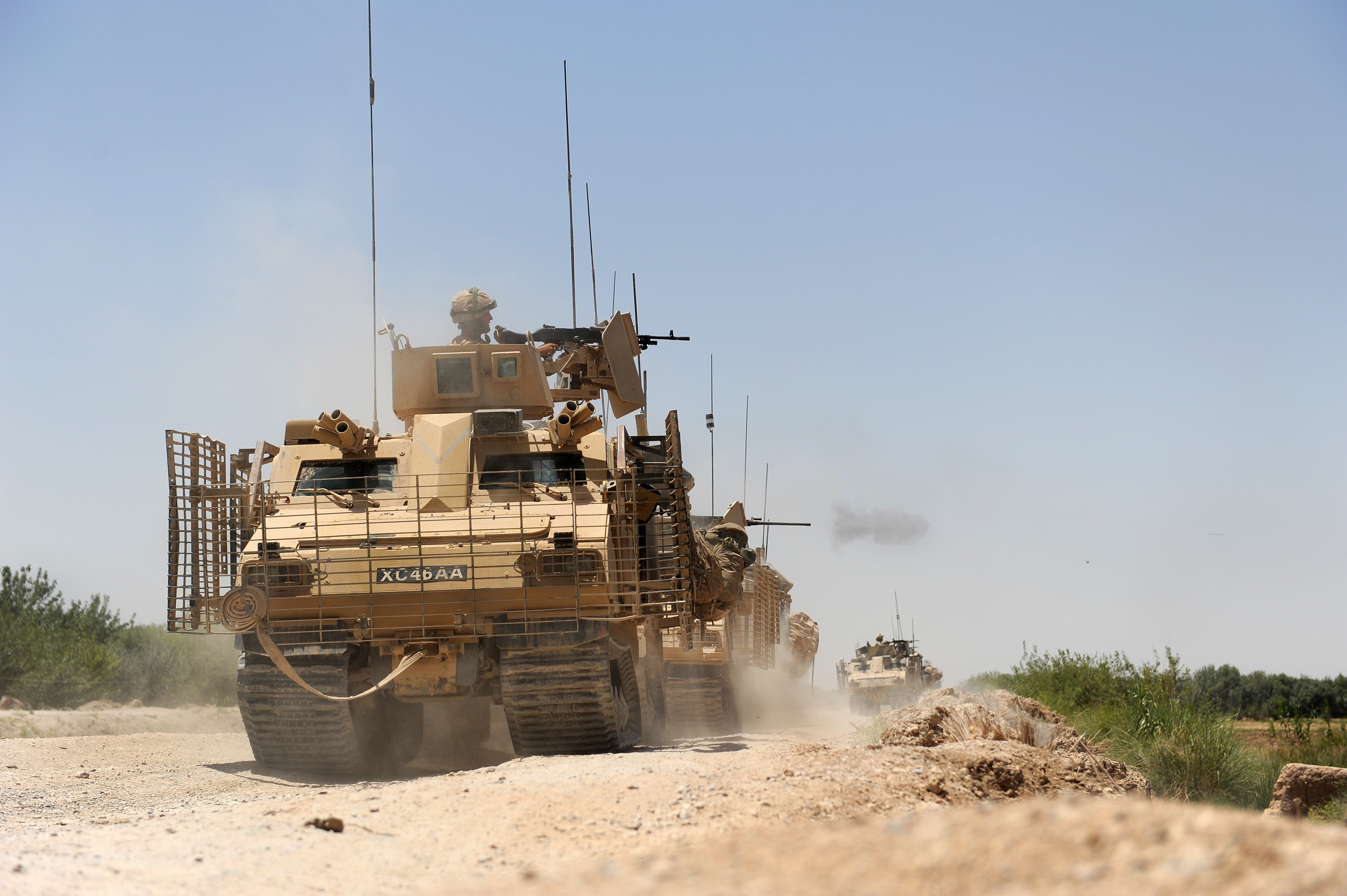
British Viking Vehicles Open Fire on Taliban Positions during Operation Panther's Claw, 28 June 2009.

On June 19, 2009, British, ISAF and ANA forces launched a large offensive named Operation Panther's Claw. Its stated aim was the securing of various canal and river crossings and establishing a lasting ISAF presence in an area described by Lt Col Richardson as "one of the main Taliban strongholds" ahead of the 2009 Afghan presidential election.

3,000 British, 650 ANA, 700 Danish and 130 Estonians were involved in the operation which has been described as "one of the largest air operations in modern times" when, after midnight on June 19, hundreds of British soldiers were transported by 12 Chinooks into Babaji (North of Lashkar Gah) and supported by 13 other aircraft including a US AC-130H Spectre Gunship. They established a firm foothold and more troops moved in to secure the area.

The offensive claimed the lives of 15 British troops within a week including 8 within 24 hours. This contributed to the bloodiest week for British forces in Afghanistan so far.

The operation was declared "a major success" by British officials. They claimed the offensive secured land for around 100,000 people and started to break the "chain of terror" linking Afghanistan and parts of Pakistan to the UK.

However the security conditions for the Afghan presidential elections in the region were almost non-existent. In the Babaji area alone only 150 people came out to vote.

=== Operation Khanjar ===
On July 2, 2009, U.S. Marines, simultaneously with the British, launched a massive offensive, dubbed Operation Khanjar, in hopes of securing the province for the Afghanistan presidential elections coming up, as well as turning the tide of the insurgency. In the months preceding the operation, 11,000 U.S. Marines had poured into the province as part of President Obama's troop surge.

Using helicopters, Marines landed behind Taliban lines into areas where coalition forces had never been before. Simultaneously, other Marine elements pushed into remote areas by vehicle convoys. The initial stages of the operation were so sudden that Taliban forces were apparently taken by surprise. Their spokesman was quoted saying that he could not believe that the US had deployed so many troops, "I consider it a part of a psychological war," but vowed the Americans would still lose.

Marine units have now begun moving into the southern reaches of the Helmand River Valley, supported by fighter aircraft.

==== Battle of Dahaneh ====
During operation Khanjar, U.S. Marines took back the town of Dahaneh from Taliban forces after it was under insurgent control for four years. During the battle 1 Marine and around 19-22 insurgents were killed, with 5 captured. It took US Marine forces three days to secure the town during which heavy street fighting occurred.

=== Operation Tor Shpa'h ===
The operation was to last four weeks and involve 450 British troops, 100 Afghan soldiers and police, and two long patrols from Afghan Task Force (ATF) 444-the Afghan special operations group for Helmand Province, mentoring and working alongside AFT 444 patrols was a company from the British SFSG. The operation began on December 18, members of the Grenadier Guards and ATF 444 advanced up from Shin Kalay in order to 'find and fix' the insurgent defence. The cautious advance revealed major weaknesses in the insurgent command and control: The Taliban commander in the area did not have the capacity to deal with the unfolding battle and was soon overstretched. Taliban logistics also appeared to be weak, as insurgents typically ran out of ammunition after a few hours; the Grenadier Guards found that the insurgents were constantly trying to get them to fire on civilians between the lines of both sides.

After ten days, ISAF launched two simultaneous night-time assaults by helicopter over insurgent front lines and directly onto Taliban strongholds. In the early hours of 28 December, a pair of RAF Chinooks inserted A Company Royal Welsh battlegroup and their ATF 444 partners directly into Noorzoy Kalay, a third Chinook dropped a British and Afghan special operations group onto the Taliban command position near Baluchan. British and Afghan ground forces then moved up to complete the clearing of Noorzoy Kalay and Baluchan, as well as lift the siege of Patrol Base (PB) Pimon; insurgents were caught in a pincer movement as B Company Royal Welsh moved in on Jackal Light Armoured Vehicles. Finally, on 29 December, a company from the Grenadier Guards, operating with ATF 444, cleared the insurgents out of Zorobad.

ISAF intelligence had estimated that the villagers in Noorzoy Kalay and Baluchan were giving reluctant support to the Taliban, and so could be persuaded to side with the government. Heavy 'messaging' had proceeded the operation to advise local elders that an overwhelming force was on its way to secure Chah-e Mazir. This message was passed on to local Taliban commanders, which had the desired effect: the insurgents retreated in advance of British and Afghan forces and put up only a sporadic resistance. Operation Tor Shpa'h was in effect the dry run for Operation Moshtarak, Task Force Helmand headquarters had deliberately played down the Tor Shpa'h in advance so as to 'avoid the impression that it would be another Panchai Palang.' The operation demonstrated that working through local elders, the Taliban could be coerced into surrendering ground without the necessity for major combat operations.

== New War Model ==
=== Operation Moshtarak ===
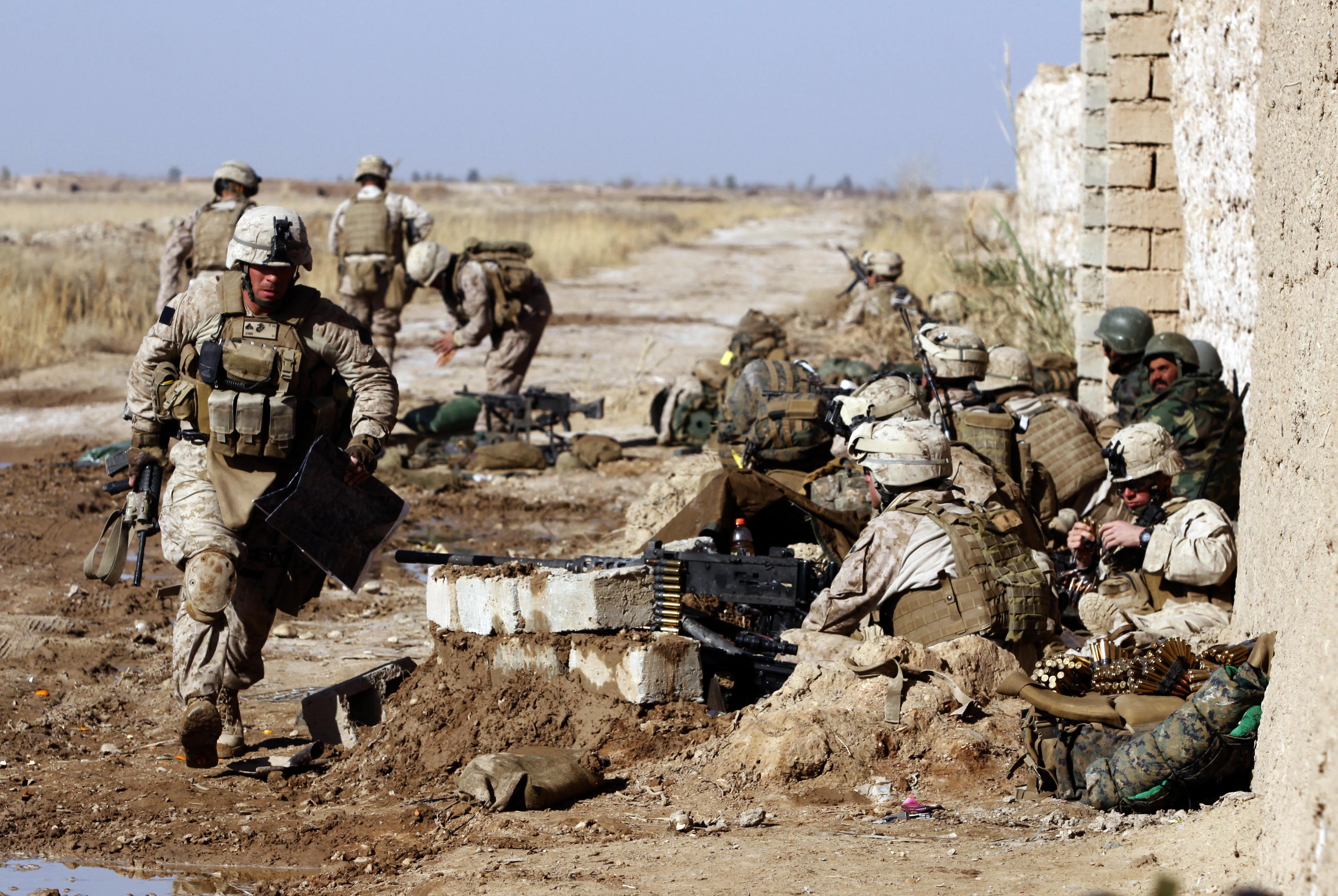
U.S. Marines securing the city of Marjah.

On February 13, 2010, Operation Moshtarak was an International Security Assistance Force (ISAF) pacification offensive in the town of Marjah, Helmand Province, Afghanistan. It involved 15,000 American, Afghan, and British troops and constituted the largest joint operation of the War in Afghanistan up to that point and aimed to remove the Taliban from Marjah and eliminate the last Taliban stronghold in central Helmand Province.

The main target of the offensive was the town of Marjah, which had been controlled for years by the Taliban as well as drug traffickers. Although Moshtarak was described as the largest in Afghanistan since the fall of the Taliban, it was originally supposed to be the prelude to a much larger offensive in Kandahar that would follow Moshtarak by several months. However ISAF chose to heavily publicize the operation before it was launched, comparing its scope and size to the 2004 Second Battle of Fallujah, in the hopes that Taliban fighters in the town would flee. The operation was also designed to showcase improvements in both the Afghan government and Afghan security forces. ISAF claimed that the operation was "Afghan-led" would use five Afghan brigades. General Stanley A. McChrystal, the commander of ISAF, also promised that following the offensive ISAF would install a "government in a box" in Marjah.

Although initially successfully, ISAF and the Afghans failed to set up a working government in the town, leading to a successful resurgence by the Taliban; 90 days into the offensive General McChrystal famously referred to it as a "bleeding ulcer". In October the town was still described as "troubling", but by early December the fighting there was declared "essentially over".

The operation was called "a key test" of the coalition strategy against the Taliban insurgency. Brigadier James Cowan, the commander of British forces in Helmand, believed it would mark "the start of the end of this insurgency". At the very least it would become a test of whether the Afghan forces would be able to make their country peaceful and safe.

The announcement of the operation was also a part of this strategy: "shaping the information battlefield strategic communications", and to ensure it would not repeat the destruction of Fallujah in Iraq in 2004. Hours before the offensive began, Afghan and coalition forces dropped leaflets with the message, "Do not allow the Taliban to enter your home". After this operation in Helmand province, the neighbouring province and the city of Kandahar became a target of American operations. In March 2010, U.S. and NATO commanders released details of plans for the biggest offensive of the war against the Taliban insurgency.

When launched, the operation was called a "new war model". Afghan and NATO officials had assembled a large team of Afghan administrators and an Afghan governor that would move into Marjah after the fighting, with more than 1,900 police standing by. "We've got a government in a box, ready to roll in", said American commander Stanley McChrystal. The capture of Marjah was intended to serve as a prototype for a new type of military operation. The Afghan government had pledged to hold any territory seized in the Taliban heartland during the assault. Utilities engineers were on hand to ensure power and water supplies were maintained.

=== Operation Tor Shezada ===
The operation took place from July 2010 south of Nad-e Ali in Helmand Province against the Taliban. The operation was planned and executed by the International Security Assistance Force element from Task Force Helmand, and the Afghan Army, whose mission was to clear insurgents from Seyyedabad, in parallel to similar operations by the U.S. Marine Corps in Northern Marjah. Enabled by the UK Joint Aviation Group - controlled in the air by UK Apache Attack Helicopters from 664 Squadron AAC working alongside UK Chinook and Merlin heavy lift aircraft and USMC CH-53s, Osprey V-22s, Cobra Attack Helicopters and numerous other rotary wing and international Fixed Wing air assets.

== Incidents ==
=== Helmand province incident ===
During the campaign there were numerous incidents where NATO air strikes resulted in massive casualties for the civilian population. One of the more notable was on June 22, 2007. A NATO air strike killed between 45 and 100 civilians. The Afghan and Pakistan governments condemned the attack blaming both NATO and the Taliban. NATO's reaction to the incident was just that the number of dead was less than 45 and they welcomed an investigation. But they stated that they will not change their tactic of bombing civilian centers because the Taliban use civilians as human shields. By then up to 314 civilians were killed by Coalition troops in contrast to 279 by insurgents.

=== Friendly fire ===
On August 23, 2007, three British soldiers from the Royal Anglian Regiment were killed, and two injured, by a U.S. F-15 fighter.

On September 26, 2007, two Danish soldiers were killed by a British missile in a "friendly fire" incident. The British Ministry of Defence appointed a board of inquiry to investigate the affair.

== Political developments ==
Before the arrival of ISAF troops, Helmand province was ruled by governor Sher Mohammed Akhundzada. Due to his participation in opium-dealing and alleged links with the Taliban, the British demanded that he be replaced. In January 2006, President Karzai agreed to remove him, but the two men maintained cordial relations, and Akhundzada was appointed as a member of the National Assembly of Afghanistan. His replacement, Mohammad Daoud, a British protégé, was obliged to accept Amir Muhammad Akhundzada, the brother of Sher Mohammed, as his deputy, in order to pacify the Akhundzada family and their important tribal following. Amir Muhammad did not collaborate with Daoud, and constantly undermined his rule, eventually driving him from power in December 2006. Daoud's removal was also attributed to the Americans and to the hawks in the Karzai government, due to their rejection of the Musa Qala accord, that was seen as a "strategic disaster". In 2009, Sher Mohammed revealed that after his removal from power, he had encouraged some 3,000 of his fighters to join the Taliban, as he was no longer able to pay them.

Daoud's successor was Assadullah Wafa, an elderly man with poor health, who had had little authority in Helmand. In November 2007, Sher Mohammed was said to be vying to return to power in Helmand, taking advantage of rumours of defections of an important tribe to the government, and it was known that he had raised a 500-strong tribal militia to further his political ambitions. In March 2008 Assadullah Wafa was replaced by Gulab Mangal.

Fresh tensions became apparent, after Afghan officials revealed that a Taliban commander killed in 2007 by British SAS and SBS forces near Sangin had in fact proved to be a Pakistani military officer. The British refused to publicize this evidence of Pakistani support to the insurgents, which further angered the Afghan government.

In September 2008, Hamid Karzai proposed to restore Sher Mohammed Akhundzada as the governor of Helmand province, believing that his tribal militia could help contain the Taliban. However, the British did not agree with this choice, in view of Akhundzada's alleged policy of encouraging Taliban attacks, and the risk that his return could spark new fighting between rival drug gangs. Prime minister Gordon Brown threatened to withdraw British troops if Akhundzada was reinstated. Karzai responded by blaming the increased Taliban activity and opium production on British "interference".

== See also ==
- Coalition combat operations in Afghanistan in 2008
- Operation Herrick
- Operation Herrick order of battle
- Opium production in Afghanistan
- Operation Khanjar
- Strategy for Operation Herrick
- USS Helmand Province

== Bibliography ==
- Bishop, Patrick (2007). Three Para. HarperPress. ISBN 978-0-00-725778-2.
- Farrell, Theo (7 September 2017). Unwinnable: Britain's War in Afghanistan. Random House. ISBN 978-1-4735-2240-4.
- Malkasian, Carter (2021). The American War in Afghanistan: A History. Oxford University Press. ISBN 978-0-19-755077-9.
