= James Cowan (British Army officer) =

British Army officer

Major General James Cowan CBE DSO
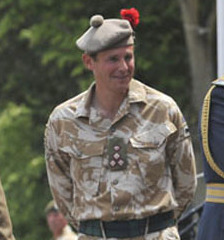
- Brigadier Cowan in 2010
- Born: 1 April 1964 (age 62)
- Military career
- Allegiance: United Kingdom
- Branch: British Army
- Service years: 1982–2015
- Rank: Major General
- Commands: 3rd (UK) Division; 11th Light Brigade; Black Watch
- Conflicts: The Troubles; Iraq War; War in Afghanistan
- Awards: Commander of the Order of the British Empire; Distinguished Service Order; Mentioned in Despatches

Major General James Michael Cowan, CBE, DSO (born 1 April 1964) is a former British Army officer. He is now CEO of The HALO Trust, a humanitarian organisation which works in post-conflict zones, and a trustee of Waterloo Uncovered, a charity conducting archaeology at the site of the Battle of Waterloo with veterans and serving personnel.

== Early life and education ==
Educated at Wellington College, Cowan joined the Ulster Defence Regiment as a private soldier in 1982 during The Troubles. He then studied Modern History at Pembroke College, Oxford and was commissioned into the Black Watch in 1983.

== Career ==
=== Military ===
He served first in Berlin and from 1989 until 1991 he served in Northern Ireland, where he was Mentioned in Despatches. He became commanding officer of 1st Battalion The Black Watch (Royal Highland Regiment) in July 2003 and in that role was deployed to Iraq for Operation Telic in Summer 2004. Towards the end of the tour, Cowan led his Battalion during Operation BRACKEN, seeing action during the Second Battle of Fallujah, for which he was appointed an Officer of the Order of the British Empire. He became Chief of Staff for 3rd (UK) Division and was deployed to Iraq as Chief of Staff for Multi-National Division (South East) from July 2006 until January 2007.

He became Commander of 11th Light Brigade in October 2007 and in that role he led Task Force Helmand during the Helmand province campaign in 2009–10 which he described as his most demanding tour. He had hoped that Operation Moshtarak would mark "the start of the end of this insurgency". At the very least it would become a test of whether the Afghan forces would be able to make their country peaceful and safe. He was awarded the Distinguished Service Order at the end of his tour of command.

Cowan went on to be head of Counter Terrorism & UK Operations in the Operations Directorate at the Ministry of Defence in 2010 with responsibility for the military contribution to the London 2012 Olympics. On promotion to major general he became General Officer Commanding 3rd (UK) Division in April 2013.

Cowan became a Commander of the Order of the British Empire in the 2013 Birthday Honours. The following year, he faced ridicule for berating young officers for eating sandwiches in the Army mess. In a leaked memo addressed to "Chaps", he stated: "Quite a few officers in the divisional mess seem to be under the impression that they can eat their food with their hands. The practice of serving rolls and sandwiches in the mess is to stop. A gentleman or lady always uses a knife and fork. And while on the subject of knives and forks I see a great many frankly barbaric techniques on display." He also expressed his dissatisfaction with standards of etiquette and grammar. "Combined with underlining and italics, the wanton use of capitals, abbreviations and acronyms assaults the eye and leaves the reader exhausted." he wrote. The key to matrimonial success, he said, was for an officer never to sit next to his wife at dinner "except when dining alone at home" because doing so showed insecurity. He added that "thank-you letters are an art form not a chore" and that these should usually be written by an officer's wife. Cowan's retirement was announced shortly after widespread publicity over the memo.

He marked his departure from the Army with a speech to the General Assembly of the Church of Scotland on 21 May 2015, in which he drew on his own experience and on history to describe the nature of war.

=== Head of landmine clearance charity ===
Cowan retired from the Army in 2015, and his appointment as chief executive of the international landmine clearance charity the HALO Trust, with effect from April 2015, was announced in late February 2015. When the government of Mozambique declared the country free of all known landmines, Cowan commented that "Mozambique is a compelling example of how dealing with the deadly debris of war systematically and in partnership with government, local people and donors can bring stability, recovery and growth to countries ravaged by war." Interviewed about the clearance of the Baptism Site on the western bank of the River Jordan, Cowan described it as a project with "tremendous symbolism".

=== Other charity work ===
Since 2017 Cowan has served as a trustee of the veteran support charity Waterloo Uncovered. In October 2021 Waterloo Uncovered hosted an exhibition in the National Army Museum entitled Waterloo Remodelled, featuring sections of a large diorama of the Battle of Waterloo in 20mm scale created by Cowan. Proceeds from tickets sales were donated to Waterloo Uncovered.

Military offices
Preceded by John Lorimer	General Officer Commanding the 3rd (UK) Mechanised Division; 2013–2015	Succeeded by Patrick Sanders
