= Jerry Thomas (Royal Marines officer) =

British general

Major General Jerry Thomas CB
- Military career
- Allegiance: United Kingdom
- Branch: Royal Marines
- Service years: 1975–2013
- Rank: Major General
- Commands: 3 Commando Brigade; 42 Commando
- Conflicts: Operation Palliser; War in Afghanistan
- Awards: Companion of the Order of the Bath

Major General Jerry Thomas, CB is a former Royal Marines officer who served as Assistant Chief of the Defence Staff (Intelligence Capability).

== Military career ==
Thomas joined the Royal Marines in September 1975. After serving as chief of staff for 3 Commando Brigade, he became commander of 45 Commando in September 1997 in which capacity he was deployed carrying out humanitarian work in the wake of Hurricane Mitch and then became chief UK advisor to the Sierra Leone Armed Forces during Operation Palliser in 2000.

Thomas went on to be Assistant Commander Operations at Fleet Headquarters in January 2002, in which capacity he coordinated 3 Commando Brigade's deployment on Operation Jacana during the War in Afghanistan. After that he became Director of Operations for Defence Intelligence in March 2003 and commander of 3 Commando Brigade, which was deployed to Afghanistan as Task Force Helmand in October 2006. He then became Senior British Military Advisor at United States Central Command in April 2007 and Assistant Chief of the Defence Staff (Intelligence Capability) in March 2009 before retiring from the Royal Marines in May 2013.
