= Musa Qala =

Musa Qala موسی کلا
- Town
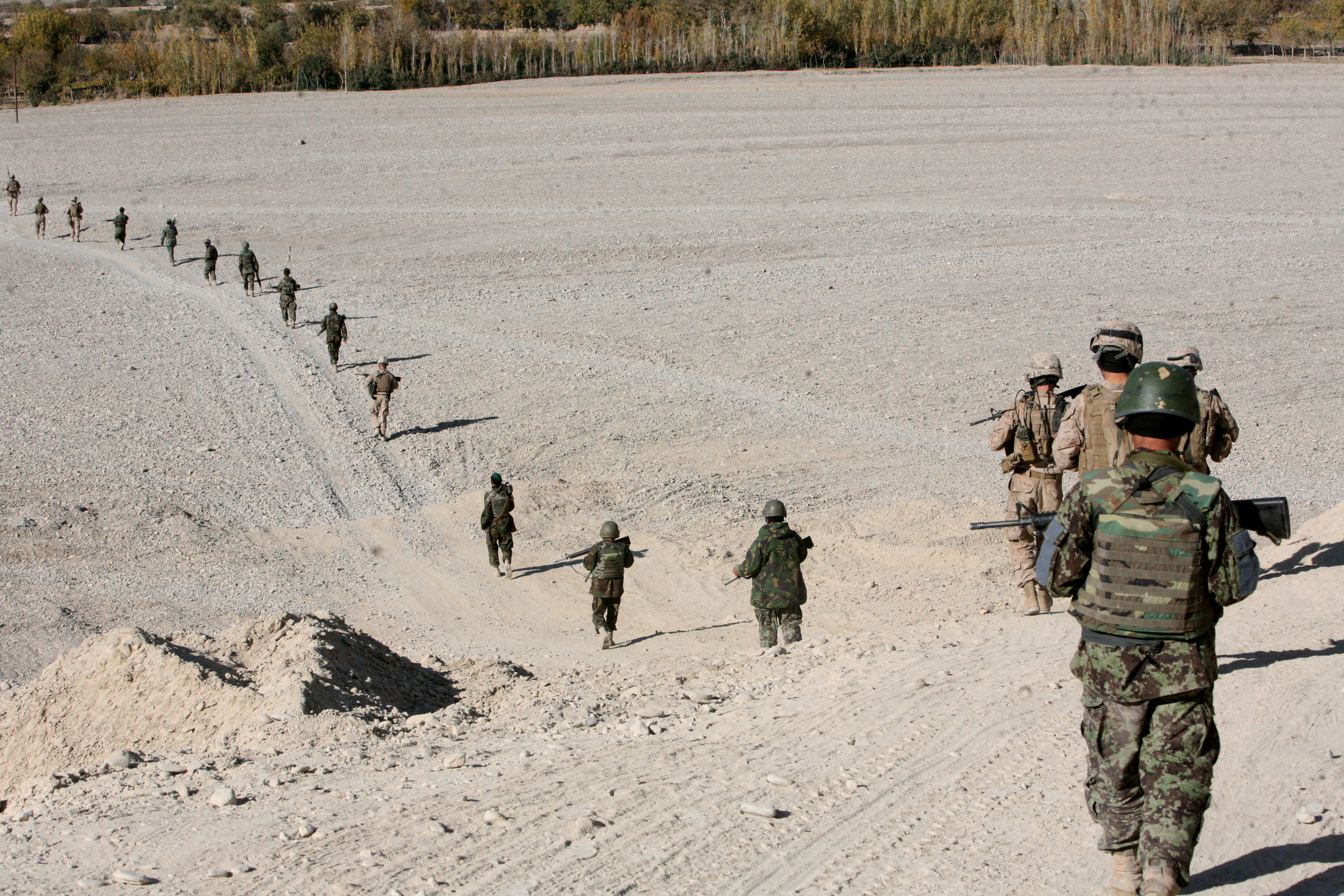
- Afghan National Army (ANA) patrolling alongside U.S. Marines in Musa Qala (2010)

- Location in Afghanistan
- Coordinates: 32°27′51″N 64°44′48″E
- Country: Afghanistan
- Province: Helmand Province
- District: Musa Qala District
- Elevation: 1,043 m (3,422 ft)
- Time zone: UTC+4:30 (Afghanistan Standard Time)

Musa Qala (Pashto: موسی کلا; lit. 'Fortress of Moses') is a town and the district centre of Musa Qala District in Helmand Province, Afghanistan. It is located at 32.4433°N 64.7444°E and at an altitude of 1,043 m in the valley of Musa Qala River in the central western part of the district. Its population has been reported in the British press to be both 2,000 and 20,000. It is in a desolate area, populated by native Pashtun tribes.

== Climate ==
With virtually no rainfall during the year, Musa Qala features a cold desert climate (BWk) under the Köppen climate classification. The average temperature in Musa Qala is 17.6 °C, while the annual precipitation averages 159 mm.

July is the warmest month of the year with an average temperature of 30.3 °C. The coldest month January has an average temperature of 4.7 °C.

Climate data for Musa Qala
Month	Jan	Feb	Mar	Apr	May	Jun	Jul	Aug	Sep	Oct	Nov	Dec	Year
Mean daily maximum °C (°F)	11.3 (52.3)	13.5 (56.3)	20.3 (68.5)	26.7 (80.1)	32.7 (90.9)	38.3 (100.9)	39.6 (103.3)	38.1 (100.6)	33.5 (92.3)	27.3 (81.1)	19.6 (67.3)	13.8 (56.8)	26.2 (79.2)
Daily mean °C (°F)	4.7 (40.5)	7.0 (44.6)	13.0 (55.4)	18.6 (65.5)	23.7 (74.7)	28.4 (83.1)	30.3 (86.5)	28.2 (82.8)	23.0 (73.4)	17.1 (62.8)	10.6 (51.1)	6.2 (43.2)	17.6 (63.6)
Mean daily minimum °C (°F)	−1.8 (28.8)	0.5 (32.9)	5.8 (42.4)	10.8 (51.4)	14.8 (58.6)	18.6 (65.5)	21.0 (69.8)	18.4 (65.1)	12.5 (54.5)	7.0 (44.6)	1.6 (34.9)	−1.3 (29.7)	9.0 (48.2)
Source: Climate-Data.org

== Taliban resurgence ==
In February 2006 intensive fighting erupted there, leading to 28 deaths, including the Musa Qala district chief, Abdul Quddus. On March 3, 2006, the Sangin district governor, Amir Jan, was killed in Musa Qala while on vacation. British forces were deployed to defend the district offices at Musa Qala (and also at Sangin, Nawzad and Kajaki). Over several months, eight British soldiers died there during attacks by the Taliban. 23–25 July 2006, Danish troops of the "1. Lette Opklaringseskadron" (1st Light Reconnaissance Squadron, 120 men) moved in to replace the British troops, but found themselves having to assist the British troops repel a major Taliban attack before they could carry out the replacement. On 28 August 2006, the Danish forces were replaced as planned, if slightly belated, and were once again replaced by the British.

=== Truce with the Taliban ===
In late September 2006, a secret truce was allegedly made with the Taliban under which British troops would quietly move out of Musa Qala in return for the Taliban not attacking the region. The truce had the sanction of Mohammad Daud, the governor of Helmand province, and most tribal elders, who felt they could now exercise control over the Taliban themselves. It was also seen as a move to help integrate the local Pashtun tribes on the side of the US-allied government. Others however, saw the move as a cop-out; Lieutenant-General David Richards, the NATO commander in Afghanistan at the time, said that this move turned these four centers into "magnets" for the Taliban insurgents.

Initially, the local leaders were happy with the settlement, which gave them the upper hand over the Taliban. In the long run, however, attempts to win over the population appear to have failed, especially under the NATO strategy of air bombing which killed more than 4,600 Afghan noncombatants from 2001 to 2006, according to a study from University of New Hampshire. The result has been the steady growth of anti-American sentiment in the region, focused on the US-backed regime of President Hamid Karzai. Karzai himself deplored the attacks, apparently breaking down in tears, saying that "the cruelty is too much. [The coalition forces] are killing our children."

=== Recapture by the Taliban ===
In February 2007, a Taliban force of about 100 or possibly 200 strong under Mullah Abdul Ghafoor captured the town, overran the district centre and raised their trademark white flag. All tribal leaders who had arranged the truce with the British forces were jailed. Some sources report the Taliban force numbered "several hundred".

The situation created a crisis for the ISAF forces in Afghanistan, on the same day that the British commanding officer General David Richards handed over charge of the ISAF team to an American, General Dan K. McNeill; MacNeil suggested that "surgical and deliberate" force would be used to evict the fighters from Musa Qala. On 4 February US forces claimed that an air strike near Musa Qala had killed a senior Taliban leader, possibly Mullah Abdul Ghafoor, while travelling in a truck.

McNeill, the new ISAF commander, felt that "come spring, an ISAF offensive not a Taliban offensive will set the conditions to defeat the insurgents again."

Eurasianet reports: "The attack laid waste to an agreement there, brokered last fall by Richards and local tribal elders, under which NATO troops agreed to withdraw from the town in return for a commitment by local Afghan leaders to oppose the Taliban."

Eurasianet reports that Richards, the outgoing ISAF commander, is an expert at negotiation. It reports that McNeill, the new ISAF commander, opposes the kind of local agreements that Richards favored, and speculated that the aerial bombardment that was reported to have killed Mullah Abdul Ghafour was a sign of McNeill's more aggressive, less conciliatory approach.

"Officials in several European countries have quietly expressed concern about placing an American general in charge of the NATO force. Richards tried to create a less harsh, more economic-development-oriented identity for NATO in Afghanistan, as compared to the "kicking-down-doors" image that US forces have. Many local analysts expect NATO forces to embrace a more aggressive stance under McNeill, who is believed to oppose the type of local peace arrangements that Richards promoted. The danger at this point is that an overly aggressive NATO force in Afghanistan could alienate Afghans, and thus cause the Taliban’s support base to grow."

The district was the scene of heavy fighting in late July 2007 after ISAF forces attacked several rebel hideouts in Helmand Province. Coalition officials said that up to 160 Taliban fighters were killed between 22 July and 26 July in gun battles and air strikes, adding that, rather than avoiding battle, the Taliban were trying to defend the area. No civilian casualties were reported by ISAF, although a self-described resident claimed by phone that 16 civilians were killed in an air strike.

In October 2007, Reuters reported that ISAF troops and Afghan National Security Forces (ANSF) had killed 80 Taliban insurgents in a six-hour battle there. As with the July engagement, the Taliban concentrated their forces and fought to defend the region rather than using typical "shoot and scoot" tactics.

== Battle of Musa Qala ==
As of 7 December 2007, an alleged 2,000 Taliban rebels occupied Musa Qala. British led ISAF and Afghan forces prepared for a siege of the town. Operation Mar Karadad commenced with an overnight attack by the air assets of the 82nd Airborne Task Force Corsair, a Combat Aviation Brigade (CAB). Afghan troops and paratroopers from 1st Battalion 508th Parachute Infantry Regiment fought for control of the village, which was a major Taliban drug trafficking station and the Taliban's only occupied village in the strategically crucial Helmand province. There has been some civilian evacuation, partly aided by the aerial dropping of leaflets warning of the impending battle. In preparation, it is believed that the village was heavily mined by Taliban fighters. Sergeant Lee Johnson of the 2nd Bn The Yorkshire Regiment was killed shortly after 10am on 8 December 2007, whilst taking part in an operation to recapture the town, when a land mine exploded. The following day, Cpl. Tanner J. O'Leary of the 1st Battalion 508th Infantry Regiment (United States) was also killed by an explosive device. The Taliban insurgents withdrew from the area by midday on 10 December leaving the ANSF and NATO forces in control of the town.

== U.S. Marines in Musa Qala ==
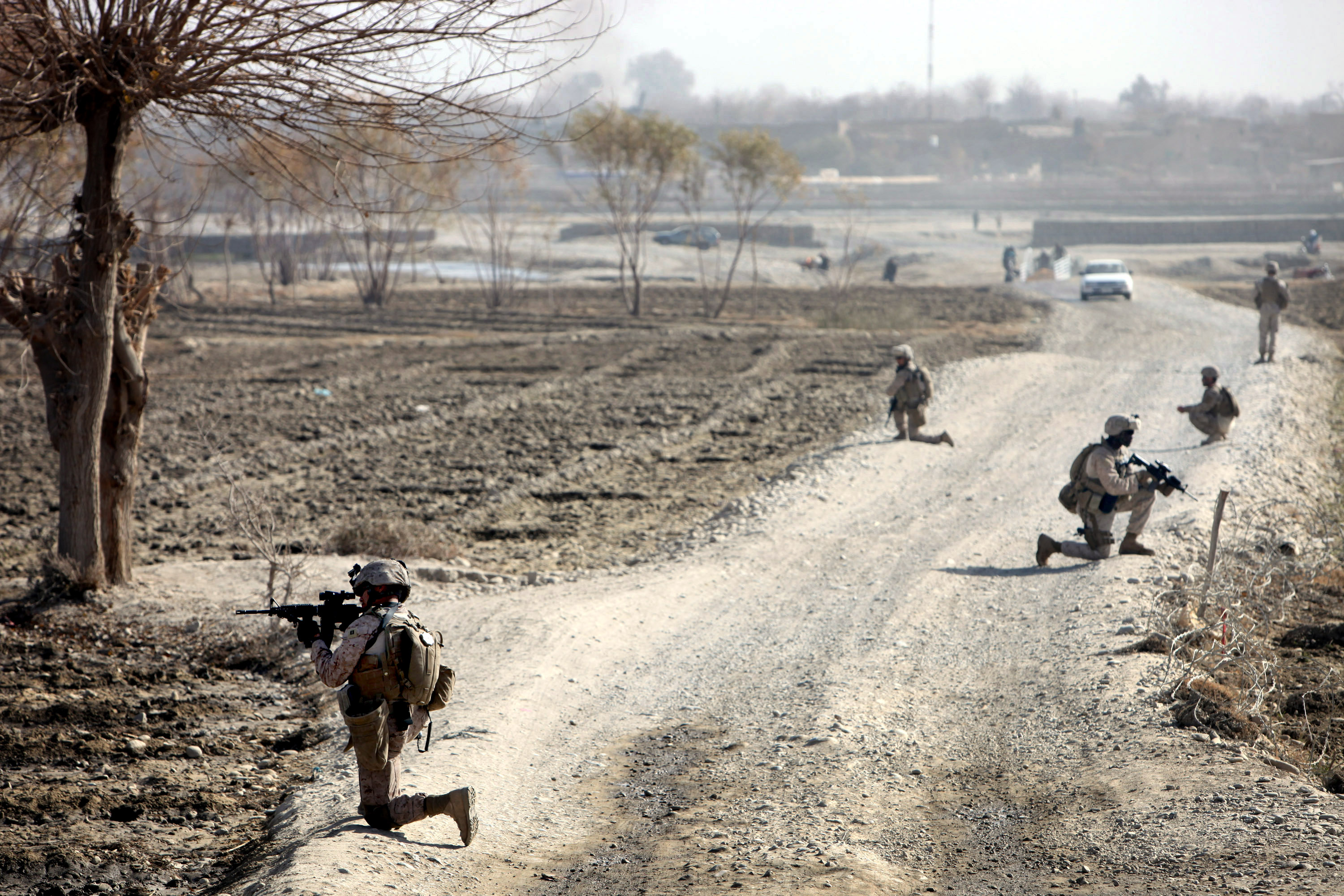
U.S. Marines assigned to the 1st Battalion, 8th Marines, pulling security during a patrol in Musa Qala (2010).

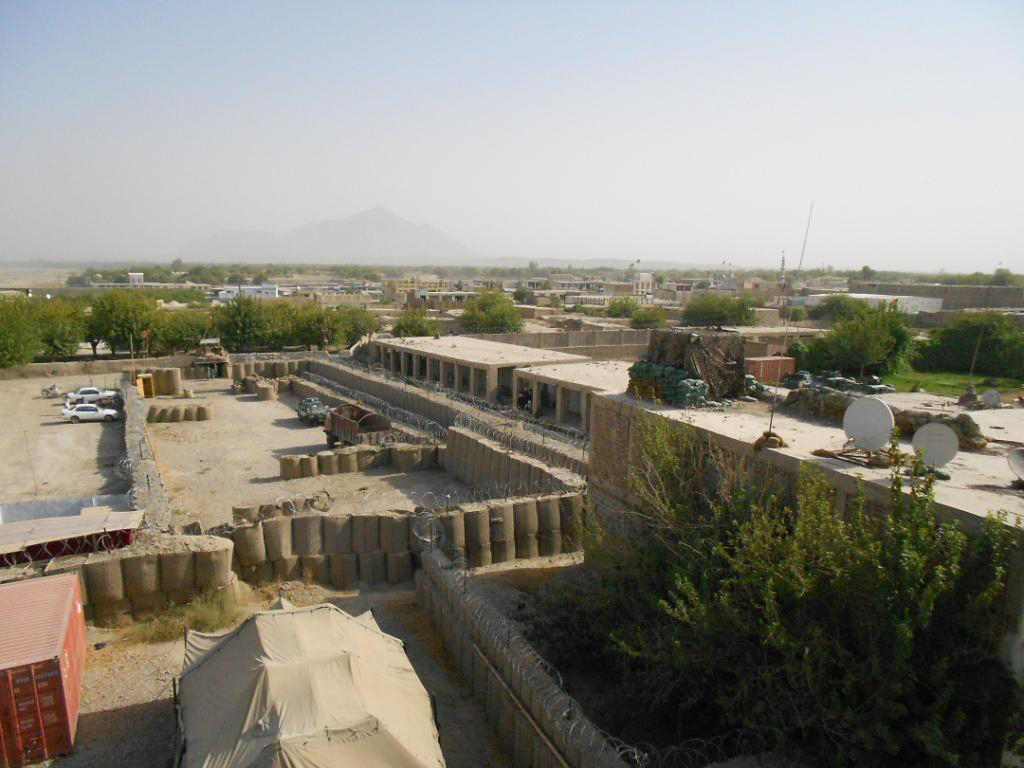
The town of Musa Qala in Afghanistan

In April 2008 2nd Battalion 7th Marines deployed throughout the Farah and Helmand Provinces. Their mission was to assist in seizing the town and to help ISAF forces train the Afghan National Police. They met heavy opposition and had several very intense firefights within days of arriving and throughout the coming months, but were aggressive and quick in their tactics resulting them pushing the offensive further and further out of the town.

In mid-2008 the Afghan police had completed their training, were strategically placed throughout the town and its entrances, and mentored with constant supervision and even conducted security patrols and combat operations alongside ISAF forces. After months of training and fighting with many firefights sometimes exceeding 6 hours, the town of Musa Qala was significantly quieter and more peaceful than it had been prior to the U.S Marines arrival.

In August 2008 a detachment of Marines left Musa Qala to assist in the taking over of Taliban headquarters in the Helmand province in a nearby town called Nawzad. The town was used by the Taliban as a safe haven while they were not in Musa Qala and had been completely abandoned by all Afghan civilians due to Taliban presence. In Nawzad the Marines successfully drove the three to four hundred Taliban out with heavy airstrikes and ground forces in just over 14 hours. The Marines did not have the resources to hold the Taliban headquarters and had to return to base, which resulted in the Taliban returning several days later.

== Additional notes ==
In memory of a prior conflict, in 2006, involving the British Royal Irish Regiment, a new Regimental March, composed by Chris Attrill and commissioned by Larne Borough Council, was given to the regiment on Saturday 1 November 2008 in Larne, County Antrim, Northern Ireland during an event in which the regiment was presented with the 'Freedom of the Borough'. This gave the regiment the right to march through the town with 'flags flying, bands playing and bayonets fixed'. The March was named, 'Musa Qala'.

== See also ==
- Helmand Province
