= Task Force Helmand =

- Active: April 2006-1 April 2014
- Countries: United Kingdom; Bosnia and Herzegovina; Denmark; Estonia; Jordan; Tonga
- Role: Combat forces
- Part of: Regional Command Southwest
- Garrison/HQ: Kandahar Airfield (April – November 2006); MOB Lashkar Gah (November 2006 – August 2013); Camp Bastion (August 2013 – April 2014)
- Engagements: War in Afghanistan * Helmand province campaign

Task Force Helmand was the name given to a military unit of the International Security Assistance Force in Helmand Province, Afghanistan. Task Force Helmand was part of Regional Command Southwest and consisted primarily of personnel from the British Armed Forces, as well as contribution from NATO allies Denmark and Estonia. It was established in April 2006, which coincided with the deployment of Operation Herrick 4.

During August 2013 the Headquarters of Task Force Helmand moved from MOB Lashkar Gah to Camp Bastion.

On 1 April 2014 the command was disbanded and its responsibilities were turned over to Regional Command Southwest.

== Commanders ==
- Brigadier Ed Butler (April 2006 – October 2006)
- Brigadier Jerry Thomas (October 2006 – April 2007)
- Brigadier John Lorimer (April 2007 – October 2007)
- Brigadier Andrew MacKay (October 2007 – April 2008)
- Brigadier Mark Carleton-Smith (April 2008 – October 2008)
- Brigadier Gordon Messenger (October 2008 – April 2009)
- Brigadier Tim Radford (April 2009 – October 2010)
- Brigadier James Cowan (October 2009 – April 2010)
- Brigadier Richard Felton (April 2010 – October 2010)
- Brigadier James Chiswell (October 2010 – April 2011)
- Brigadier Ed Davis (April 2011 – October 2011)
- Brigadier Patrick Sanders (October 2011 – April 2012)
- Brigadier Douglas Chalmers (April 2012 – October 2012)
- Brigadier Bob Bruce (October 2012 – April 2013)
- Brigadier Rupert Jones (April 2013 – October 2013)
- Brigadier James Woodham (October 2013 – April 2014)

== See also ==
- Operation Herrick order of battle
