= Strategy for Operation Herrick =

Operation Herrick is the codename for the British part of the NATO International Security Assistance Force (ISAF) campaign in Afghanistan.

It is the UK Governments position that the UK cannot disengage from Afghanistan and retains an active military presence (particularly Helmand province) because of the continued terrorist threat facing Britain and the world. Building a strong Afghan state is a long and difficult task. The Liberal-Conservative coalition government (May 2010 - May 2015) declared that Afghanistan was the UK's top foreign policy priority.

== Strategic Threat ==
In 2001 the Taliban regime in Afghanistan enabled Al-Qaeda to plot terror around the world and this led to tragic consequences of 9/11. As the Taliban were removed from power and Al-Qaeda, including their training camps, was driven from Afghanistan by Coalition forces, Al-Qaeda has relocated to the remote mountains of Pakistan's northwest frontier province and Federally Administered Tribal Areas (FATA).

The main threat continues to originate from Al-Qaeda and the Pakistan part of the Afghanistan-Pakistan border region. Al-Qaeda retains some contacts and provides limited support to the Afghan-Pakistan insurgency, principally through the provision of training for foreign fighters and military expertise; continues to view Afghanistan as fundamental in the establishment of a pan-Islamic caliphate; and therefore a peaceful and stable Afghanistan would be a severe propaganda blow and strategic failure for Al-Qaeda.

If the Taliban are allowed to undermine legitimate government in either Afghanistan or Pakistan, that would enable Al-Qaeda and other terrorist groups to have greater freedom and a sanctuary from which to train, plan and launch terrorist attacks across the world - and would have longer term implications for the credibility of NATO and the international community - and for the stability of both this crucial region and globally.

The UK's position, both under the Labour Government (April 2009 - May 2010) and the Liberal-Conservative coalition government (May 2010 - May 2015), is that the prevention of terrorism on the streets of the UK, America and other countries depends on providing stability in the region spanning the Afghanistan-Pakistan border through strengthening the authorities in both Pakistan and Afghanistan to defeat Al-Qaeda, and also the Pakistan and Afghan Taliban.

In July 2009 the Director-General of the UK Security Service estimated that three quarters of the most serious plots against the UK have links into this region. As of June 2010, the Prime Minister stated that the threat to the UK from Al-Qaeda from Afghanistan and Pakistan has reduced, primarily due to the current strategy, although this was assessed as not yet irreversible. As of May 2011 it was the UK's position that there was still a threat that Al-Qaeda could reestablish itself within the region and therefore a continued military presence was still needed.

== The Strategic End State ==
The UK, under both the Labour (April 2009 - May 2010) and Liberal Democrat-Conservative coalition (May 2010 - May 2015) Governments, considered the end-state to be the long term denial of both Afghanistan and Pakistan as a base for Al-Qaeda under Taliban authority.

== Tactical Threat ==
In 2006, the UK deployed (approx) 3000 troops in Helmand province, Southern Afghanistan. During 2006-2009 the UK forces were stretched and ISAF did not possess sufficient manpower to clear, hold and thereby extend security and governance to the wider Regional Command South. Further, other NATO members were unable to provide additional forces and Afghan Security Forces were in their infancy. The US surge of additional troops, equipment and resources of 2009/10 into Southern Afghanistan, increased the ISAF presence within Helmand to 20,000 US Marines, with approx 8,000 UK forces. Hence, up until the US surge, its focus on more highly populated and urbanised areas in Helmand province. The surge and continued growth of the Afghan Security Forces have enabled a rebalancing of the ISAF presence in the main populated areas in Helmand. This has facilitated the concentration of UK forces within a smaller geographic area, therefore since August 2010 it is the UK's position that it has the number of troops and the right level of equipment to fulfil the strategy.

During 2006-2009 the Taliban did not possess the means to defeat ISAF through conventional means, and ISAF did not possess sufficient soldiers per population for an effective counter-insurgency strategy this enabled a stalemate situation in which the Taliban, to a greater extent than ISAF, through operating as a guerrilla force, has tactical freedom of manoeuvre and safe-havens from which to operate in central Helmand.

The Taliban having failed in 2006 and 2007 to defeat international forces by conventional means, have more than doubled their Improvised explosive device (IED) attacks over the past year and this remains the greatest challenge. International casualties for September 2009 were almost double September 2008, and three quarters of these were due to IEDs. Helmand is where the insurgency is concentrating its efforts, with over a third of the violence in the whole of Afghanistan (figures as of July 2009).

The stalemate situation resulted in Southern Afghanistan in July 2009 being largely ungoverned by legitimate elected authority, it was instead governed by a shadow Taliban government. In July 2009 the Afghan army and police could not yet maintain control of Afghanistan without direct assistance from ISAF. Whilst the 1,600 mile (2,600 km) Afghan-Pakistan border (the Durand line) is porous in many places and allows the free flow of militants.

By June 2010 the Afghan Police were assessed to be ineffective or barely able to operate in 6 of the 13 key provinces in General McChrystal's plan. By February 2011, Afghan Government control has increased from six districts to 12 out of a total of 14 within Helmand; this progress was attributed to the troop surge and increased Afghan security forces.

== The UK's Approach ==
The UK's approach, under both the Labour (April 2009 - May 2010) and Liberal-Conservative coalition (May 2010 - Current) governments, is based on the tenets of the Comprehensive approach (or Interagency approach in US parlance), whereby success will require a combination of military, economic and political solutions pursued together. It is part of a wider coordinated and integrated military-civilian counter-insurgency strategy with its international coalition allies and Afghan authorities. It involves global co-operation as well as joint and complementary action on both sides of the border region separating Afghanistan and Pakistan. The UK's position under the Labour government (April 2009 - May 2010) was to continually adapt and improve its strategy for Central Helmand to achieve the end state and did not seek to prematurely disengage from the region.

It is the UK's position that long-term stability depends on the Government of Afghanistan being able to sustain its own security, offer representative government at all levels, improve economic prospects for its people, and play a constructive role in the region. The tactics utilised by ISAF and the Afghan security forces to gradually extend security and stability are:

- Clear. Removing insurgents from an area;
- Hold. Providing sustained security through sufficient forces and resources per population;
- Build. Building both Afghan governance and development, delivered in an integrated manner.

The UK's stated objectives from April 2009 - May 2010 have developed under the Liberal-Conservative coalition government (May 2010 - Current), the following reflect the position:

=== Afghan Security ===
End State Objective: A secure Afghanistan in which the Afghan Government and civilian population are protected from sources of instability and violence.

Transition of lead responsibility of security. In the near term the UK seeks to provide the underpinning stability and security to create space for the development of the Afghan authorities to a point where they are able to provide, on a sustainable basis, the capability and governance to manage their own security in order to support the political settlement in ending the insurgency and continue to prevent the use of Afghanistan as a base from which terrorists can plot and launch attacks. Unlike the previous Labour Government, that did not state a definitive time schedule for achieving objectives within their overall strategy, the current coalition government (May 2010-current) have declared that the UK will begin to transfer lead responsibility for security from the UK to the Afghan government in early 2011, with the intention for the full transfer to be completed by the end of 2014. This will allow British troops within a combat role to withdraw from Afghanistan by 2015, which was described as a "firm deadline". However, the transfer of security responsibility for districts and provinces to Afghan control will happen as soon as they are ready based on the conditions on the ground and not timetables. Over time there will be greater Afghan autonomy and responsibility. As part of this UK forces will support:

- Offensive military action. ISAF must conduct Offensive military action during Clear and Hold against the insurgents who continue to pose a major threat to the legitimate Afghan Government either with the support of, or in support of, the developing Afghan security forces until they are able to sustain their own security.
- Isolating the insurgents from support of the Afghan population. Isolated insurgents without the support of the Afghan population, undermining the insurgents capacity both to regenerate, which includes its ability to recruit and adapt. It is the UK's position that an Afghan lead is vital for both security operations and for building support.
- Training, mentoring and development. Afghan security forces capable of managing Afghanistan's own security and of planning and conducting effective independent operations in order to defeat the irreconcilable elements of the Afghan insurgency and prevent terrorists from using Afghanistan as a 'launch pad' to attack other countries. It is the UK's position that it must support the training, mentoring and development of the Afghan security forces, including directly supporting the training and development of the Afghan officers' command and leadership abilities.

Longer term military support. Once the Afghan authorities are capable of sustaining their own security and the lead responsibility for security has transitioned to Afghan control by the end of 2014, the UK will continue to support the elected Afghan government via its developing long-term partnership plan militarily, politically and economically.

=== Afghan Governance ===
End State Objective: Effective, legitimate Afghan governance at every level, working with the confidence of local communities, to help them to shape their own future by providing a political voice for all Afghans, with consistency, not corruption, at its heart.

- Effective Governance. Supporting the development of educated, capable Afghans willing to take on a role within the Afghan Government and Civil Service.
- Rights and Civil Society. The development of both a system of rights reflecting the will of the Afghan people and a civil society that will hold the Afghan Government to account at all levels.
- Justice and dispute resolution. Development, by Afghans, of impartial and accessible systems of justice and dispute resolution that respond to the desire for predictable and non-corrupt justice applied equally to the governing and the governed. This includes the development of both the formal sector and informal community based sector.
- Isolating the insurgent shadow governance mechanisms. Isolated Taliban shadow governors, institutions and dispute resolution, undermining the perceived legitimacy of the insurgents with the Afghan population.
- Political Settlement. It is the UK's position that the realisation of a long term stability in Afghanistan is achieved through a political settlement that enables the population to 'feel that it's their government, their country and that they have a role to play'. It is the UK's position that this cannot be achieved through military means alone, although the UK considers it important to the political process to maintain "intensified military pressure". Increasingly from early 2011, the UK considers that Afghanistan is not in a vacuum, that a regional settlement is required that needs to consider its relationships with its neighbours and the long-term implications of the settlement in the region in order to generate constructive relationships supporting sustainable stability. The UK considers that:

# The process must be led by the Afghan Government and supported by the UK.
# The political settlement will comprise many initiatives involving multiple parties and regional leaderships, appear "messy", but ultimately "Afghan-based, Afghan-focused and Afghan-dependent".
# Those Taliban and insurgents who are not ideologically committed to Al-Qaeda, reconcilable to the basic tenets of the Afghan constitution and the concept of democratic government, willing to reject and renounce violence should be reintegrated and reconciled with Afghan society.
# Those who are irreconcilable need to be dealt with by military means.

=== Afghan Development ===
End State Objective: An Afghan Government able to maintain the support of the Afghan population by being responsive to its needs and delivering meaningful economic and social progress enabling the Afghan population to feel that they have more of a stake in their well-being.

- Essential services and Quality of Life. The UK must support the development of education, health care, electricity, clean water, jobs and economic development, alongside fair justice.
- Economic Liberty. The Afghan population able to exercise their economic liberty inside a free market.

=== Afghan-Pakistan co-operation ===
End State Objective: Extending the writ of the Pakistani authorities over the Northwest frontier province and FATA.

- Comprehensive approach. Complementary strategies and co-operation between ISAF, and Afghan and Pakistani forces on either side of the border region involving a comprehensive approach based on security, governance and development. The UK considers that the "greatest strategic challenge is security in the wider region, including security in the vulnerable cross-border area".
