= Mark Carleton-Smith =

British Army general (born 1964)

General Sir Mark Carleton-Smith GCB CBE DL
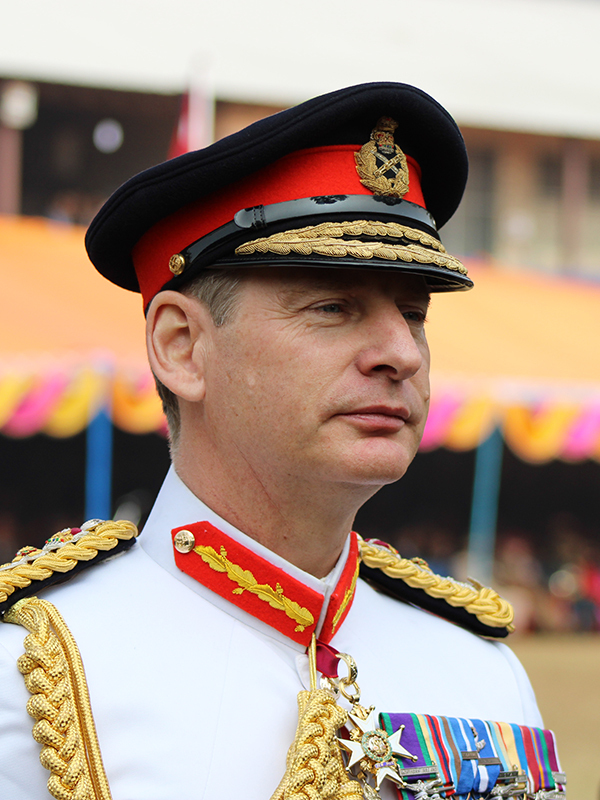
- Carleton-Smith in 2018
- Born: 9 February 1964 (age 62); Bielefeld, West Germany
- Spouse: Catherine Nalder (m. 1991)
- Children: 2
- Military career
- Allegiance: United Kingdom
- Branch: British Army
- Service years: 1982–2022
- Rank: General
- Service number: 515762
- Unit: Irish Guards
- Commands: Chief of the General Staff (2018–2022); Director Special Forces (2012–2015); Task Force Helmand (2008); 16 Air Assault Brigade (2007–2008); 22 Special Air Service (2002–2005)
- Conflicts: The Troubles; Gulf War; Kosovo War; Iraq War; War in Afghanistan
- Awards: Knight Grand Cross of the Order of the Bath; Commander of the Order of the British Empire; Queen's Commendation for Valuable Service

General Sir Mark Alexander Popham Carleton-Smith, GCB, CBE, DL (born 9 February 1964) is a senior British Army officer who served as Chief of the General Staff from June 2018 to June 2022. He previously served as Director Special Forces and commanded 22 Special Air Service Regiment.

== Early life and education ==
Born on 9 February 1964 at Bielefeld, West Germany, to Major General Sir Michael Carleton-Smith, he began his education at Cheltenham College Junior School, before attending Eton College, an all-boys public school. In 1982, he went to Hatfield College, Durham, to pursue an Army-sponsored degree in Politics and Modern History. He graduated from Durham University with a lower second class Bachelor of Arts degree in 1985.

== Military career ==
Carleton-Smith was commissioned into the Irish Guards on 3 September 1982, before going up to Durham, graduating as BA. He was promoted to lieutenant on 6 September 1985 (with seniority from 9 April), then to captain on 9 April 1989, and then to major on 30 September 1995. After operational service in Northern Ireland during the Troubles, he was deployed to the Gulf War in 1991, and then saw active service as an SAS squadron commander in Bosnia later in the 1990s.

Carleton-Smith became chief of staff of 19 Mechanized Brigade in 1999 and served as chief of staff HQ Multi-National Brigade Centre during the Kosovo War later that year. In recognition of his military service in Kosovo, he was appointed a Member of the Order of the British Empire (MBE) in the 2000 New Year Honours, and then awarded the Queen's Commendation for Valuable Service on 3 November 2000.

Promoted to lieutenant colonel on 30 June 2001, Carleton-Smith became military assistant to the commander-in-chief, land forces, becoming commanding officer of 22 Special Air Service Regiment in 2002. After serving during the 2003 invasion of Iraq and also during operations in Afghanistan, he was advanced Officer of the Order of the British Empire (OBE) on 23 April 2004. Promoted colonel on 30 June 2005, he became deputy director policy planning at the Ministry of Defence at that time.

Promoted to brigadier on 31 December 2006 with seniority from 30 June 2006, Carleton-Smith became commander of 16 Air Assault Brigade that year and was deployed to Afghanistan as commander of Task Force Helmand and commander of British Forces there in April 2008. In August 2008 he led Operation Eagle's Summit, which involved a daring foray into Taliban territory. He was promoted Commander of the Order of the British Empire (CBE) for his services in Afghanistan on 6 March 2009.

Carleton-Smith became director of army plans and resources at the Ministry of Defence in January 2009 and, following promotion to major general on 20 February 2012, he became Director Special Forces. In July 2022, the BBC published a report alleging evidence that "SAS operatives in Afghanistan repeatedly killed detainees and unarmed men in suspicious circumstances," while Carleton-Smith, then Director Special Forces, "failed to pass on evidence to [the] murder inquiry" which was being conducted by the Royal Military Police.

Appointed director of strategy at the Army Headquarters in March 2015, he became Deputy Chief of the Defence Staff (Military Strategy and Operations) on 18 April 2016 being promoted to lieutenant general with effect from the same date. On 11 June 2018 he was further promoted to the rank of general, succeeding General Sir Nick Carter as Chief of the General Staff, being appointed Knight Commander of the Order of the Bath (KCB) in the 2019 New Year Honours. Succeeded as Chief of the General Staff by General Sir Patrick Sanders in June 2022, Carleton-Smith was promoted Knight Grand Cross of the Order of the Bath (GCB) in the 2023 Birthday Honours.

Carleton-Smith served as regimental lieutenant colonel of the Irish Guards from 18 March 2012 for ten years, and as honorary colonel of Oxford University Officers Training Corps between February 2017 and June 2022.

== Personal life ==
In 1991, Carleton-Smith married Catherine Nalder. They have a son and a daughter. He is a member of Pratt's, the Pilgrims Society and the Chelsea Arts Clubs.

Carleton-Smith was appointed a deputy lieutenant of Herefordshire on 27 September 2023.

== Honours and awards ==
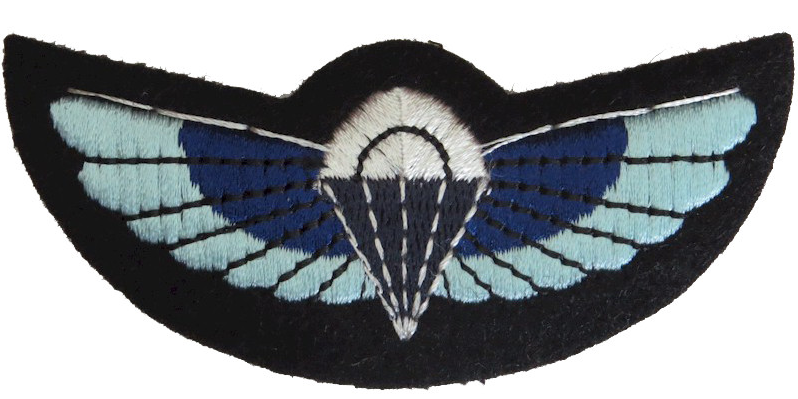

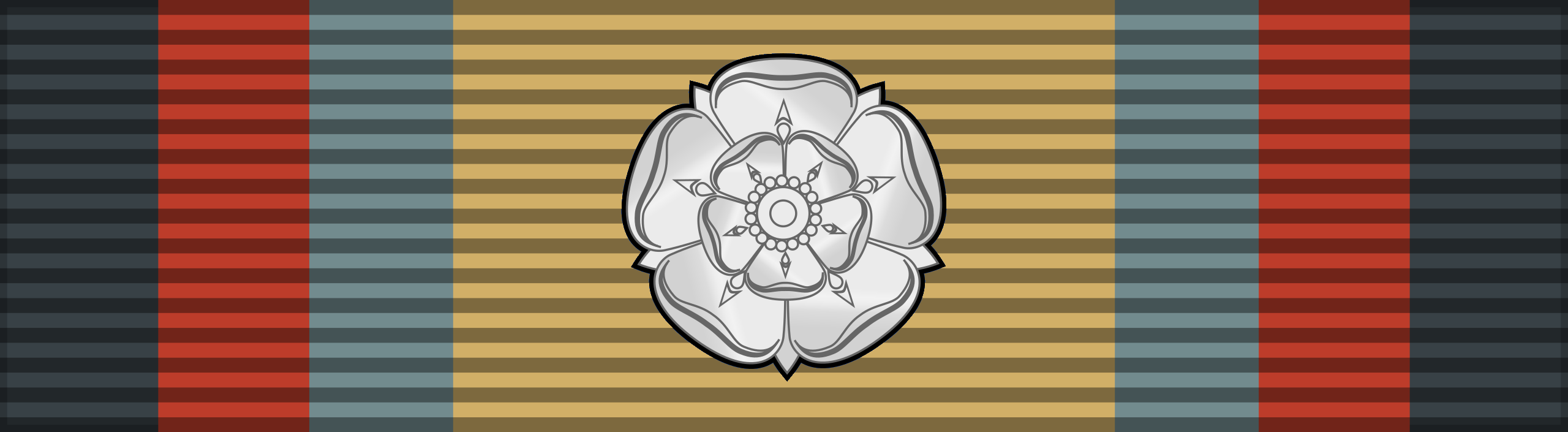

Ribbon	Description	Notes
	Knight Grand Cross of the Most Honourable Order of the Bath (GCB)	Appointed in 2023
	Commander of the Most Excellent Order of the British Empire (CBE)	Appointed in 2009
	General Service Medal (1962)	
	Gulf Medal	
	UN Medal for Former Yugoslavia	
	NATO Former Republic of Yugoslavia Medal	
	NATO Kosovo Medal	Queen's Commendation for Valuable Service
	Operational Service Medal for Afghanistan	
	Iraq Medal	
	Queen Elizabeth II Golden Jubilee Medal	
	Queen Elizabeth II Diamond Jubilee Medal	
	Queen Elizabeth II Platinum Jubilee Medal	
	Accumulated Campaign Service Medal	
	Medal for Long Service and Good Conduct (Military)	With 2 Bars
	Officer of the Legion of Merit	

Military offices
Preceded by Jacko Page	Director Special Forces; 2012–2015	Succeeded by James Chiswell
Preceded by Gordon Messenger	Deputy Chief of the Defence Staff (Military Strategy and Operations); 2016–2018	Succeeded by Douglas Chalmers
Preceded by Sir Nick Carter	Chief of the General Staff; 2018–2022	Succeeded by Sir Patrick Sanders
