= Abdul Ghafour (Taliban commander) =

Mullah Abdul Ghafour
- Died: 4 February 2007; Musa Qala
- Military career
- Allegiance: Taliban
- Rank: Commander

Mullah Abdul Ghafour was a Taliban commander that ISAF forces claim was killed by an airstrike on February 4, 2007.

== Summary executions in January 2001 ==
The Afghan Justice Project described the execution of hundreds of civilians when the Taliban reoccupied Yakaolong:

"The massacre of non-combatants in Yakaolang began on Sunday, January 7, 2001. . Most killings were conducted on January 8. Taliban forces remained in the area until January 22, and carried out more summary executions that day. The total number killed during this period is at least 178 who have been provisionally identified, of whom 175 were civilians and 3 were military hors de combat. It has not been possible to obtain a more precise figure because of the difficulty in getting reliable, comprehensive lists of people killed in the mass arrests and firing squads."

The Afghan Justice Project identified Mullah Shahzad, Mullah Abdul Sattar, and Mullah Abdul Ghaffar as the three most senior Taliban responsible for the alleged massacre. It reported:

"Mullah Abdul Ghaffar was another Qandahari Pushtun Talib, not known in the area, who acted as a field commander during the operation. He had responsibility for the upper Darra Ali area and supervised the search operations there during January 8. During the operation, Taliban in Kabul informed the researcher the Ahmadullah had a coordinating role, for the simultaneous operations in Saighan, Kamard and Yakaolang. Already from January 7, the units in Yakaolang were expecting his arrival. Although he may not have physically gone to Yakaolang until the Tuesday or the Wednesday, when the main killing was over, he clearly had senior level responsibility in the command structure from the inception of the operation."

== Occupation of Musa Qala, February 2007 ==
A unit of several hundred Taliban soldiers occupied Musa Qala on February 2, 2007. Eurasianet reports: "The attack laid waste to an agreement there, brokered last fall by Richards and local tribal elders, under which NATO troops agreed to withdraw from the town in return for a commitment by local Afghan leaders to oppose the Taliban."

British General David J. Richards, an expert at negotiation, is the outgoing NATO commander. Eurasianet reports that the new NATO commander, American General Dan McNeill, opposes the kind of local agreements that Richards favored, and speculated that the aerial bombardment that was reported to have killed Mullah Abdul Ghafour was a sign of McNeill's more aggressive, less conciliatory approach.

"Officials in several European countries have quietly expressed concern about placing an American general in charge of the NATO force. Richards tried to create a less harsh, more economic-development-oriented identity for NATO in Afghanistan, as compared to the kicking-down-doors image that US forces have. Many local analysts expect NATO forces to embrace a more aggressive stance under McNeill, who is believed to oppose the type of local peace arrangements that Richards promoted. The danger at this point is that an overly aggressive NATO force in Afghanistan could alienate Afghans, and thus cause the Taliban's support base to grow."
