= Musa Qala River =

River in Afghanistan

Coordinates: 32.0971°N 64.8356°E

The Musa Qala (Pashto: د موسى قلعه رود) is a river in Afghanistan. It is a tributary of the Helmand River and highly participates in the irrigation of arable lands of the Musa Qala district in Helmand Province. It flows for 90 km through the district from north to south.
