= Volley sight =

Type of rifle aiming device

A volley sight is a form of sight fitted to some military rifles at the end of the 19th century. They were used for long-range volley fire; massed-fire, usually defensive, from a group of riflemen. Separate volley sights lasted in service for around 30 years.

== Development of volley fire ==
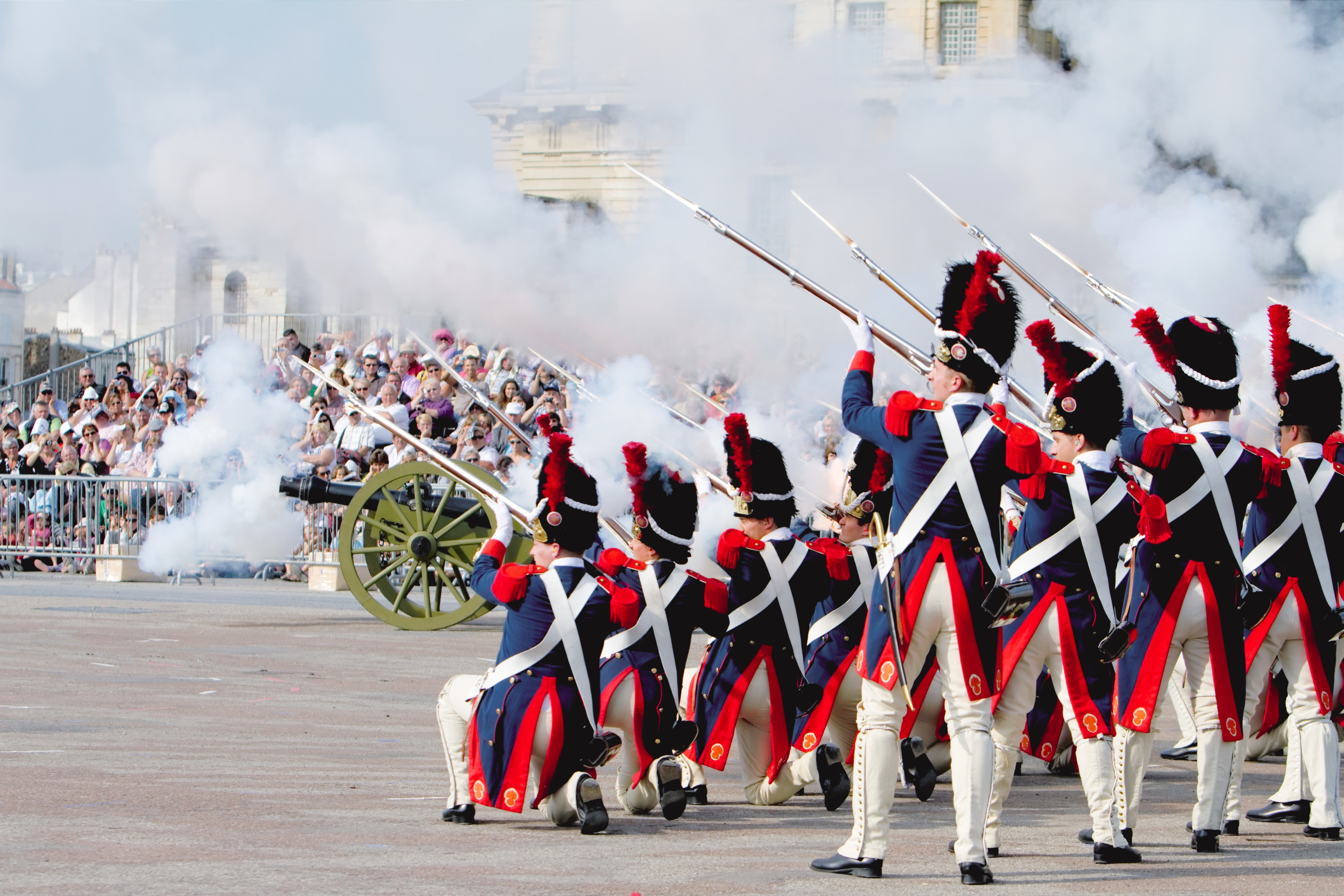
Napoleonic re-enactors demonstrate volley fire from two ranks

Point-blank volleys

Massed volley fire had been part of musketry since the development of small arms, even from the era of matchlocks. However this had been carried out at almost point-blank ranges. Massed groups of line infantrymen faced each other across a battlefield and fired by rows. After each row fired, they kneeled to reload and the row behind could fire over their heads. This tactic depended upon good drill, in order to maintain a disciplined rank under fire and also to reload quickly and in unison. Accuracy of these smoothbore fusils was poor and with dense clouds of powder smoke it was hard to see individual enemy, let alone target them effectively.

Black powder cartridge volleys

Black powder rifles such as the 1853 Enfield and then breechloaders with black powder cartridge like the Snider-Enfield of 1866 increased the rate of fire, accuracy and also the range. Rifles were now accurate enough that interest developed in accurate marksmanship at ranges up to 500 yards.

Smokeless volleys

Towards the end of the 19th century, smokeless powder allowed the production of rifle cartridges with greater range and rates of fire than previous black powder cartridges. The aerodynamically improved Spitzer bullet also increased range and made shooting at long ranges more accurate. In particular, they also maintained velocity, thus lethality, at these long ranges. The first rifles to deliberately take advantage of this ability were the French Lebel Model 1886 rifle and the German Gewehr 1888.

Long-range volleys

By the 1860s, rifle fire was now lethal at long ranges, further than it could be accurately aimed. At this range, the soldier would not be able to see his target. The idea was that soldiers would fire in ranks, creating a beaten zone that approaching forces had to traverse through.

Volley fire could still be used in a manner similar to artillery indirect fire, where it was aimed without direct line of sight to the target, or to an individual target. Riflemen aimed at groups, typically massed attacks, but not at specific individual targets. For this use, some means of gun laying was needed to set the elevation and thus control the range. This was also an era of colonial wars where a small group of well-armed soldiers might face massed attacks by a much larger force of poorly armed locals.

The effectiveness of shooting to 2,800 yards with a blackpowder rifle designed in 1888 is often questioned, given that the longest confirmed sniper kill to date, by Corporal Craig Harrison in 2009 stands at 2,706 yd (2,474 m) with a L115A3 Long Range Rifle. However there is evidence that volley firing at ultra long range was used successfully. In the Second Boer War, at Escourt in 1899, volleys delivered at 2,900 yards by the Royal Dublin Fusiliers succeeded in "clearing the Boers from the town, to which several were killed or wounded." Contemporary books on tactics stated that "even at 3000 yards marching in fours is dangerous."

Machine gun fire

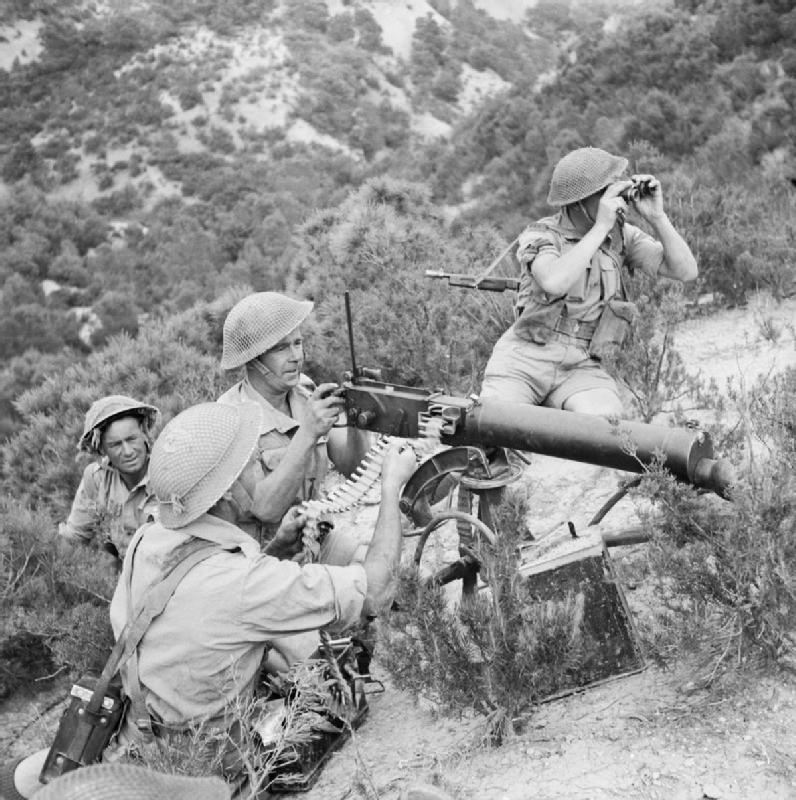
Vickers machine gun crew in Tunisia, 1943. Note the extreme height of the rear ladder sight.

During the First World War, the medium machine gun came to dominate the battlefield. Even a few of these guns, emplaced with good cover, could dominate large areas and make enemy advance impossible. Volley fire was now the domain of these machine guns. Their standard sights, usually a tall ladder sight, were capable of controlling volley fire, without needing a separate sighting system. They could also be fitted with a clinometer to give indirect fire, aiming at a map reference rather than a visible target.

== Designs ==
=== Ladder sights ===
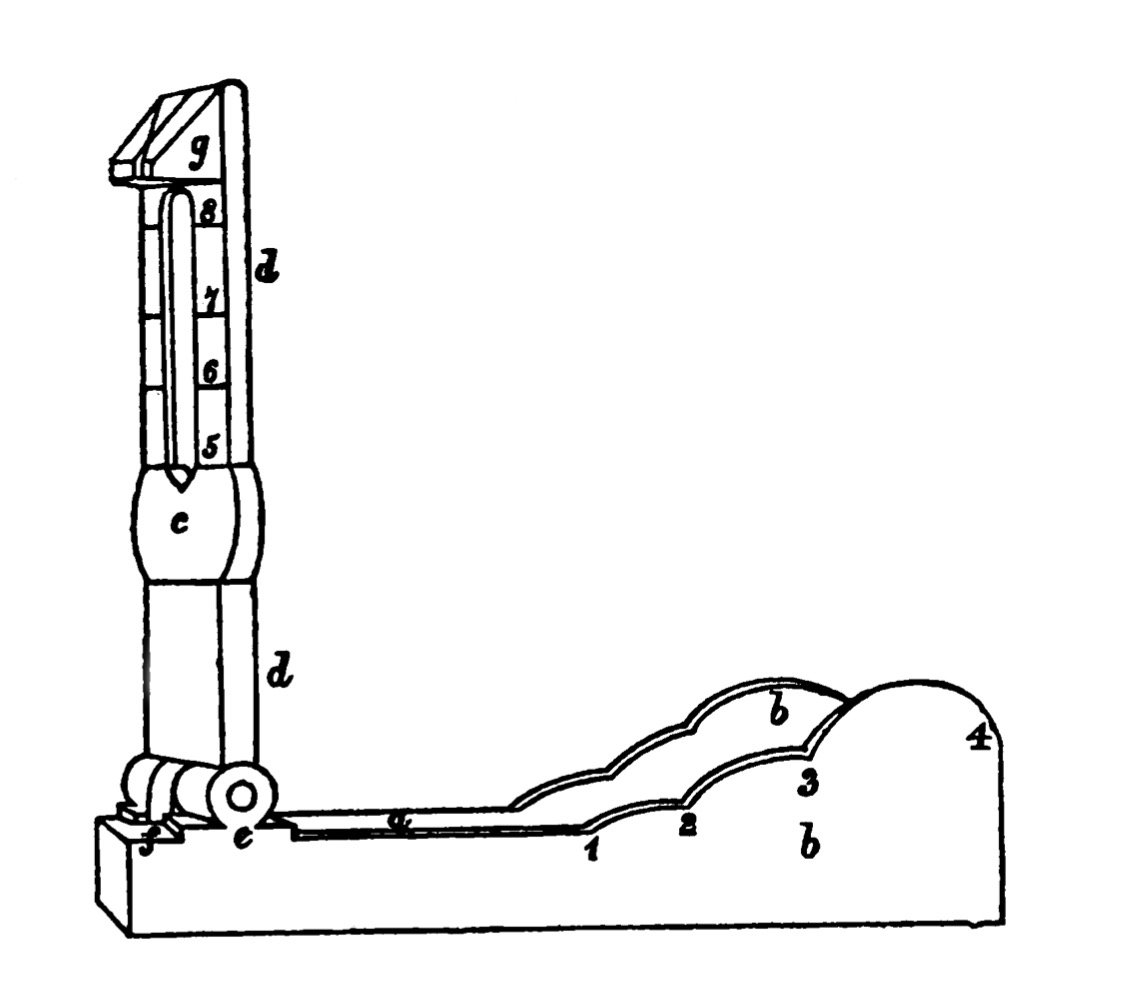
Pattern 1853 ladder rear sight

By the era of volley sights, rifles already had a ladder backsight. This was an iron peepsight, without any optics, but it was adjustable for range. A vertical 'ladder' had either markings against it, calibrated for range, or had a vee or rear aperture sight which could be moved up and down this ladder and set against the relevant range marker. Because the sight was so tall, it was arranged to fold forwards along the barrel of the rifle when not in use. There was usually also a 'battle sight' for short ranges that was used with the sight still folded, in case the rifleman suddenly needed to engage an enemy, or was at close range. Sometimes this battle sight might be a protruding part of the ladder (illustrated), visible when in the folded position. Sometimes it was a separate notch sight, closer to the rifleman's eye than the ladder backsight to give the longest sighting radius and accuracy. It may itself have a separate fold up leaf, for two range estimates.

A typical volley sight of this era was calibrated from 200 to 800 yards. The battle sight might be calibrated for 100 and 300 yards.

With volley fire as a goal, it's relatively easy to extend the ladder sight for ranges > 2,000 yards. A taller ladder with a new notch is needed The foresight might also be changed; a foresight set low down or only halfway along the barrel gives greater elevation for a ladder sight of the same size. Although the sight radius is shortened, thus accuracy is slightly reduced, this is not an issue for volley fire.

=== Enfield-Martini and the first hanging sight ===
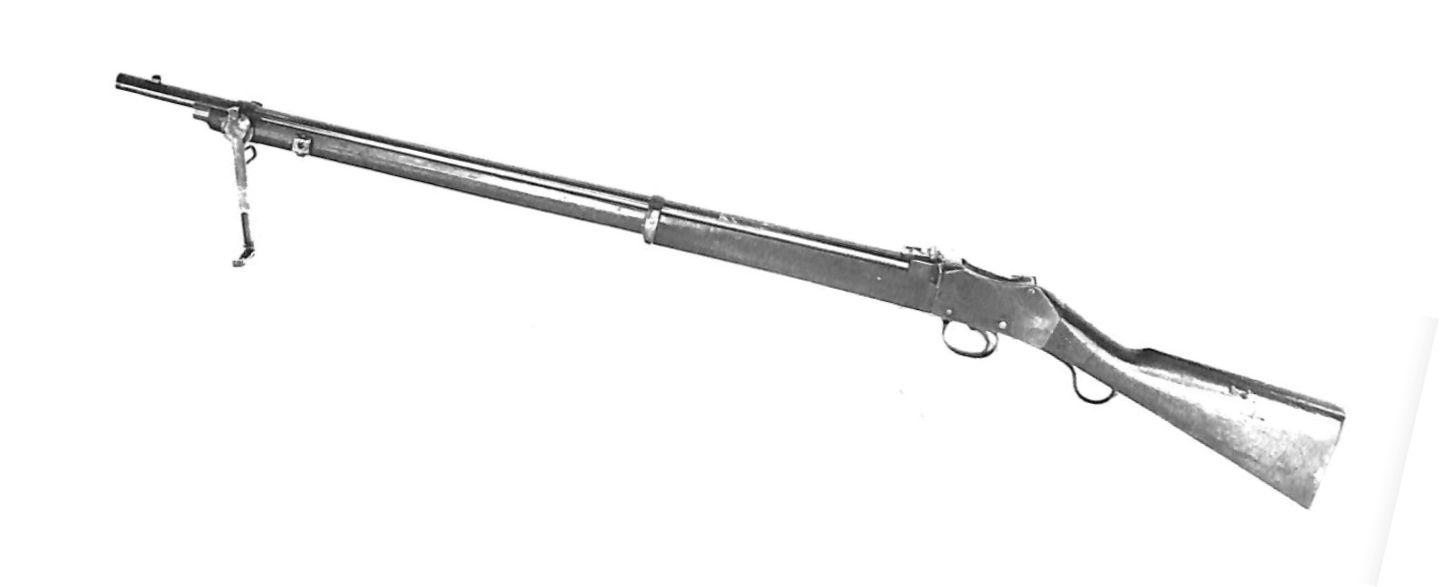
Enfield-Martini, 1882 The rifle is elevated to the approximate angle used for volley firing.

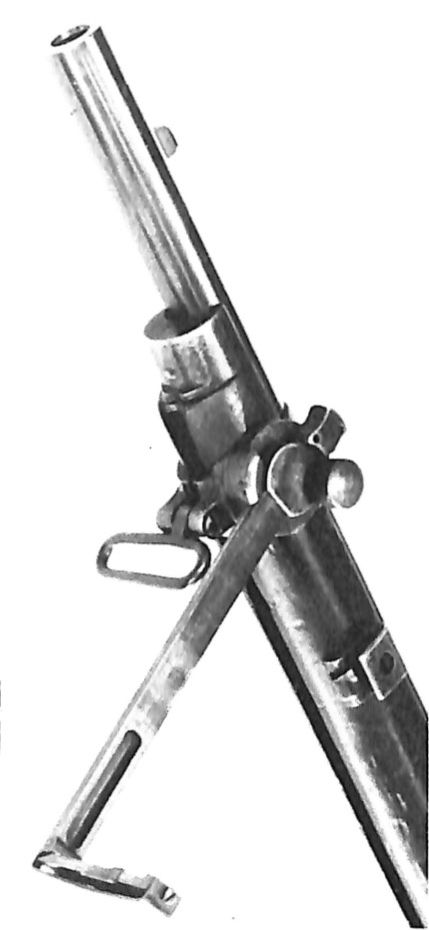
The Enfield-Martini volley foresight

In 1882 a new small-bore calibre round was under development in Britain and a rifle, the .402 Enfield-Martini, was developed with which to evaluate it. This was the first rifle to have dedicated volley sights. A similar pattern was continued onto the Lee-Metford and then the Lee-Enfield.

Recognising the extreme range that was now possible with this round, it was fitted with a deliberate and separate volley sight for volley fire at long ranges. The extreme range would also require an unusually steep elevation angle, and so a sight that was also unusually tall vertically. Rather than the backsight folding up, the fore sight folded down as a 'hanging' sight.

The backsight has two leaves, the regular one graduated for up to 1,000 yards and a new leaf for the volley sight folding out to the left side with a V notch. A further 5 3/4" long bar near the fore sight can be swung down to below the main sight, allowing sighting out to 2,100 yards.

=== Lee-Metford and the dial sight ===
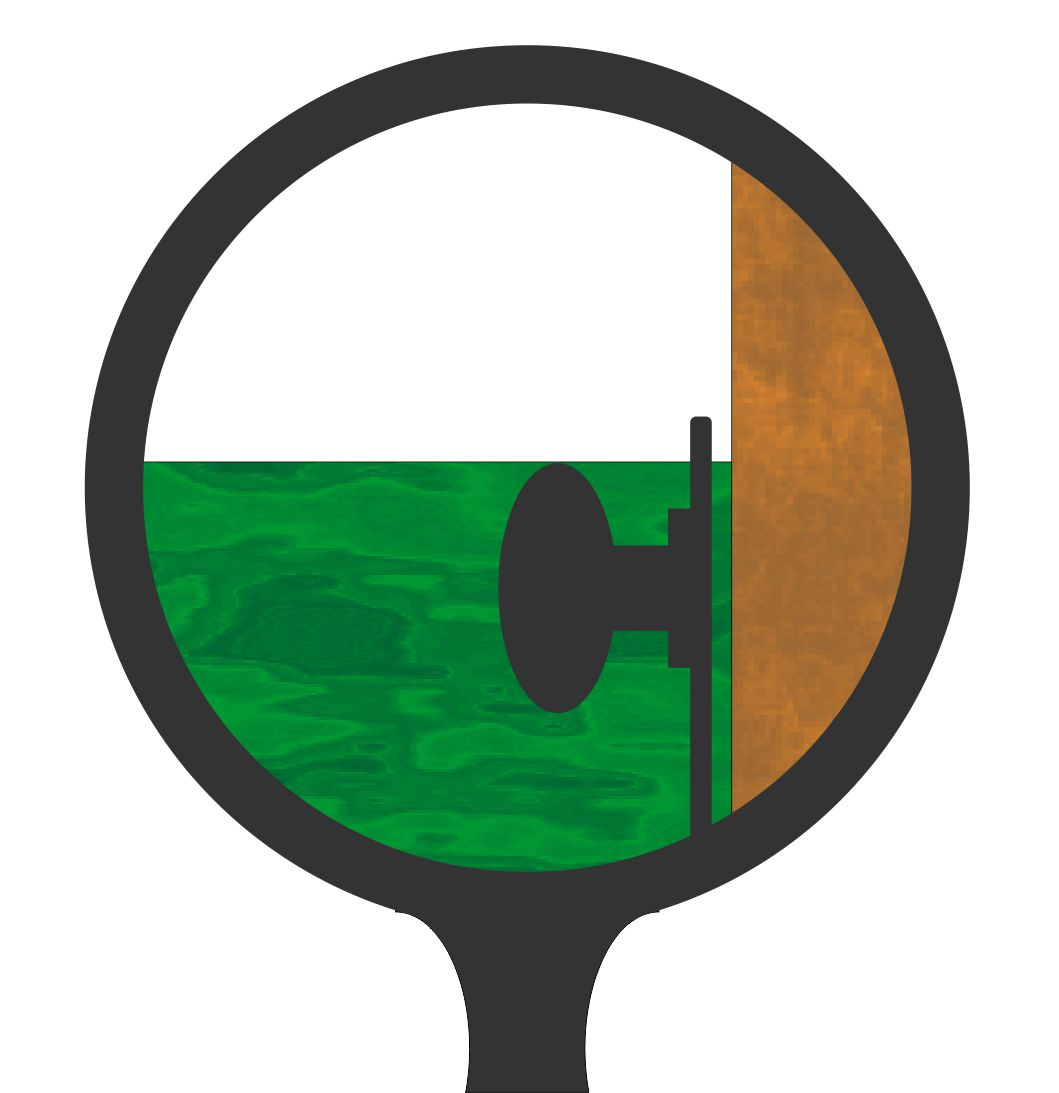
Sight picture of the volley sight of a Lee-Metford rifle

A new design of volley sight described as the 'dial sight' or 'extreme range sight' was produced for the .303 Lee-Metford rifle of 1888, the first British military small bore rifle to enter service. The main sights were invented by Col. G.A. Lewes and the subject of a patent, it is not known if he was also the inventor of the volley sight. This 'dial sight' pattern became characteristic of British volley sights.

This new volley sight was more easily adjustable for range than earlier types. The volley sight was in two parts, both attached to the left side of the stock and rotating down on a transverse horizontal axis against a recess in the stock, giving some degree of protection. The rear sight was a ring sight on a vertical iron lever. Unlike most other sights, the range adjustment was done on the fore sight, not the back sight. The fore sight was a rounded horizontal post, mounted on a lever which moved against a scale calibrated for range, so the sight could be moved through a sweep of positions for range. There was no sideways or windage adjustment, as the sight was intended to guide elevation, not azimuth.

In use the rear sight was folded up and the fore sight folded forwards. The lever pointed rearwards when not in use, and pointed forwards, either above or below (maximum range) horizontal, when in use. To sight the rifle the front and rear sight were aligned on the horizon, the barrel now pointing upwards at an elevation according to the range on the fore sight's scale.

== Examples ==
Martini–Henry

The .577/450 cartridge Martini–Henry Mk II of 1877 was fitted with a ladder sight calibrated to either 1,200 or 1,400 yards, which was beyond the range of accurate fire, but still useful for volley fire. Rear leaves were also made marked for ranges out to 1,800 yards.

Enfield-Martini

The Enfield-Martini introduced the first deliberately separate volley sight in 1882.

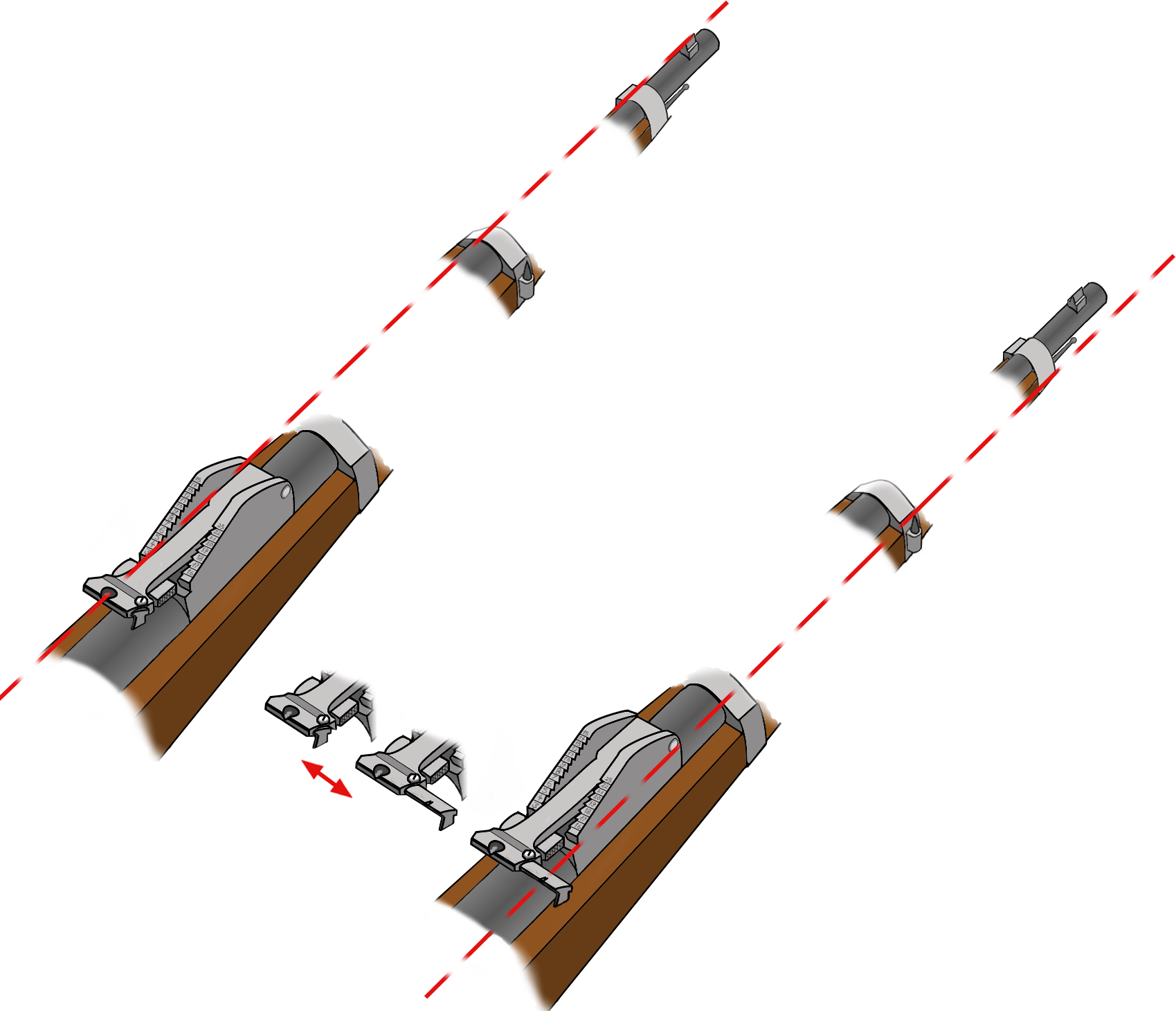
Mannlicher M1886 using the conventional sight (left) and the volley sight (right)

Jarmann M1884

The Swedish models of the Norwegian Jarmann M1884 had an additional sidemounted volley sight, intended for indirect volley fire over long distances, from 1,600 to 2,400 metres (1,700 to 2,600 yd). This sight was designed by the Swedish Colonel Holkin. A second notch on the ladder sight elevator used a pin mounted on the left-hand side of a barrel band as a foresight.

Mannlicher M1886

The Mannlicher M1886 backsight was a tangent type and had two separate range scales, one on each side of the sight protector. By extending a pull-out notch on the sight leaf, the long range markings could be used, using a pin attached to the right-hand side of the rifle's front band as an alternative volley fore sight, similar to the Swedish Jarmann. This sight was marked for ranges of 1,600 to 2,300 paces; 1,200 to 1,725 metres (1,312 to 1,886 yd).

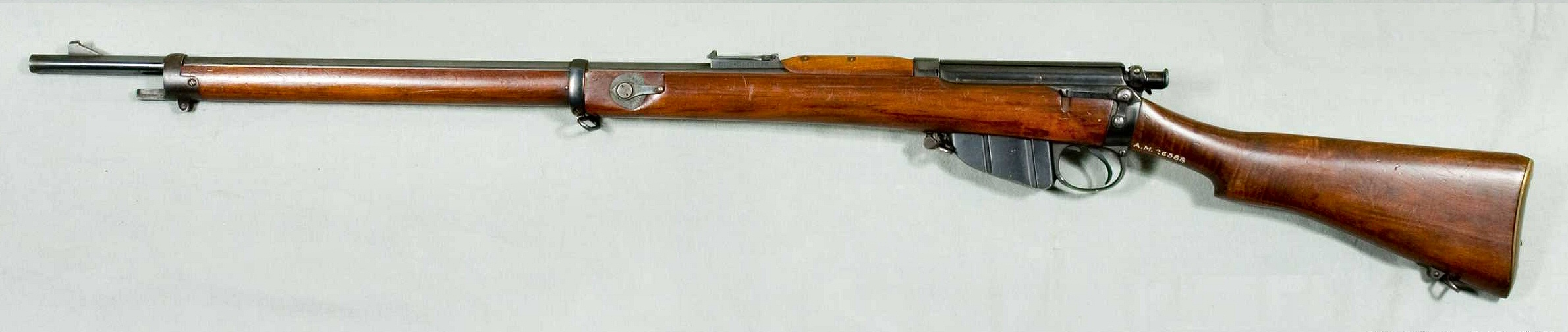
Lee–Metford

Lee–Metford

The Lee–Metford of 1888 introduced the British pattern of dial volley sight that would be used throughout their era, and on the first mass-production rifle. This sight covered ranges from 1,700 to 2,900 yards. It was in two parts, both of which folded against the stock for protection in carriage and in nearly all use, the volley sight being rarely used. The foresight was a dial sight on the left of the stock, with a bead to act as a foresight that could be moved in the vertical plane by rotating a calibrated dial. Rotating the dial to the opposite position stowed the foresight in a recess against the stock. The aperture backsight was a cup with a peep-hole in it, on the end of a bar. This bar also rotated for stowage, pivoting on the stem of the locking bolt.

The first pattern assumed an over-optimistic range for the new cordite propellants and the dial sight was graduated out to 3,500 yards. The 2nd pattern corrected this to 2,900 yards, which carried on onto the Mk I*.

Mosin–Nagant

The original Mosin–Nagant of 1891 had a Lebel combination tangent and ladder sight with a flat blade sitting between the side rails, calibrated to 2,700 arshini (2,100 yards). (Note: Arshini (singular: arshin) or 'paces' are an archaic Russian unit equal to 28".) From 1908 the 7.62×54mmR round was changed from the 210 gr (14 g) round-nose bullet to a much lighter 150 gr (9.7 g) spitzer bullet. The better ballistics and extra range this gave required a new sight, the Konovalov pattern rear leaf, on the original base. This was now wider, overlapping the side rails, and was calibrated to 3,200 arshini (2,500 yards). The 1893 dragoon version of the Mosin–Nagant was a shortened version (by 3") for mounted infantry, but longer than a carbine. These also had the Konovalov sight leaf from the outset.

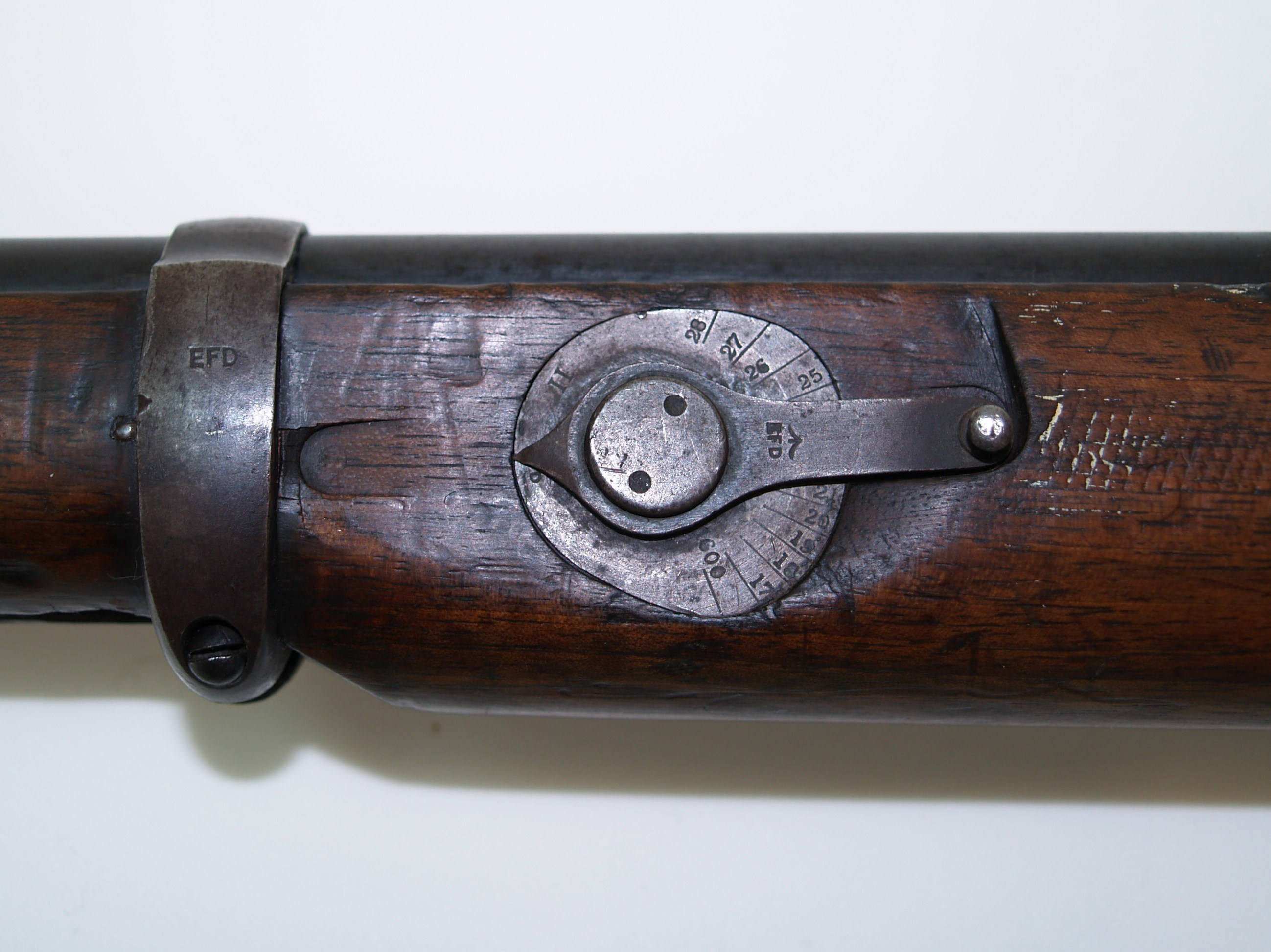
Dial fore sight of an early 'long' Lee-Enfield Mk I*

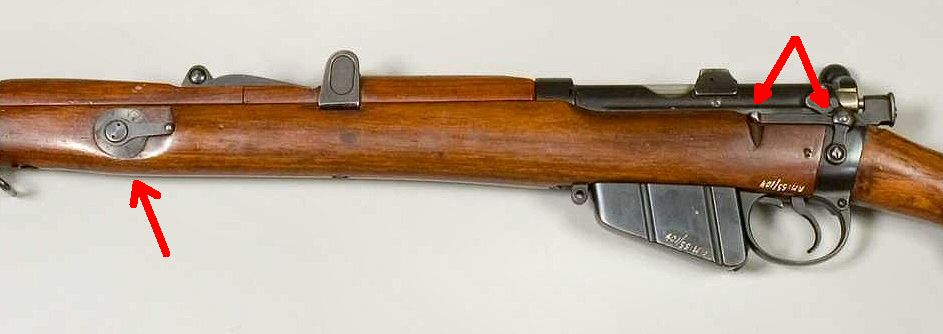
Short magazine Lee–Enfield Mk III The dial sight and the fold-up peep sight are indicated.

Lee-Enfield

The Lee-Enfield gradually replaced the Lee-Metford from around 1895. The major change was the deeper Enfield rifling replacing the Metford system, designed for blackpowder. With newer, hotter smokeless powders, the erosion rate had been excessive. The Lee-Metford's long-range sight carried onto the Lee-Enfield. Despite the new ammunition, the calibration of the dial sight was reduced slightly from 2,900 yards to 2,800.

The major variant was the Short magazine Lee–Enfield Mk III of 1907 to 1915. After this, the Mk III* was cost-engineered for wartime needs and deleted some features, such as the volley sight. The III* was not approved for production for some time and so later manufacture Mk III already included many of the simplifications.

Springfield M1903

The Springfield M1903 had a complicated ladder sight with five different apertures in the M1905 version of the sight. The very top of the ladder had a notch for volley fire at 2,850 yards.

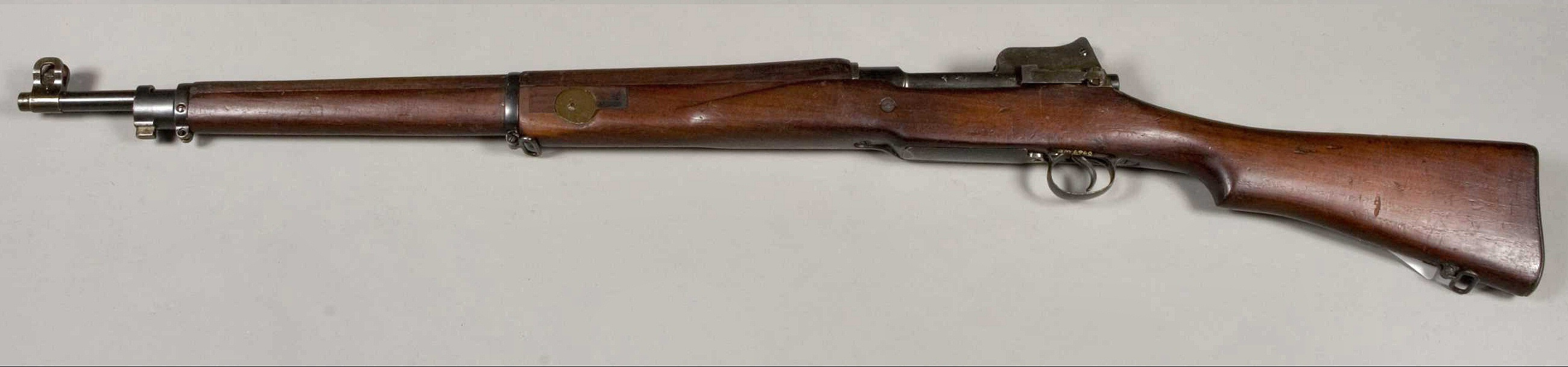
P14 Enfield, with the volley sight removed and the wooden stock patched over.

P14 Enfield

The last rifle to have a deliberate volley sight fitted was the P14 Enfield. These were of the Lee-Enfield pattern and calibrated to 2,600 yards.

The P14 was introduced in the middle of WWI. Its design began pre-war with a deliberate goal of producing an accurate long-range .276 Enfield round to equal the Mauser fire which had outranged the SMLE during the Boer War; wartime expediency though left it as little more than a production shortcut, using the same .303 round but being built in the non-combatant USA. By the end of the war, over a million of these rifles had been produced. During the interbellum period most of these remained in store, or were sold to friendly nations, notably the Baltic states. During the great invasion panic at the outbreak of WWII, especially after the loss of materiel at Dunkirk, these rifles now became militarily important to British forces. A rapid program to refurbish them, the 'Weedon Repair Standard', was put in place. This included the removal of the volley sight. Early refurbishments involved removing the sight and infilling the stock with a wooden patch. More hurried refurbishments simply removed the moving pointer, leaving the original dial in place.

== Withdrawal ==
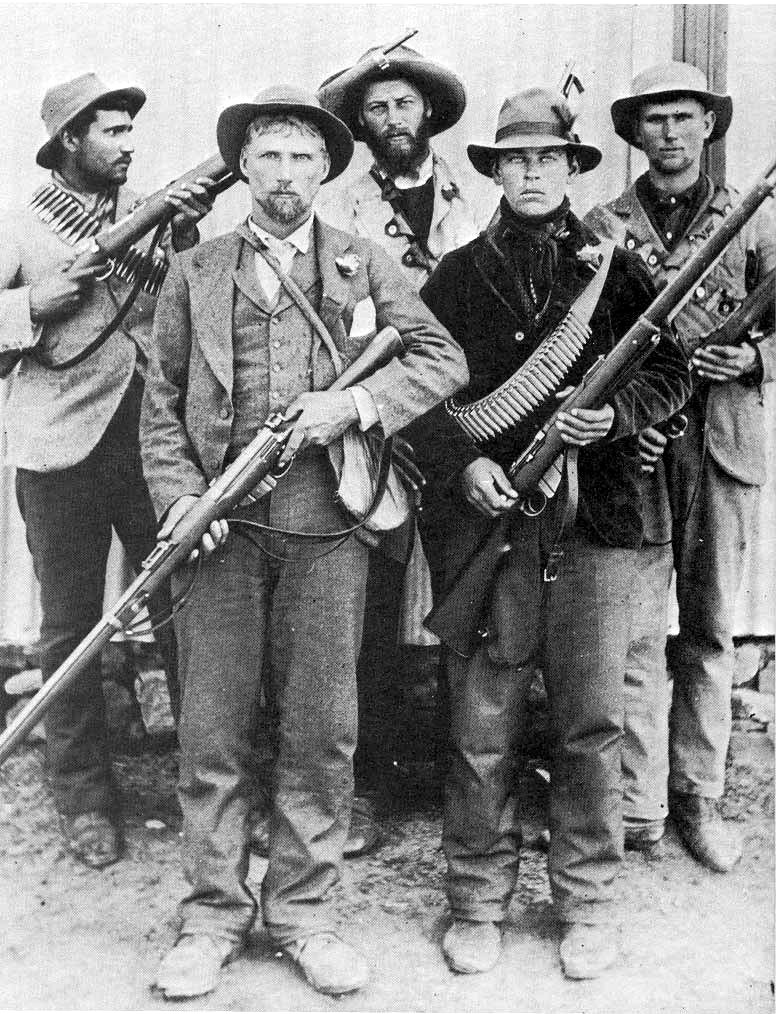
A Boer commando around 1900 The figure front left is carrying a captured British Lee-Metford with a dial volley sight

By around 1910, the era of volley sights, and even massed volley fire by riflemen, was over. The era of the volley sight ended for several reasons:

- Colonial wars no longer involved large numbers of lightly armed indigenous warriors against a small force of well-armed Europeans. The rapid transition in 1880 from the Zulu War to the First Boer War left the British entirely unprepared for sniping attacks by commandos, even though the Boer were mostly using a Westley Richards capping breechloader that was slower to fire than the Martin-Henry. By the Second Boer War, the Boer had acquired large numbers of bolt-action, magazine-fed Mauser rifles comparable to the Lee-Metford. Even though the famous marksmanship of the First Boer War was replaced by 'pumping lead' from the magazine-fed Mauser, the value of disciplined volley fire was seen as diminished, but not removed.
- Machine guns became widespread. One machine gun could replace the volley fire of a company with a crew of just four. They were also more suited to this type of massed fire, leaving aimed fire for the riflemen. This was encouraged with weapons such as the Vickers or Lewis, where they used the same ammunition as the riflemen. The water-cooled Vickers in particular excelled at long-range indirect fire and was regularly fired continuously for long periods as area denial.
- The rapid advances at the opening of World War I and the mobile phase of the Race to the Sea gave way to the stalemate of trench warfare. Volley fire was useless here, as troops took refuge behind, or beneath, earthworks. Machine guns dug into protected firing points now dominated the battlefield. Even though volley fire was not widely used, these machine guns acted as a 'fleet in being' and prevented any advance or even unprotected movement behind the lines. Only when one of the infamously bloody 'over the top' assaults was made, the terrible effect of long-range machine gun fire was made obvious.

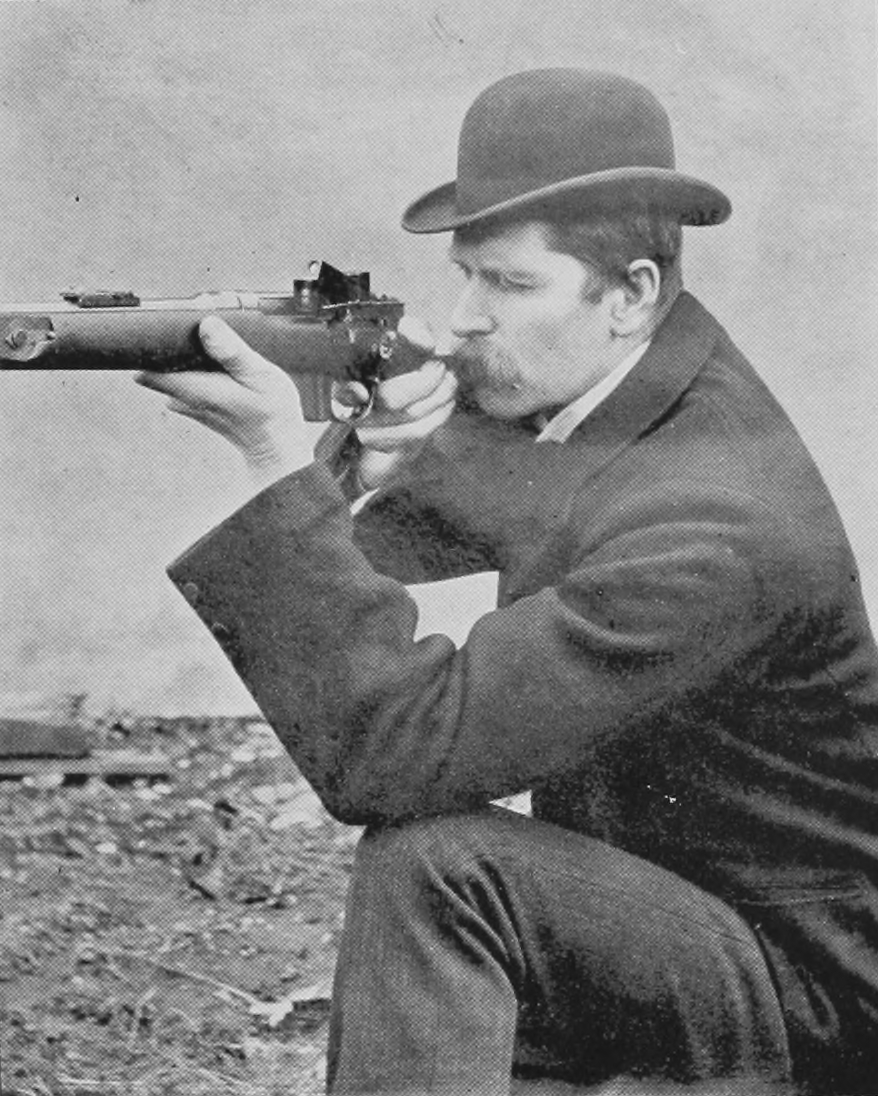
Sir Howard Grubb demonstrating an early model of his collimating reflector sight around 1901, mounted on the volley sight mount of a Lee-Metford

After the abandonment of volley sights, the rifles fitted with them remained in widespread service. The types with tall ladder sights generally kept them, but the British dial sights were removed when mass refurbishment schemes made this convenient. Many variants of the SMLE were produced, often with additional sights for target shooting. These were often mounted conveniently, using the original rear mounting screws of the volley sight, sometimes long after those volley sights had been withdrawn.
