= Operation Red Dagger =

2008 military operation in Afghanistan

Operation Sond Chara
- Part of the War in Afghanistan (2001–2021)
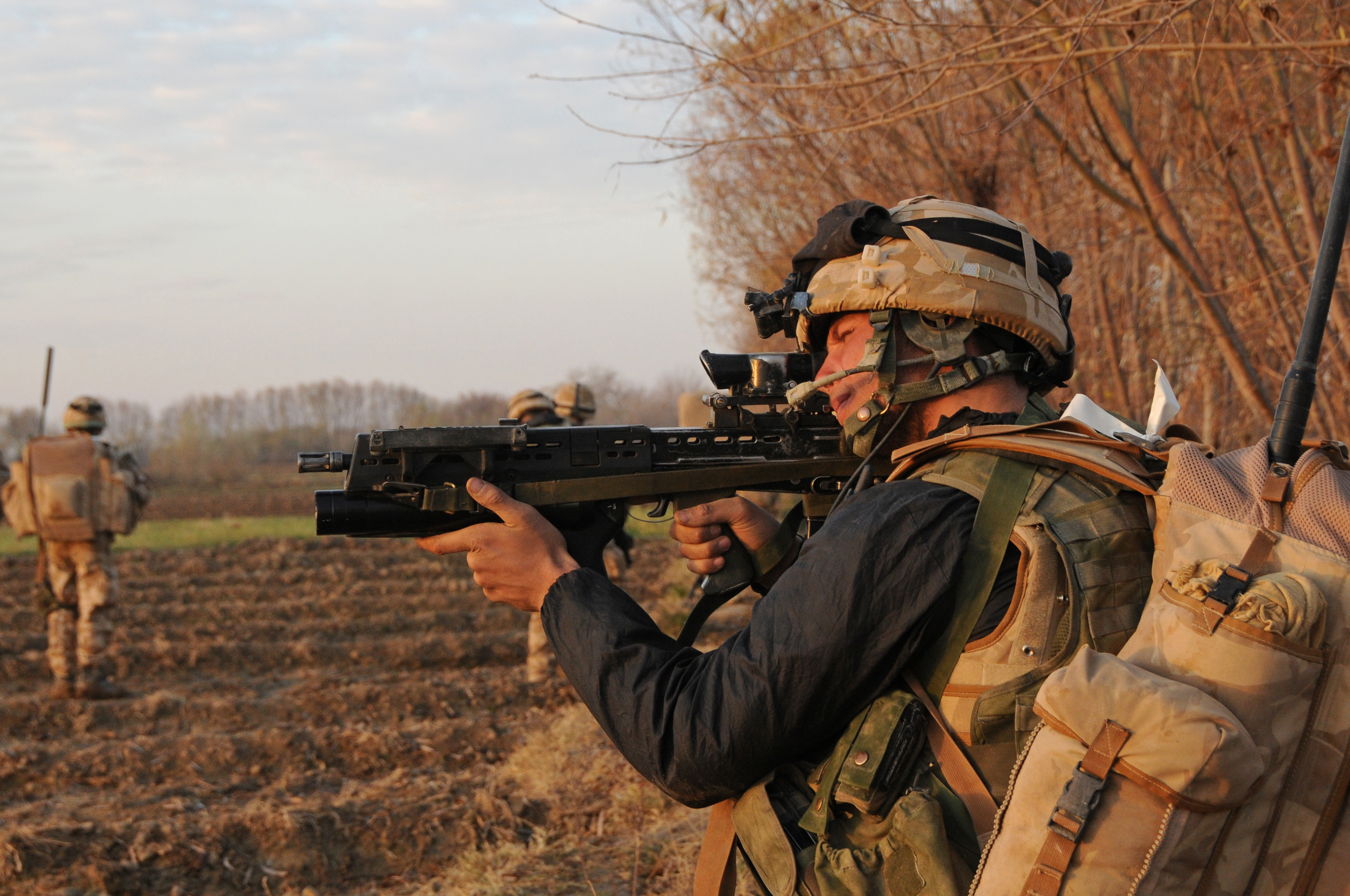
- Royal Marines during Operation Red Dagger
Date	11–26 December 2008
Location	Helmand Province, Afghanistan
Result	Coalition victory

Belligerents
United Kingdom; Islamic Republic of Afghanistan; Denmark; Estonia	(Afghanistan) Taliban

Commanders and leaders
(United Kingdom) Brigadier Gordon Messenger RM	Unknown

Strength
(United Kingdom) 1,500 (Denmark) 700 (Estonia) ~140 (total size of regiment deployed in Afghanistan)	500 insurgents with 10,000 reinforcements in Helmand province alone.

Casualties and losses
(United Kingdom) 5+ killed	Roughly 100 confirmed killed at minimum (+1 senior commander)

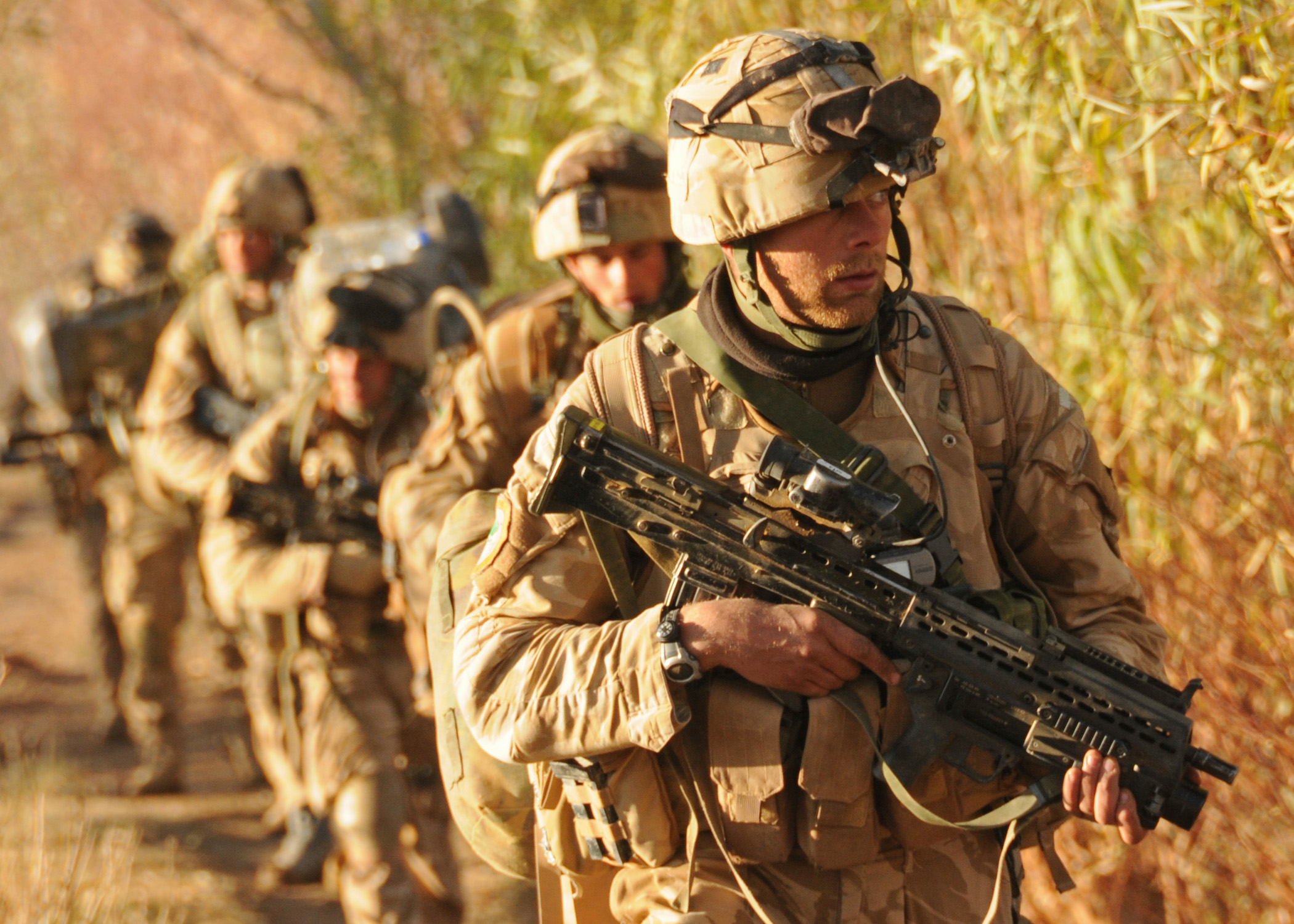
Royal Marines taking part in Operation Sond Chara. Photo Cpl. John Scott Rafoss USMC

Operation Sond Chara (Red Dagger in Pashto) was a campaign in the War in Afghanistan with aims and objectives centred on four Taliban strongholds near the town of Nad-e-Ali in Helmand Province, Afghanistan. The operation was named after the commando patch worn by members of 3 Commando Brigade Royal Marines. 1,500 British troops were involved, supported by Danish, Estonian and Afghan forces in the pre-Christmas offensive, commencing on 7 December 2008 with a night attack on Taliban defences in a village south of the operational area.

The offensive was intended to secure the area around the provincial capital of Lashkar Gah after an increase in insurgent attacks there (including a 300-man Taliban assault), as well as helping to safeguard a planned voter registration programme.

The hard-fought battles were against well-armed insurgents, who held fast and retaliated with 107mm rockets but eventually withdrew under a barrage of British mortar, tank, and missile fire. British troops were fighting knee-deep in mud during First World War-style trench battles. Some sections of the Marines fought while advancing over 60 km under fire and in poor conditions. CQB fighting was common, and some commanders reported fighting at ranges of 30 metres or less.

By its climax on 25 December 2008, 100 Taliban fighters, one reportedly a senior commander, were killed. By the end of the offensive five British soldiers, including an Australian serving with British forces, had been killed.

After a raid south of Lashkar Gah, £2 million worth of opium was found, alongside IEDs and other assorted drugs and explosives.

Brigadier Gordon Messenger, commander of Task Force Helmand, classes the campaign as "very successful".

In respect of the Muslim festival of Eid al-Adha, a two-day ceasefire starting on 8 December 2008 was upheld.

Recommencing operations on 11 December, 42 Commando Royal Marines attacked both from the ground and the air on Nad-e-Ali, securing an area which had been an insurgent stronghold. Commandos backed by the 2nd Battalion The Princesses of Wales's Royal Regiment and the Afghan National Army attacked and captured the town of Shin Kalay, west of Lashkar Gah. K Company (Black Knights) fought in the trenches surrounding the area, forcing the withdrawal of the insurgents. Royal Engineers found their efforts to build patrol bases hampered by heavy rain turning the ground into a sea of mud.

Lima Company, 42 Commando saw the most ferocious close-quarters fighting during the 360-degree battle for Zarghun Kalay, northwest of Lashkar Gah, on 17 December. They were supported by Juliet Company during the following days.

By the end of the operation the Marines of Lima Company Group had covered over 60 km on foot in the most arduous conditions. Involved in intense firefights by day, and 'yomping' (walking) by night, the Marines slept rough, eating wherever and whenever they could for 17 days.

== Troops involved ==
Recce Platoon 1st Battalion Princess of Wales's Royal Regiment 1PWRR

The following troops were involved in the operation

- 42 Commando Royal Marines
- C Company, 2 PWRR
- A Squadron and 1 Troop C Sqn QDG
- B Company, 1 RIFLES
- United Kingdom Land Forces Command Support Group (UKLF CSG)
- 29 Commando Regiment Royal Artillery
- 24 Commando Regiment Royal Engineers
- Armoured Support Group Royal Marines
- Viking Troop, The Queen's Royal Hussars
- Estonian Company (Including Mortar Troop)
- Danish Troops Jutland Dragoon Regiment

- B Company (Armoured Personnel Carriers)

- A troop (Leopard tanks, Medical Section)

- Royal Danish Engineers Regiment

- Combat Engineers Section

- 1st Battalion Royal Canadian Regiment (OMLT)
- Afghan National Security Forces

== See also ==
- British Forces casualties in Afghanistan since 2001
- Operation Herrick
- Maavägi#Operations
