= .402 Enfield =

Experimental British rifle cartridge

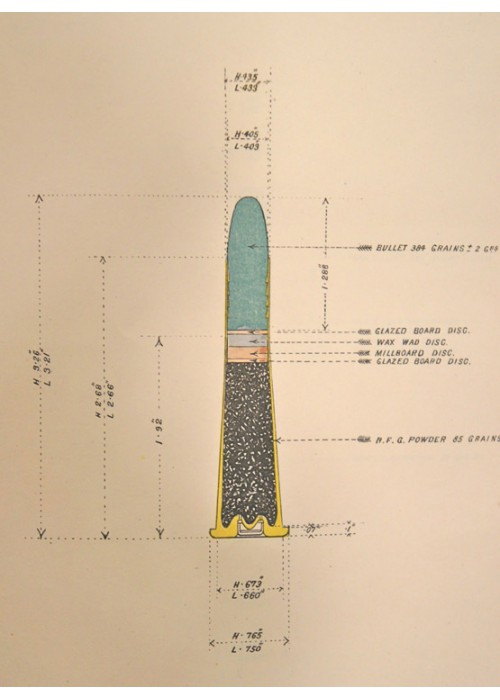
.402 Enfield drawing RL 4978m of 1885

The Enfield-Martini was a prototype British small-bore rifle of the 1880s. It used a new .402" Enfield cartridge. At the time 'small-bore' was considered to be anything smaller than the established .577 muskets and rifles.

The rifle was produced in two patterns, with some other prototype versions, and although over twenty thousand were made, it was not adopted and both rifle and cartridge were abandoned. Although both cartridge and rifle were abandoned and have left little trace of their existence, they represent an important phase in the development of British military small arms, even though the eventual conclusion was the Lee-Metford: a different calibre, bolt mechanism and magazine.

The Enfield-Martini predated the better-known Martini–Enfield (Note: Britain's main armoury for small arms was at the Royal Small Arms Factory, Enfield and so many innovations were known by that name.) by several years.

== Preceding rifles ==
The 1860s and 1870s were a time of great developments in military rifles. This saw the shift from muzzle to breech loading, the shift to smokeless powders, a shrinkage of calibres and beginning the introduction of repeating rifles with box magazines. The period began in Britain with the Pattern 1853 Enfield rifle-musket. This was a muzzle loading rifled musket of .577 calibre (Note: The preceding 'Brown Bess' musket had an even larger calibre of 0.75".) and firing a Boxer-Pritchett bullet of .550 diameter. (Note: As a muzzle loader, the ball was patched on loading, to tightly fit the bore. This explains the difference in diameters between ball and bore.)

From 1866, to provide a more modern breechloader at the lowest cost, the Snider–Enfield conversion of existing Pattern 1853 rifles was developed, now firing a brass-cased .577 Snider round through the same barrels.

By 1871, the Martini–Henry and its tilting-block lever action was using the .577/450 Martini–Henry. This had a reduced calibre of .45, although the cartridge's base was the same diameter as the Snider and the cartridge case was drawn down and bottlenecked. The Gatling gun was also entering service with its own .45 Gatling round.

A Royal Navy special committee was set up in 1879 to examine future options for small arms cartridges and to find a single cartridge to be used for all weapons, rifle and machine gun, for both Army and Navy service. The .45 Martini cartridge was not a popular candidate and its bottle shape was already known to be difficult both to manufacture and to feed reliably. Their initial recommendation was the adoption of the .45 Gatling cartridge for everything, and re-chambering the Martini-Henry to accept it. Trials were advertised in 1881 for gunsmiths and factories to demonstrate their wares in this calibre. By August, it was decided that the Martini would be chambered for the Gatling as the 'Mark IV Martini-Henry'.

However, only two months later, this decision was reversed. A new round was to be developed, with a load comparable to the Martini-Henry round, a calibre as small as practical, and a lighter bullet to match the same projectile energy as previously. The calibre chosen was to be around 0.4 in (10 mm).

== .402 Enfield ==
The 1879 Special Committee eventually recommended introducing yet another type of cartridge. At this time it would still be a blackpowder load and RSAF Enfield considered that the limits for blackpowder were a .38 cartridge as the smallest. In 1882 a new cartridge was produced, the .402 Enfield, with a load of 85 gr (5.5 g) of black powder. This was the same load as for the Martini-Henry, slightly more than the Snider. The load was based on the amount of felt recoil thought to be tolerable by a rifleman. 10,000 rounds of this cartridge to drawing RL 779 were obtained from the commercial gun trade and a rifle designed with which to evaluate them. The calibre was to be .402", firing a 380 gr (25 g) 12:1 lead / tin alloy bullet. The cases were Berdan primed.

The first designs used a tapered case; several known drawings of this included RL 779 RL 4978m, RL 4979, and RL 4981. These maintained all the same basic details, but with a varying diameter for the rimmed cartridge head. As the case angle stayed constant, there was also a slight change in the length of the case. The bullet and load remained the same.

Work on the cartridge did not progress quickly and it took until 1885 for further designs to be produced. The only major change was to change the cartridge from a tapered case to a parallel-sided bottlenecked case in drawing RL 5072, as this was easier to produce, even though it required the rechambering of all the arms using it. A mass-produced trials rifle, the Pattern A, was produced for the bottle-necked cartridge.

Soon afterwards, by 1886, the Martini-Henry action chosen for the trials rifle was being overtaken by new developments in bolt-action rifles and magazine-fed repeating rifles. Although the .402 Enfield was also used for trials with these new actions, newer rounds such as the Swiss Schmidt–Rubin rifle showed that developments in ammunition had already moved on. Smokeless powders and jacketed bullets provided better performance, and could do so in an even smaller calibre. The .402" Enfield was now obsolete before it had ever been used in service.

Some use had to be found for the now fully developed .402 round, and the stocks of ammunition already made, and so it was approved as a machine gun cartridge for use in Gardner and Nordenfelt manually-worked repeating machine guns. By 1898 though it was declared obsolete.

A few specific models of the round in the post-trials period are recorded:

=== Ball Mark I ===
'Cartridge Machine Gun Ball .4 inch Mark I' as drawing RL 5368 in September 1887. Headstamped as 'R↑L 87'. The bullet was a 384 gr (24.9 g) round-nosed unjacketed lead bullet of an alloy of 56:1:1 parts lead:tin:antimony. There was no cannelure and it had a white paper patch contained entirely within the case. The propellant was about 85 grains of RFG2 (Note: RFG2: 'Rifle, Fine, Grade 2') blackpowder surmounted by two cloth wads with a beeswax wad between them. Muzzle velocity was about 1,570 ft/s (480 m/s).

=== Blank Mark I & Mark II ===
'Cartridge Machine Gun Blank .4 inch Mark I' was approved in August 1887. The case was as for the ball round but copper-washed to identify them. A mock bullet was fitted made of brown paper covered in blue paper with a white tip. The charge was the same as the Ball round, 85 grains of RFG2 blackpowder. Mark II blanks have also been found since, with a headstamp of 'R↑L II'.

=== Dummy Steel Mark I ===
An armourer's dummy cartridge as 'Cartridge Machine Gun Dummy Special for Armourers (Steel) .4 inch Mark I' was approved in April 1891. This was a turned steel cartridge to the profile of the Ball Mark I. To make the weight match that of the Ball Mark I cartridge, the centre was bored out and filled with wood. The base had a steel plug held by a rubber ring, to permit dry firing. The base was stamped with an 'X' for identification and they were personally issued to armourers in sets of three.

== Firearms in this calibre ==
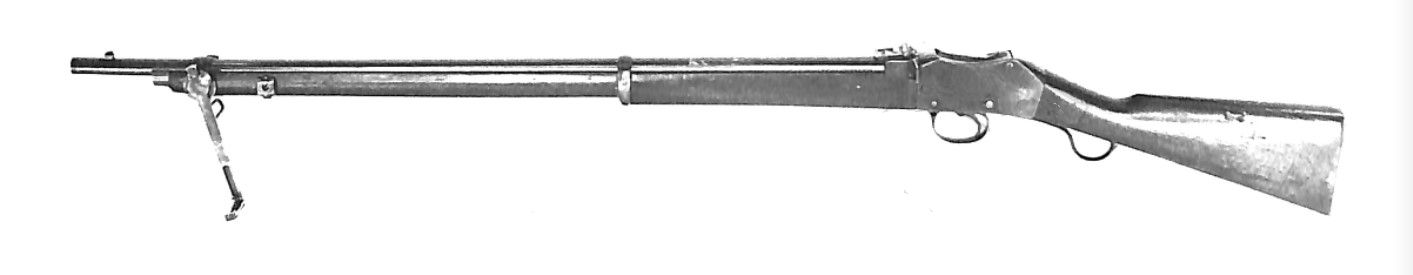
Enfield-Martini, Experimental, 1882 The volley fore sight is hinged down

Only a handful of experimental firearms were ever chambered in this calibre. Two are rare, the other four almost unknown. Half were variants of the Martini-Henry Mark III action. The Martini-Henry was chosen partly because it was the obvious military long arm of the period to compare against, but also because the Martini action is mounted entirely behind the breech face, thus making it easy to convert and rechamber or rebarrel.

Despite, or because of, the rarity of these pieces there is little accurate documentation of them. Many web sites refer to them, but frequently mis-identify what they're referring to, or confuse different models. (Note: The even rarer rifle illustrated as a 'Lee Burton Enfield Martini .402" Rifle Pattern A' or a 'Lee Burton Magazine Rifle' is really Bethel Burton's 'Magazine Gun' of 1900, with a side-mounted box magazine, Burton's interrupted screwthread bolt, and a flag safety on the rear of the bolt. It has no connection to Lee, or to the .402 Enfield.)

=== Rifle, Enfield-Martini, .4", Experimental ===
Overall length	49.5 in (1,260 mm),
barrel length	33.2 in (840 mm),
weight	9 lb 2 oz (4.1 kg)
Rifling	9 groove

This was produced in 1882, as a first response to the 1881 Committee on Small Arms and their proposed new cartridge. It uses a modified Martini-Henry with a new barrel and 9-groove rifling. Overall length 49.5 in (1,260 mm), barrel length 33.2 in (840 mm), weight 9 lb 2 oz (4.1 kg). This was the only firearm chambered for the original tapered case designs of the .402 round.

Recognising the extreme range that was now possible with this round, this weapon is also notable as the first to be fitted with a deliberate and separate volley sight for volley fire at long ranges. The backsight has two leaves, the regular one graduated for up to 1,000 yards and a new leaf folding out to the left side with a V notch. A further 5¾" long bar near the fore sight can be swung down to below the main sight, allowing sighting out to 2,100 yards.

This piece is extremely rare and the number produced is unknown, perhaps 50 along with 10,000 rounds of ammunition, as they were used for testing rather than massed trials with infantry. An example survives in the Royal Armouries (Note: Originally the pattern room collection of the Enfield armoury, now relocated to Leeds.) pattern room collection.

=== Rifle, Enfield-Martini, .4", 1st Pattern (Pattern A) ===
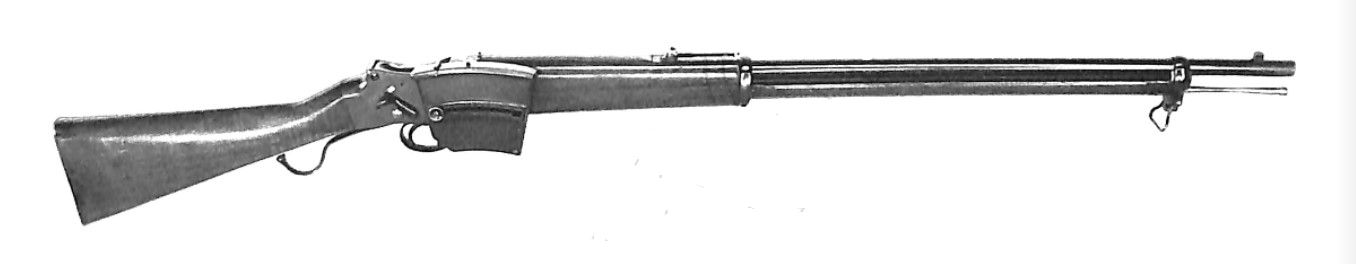
Enfield-Martini 1st or Pattern A, 1886

Overall length	49.5 in (1,260 mm),
barrel length	33.2 in (840 mm),
weight	9 lb 12 oz (4.4 kg)
Rifling	Seven groove reverse ratchet one twist in 15 inches

Over four years of testing, several changes were made, some to the cartridge but also by 1884 the nine groove rifling was replaced with seven groove reverse ratchet rifling, one twist in 15 inches, and with the tips of the ratchet radiussed over to prevent leading. The new pattern was authorised for production as the 'Rifle, Enfield-Martini, .4"' on 17 April 1886. It was provisionally approved for troop trials and so 1,000 were authorised. Despite the previous model having been tested for five years with little outward effect, there was now a rush to develop a new service rifle and have it in service. Mass production was authorised while the rifle was still in trials, leading to 21,372 of them being produced, then suddenly halted for major changes owing to their reception in the field having been so poor.

The rifle had a number of changes from the first experimental model. The first was that the cartridge had changed and the original tapered case designs had now been replaced by a straight-sided bottlenecked cartridge. There were also changes to the design of the weapon, mostly the ideas of Colonel Henry Thomas Arbuthnot (1834–1919), then Superintendent of the Enfield armoury and a member of the Committee on Small Arms which had instigated the .402 Enfield project.

Most obvious of these was a 6 (Note: Some sources claim 8 rounds.) shot box-like quickloader on the right-hand side of the action. This held a number of rounds vertically, bullet downwards, and one at a time could be removed conveniently for loading. The box was easily removable and one or more could be carried separately in the soldier's pack, under cover.

Less obvious was the addition of the first safety catch on the Martini-Henry. A long-standing complaint about the existing Martini-Henry was that as the action cocked on opening, there was no way to carry it safely with it loaded, yet uncocked. The prominent teardrop-shaped lever on the right side of the action is a cocking indicator, not a control for a safety device. Adding a safety catch allowed it to be safe to carry whilst cocked and loaded, making it much quicker to bring into action if surprised on patrol. Similar safety catches appeared on later Martini-Henrys. Also there were a number of constructional differences: the barrel was now semi-floating, (Note: The concept of floating barrels for accuracy does not appear to have been recognised as yet, despite this being an era when increased accuracy was being sought for infantry small arms. The intention seems to have been to provide better barrel cooling during rapid fire, also to avoid trapping rainwater between barrel and stock.) rather than bedded in the fore-end of the stock and it was only mounted to the stock at the barrel band and the Nock's form. (Note: The 'Nock's form' or 'nocksform', named after Nock the gunsmith, is a flat machined on the barrel, adjacent to where it screws into the receiver. It acts both as a location for a barrel wrench, also as a datum surface on which to align the sights.)

Two separate backsights were fitted, an adjustable ladder sight calibrated to 2,000 yards on the stock and a battle sight close to the breech, with a fixed notch for 100 yards and a fold-up leaf for 300 yards. (Note: This battle sight was described as a 'buckhorn' sight, owing to the curved shape of the V notch. However this was not the same as the later, typically American, buckhorn sights where the space between the 'horns' is hollow, giving a single sight picture with two aiming marks visible at once (between the 'horns' and above the 'skull'), so avoiding the need to fold up any leaves.)

As the rifle was now intended for military field trials, not just ballistic tests, it was fitted with a new 18½" sword bayonet, the first British bayonet that fitted underneath the barrel band of the stock and around the muzzle.

=== Rifle, Enfield-Martini, .4", 2nd Pattern (Pattern B) ===
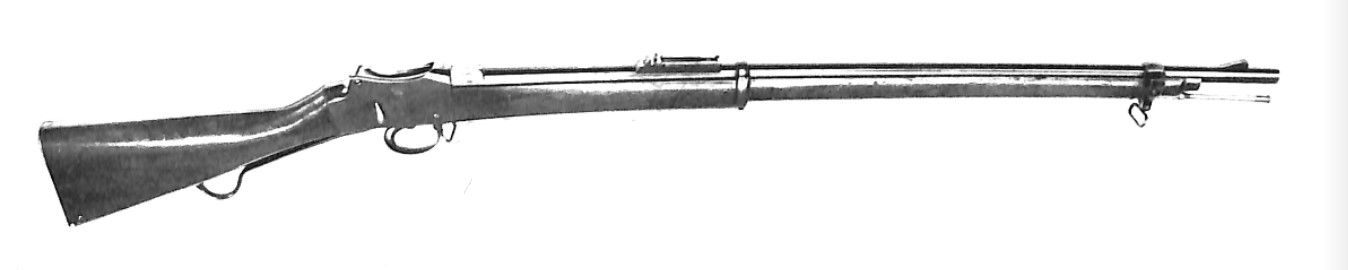
Enfield-Martini 2nd or Pattern B, 1887

Overall length	49.5 in (1,260 mm),
barrel length	33.2 in (840 mm),
weight	9 lb 9 oz (4.3 kg)
Rifling	Seven groove reverse ratchet

Field trials of the Pattern A rifle were disappointing and there was a rapid move to redesign it. On 13 May 1887 a new version was approved for trials. The cartridge and rifling remained the same, but most of the Arbuthnot features were reverted to the typical Martini-Henry style.

Experience with the Martini-Henry in Sudan had shown extraction problems, so a longer operating lever was fitted to give a more powerful action. The sights were more conventional with a rear ladder calibrated to 2,000 yards and a barleycorn foresight. The bayonet fitting was replaced by one on the right side of the barrel band.

After the .402 round was abandoned in favour of the .303 round, these rifles were surplus. They were converted to .577/450 calibre as Martini-Henry Mark IVC.

=== Owen Jones ===
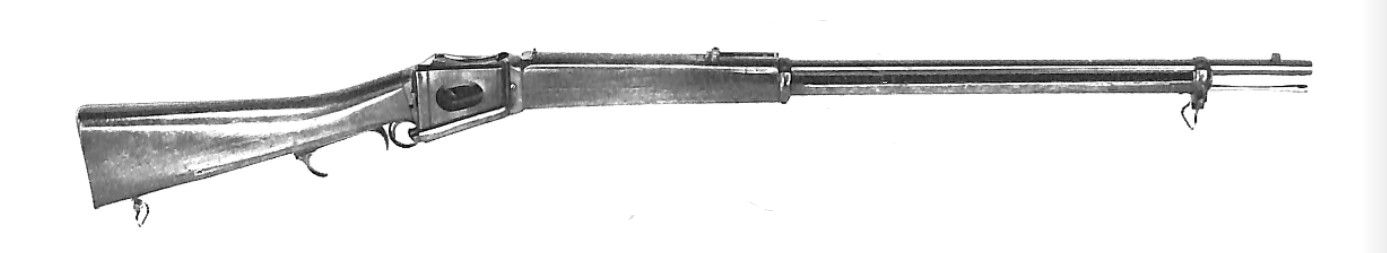
Owen Jones, 1886

Overall length	51.5 in (1,310 mm),
barrel length	33.2 in (840 mm),
weight	10 lb 7 oz (4.7 kg)
Rifling	Seven groove ratchet

This was one of several rifles produced to Owen Jones' designs in various calibres, mostly at the instigation of the Royal Navy, in the search for a reliable magazine loading system. It was his system's only involvement with the .402 Enfield round.

By 1885, magazine rifles of many systems had been tested and for .45 calibre the Owen Jones design was considered to be the best, with the Lee in second place. In 1886, small bore rifles were tested at HMS Excellent with both the Owen Jones and the Lee systems. As a result, the Owen Jones was then eliminated, Lee's future success in British rifles being well known.

This weapon was largely a Pattern A Enfield-Martini, with the action and feed system incorporating the Owen Jones features. The handguard, Arbuthnot-style fore-end, sights and bayonet were all Enfield-Martini pattern. The barrel was taken from the same production lots, with the same length and rifling.

The Owen Jones hopper magazine was mounted on the right side of the receiver. It slid up and down, this acting as a magazine cut-off, rather than as his earlier designs where the magazine was fixed and the cut-off a separate device.

=== Enfield Lee ===
Overall length	50.2 in (1,280 mm),
barrel length	31.2 in (790 mm),
weight	10 lb 2 oz (4.6 kg)
Rifling	Seven groove ratchet

The Enfield Lee, one of several prototype rifles known as 'Improved Lee' patterns, was made by Enfield in 1886 as part of the trials to establish the best design of magazine for a repeating rifle with the Lee bolt. Most of its features were similar to the .45 Gatling calibre Improved Lee of 1886, but with some parts from the Pattern B Enfield-Martini to support the .402 cartridge. Because the Lee bolt action was longer than the Martini-Henry, the barrel fore-end was shortened slightly.

=== Lee-Burton ===
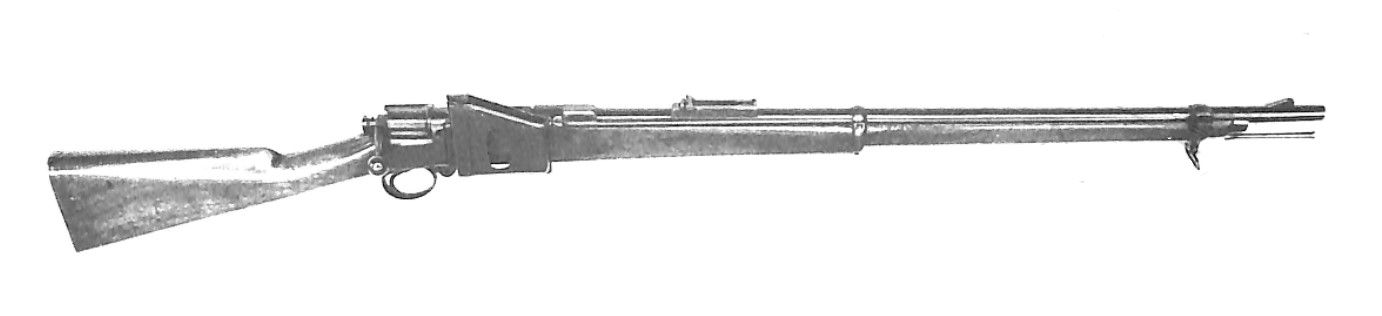
Lee-Burton, 1887

Overall length	50.2 in (1,280 mm),
barrel length	30.3 in (770 mm),
weight	10 lb (4.5 kg)
Rifling	Seven groove ratchet

In 1887 another, and the last, extremely rare rifle was made in .402 Enfield. This was the Lee-Burton rifle, a design combining the bolt-action designed by prolific rifle inventor James Paris Lee and the side-mounted hopper magazine of Bethel Burton. It was produced from January 1887 for trials to be held in May of that year, to directly compare rifles with the Lee bolt and magazines of either Lee's box underneath, or Burton's side hopper. The overall design, and this combination, was one of 300 produced by Enfield. They were the same as the Enfield Lee in most aspects, except for the magazine. A similar number were produced with the Lee box magazine by Remington as the Remington-Lee, although these were chambered in 11mm, .433 Spanish, as Lee's prototype had been.

These trials were the final ones before the combination of the Lee bolt and Lee box magazine were adopted for future British rifles, setting the stage (although far from immediately!) for the Lee-Enfield.

The piece is extremely rare and one is preserved 'in the white' (Note: Unfinished, as machined and fitted, and without any protective bluing or russetting applied to the metalwork.) in the Royal Armouries collection. This weapon is so rare that most online descriptions of it have confused it with the Enfield-Martini Pattern A. As one of these is marked 'Enfield 1886', this may be a confusion with the earlier Pattern A, or even a weapon that was converted from a Pattern A.

== .303 ==
At the end of the 1880s, the Swiss Schmidt–Rubin rifle appeared. This used the two innovations of smokeless powder and jacketed bullets. Immediately the goals of the .402 Enfield were validated whilst its actuality was obsoleted. The .402 had been chosen as the smallest practical calibre for a black powder small bore rifle cartridge. The new powders could achieve similar energy in a smaller case volume and the jacketed bullets could handle the higher muzzle velocities to keep the same energies with a smaller, lighter bullet. The optimum size for a military round was now around 3/4 of the diameter it had been and the ideal calibre shifted from .4" to around .3".

For once, the Small Arms Committee responded quickly and competently. It was instructed in January 1887 to extend its research and re-examine the correct rifle and cartridge for the future and its reaction was to put the Lee-Metford into production by 1888, including its new round the .303 British. The adoption of the .303 Lee-Metford was not universally welcomed. Edward Marjoribanks MP for Berwickshire spoke at length in 1891 against it, claiming problems with many of its components particularly the bolt, preferring the .402 cartridge and an unjacketed lead bullet over the .303, and the tilting block of the Martini-Henry over bolts. He remained unconvinced of the basic virtue of a magazine at all.

The .402" Enfield was declared obsolete in 1898.
