= Martini–Henry =

British lever action rifle

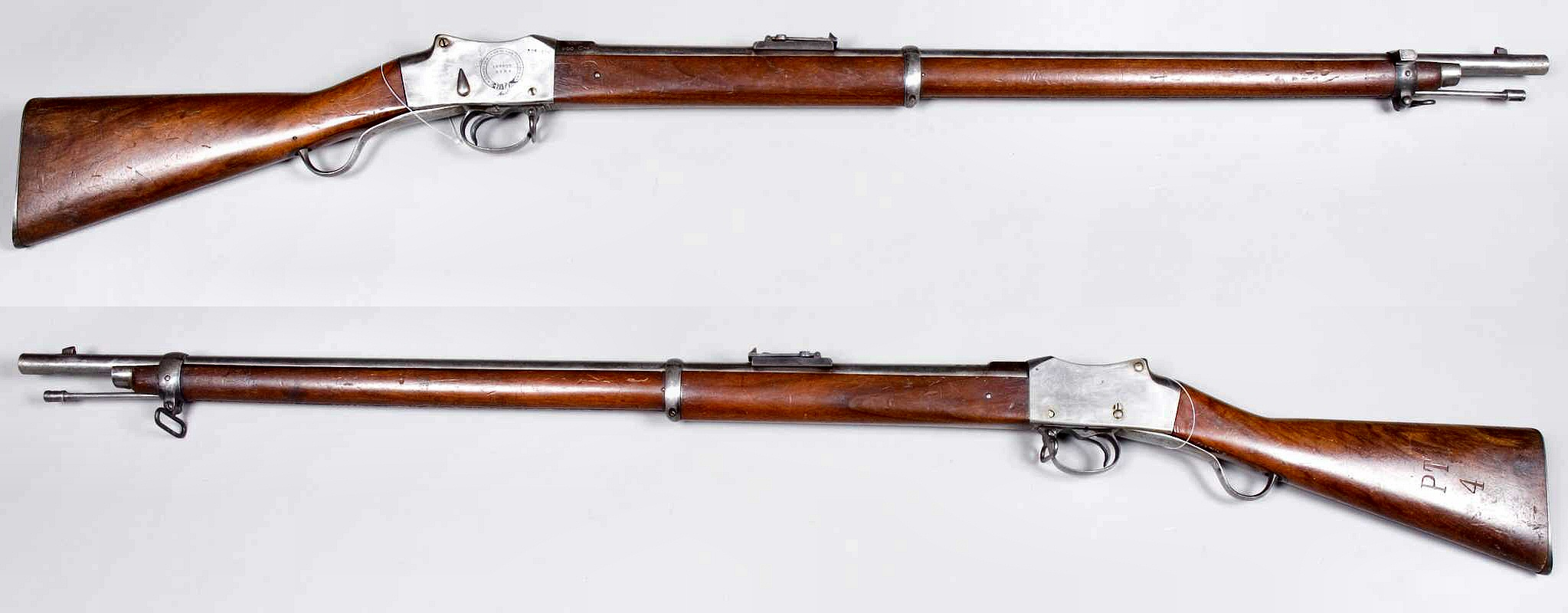
- A Martini–Henry in the collections of the Swedish Army Museum
- Type: Service rifle Shotgun (Greener Prison Variant)
- Place of origin: United Kingdom

Service history
- In service: 1871–1918
- Used by: See Users
- Wars: British colonial wars Perak War; Second Anglo-Afghan War; Argentine Civil Wars; Shizoku anti-revolutionary Herzegovina Uprising (1875–1878); Russo-Turkish War; War of the Pacific; Anglo-Zulu War; First Boer War; First Italo-Ethiopian War; North-West Rebellion; Greco-Turkish War (1897); Portuguese conquest of the Gaza Empire; Second Boer War; Balkan Wars; World War I Greco-Turkish War (1919–22); The Troubles; Nepalese Civil War; War in Afghanistan (1978–present) (limited)

Production history
- Designer: Friedrich von Martini
- Designed: 1870
- Manufacturer: Various
- Unit cost: ~£2/2/–=£2.10 (late 1880s)
- Produced: 1871–1889
- No. built: approx. 500,000–1,000,000
- Variants: Martini–Henry Carbine; Greener Prison Shotgun; Gahendra rifle

Specifications
- Mass: 8 pounds 7 ounces (3.83 kg) (unloaded), 9 pounds 4.75 ounces (4.22 kg) (with sword bayonet)
- Length: 49 inches (1,245 mm)
- Barrel length: 33.22 inches (844 mm)
- Cartridge: .577/450 Boxer-Henry.577/450 Martini–Henry.303 British; 11.43×55R (Ottoman); 11.43×59R (Romanian); 7.65×53 (Ottoman)
- Action: Martini Falling Block
- Rate of fire: 12 rounds/minute
- Muzzle velocity: 1,300 ft/s (400 m/s)
- Effective firing range: 400 yd (370 m)
- Maximum firing range: 1,900 yd (1,700 m)
- Feed system: Single-shot
- Sights: Sliding ramp rear sights, fixed-post front sights

The Martini–Henry is a breech-loading single-shot rifle with a lever action that was used by the British Army. It first entered service in 1871, eventually replacing the Snider–Enfield, a muzzle-loader converted to the cartridge system. Martini–Henry variants were used throughout the British Empire for 47 years. It combined the dropping-block action first developed by Henry O. Peabody (in his Peabody rifle) and improved by the Swiss designer Friedrich von Martini, combined with the polygonal rifling designed by Scotsman Alexander Henry.

Though the Snider was the first breechloader firing a metallic cartridge in regular British service, the Martini was designed from the outset as a breechloader and was both faster firing and had a longer range.

The Martini–Henry was copied on a large scale by North-West Frontier Province gunsmiths. Their weapons were of a poorer quality than those made by Royal Small Arms Factory, Enfield, but accurately copied down to the proof markings. The chief manufacturers were the Adam Khel Afridi, who lived around the Khyber Pass. The British called such weapons "Pass-made rifles".

== Overview ==
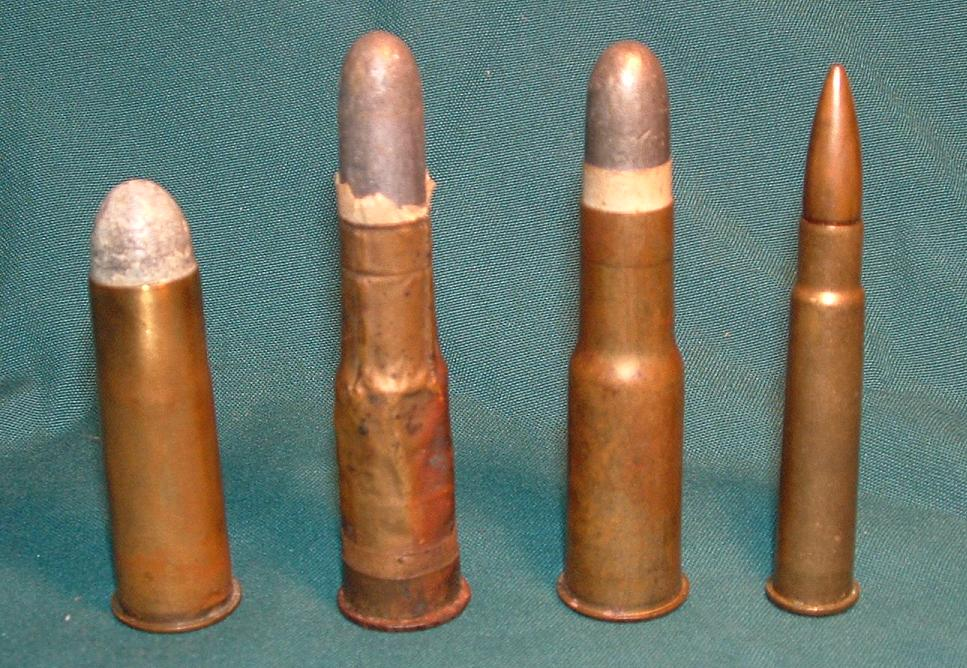
(From left to right): A .577 Snider cartridge, a Zulu War–era rolled brass foil .577/450 Martini–Henry Cartridge, a later drawn brass .577/450 Martini–Henry cartridge, and a .303 British Mk VII SAA Ball cartridge

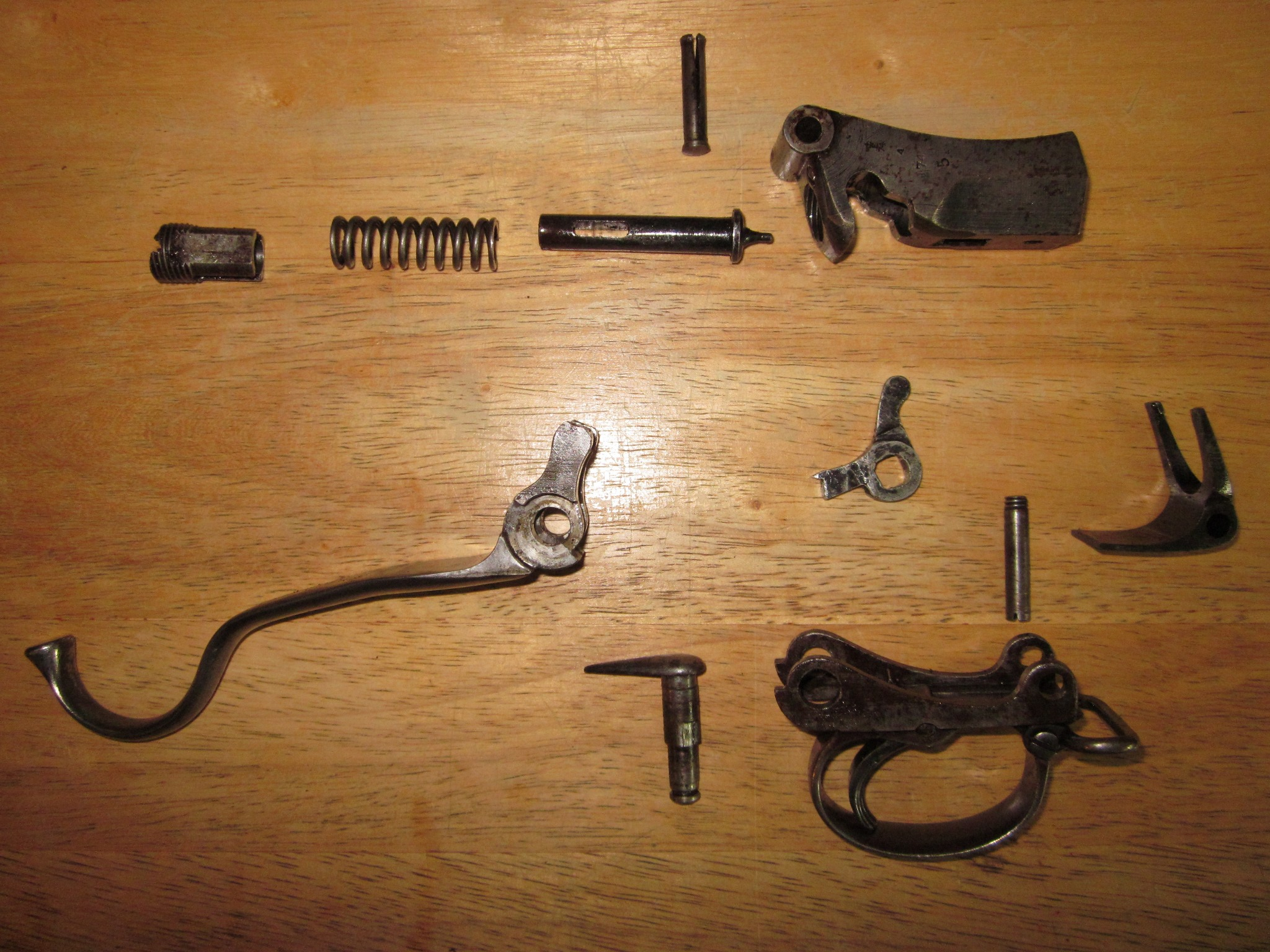
The disassembled Martini–Henry action.

== Ammunition ==
In the original chambering, the rifles fired a round-nosed, tapered-head .452-inch, soft hollow-based lead bullet, wrapped in a paper patch giving a wider diameter of .460 to .469-inch; it weighed 485 grains. It was crimped in place with two cannelures (grooves on the outside neck of the case), ahead of two fibre card or mill board disks, a concave beeswax wad, another card disk and cotton wool filler. This sat on top of the main powder charge inside, initially a rimmed brass foil cartridge, later made in drawn brass.

The cartridge case was paper lined so as to prevent the chemical reaction between the black powder and the brass. Known today as the .577/450, a bottle-neck design with the same base as the .577 cartridge of the Snider–Enfield. It was charged with 85 grains (5.51 g) of Curtis and Harvey's No.6 coarse black powder, notorious for its heavy recoil. The cartridge case was ejected to the rear when the lever was operated.

== Rifle design and dimensions ==
The rifle was 49 inches (1,245 mm) long, the steel barrel 33.22 inches (844 mm). The Henry patent rifling produced a heptagonal barrel with seven grooves with one turn in 22 inches (559 mm). The weapon weighed 8 pounds 7 ounces (3.83 kg). A sword bayonet was standard issue for non-commissioned officers; when fitted, the weapon extended to 68 inches (1,727 mm) and weight increased to 10 pounds 4 ounces (4.65 kg).

The standard bayonet was a socket-type spike, either converted from the older Pattern 1853 (overall length 20.4 inches (518 mm)) or newly produced as the Pattern 1876 (overall length 25 inches (635 mm)), referred to as the "lunger". A bayonet designed by Lord Elcho was intended for chopping and other sundry non-combat duties, and featured a double row of teeth so it could be used as a saw; it was not produced in great numbers and was not standard issue.

=== Sights, accuracy, and performance ===
The Mk II Martini–Henry rifle, the most numerous modification adopted in 1877, as used in the Zulu Wars, was sighted to 1,800 yards (1,600 m). At 1,200 yards (1,100 m), 20 shots exhibited a mean deflection from the centre of the group of 27 inches (69 cm), the highest point on the trajectory was 8 feet (2.44 m) at 500 yards (460 m). In 1879, Mk III rifle was adopted, which had minor design updates as well as more interchangeable parts with Martini-Henry carbine.

=== Ammunition development and replacements ===
In late 1870s British military was looking forward to unify ammunition for its rifles and machine guns (they were both .45 caliber, but different cartridges). The .577/.450 turned out to be poorly suited to the hopper feed as well as existing box magazines due to a very pronounced bottleneck, so in 1881 the Gatling cartridge was tried in Martini-Henry rifles.

However, in parallel developing a new cartridge with a lighter approximately .4 inch bullet was considered since 1880, and after its design was settled on in 1885 a new variant of the rifle for it was approved in April 1886, designated Enfield-Martini .4-inch Pattern A.

It incorporated several minor improvements such as a safety catch, was gradually phased in to replace the Martini–Henry with over 21000 produced overall. The replacement was planned to be gradual, to use up existing stocks of the old ammunition. A year later a modified Pattern B was approved with tens of thousands more produced.

However, before this was complete, the decision was made to replace the Martini–Henry rifles with the .303 calibre bolt-action magazine Lee–Metford, which gave a considerably higher maximum rate of fire. Consequently, to avoid having three different rifle calibres in service, the Enfield–Martinis were withdrawn, converted to 0.45 calibre, and renamed Martini–Henry Mk IV "A", "B" and "C" pattern rifles. Some 0.303 calibre black-powder carbine versions were also produced, known as the Martini–Metford, and even 0.303 calibre cordite carbines, called Martini–Enfields (the former name for the type of action and the latter name for the pattern of rifling).

=== Service use ===
During the Martini–Henry's service life the British Army was involved in a large number of colonial wars, most notably the Anglo-Zulu War in 1879. The rifle was used in the Battle of Isandlwana, and by the company of the 2nd Battalion, 24th Regiment of Foot at the battle of Rorke's Drift, where 139 British soldiers successfully defended themselves against several thousand Zulus. The weapon was not completely phased out until 1904.

==== Variants ====
The Martini-Henry carbine represented a more compact and lightweight iteration of the distinguished British Martini-Henry rifle, specifically engineered for personnel training. This design prioritized reduced weight and recoil while maintaining the inherent single-shot, falling-block action.

Artillery carbines used a lighter .577/450 cartridge load, typically a 410-grain projectile instead of the 480-grain infantry bullet, reducing recoil for rapid handling.

Carbine-specific cavalry design features included a shortened barrel, an abbreviated ladder-style rear sight graduated to about 1,000 yards, and a reduced-power loading firing a 410-grain bullet of the .577/450 caliber, which was lighter than the standard rifle load, lessening recoil and making repeated firing more manageable. Some models were issued with specialized sword bayonets, such as the Yataghan-style, allowing cavalrymen to use their firearms in close combat.

=== Later ammunition and civilian use ===
The nitro based/shotgun powders were used in Kynoch's .577/450 drawn-brass Martini–Henry cartridge cases well into the 1960s for the commercial market, and again were found to be very reliable and, being smokeless, eliminated fouling issues. The powder's burning with less pressure inside the cartridge case prevented the brass cases from sticking inside the rifle's chamber (because they were not expanding as much as the original black-powder loads did).

== Competitive shooting ==
The rifle remained a popular competition rifle at National Rifle Association meetings, at Bisley, Surrey, and (NRA) Civilian and Service Rifle matches from 1872 to 1904, where it was used up to 1,000 yards using the standard military service ammunition of the day. By the 1880s the .577/.450 Boxer Henry round was recognised by the NRA as a 900-yard cartridge, as shooting the Martini out to 1,000 yards (3/4 of a mile) was difficult. It took great skill to assess the correct amount of elevation and windage to drop the 485 grain bullet on target at that range. But by 1904 more target shooters were using the new .303 cal. cartridge, which was found to be much more accurate, and thus interest in the .577/450 fell away, to the point that by 1909 they were rarely used at Bisley matches, with shooters favouring the later Lee–Enfield bolt action magazine rifles.

=== Ballistics and battlefield effectiveness ===
In 1879, however, it was generally found that in average hands the .577/450 Martini–Henry Mk2, although the most accurate of the Martinis in that calibre ever produced for service life, was really only capable of hitting a man-size target out to 400 yards. This was due to the bullet going subsonic after 300 yards and gradually losing speed thereafter, which in turn affected consistency and accuracy of the bullet in flight.

The 415-grain Martini Carbine load introduced in 1878 shot better out to longer ranges and had less recoil when it was fired in the rifles, with its reduced charge of only 75 grains of Curtis & Harvey's. It was found that, while the rifle with its 485 grain bullet shot point of aim to 100 yards, the carbine load when fired in the rifles shot 12 inches (30 cm) high at the same range, but then made up for this by shooting spot-on out to 500 yards (460 m).

These early lessons enabled tactics to be evolved to work around the limitations of this large, slow, and heavy calibre during the Zulu War. During most of the key battles, such as Rorke's Drift and the Battle of Ulundi, the order to volley fire was not given until the Zulus were at or within 400 yards.

The ballistic performance of a .577/450 is somewhat similar to that of an American .45/70 Government round, as used prolifically throughout the American Frontier West and by buffalo hunters, though the .577/450 has more power due to its extra 15 grains of black powder inside the cartridge case. It is clear from early medical field surgeons' reports that at 200 yards the rifle really came into its own, and inflicted devastating wounds on the Zulus in the Anglo–Zulu War. The MK2 Martini's sights are marked to 1,800 yards, but this setting was only ever used for long-range mass volley firing to harass an artillery position or a known massed cavalry position, prior to a main fight, and to prevent or delay infantry attacks.

A similar "drop volley sight" whereby the rifle's bullets were dropped long range onto the target was employed on the later .303 Lee–Enfield rifles of WW1, which had a graduation lever sight calibrated up to 2,800 yards.

=== Foreign production and variants ===
The Nepalese produced a close copy of the British Martini–Henry incorporating certain Westley Richards improvements to the trigger mechanism but otherwise very similar to the British Mark II. These rifles can be identified by their Nepalese markings and different receiver ring. A noticeably different variant incorporating earlier Westley Richards ideas for a flat-spring driven hammer within the receiver in lieu of the coil-spring powered striker of the von Martini design, known as the Gahendra rifle, was produced locally in Nepal.

While generally well-made, the rifles were produced substantially by hand, making the quality extremely variable. Though efforts were being made to phase out these rifles, presumably by the 1890s, some 9000 were still in service in 1906.

=== Later service ===
The Martini–Henry saw service in World War I in a variety of roles, primarily as a Reserve Arm, but it was also issued (in the early stages of the war) to aircrew for attacking observation balloons with newly developed incendiary ammunition, and aircraft. Martini–Henrys were also used in the African and Middle Eastern theatres during World War I, in the hands of Native Auxiliary troops.

=== Greener shotgun ===
A shotgun variant known as the Greener Police Gun, Greener EG (for "Egyptian Government"), or the Greener Prison Shotgun was chambered in a 14.5-gauge 2 7/8-inch (18×73mm) full-length brass shell used only by this gun. That would make the weapon useless to anyone who stole it, as no other cartridge could be loaded. It was used by prison guards and police in Egypt, Burma, India, and Australia. Over 60,000 had been produced by the time production ended in the 1960s.

The gun was originally designed to replace the Egyptian police's obsolete Martini–Henry rifles, which they usually loaded with brass shotshells. The Mark I/14 ("14" for the gun's gauge), first produced in 1918, had a full wooden stock and a large metal nosecap over the muzzle. The Mark II/14 lacked the nosecap and had a full hunting-style stock. It was discovered that criminals in Egypt were jury-rigging shotguns they had captured or stolen by wrapping common civilian 16-gauge shells with thick paper to allow them to fit the bore.

Greener responded in 1932 by coming up with a redesigned gun and new shell design to prevent this. The Mark III/14 Shotgun had a three-pronged firing pin and its cartridge had a unique recessed primer well (much like that of the Lebel rifle) to prevent the firing of standard shells. The cartridge also had a bottle-necked tapered wall and corresponding shotgun breech that would prevent the insertion of other shells. In addition to the cocking indicators found on military Martini-Henry rifles, the Police Gun features a safety lever that automatically engages when cocked.

An example can be seen at the Royal Armouries Museum in Leeds.

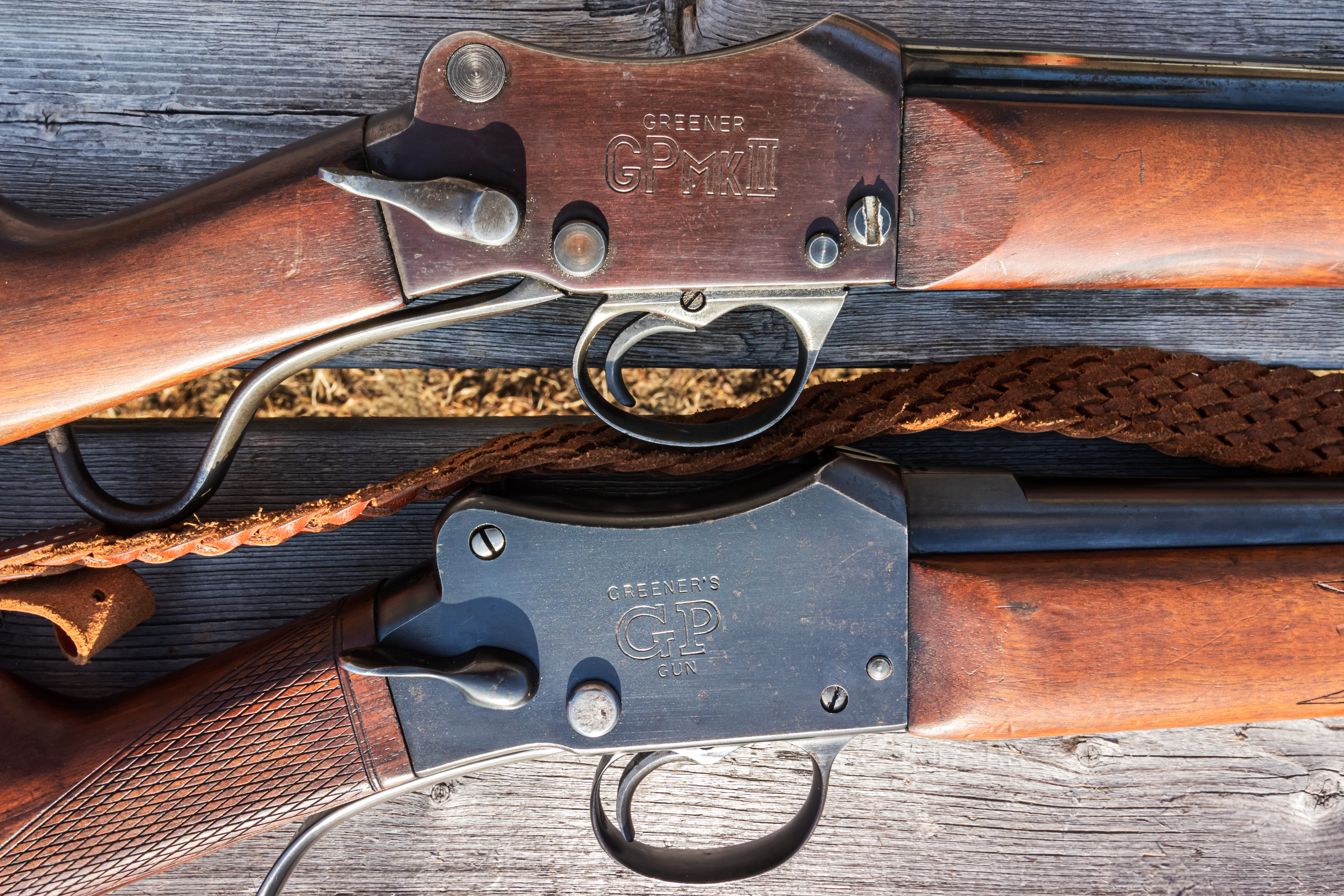
A Greener GP Mark I and Mark II, note the difference in finish, safety lever, and takedown screw.

Greener also used the Martini action for the GP ("General Purpose") single-barreled shotgun firing standard 12-bore 2 1/2 or 2 3/4-inch ammunition, which was a staple for gamekeepers and rough shooters in Britain. The GP was built from 1922 to 1964 by W. W. Greener, and from 1965 to the 1980s by Webley & Scott. The front end of the receiver is split and the barrel is secured via a takedown screw, which enables the barrel to be removed by rotating it 90 degrees after loosening the screw. Unlike the Martini-Henry or the EG, the GP does not feature a cocking indicator but retains the automatic safety.

Two models of the GP were produced, Mark I and II, with the only major exterior difference being a bulkier safety lever and reversing the takedown screw's orientation. Internally, the Mark II employs circlips to retain various pins instead of keeper screws, and as a result the internals are not interchangeable with the Mark I due to the design change done to accommodate the circlips. As the receivers were made in batches and assembled at a later date, it is not unusual to find an earlier serial block receiver mated to a barrel exhibiting more modern proof markings.

By default, the GP is offered with a standard 12-bore (.729" or 18.52mm) barrel with a fixed, full choke (.035" or 0.889mm constriction), but other bore/choke configurations such as .719" (18.26mm) barrels are available upon request. Barrel lengths vary from 26" to 32" and other features such as slings and checkering are optional extras.

=== Greener harpoon gun ===
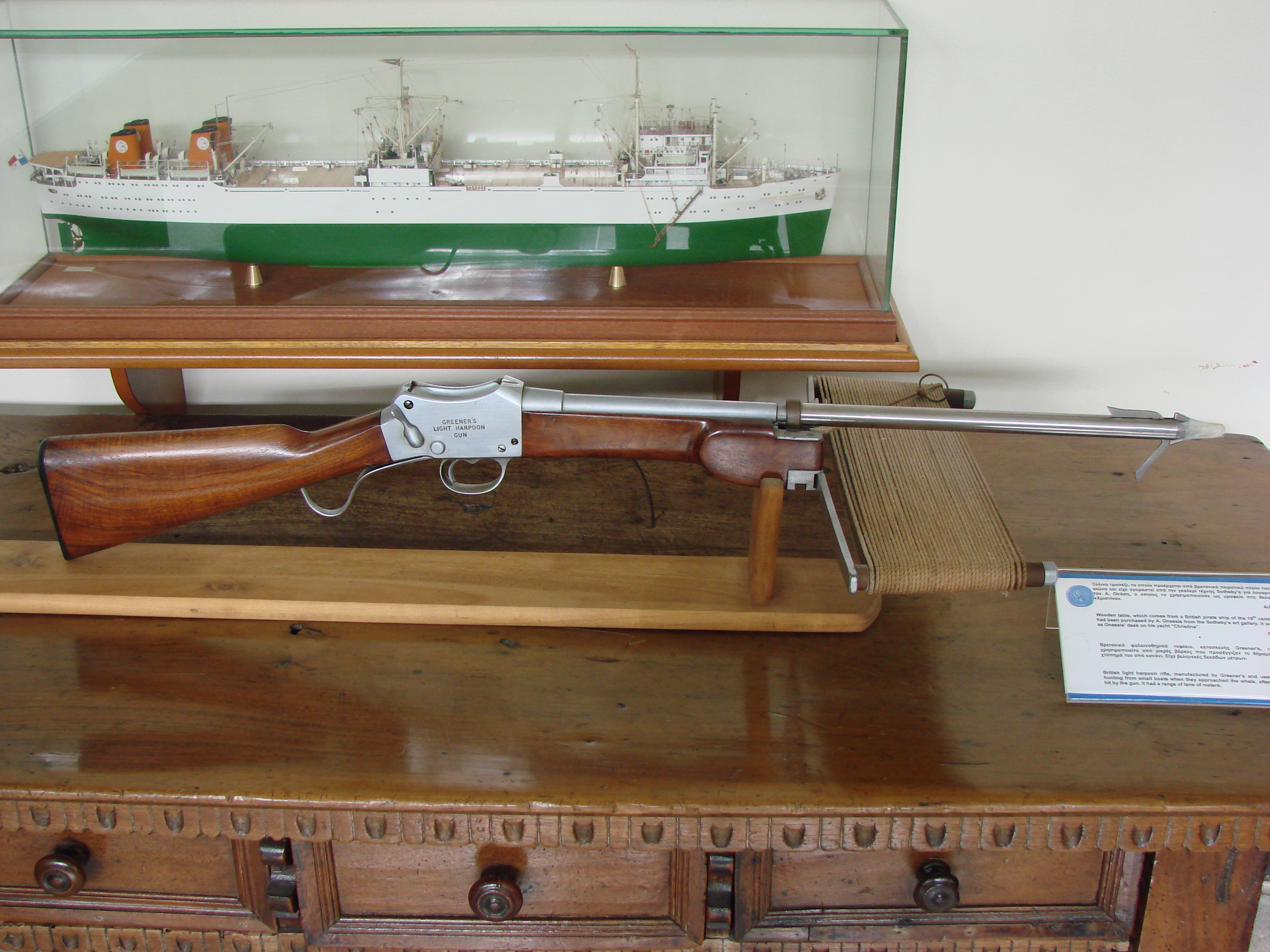
Greener-Martini Light Harpoon Gun.

W. W. Greener also used the Martini action to produce the Greener-Martini Light Harpoon Gun used for whaling, and also for commercial harvest of tuna and other large fish. The gun fired a .38 blank cartridge to propel the harpoon. A special barrel—effectively a hollow tube that acted as a spigot—and stock were fitted to accommodate the harpoon and to lower weight.

=== Ottoman, Romanian, and Boer Republics Peabody–Martini–Henry rifles ===
Unable to purchase Martini–Henry rifles from the British because their entire production was going to rearming British troops, the Ottoman Empire purchased weapons identical to the Mark I from the Providence Tool Company in Providence, Rhode Island, United States (the manufacturers of the somewhat similar Peabody rifle), and used them effectively against the Russians in the Russo-Turkish War (1877–1878). In the Bulgarian front, the Imperial Russian Army armed one regiment with captured Peabody–Martinis after the siege of Plevna, though the logistical difficulties of supplying troops with non-standard ammunition prevented wider use. Ottoman outlaws and folk heroes such as Hekimoğlu famously used the rifle during his raids on landowners. The rifle is referred to as Aynalı Martin in the Ottoman Empire and is featured in several famous folk songs.

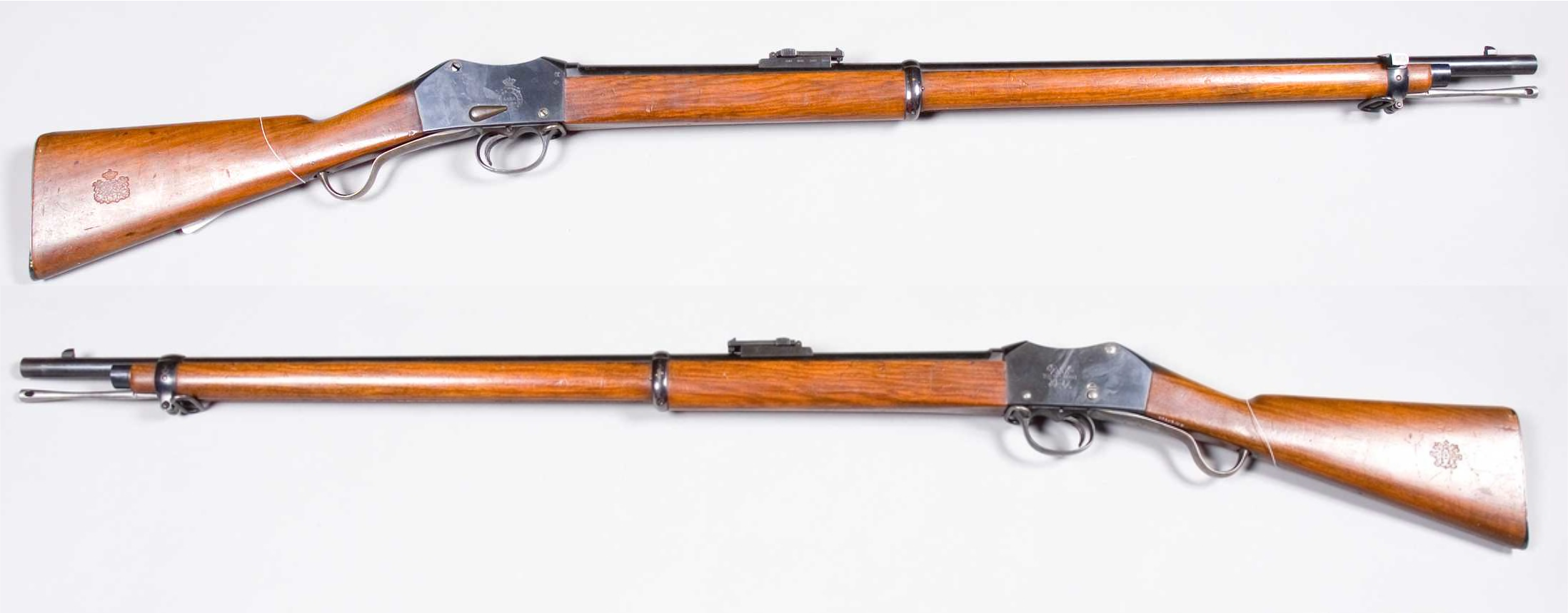
Romanian Martini–Henry M1879

Beginning in 1879, Romania decided to replace its old model 1867 Peabody rifles with the Martini–Henry rifles. An order was made to Steyr for 130,000 rifles which were delivered into the early 1880s. These rifles were also used in the First World War, with 142,906 rifles and 8,724 carbines being registered in service on 15 August 1916.

Significant numbers of the basic design, with variations, were also produced for the Boer Republics, both in Belgium and, via Westley Richards, in Birmingham, as late as the late 1890s. During the Second Boer War, many of the Boers used the Martini–Henry rifle, since over 34,000 of these had been purchased.

== Mechanical issues ==
The rifle suffered from cartridge-extraction problems during the Zulu War, mostly due to the thin, weak, pliable foil brass cartridges used: they expanded too much into the rifle's chamber on detonation, to the point that they stuck or tore open inside the rifle's chamber. It would eventually become difficult to move the breech block and reload the rifle, substantially diminishing its effectiveness, or rendering it useless if the block could not be opened. After investigating the matter, the British Army Ordnance Department determined the fragile construction of the rolled brass cartridge, and fouling due to the black-powder propellant, were the main causes of this problem.

To correct this, the weak rolled brass cartridge was replaced by a stronger drawn brass version, and a longer loading lever was incorporated into the MK-IV to apply greater torque to operate the mechanism when fouled. These later variants were more reliable in battle, although it was not until smokeless nitro powders and copper-jacketed bullets were tried out in these rifles in the 1920s that accuracy and 100% reliability of cartridge case extraction was finally achieved by Birmingham ammunition makers (Kynoch).

English hunters on various safaris, mainly in Africa, found the Martini using a cordite charge and a 500-grain full-metal-jacketed bullet effective in stopping large animals such as hippopotamus up to 80 yards away.

== Operation of the Martini action ==
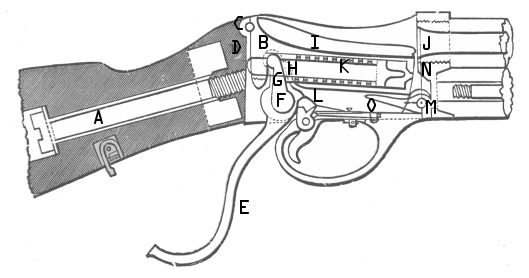
Section of Martini–Henry lock.

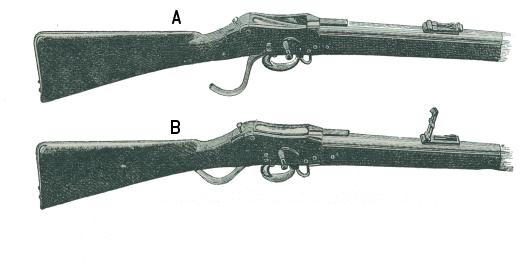
Martini–Henry rifle. A: ready for loading. B: loaded and ready to fire.

The lock and breech are held to the stock by a metal bolt (A). The breech is closed by the block (B) which turns on the pin (C) that passes through the rear of the block. The end of the block is rounded to form a knuckle joint with the back of the case (D) which receives the force of the recoil rather than the pin (C).

Below the trigger-guard the lever (E) works a pin (F) which projects the tumbler (G) into the case. The tumbler moves within a notch (H) and acts upon the block, raising it into the firing position or allowing it to fall according to the position of the lever.

The block (B) is hollowed along its upper surface (I) to assist in inserting a cartridge into the firing chamber (J). To fire the cartridge the block is raised to position the firing mechanism (K) against the cartridge. The firing mechanism consists of a helical spring around a pointed metal striker, the tip of which passes through a hole in the face of the block to impact the percussion-cap of the inserted cartridge. As the lever (E) is moved forward the tumbler (G) revolves and one of its arms engages and draws back the spring until the tumbler is firmly locked in the notch (H) and the spring is held by the rest-piece (L) which is pushed into a bend in the lower part of the tumbler.

After firing, the cartridge is partially extracted by the lock. The extractor rotates on a pin (M) and has two vertical arms (N), which are pressed by the rim of the cartridge pushed home into two grooves in the sides of the barrel. A bent arm (O), forming an 80° angle with the extractor arms, is forced down by the dropping block when the lever is pushed forward, so causing the upright arms to extract the cartridge case slightly and allow easier manual full extraction.

As well as British service rifles, the Martini breech action was applied to shotguns by the Greener company of Britain, whose single-shot "EP" riot guns were still in service in the 1970s in former British colonies. The Greener "GP" shotgun, also using the Martini action, was a favourite rough-shooting gun in the mid-20th century. The Martini action was used by BSA and latterly BSA/Parker Hale for their series of "Small Action Martini" small bore target rifles that were in production until 1955.

== Comparison with contemporary rifles ==
Comparison of 1880s rifles
| Calibre | System | Country | Velocity | | | | | Height of trajectory | | | | Ammunition | |
| Calibre | System | Country | Muzzle | 500 yd (460 m) | 1,000 yd (910 m) | 1,500 yd (1,400 m) | 2,000 yd (1,800 m) | 500 yd (460 m) | 1,000 yd (910 m) | 1,500 yd (1,400 m) | 2,000 yd (1,800 m) | Propellant | Bullet |
|---|---|---|---|---|---|---|---|---|---|---|---|---|---|
| .433 in (11.0 mm) | Werndl–Holub rifle | Austria-Hungary | 1,439 ft/s (439 m/s) | 854 ft/s (260 m/s) | 620 ft/s (190 m/s) | 449 ft/s (137 m/s) | 328 ft/s (100 m/s) | 8.252 ft (2.515 m) | 49.41 ft (15.06 m) | 162.6 ft (49.6 m) | 426.0 ft (129.8 m) | 77 gr (5.0 g) | 370 gr (24 g) |
| .45 in (11.43 mm) | Martini–Henry | United Kingdom | 1,315 ft/s (401 m/s) | 869 ft/s (265 m/s) | 664 ft/s (202 m/s) | 508 ft/s (155 m/s) | 389 ft/s (119 m/s) | 9.594 ft (2.924 m) | 47.90 ft (14.60 m) | 147.1 ft (44.8 m) | 357.85 ft (109.07 m) | 85 gr (5.5 g) | 480 gr (31 g) |
| .433 in (11.0 mm) | Fusil Gras mle 1874 | France | 1,489 ft/s (454 m/s) | 878 ft/s (268 m/s) | 643 ft/s (196 m/s) | 471 ft/s (144 m/s) | 348 ft/s (106 m/s) | 7.769 ft (2.368 m) | 46.6 ft (14.2 m) | 151.8 ft (46.3 m) | 389.9 ft (118.8 m) | 80 gr (5.2 g) | 386 gr (25.0 g) |
| .433 in (11.0 mm) | Mauser Model 1871 | Germany | 1,430 ft/s (440 m/s) | 859 ft/s (262 m/s) | 629 ft/s (192 m/s) | 459 ft/s (140 m/s) | 388 ft/s (118 m/s) | 8.249 ft (2.514 m) | 48.68 ft (14.84 m) | 159.2 ft (48.5 m) | 411.1 ft (125.3 m) | 75 gr (4.9 g) | 380 gr (25 g) |
| .408 in (10.4 mm) | M1870 Italian Vetterli | Italy | 1,430 ft/s (440 m/s) | 835 ft/s (255 m/s) | 595 ft/s (181 m/s) | 422 ft/s (129 m/s) | 304 ft/s (93 m/s) | 8.527 ft (2.599 m) | 52.17 ft (15.90 m) | 176.3 ft (53.7 m) | 469.9 ft (143.2 m) | 62 gr (4.0 g) | 310 gr (20 g) |
| .397 in (10.08 mm) | Jarmann M1884 | Norway and Sweden | 1,536 ft/s (468 m/s) | 908 ft/s (277 m/s) | 675 ft/s (206 m/s) | 504 ft/s (154 m/s) | 377 ft/s (115 m/s) | 7.235 ft (2.205 m) | 42.97 ft (13.10 m) | 137.6 ft (41.9 m) | 348.5 ft (106.2 m) | 77 gr (5.0 g) | 337 gr (21.8 g) |
| .42 in (10.67 mm) | Berdan rifle | Russia | 1,444 ft/s (440 m/s) | 873 ft/s (266 m/s) | 645 ft/s (197 m/s) | 476 ft/s (145 m/s) | 353 ft/s (108 m/s) | 7.995 ft (2.437 m) | 47.01 ft (14.33 m) | 151.7 ft (46.2 m) | 388.7 ft (118.5 m) | 77 gr (5.0 g) | 370 gr (24 g) |
| .45 in (11.43 mm) | Springfield model 1884 | United States | 1,301 ft/s (397 m/s) | 875 ft/s (267 m/s) | 676 ft/s (206 m/s) | 523 ft/s (159 m/s) | 404 ft/s (123 m/s) | 8.574 ft (2.613 m) | 46.88 ft (14.29 m) | 142.3 ft (43.4 m) | 343.0 ft (104.5 m) | 70 gr (4.5 g) | 500 gr (32 g) |
| .40 in (10.16 mm) | Enfield-Martini | United Kingdom | 1,570 ft/s (480 m/s) | 947 ft/s (289 m/s) | 719 ft/s (219 m/s) | 553 ft/s (169 m/s) | 424 ft/s (129 m/s) | 6.704 ft (2.043 m) | 39.00 ft (11.89 m) | 122.0 ft (37.2 m) | 298.47 ft (90.97 m) | 85 gr (5.5 g) | 384 gr (24.9 g) |

== Users ==
- Afghanistan: It was seen in use by some Afghan tribesmen as late as the Soviet invasion. Early in 2010 and 2011, United States Marines recovered at least three from various Taliban weapons caches in Marjah.
- Argentina
- Bolivia
- British Empire: There were four main marks of the Martini–Henry rifle produced: Mark I (released in June 1871), Mark II, Mark III, and Mark IV. There was also an 1877 carbine version with variations that included a Garrison Artillery Carbine, an Artillery Carbine (Mark I, Mark II, and Mark III), and smaller versions designed as training rifles for military cadets. The Mark IV Martini–Henry rifle ended production in 1889, replaced by the Lee–Metford, but it remained in service throughout the British Empire until the end of the First World War.
- Empire of Brazil: In 1872, the Imperial Navy commissioned the Westley Richards improved Martini, manufactured by the Union Armuriére Belge; some rifles suggest they were also issued to volunteer units during the 1890s naval mutinies and federalist conflicts
- Chile
- Khedivate of Egypt
- Ethiopian Empire: Captured during the Egyptian-Ethiopian War, later used during the First Italo-Ethiopian War
- Gaza Empire: Used at the Battle of Magul.
- Kingdom of Greece
- Empire of Japan: Following the arrival of 500 Martini-Henrys via the Schnell Company in 1872, By the time the Satsuma Rebellion occurred, Imperial government forces fielded approximately 2,902 new Martini-Henry rifle alongside their main rifled musket and secondary modern breech-loading rifles issued to other units
- Provisional Irish Republican Army
- Orange Free State
- Ottoman Empire
- Peru
- Rhodesia: Limited use of Greener shotguns during the Rhodesian Bush War.
- Kingdom of Romania
- Russian Empire: Limited use of captured Peabody–Martini rifles during the Russo-Turkish War (1877–1878)
- Siam
- South African Republic
- Sultanate of Zanzibar
- Mahdist Sudan: Captured from Egyptian forces.
- Mthwakazi: Captured from British forces.
- Ulster Volunteers
- Wadai Empire

== See also ==
- British military rifles
- Swinburn–Henry
- Martini–Enfield – the .303 calibre version of the Martini–Henry
- Martini Cadet – Cadet target shooting rifle
- Greener shotgun – the shotgun version of the Martini-Henry
- Guedes Rifle – a Portuguese derivative of the Martini-Henry chambered in 8x60mmR Guedes
