= Marjah Accelerated Agricultural Transition =

The Marjah Accelerated Agricultural Transition (MAAT) was a project of the Afghanistan government and the United States Marine Corps in Marjah, Afghanistan to transition crop farmers from growing opium poppies to growing licit crops over the 2010 growing season. By ceasing to grow opium, one of the Taliban's main sources of income, US forces hope that the Taliban will have less money to utilize for combat.

Farmers who wished to participate signed up with the NGOs, which provide them with seeds and fertilizer to get started in MAAT. Farmers choosing to register with the MAAT program, were required to register their location, croppable land area and proposed crops. Farmer's lands were then checked to ensure that they had killed off their poppies and transitioned to new crops. Those who did change to growing non-opium crops will receive a payment of 3,000 Afghanis and a set of new tools, including a water pump.
