= Marjah =

Town in Helmand Province, Afghanistan

Marjah مارجه
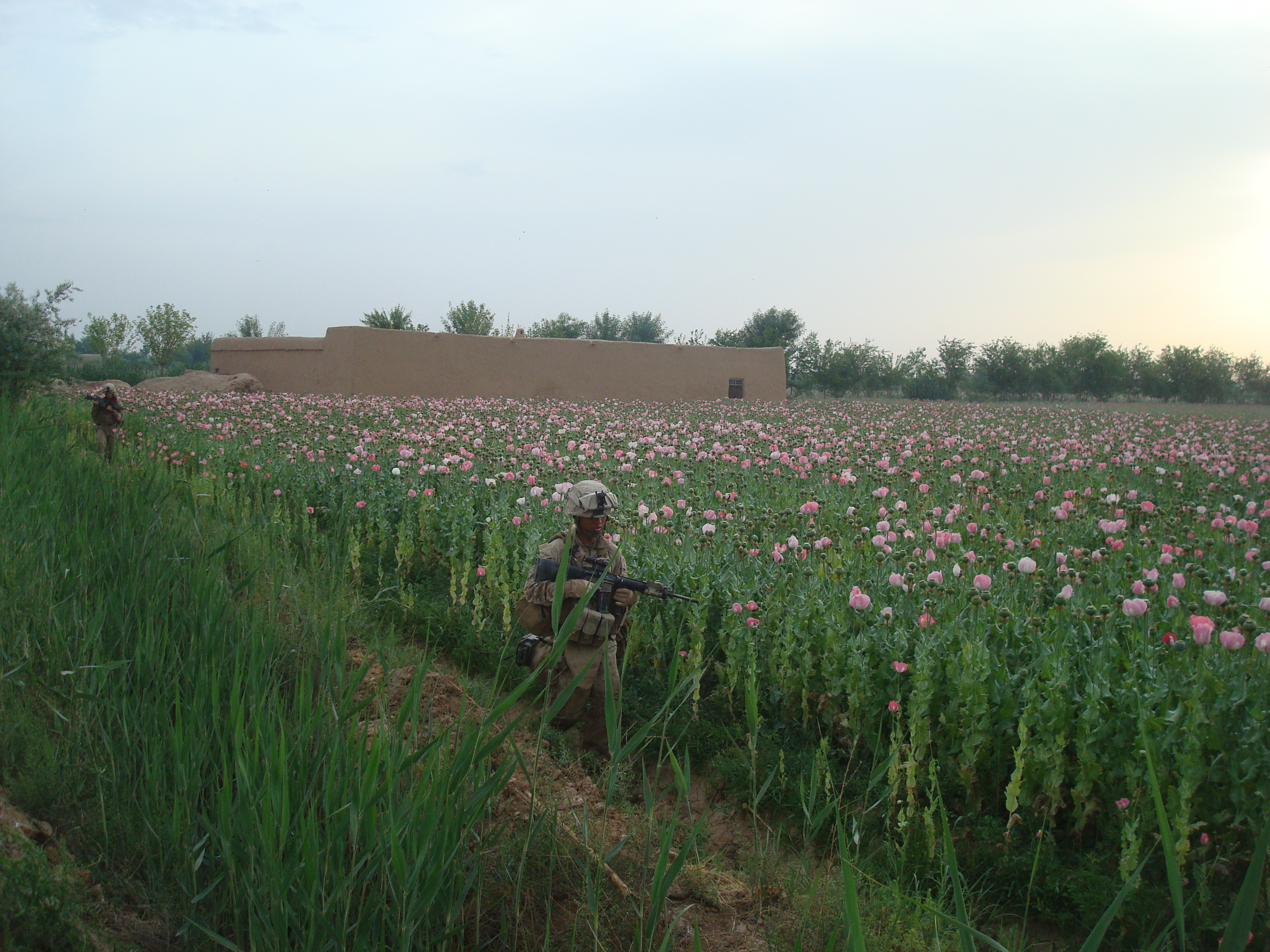
- U.S. Marines on a patrol next to a poppy field in 2010

- Location in Afghanistan
- Coordinates: 31°31′N 64°07′E
- Country: Afghanistan
- Province: Helmand Province
- District: Nad Ali

Population
  - Total: 80−85,000 (disputed); 125,000 (with surrounding area - also disputed)
- Time zone: UTC+4:30

Marjah (also spelled Marjeh) (Pashto: مارجه) is an agricultural town in southern Afghanistan. It has been reported to have a population between 80,000 and 125,000, but some sources argue that its population is much smaller and is spread across 80 to 125 km^{2}, an area larger than Cleveland or Washington, D.C. Another source described Marjah as "a cluster of villages" and "a community of 60,000 persons". The town sits in Nad Ali District of Helmand Province, southwest of the provincial capital Lashkar Gah.

Operation Moshtarak (or the Battle of Marjah) took place in the area.

== Population and economy ==
Marjah is geographically situated in one of Afghanistan's major belts of poppy fields, which are a source of funds for the Taliban. According to one figure, 10% of global illicit opium production in the year 2000 originated from the Marjah/Nad-i-Ali area. During the 1950s and 1960s the United States funded a scheme, run by the Helmand and Arghandab Valley Authority, to irrigate the fields around Marjah (Lashkar Gah/Helmand was nicknamed "Little America"), with many canals remaining to this day.

In conjunction with this American-led development, which included building and staffing a number of local schools, the Afghan government jump-started a program in 1959 to resettle Pashtun nomads to the area, providing them each with "almost 15 acres of land, two oxen and free seeds", with a focus on growing wheat.

== Climate ==
Data collected in the 1950s in the Marjah/Chah-i-Anjirs area showed an average rainfall of over one inch per month from December through March, peaking in January at 2.46 inches. The rest of the year experienced little or no precipitation, and besides January, there was actually a consistent net loss of water through evaporation. June, July, and August experienced average high temperatures of over 100 °F (38 °C), while the average lows in winter bottomed out at just above freezing in December and January.

== See also ==
- Marjah Accelerated Agricultural Transition (2010 project)
- Helmand Province
- Battle of Marjah
