= Black powder cartridge =

Firearm cartridge

- Type: Early complete cartridges

Black powder cartridge refers to a form of self-contained ammunition developed in the 19th century. It typically consists of a metal case containing a primer, a measured charge of black powder, and a lead bullet, often of relatively large caliber. When struck by a firing mechanism, the primer ignites the black powder, which generates expanding gases that propel the bullet through the gun barrel.

From 1865-1900, they replaced earlier muzzle-loading systems and paper cartridges, offering greater reliability, weather resistance, and ease of use. By the end of 19th century, they were superseded by cartridges designed for smokeless powder. Currently, they are employed primarily in historical firearms and replica arms.

== See also ==
- Glossary of firearms terms
- Paper cartridge
- Gunpowder
