= Shin Kalay =

Village in Nangarhar Province, Afghanistan

- Location in Afghanistan
- Coordinates: 31°38′N 64°13′E
- Country: Afghanistan
- Province: Helmand Province
- District: Nad Ali
- Time zone: UTC+4:30

Shin Kalay is a village in Helmand Province, Afghanistan, in the Nad Ali District. It is inhabited by a Pashtun population of 11,000 and adheres to Sharia Islamic law. The village has recently accomplished high feats in education. Given its political background and ultra-conservative placement, advances in the education of boys and girls is a feat recognized and published by the United Nations Office for the Coordination of Humanitarian Affairs (UNOCHA).

Green Village Schools (GVS), an Oregon-based non-profit organization, has worked over the past fourteen years to construct the most modern educational facility ever established in the region. The school, named after GVS Founder/President Mohammad Khan Kharoti, has a student enrollment of over 1,700 students including over 550 girls. As of 2014, the school has a total of 37 rooms. There are fourteen classrooms for boys and 10 classrooms for girls. There is a computer lab, storage room, bathroom facilities and small library for the students to use.

== See also ==
- Helmand Province
