= Nad Ali District =

Nad Ali نادعلی
- District
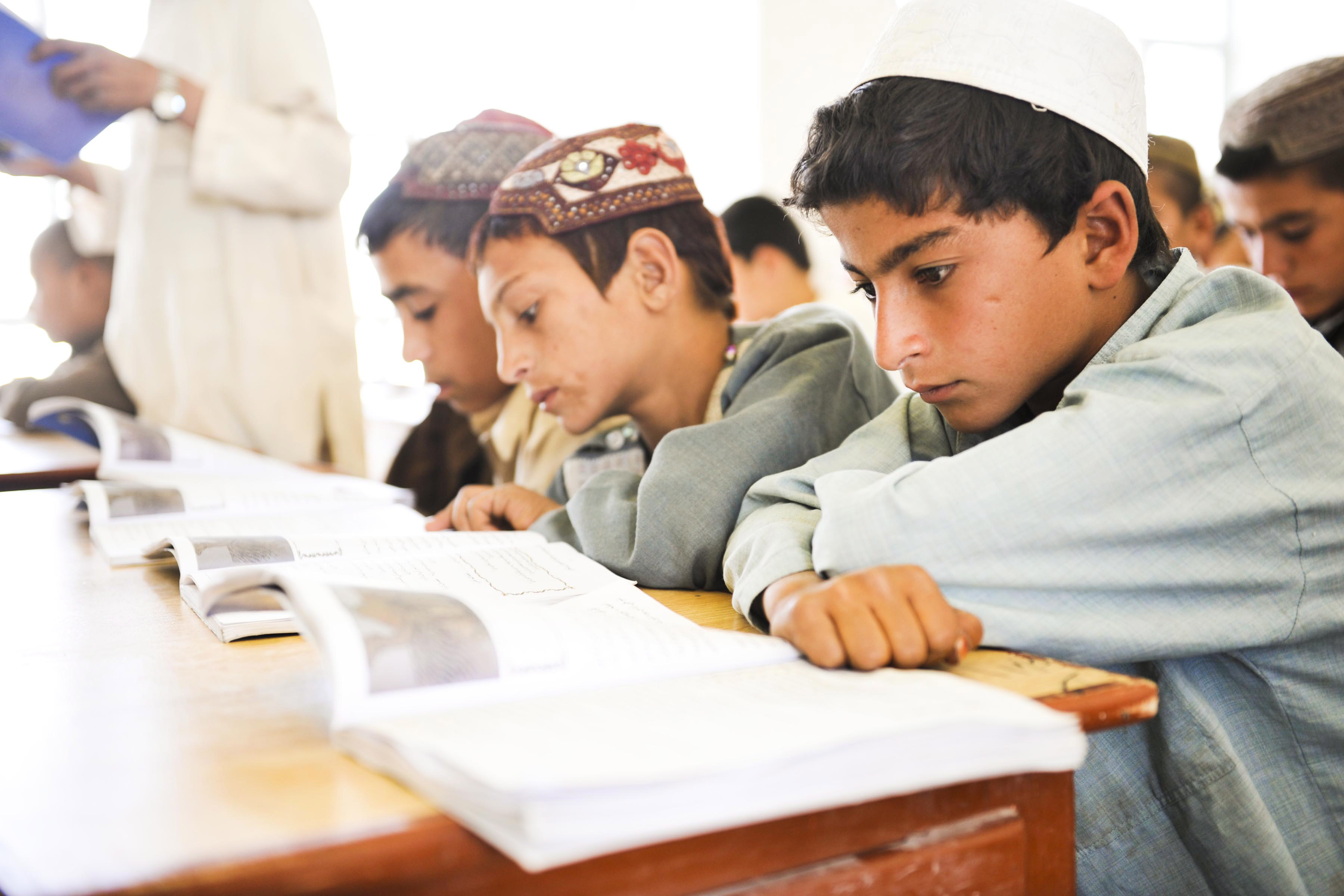
- Students during a lesson at Nad e Ali Central School in Helmand.

- Location within Afghanistan
- Coordinates: 31°38′N 64°14′E
- Country: Afghanistan
- Province: Helmand Province

Population (2012)
  - Total: 88,600

Nad Ali (Pashto: ناد علي) is a district in Helmand Province, Afghanistan. Marja is an unincorporated agricultural district in Nad Ali. The area is irrigated by the Helmand and Arghandab Valley Authority (HAVA). A small town of the same name lies 11 km to the west of the Helmand River, at the coordinates shown at the top of the page. The town of Nad-e Ali was built in 1954 as part of the HAVA irrigation project, and was settled by 3,000 predominantly Pashtun families who were given newly arable land.

The village of Shin Kalay has made advances in the education of children that was recognized and published by the United Nations Office for the Coordination of Humanitarian Affairs (UNOCHA).

== War in Afghanistan (2001–2021) ==
During the International Security Assistance Force occupation, Nad Ali was in the UK area of responsibility. On 9 February 2011, soldiers from the Parachute Regiment were patrolling in north of Nad-e Ali district when they were hit by small arms fire, resulting in two fatalities.

Nad Ali was the scene of several intense firefights during the course of the war in Afghanistan.

In 2014, a patrol formed of soldiers from the Household Cavalry Regiment, and the 1st Light Armored Reconnaissance Battalion were involved in a 40 hour long gunfight with Taliban fighters in and around the town.
