= Small-bore =

Small-bore refers to calibers with a diameter of .32 in (8.1 mm) or smaller. It may also refer to small-bore rifle competition. The medium-bore refers to calibers with a diameter between .33 in (8.4 mm) up to .39 in (9.9 mm) and large-bore refers to calibers with a diameter of .40 in (10 mm) or larger. Miniature bore refers historically to calibers of .22 in (5.6 mm) or smaller.

There is much variance in the use of the term small-bore, which over the years has changed considerably with anything under .577 in (14.7 mm) caliber considered small-bore prior to the mid-19th century.

== Small-bore competition ==
Small-bore competition often refers to shooting competitions conducted with .22 Rimfire target rifles.

== See also ==
- List of rifle cartridges
- Table of handgun and rifle cartridges
