= Operation Herrick =

2003–2014 British military operations in Afghanistan

- Part of War in Afghanistan (2001–2021) and the war on terror
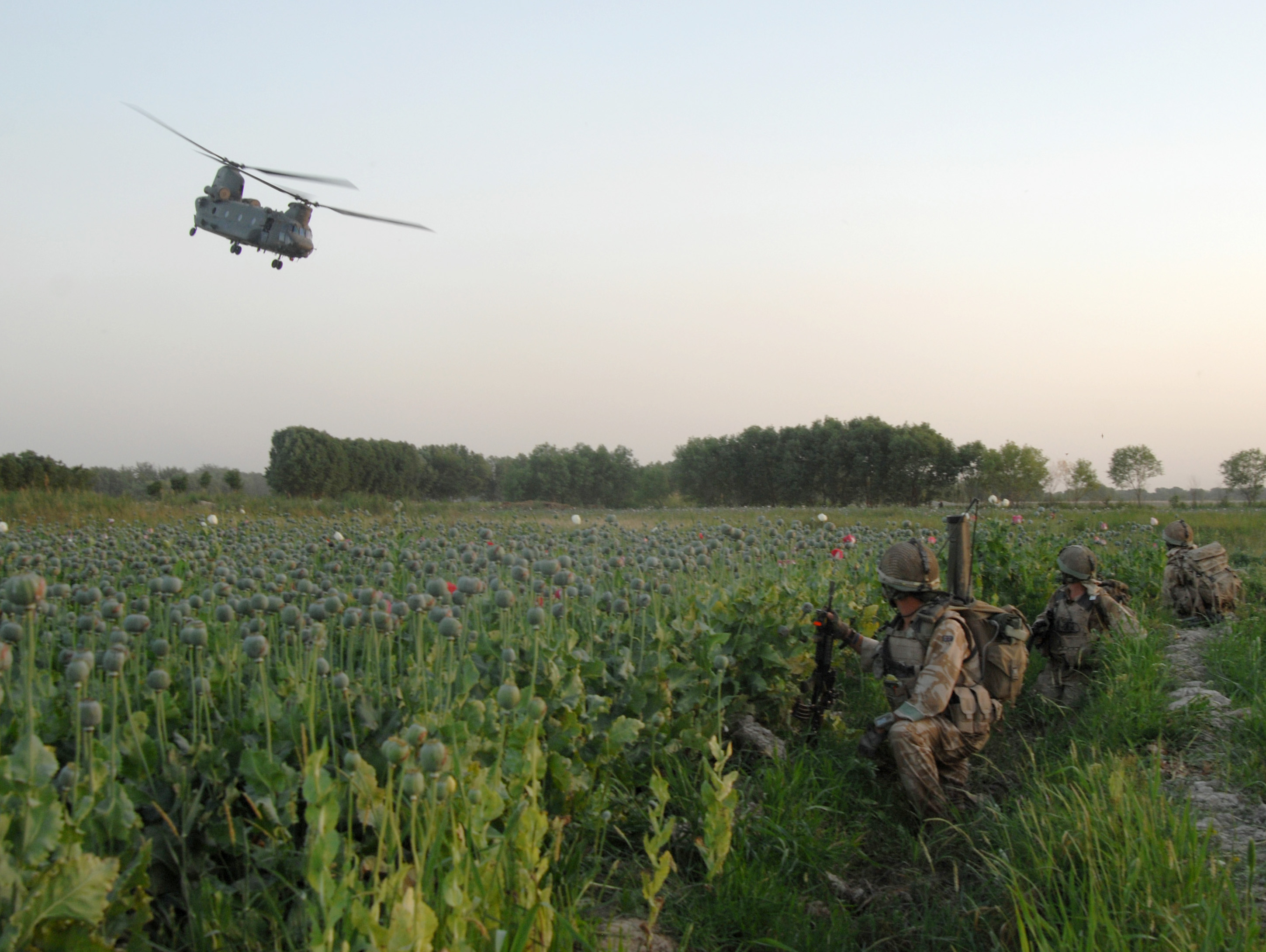
- Soldiers of the Coldstream Guards's 1st Battalion in a poppy field waiting for a Chinook helicopter to extract them, following operations in Helmand Province, Afghanistan, in 2012
Date	20 June 2003 – 12 December 2014
Location	Afghanistan, Asia
Result	End of Operation Herrick. Start of Operation Toral.

Belligerents
United Kingdom	Taliban; Al-Qaeda

Commanders and leaders
(United Kingdom) Tony Blair (Prime Minister 1997–2007) (United Kingdom) Gordon Brown (Prime Minister 2007–2010) (United Kingdom) David Cameron (Prime Minister 2010–2016)	Mullah Omar # Osama bin Laden †

Units involved
Various units of the British Army, Royal Navy, Royal Marines and Royal Air Force	

Strength
150,000 over duration of operation	Unknown

Casualties and losses
454 killed 1 recon plane crashed	Unknown

Operation Herrick was the operational name for the British Armed Forces' operations during the War in Afghanistan, from 2002 to the end of combat operations in 2014. It consisted of the British contribution to the multinational NATO-led International Security Assistance Force (ISAF) mission for the purposes of local security, training and development, and support to the American-led Operation Enduring Freedom (OEF) counterterrorism mission. After years in the field, Operation Herrick increased in size and breadth to match ISAF's growing geographical intervention in Afghanistan: British troops numbered 9,500 at its peak in 2010–2012. The operation has also been referred to as the Fourth Anglo-Afghan War.

Initially, the operation consisted mainly of security in Kabul and training of the Afghan National Army until it grew into a battalion when British troops took over the PRT for northern Afghanistan. As of 2004, there were some 400 British personnel in Afghanistan, rising to 900 in 2005. With the expansion of ISAF operations, over 3,000 British troops were deployed to the volatile, heroin-rich province of Helmand in southern Afghanistan from April 2006 to lead the local PRT, with Britain also on a leading role in counternarcotics. Intended to be a civilian reconstruction mission, British troops were unexpectedly forced to engage in heavy combat with Taliban militants who fiercely resisted their presence, fueled in part by local resentment from colonial-era conflict. Heavy fighting in the summer of 2006 during the Siege of Sangin was described as the fiercest the British army had faced since the Korean War. While there had only been five British fatalities in Afghanistan up until that point, in 2006 alone this number escalated to 39 deaths and kept increasing annually, peaking at over one hundred each in 2009 and 2010. Troop numbers during Operation Herrick rose to 8,000 in 2008 and later at over 9,000.

The UK began withdrawing throughout 2013, continuing until the last of its combat troops left Afghanistan on 27 October 2014. Following this, British military operations in Afghanistan focused on training as part of Operation Toral, the UK's contribution to the NATO Resolute Support Mission, which continued until the ultimate countrywide 2021 Taliban victory after the defeat of the Islamic Republic of Afghanistan. A total of 454 British personnel had died on operations in Afghanistan from 2002 to 2014, (Note: 453 if excluding the death of Michael Campbell who died after Herrick from injuries sustained during the operation.) outnumbering the amount killed during the Iraq and Falklands wars. While British involvement in Afghanistan had solid support politically and from the public, there was criticism for strategic military failures of the Helmand campaign, its resulting death toll, and the lacklustre "war on opium".

== Preceding operations ==
Operation Herrick superseded two previous efforts in Afghanistan which began in 2001: the first of these was Operation Veritas, an offensive combat operation of support during the United States invasion of Afghanistan that began in October 2001 and ended in July 2002, with the last major action being a sweep in east Afghanistan by 1,700 Royal Marines during Operation Jacana. The second was Operation Fingal, a peacekeeping mission for safety and security in Kabul that Britain along with nineteen other countries contributed to. Led by Major General John McColl, the UK was for its initial six months the leading ISAF force, with a contribution of 2,000 troops in the mission. Command was subsequently transferred to NATO ally Turkey as of June 2002, and the British contingent was scaled back to 300. After this point, all British combat operations in Afghanistan were conducted under Operation Herrick. Overall, there had been one British casualty before Herrick, namely Lance Corporal Darren George who suffered an accidental death during a security patrol caused by another British soldier.

== Strategy ==
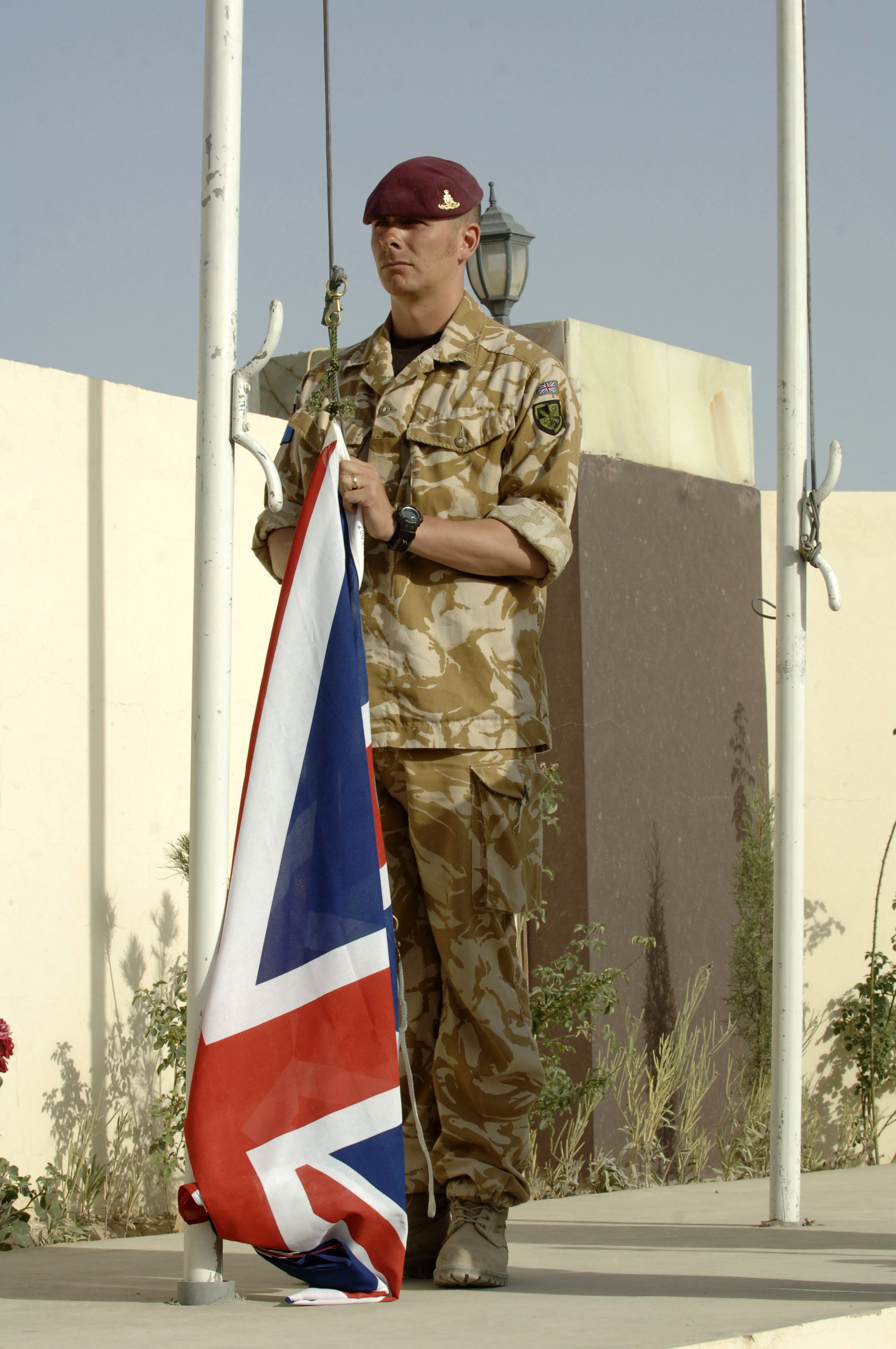
A British soldier of 21 (Gibraltar 1779–83) Air Assault Battery, Royal Artillery raising the Union Flag during a transfer of authority ceremony in Lashkar Gah, Helmand Province in May 2006

The goals of the UK and its allies in Afghanistan, as set in the UN mandate, was the development of Afghan institutions and protection of it and the local populace from Taliban insurgents, as well as ensuring that al-Qaeda do not regain a foothold in the country for the purpose of terrorism against Britain and other countries. In addition, then Prime Minister Tony Blair also cited the farming of opium, with 90% of heroin drugs in Britain's streets originating from Afghanistan, which Blair cited as another reason for supporting the US invasion of Afghanistan in 2001.

It was the UK Government's position that the UK could not disengage from Afghanistan and so retained an active military presence until December 2014 (particularly Helmand province) because of the continued terrorist threat facing Britain and the world. Building a strong Afghan state is a long and difficult task. The Liberal–Conservative coalition government (May 2010 – May 2015) declared that Afghanistan was the UK's top foreign policy priority.

Despite being the UK's largest operational military deployment as of 2008, the BBC described the operation in Iraq at the time as "by far the most high profile UK commitment overseas".

== Kabul & Northern Afghanistan ==
Between 2002 and 2003, the primary component of Herrick remained the 300 personnel providing security in Kabul and training to the new Afghan National Army (ANA). In mid-2003, the operation became battalion strength when a provincial reconstruction team (PRT) was established in Mazari Sharif and in Maymana. The UK also provided a rapid reaction force for the area.

Overall command of the PRTs was transferred to ISAF in 2004. Sweden and Norway took over these PRTs in 2005 and 2006 respectively to allow the UK to focus on south Afghanistan. In early 2006, the NATO Headquarters Allied Rapid Reaction Corps (ARRC) became the headquarters of ISAF for a year. The attached British infantry and signals personnel raised the number of troops based in Kabul to 1,300.

== Kandahar ==
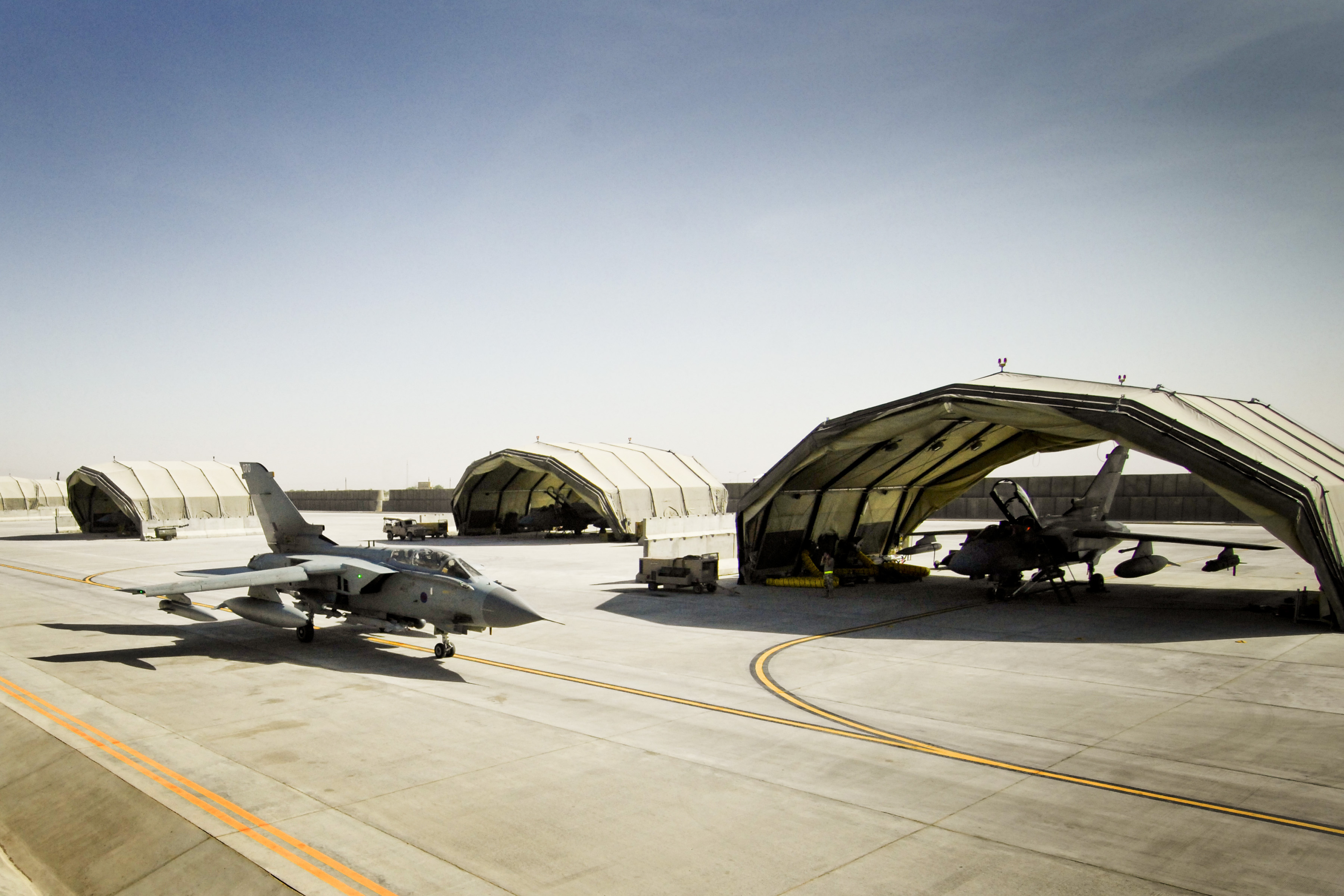
A 12 Sqn Tornado GR4 at Kandahar Airfield

In 2004, a detachment of six Royal Air Force fighters from Joint Force Harrier was based at Kandahar Airfield to support American OEF forces there. A planned withdrawal in mid-2006 was postponed to provide air support for the new ISAF expansion across the south. The force was later reinforced with more Harriers and an RAF Regiment squadron. The Harriers were withdrawn in 2009 and replaced by a Panavia Tornado GR4 squadron on rotation.

On 2 September 2006, a Hawker Siddeley Nimrod MR2 patrol aircraft, serial number XV230 supporting Canadian forces in Operation Medusa crashed near Kandahar, killing all 14 service members aboard. The cause was related to fuel lines.

4 more Harrier GR9s were committed in May 2007 bringing them to a total of eleven, along with an extra C130 transport plane and four Westland Sea Kings from the Fleet Air Arm. Harriers have been succeeded by Tornados. Merlin and Chinook helicopters are also based there.

The majority of aircraft deployed for Herrick were based at Kandahar.

== Helmand ==
=== Mission ===
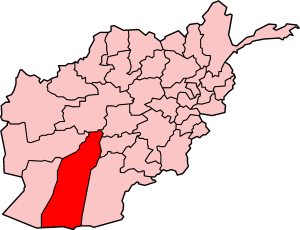
Map showing Helmand province in Afghanistan where British troops were mostly located.

In January 2006, Defence Secretary John Reid announced the UK would send a PRT with several thousand personnel to Helmand, in southern Afghanistan, for at least three years. This had been planned as part of the gradual expansion of ISAF's area of responsibility from the Kabul region to the rest of Afghanistan. An initial strength of 5,700 personnel in Afghanistan was planned, which would stabilise to around 4,500 for the rest of the deployment.

The move was to be a coordinated effort with other NATO countries to relieve the predominantly American OEF presence in the south. To this end, the Netherlands and Canada would lead similar deployments in Oruzgan and Kandahar respectively. Several other countries would support this move with troops. In the case of Helmand, Denmark sent 750 troops while Estonia would increase their Helmand force to 150 soldiers, altogether called Task Force Helmand.

Helmand was a volatile region with local conflicts over drugs and land, and where the Afghan army were "non-existent". Local Taliban figures voiced opposition to the incoming British force and pledged to resist it. Ashraf Ghani, the Kabul University chancellor at the time, reportedly told a British planner in 2005 that there could be no worse peacekeeping force sent to Helmand than the UK, due to local sensitivity and its proximity to the site of the 1880 Battle of Maiwand, predicting a "bloodbath" as a result. Locals and Taliban propaganda called the British presence in Helmand the 'Fourth Anglo-Afghan War', viewing it as colonial Brits returning with "vengenance" for Victorian era defeats. In 2009, MP Bernard Jenkin, during a parliamentary debate on Afghanistan and Pakistan, described the 2006 deployment to Helmand as "one of the most ill-judged and ill-conceived military deployments of modern decades".

=== Activities ===
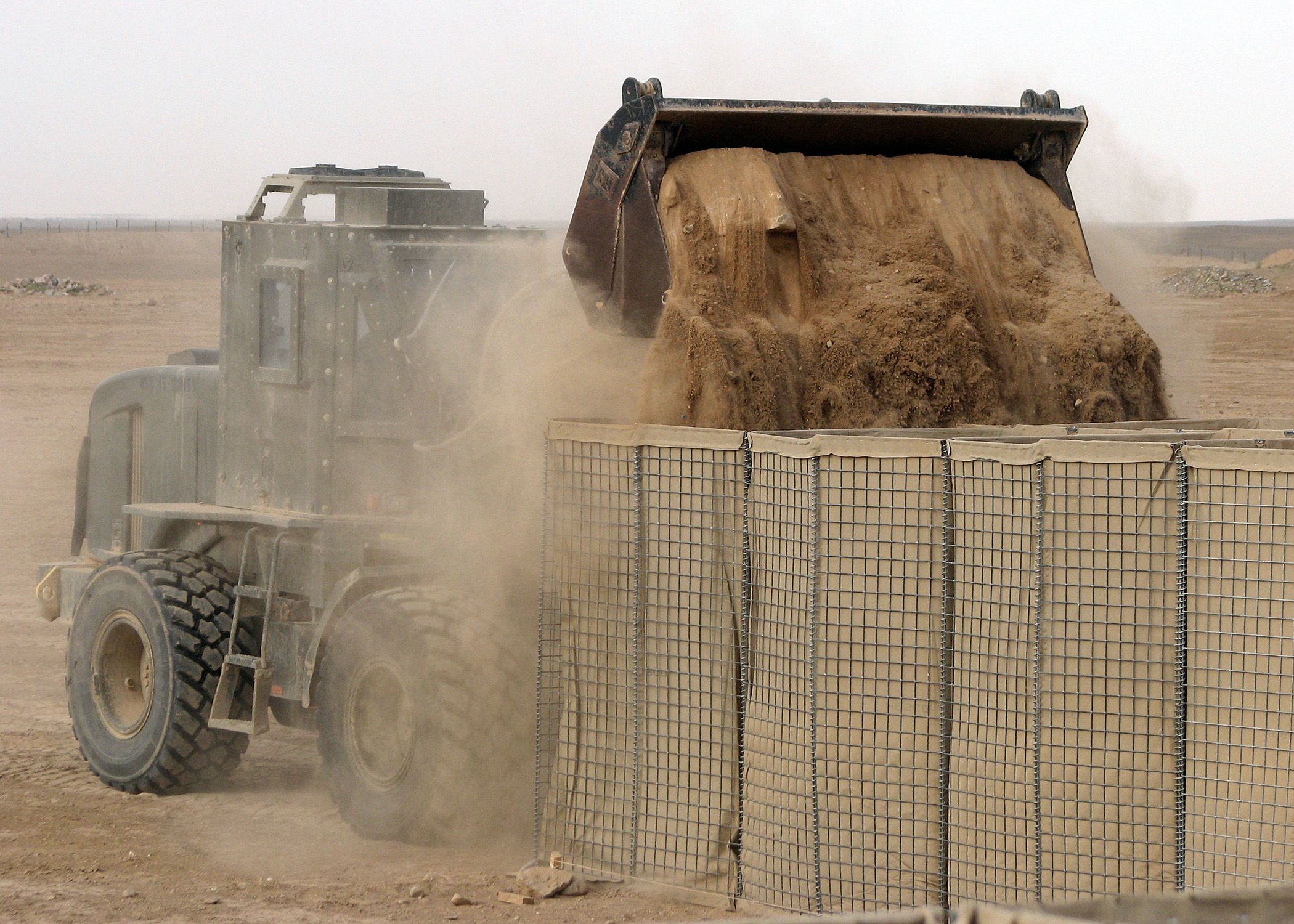
A front end loader filling HESCO barriers during a project at Camp Bastion

Before the main deployment, the Royal Engineers constructed a central fortification, Camp Bastion, to serve as a main base. A camp for an Afghan force (Camp Shorabak, initially for 3rd Brigade, 205th Corps) was built nearby. On 1 May, the US OEF force was relieved in a ceremony. At the same time, the United States began a major offensive, Operation Mountain Thrust, against the insurgency in south Afghanistan. This brought ISAF forces into open conflict with the Taliban.

British forces originally tried to provide security to reconstruction, but instead became engaged in combat. Platoon houses were soon established in northern settlements, due to pressure from the provincial governor for an aggressive stance. However, these quickly became a focus for heavy fighting. One of these was in Sangin, which was cut off and surrounded by the Taliban in early July. Eleven soldiers were killed in Sangin District over the subsequent period. On 16 July, with support from American and Canadian forces, 200 paratroopers were airlifted to take the town.

In early August, 500 paratroopers and Afghan National Army (ANA) soldiers were airlifted to Musa Quala after violence flared around the platoon house. One British soldier was killed in the battle. On 25 August, several hundred soldiers were involved in a second operation to escort a group of Afghan policemen as a show of force.

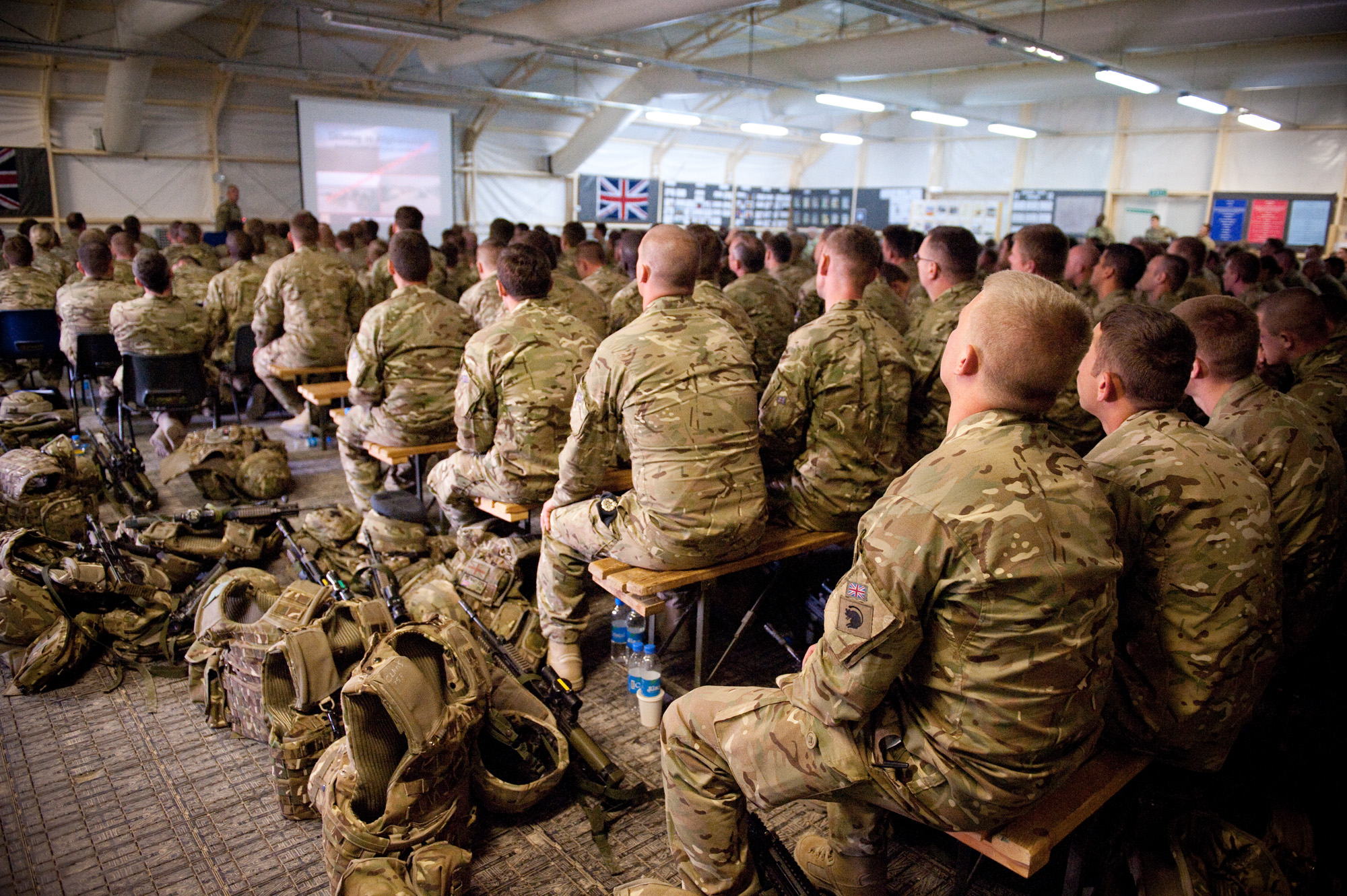
Newly arrived soldiers listen to a briefing in 2012

The Taliban made direct assaults on the British-held compounds, attacking with small arms fire, RPGs, and mortar rounds at short range. The British responded with airstrikes and artillery, often aimed right outside their compound walls, in what became a close quarters battle.

Casualties increased on both sides, with many more Taliban casualties as their assault had exposed them to the full scope of NATO's heavier firepower. Numbers of civilian casualties and damage to local infrastructure increased. The NATO forces grew increasingly concerned that they were alienating residents with heavy-handed tactics, in spite of their intention to win "hearts and minds". It was also becoming clear that the British did not have the number of troops and helicopters to sustain the platoon house strategy indefinitely under the circumstances. Realising that the situation could not carry on unchanged, British commanders approached local tribal leaders to organise a temporary ceasefire.

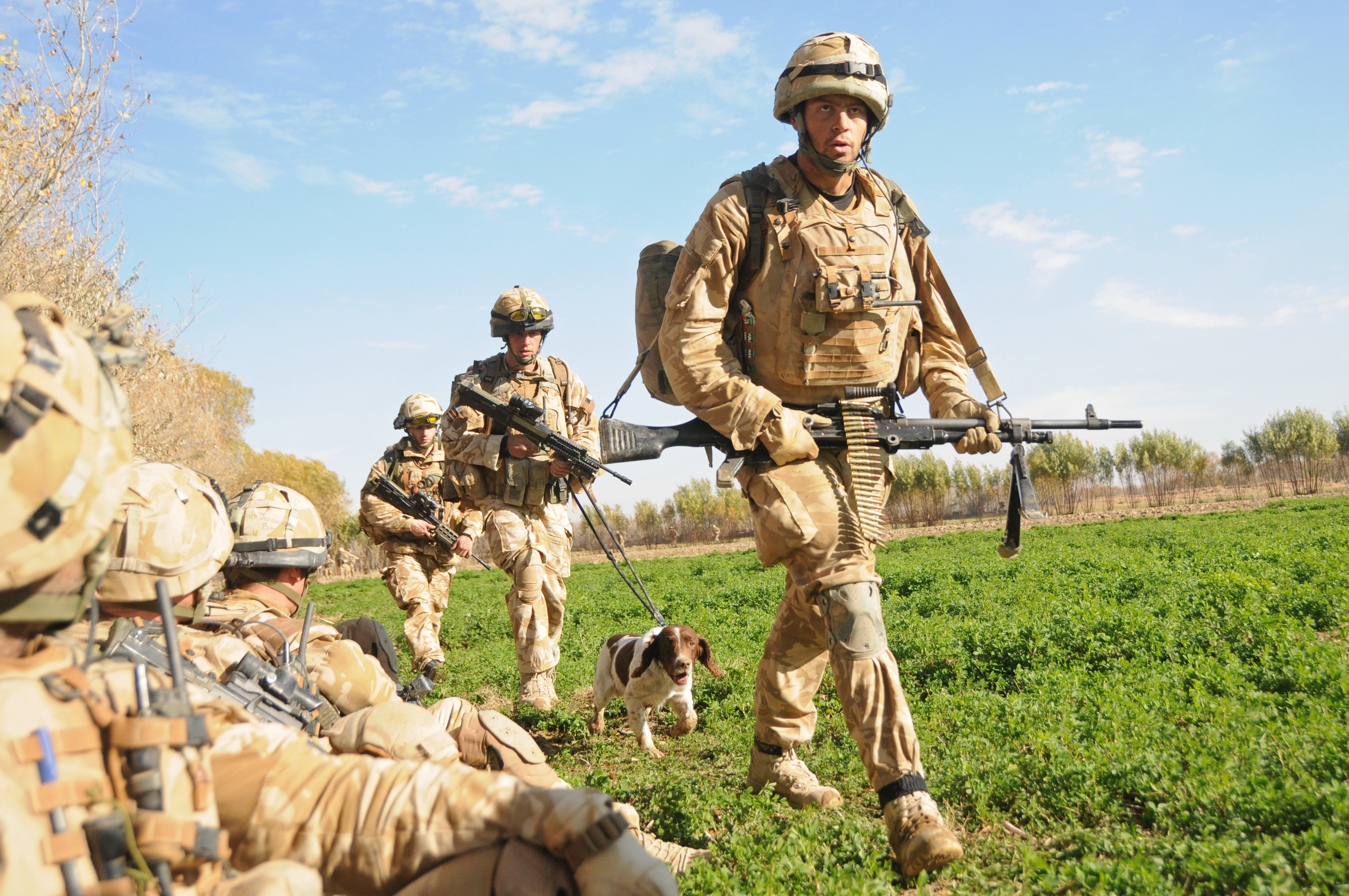
British troops on patrol during Operation Sond Chara

Through pressure from the local tribal elders and their mounting casualties, the Taliban agreed to withdraw from the contested towns at the same time as the British, having been unable to realise their goal of forcibly expelling the foreign troops. NATO estimated Taliban losses over the summer period to be around 1,000 killed in Helmand alone.

The British commander, Brigadier Ed Butler, later said the deal had come just 48 hours before Musa Quala was planned to be abandoned because of the risks support helicopters were taking. As a result of the deal, British forces peacefully withdrew from the settlement in mid October. The truce drew criticism from American commanders who believed it showed a sign of weakness on NATO's part. The deal would again be called into question when the Taliban retook the town of Musa Qala by surprise in February 2007, following the killing of a leading commander in an American airstrike. The town was eventually retaken by British and Afghan forces.

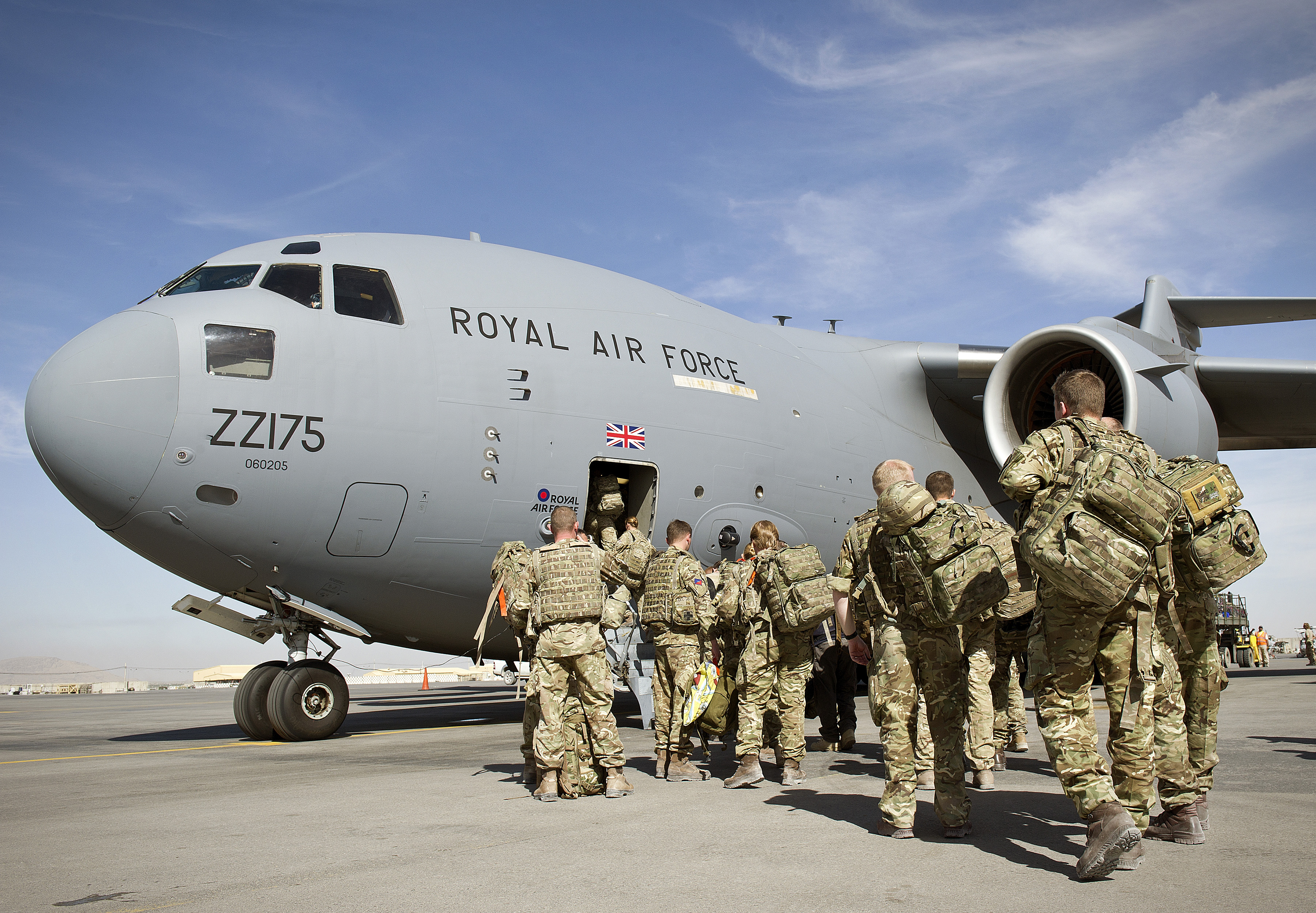
UK troops leaving Afghanistan in 2014

By late September, 31 British soldiers had died in Afghanistan over the year. Corporal Mark Wright, was posthumously awarded the George Cross and Corporal Bryan Budd was posthumously awarded the Victoria Cross, the British Armed Forces' highest awards for gallantry. Brigadier Butler declared the Taliban to have been "tactically defeated" for the time being.

=== Response ===
The stress of operations was admitted to be unexpected by the Ministry of Defence, and there was increasing pressure to send more forces to Helmand. Lieutenant General David J. Richards said that this was the heaviest persistent combat the British Armed Forces had experienced since the Korean War or the Second World War.

As a result, Operation Herrick was increased to 7,700 personnel. Additional aircraft, artillery pieces (including 4 GMLRS) and armoured vehicles (such as Warrior IFVs), an additional Platoon of Snipers were also sent.

=== Operation Mar Karadad ===
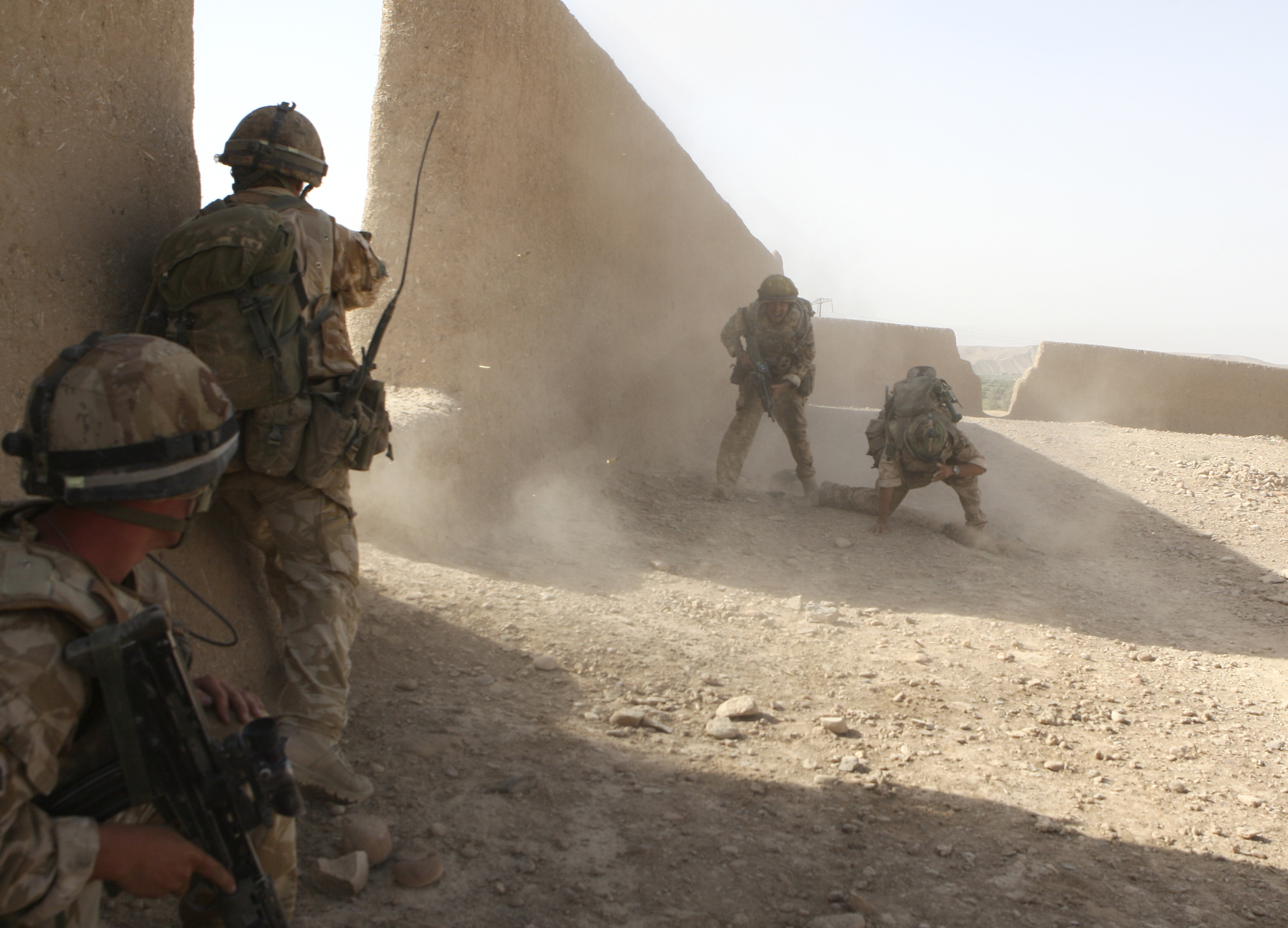
3 Para in combat in near Kajaki

As of December 8, 2007, an alleged 2000 Taliban rebels occupied Musa Qala. Coalition forces prepared for a siege of the town. Operation Mar Karadad (translated as Operation Snakebite) was commanded by HQ Task Force Helmand, a bolstered HQ 52 Infantry Brigade, supported by 82nd Airborne Task Force Corsair. Afghan troops supported by British, Danish and US troops fought for control of the town, which was a major Taliban drug trafficking station and the Taliban's only occupied village in the strategically crucial Helmand province. It was considered to be of symbolic importance to both international forces and insurgents operating in the area.

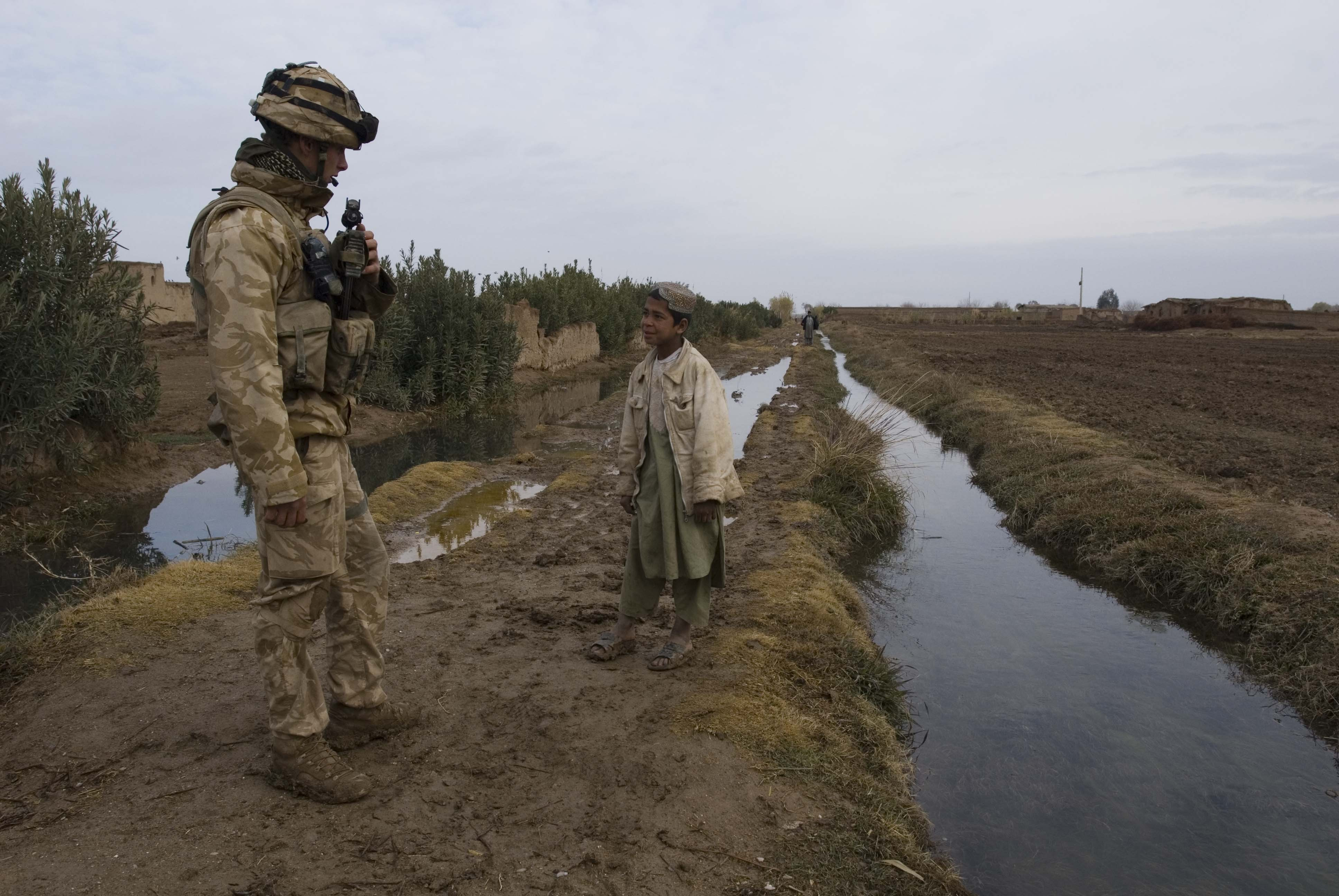
A Royal Marines Commando interacting with a child

There had been some civilian evacuation, partly aided by the aerial dropping of leaflets warning of the impending battle. In preparation, it was believed that the village was heavily mined by Taliban fighters. Sergeant Lee Johnson of the 2nd Bn The Yorkshire Regiment was killed shortly after 10am on 8 December 2007, whilst taking part in an operation to recapture the town, when a land mine exploded. The Taliban insurgents withdrew from the area by midday on 10 December leaving the Afghan army and NATO forces in control of the town. This was the major operation of Operation HERRICK 7 for Task Force Helmand.

=== Operation Volcano ===
In early February 2007, at the end of a six-week operation, the Royal Marines cleared 25 Taliban compounds in the proximity of the Kajaki hydroelectric dam in order to allow repair work to be conducted on the machinery.

=== Operation Achilles ===
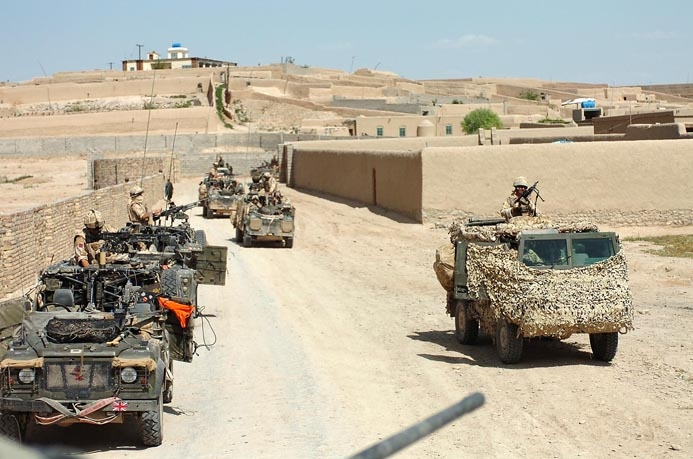
British Land Rovers patrol Sangin.

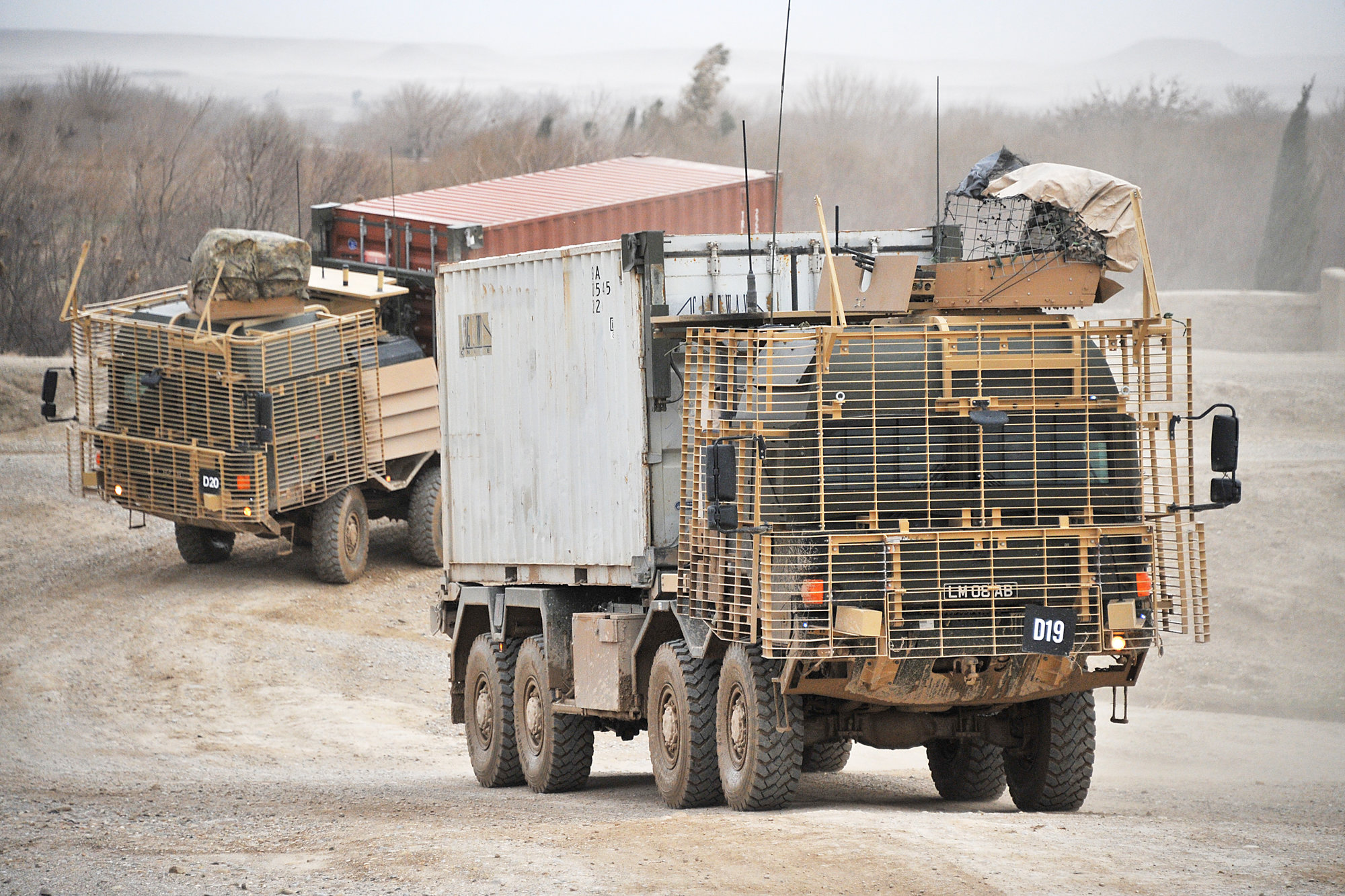
Cargo transport convoy

In between early March to late May 2007, the British led Operation Achilles, NATO's drive to push the Taliban out of Helmand.

In early May 2007 Operation Silver, a sub-operation of Achilles, successfully expelled Taliban fighters from the town of Sangin. It was followed in mid-May by Operation Silicon, where British led forces removed the Taliban from Gereshk and much of the surrounding countryside. The Royal Engineers then set up three camps in the area for the Afghan National Army. The book "The Junior Officers Reading Club" documents Operation Silicon.

=== Operation Lastay Kulang ===
A follow-up to Achilles, Operation Lastay Kulang was launched on 30 May 2007 near the village of Kajaki Sofle, 10 kilometres to the southwest of Kajaki, to remove a Taliban force encamped there. A force of 1000 British troops, another thousand ISAF soldiers, and elements of the Afghan National Army moved into the area to confront the insurgents. On the night of 30 May the American 82nd Airborne Division conducted an air assault on enemy positions during which one of their Chinook helicopters crashed, apparently due to enemy fire, killing five Americans, a Briton and a Canadian.

By the second of June, ISAF and Afghan forces had isolated several pockets of insurgent fighters in the north and south of the Upper Sangin valley. In an effort to win over local support, the Royal Engineers have started work on several reconstruction projects, such as digging irrigation ditches to help farmers in the area. Operation Lastay Kulang is described in the book, Attack State Red, about the Royal Anglian Battle Group in Helmand.

=== Taliban spring offensive ===
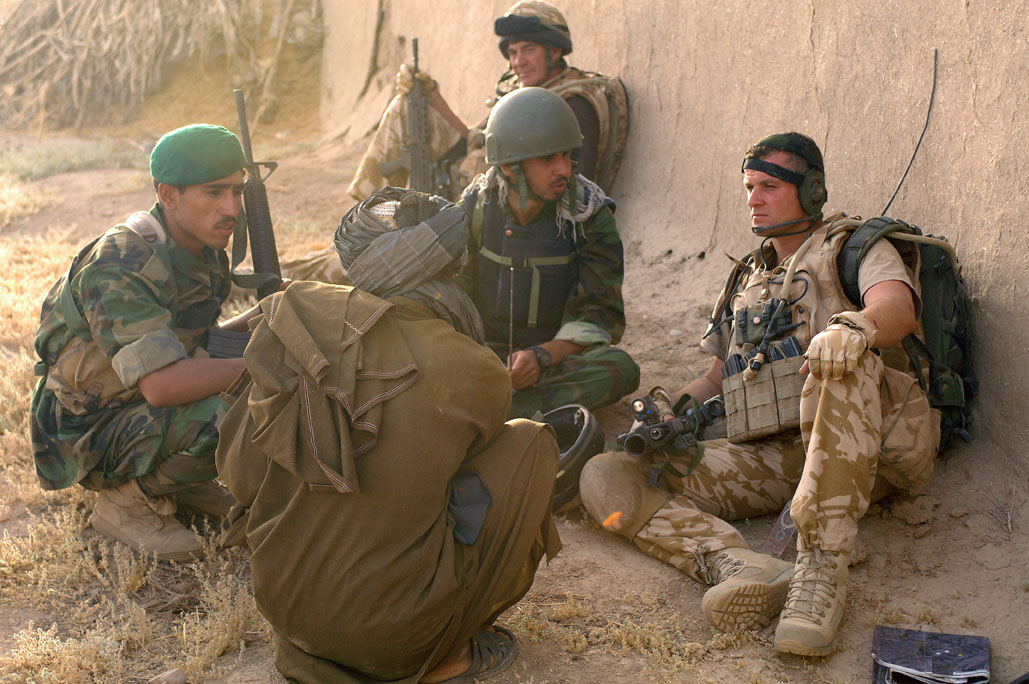
A British Member of the Kajaki Operational Mentoring Liaison Team, discusses the local situation with a local resident via a translator and Afghan National Army soldier during a patrol north of the Kajaki Dam.

By late May 2007 the Taliban spring offensive promised for March 2007 had failed to materialise. This is put down in part to the massive casualties the Taliban took while trying to storm British strongholds across Helmand and by systematic attacks on their mid-level commanders during operations over the winter, which has hampered their ability to coordinate large troop movements.

The Daily Telegraph reported that they wouldn't "discount the Taliban as a spent force just yet", as an "increase in enemy tempo" was expected. As of October 2008 the number of clashes has risen from five a day to 15, lasting from 10 minutes to 11 hours.

In a new development, it has been reported that the Taliban may be recruiting child soldiers from the tribal areas of neighbouring Pakistan to fight coalition forces.

=== Build-up to summer offensive ===
In February 2008 the Taliban prepared for the summer offensive with a number of attacks on JTAC Hill.

=== British royal family involvement ===
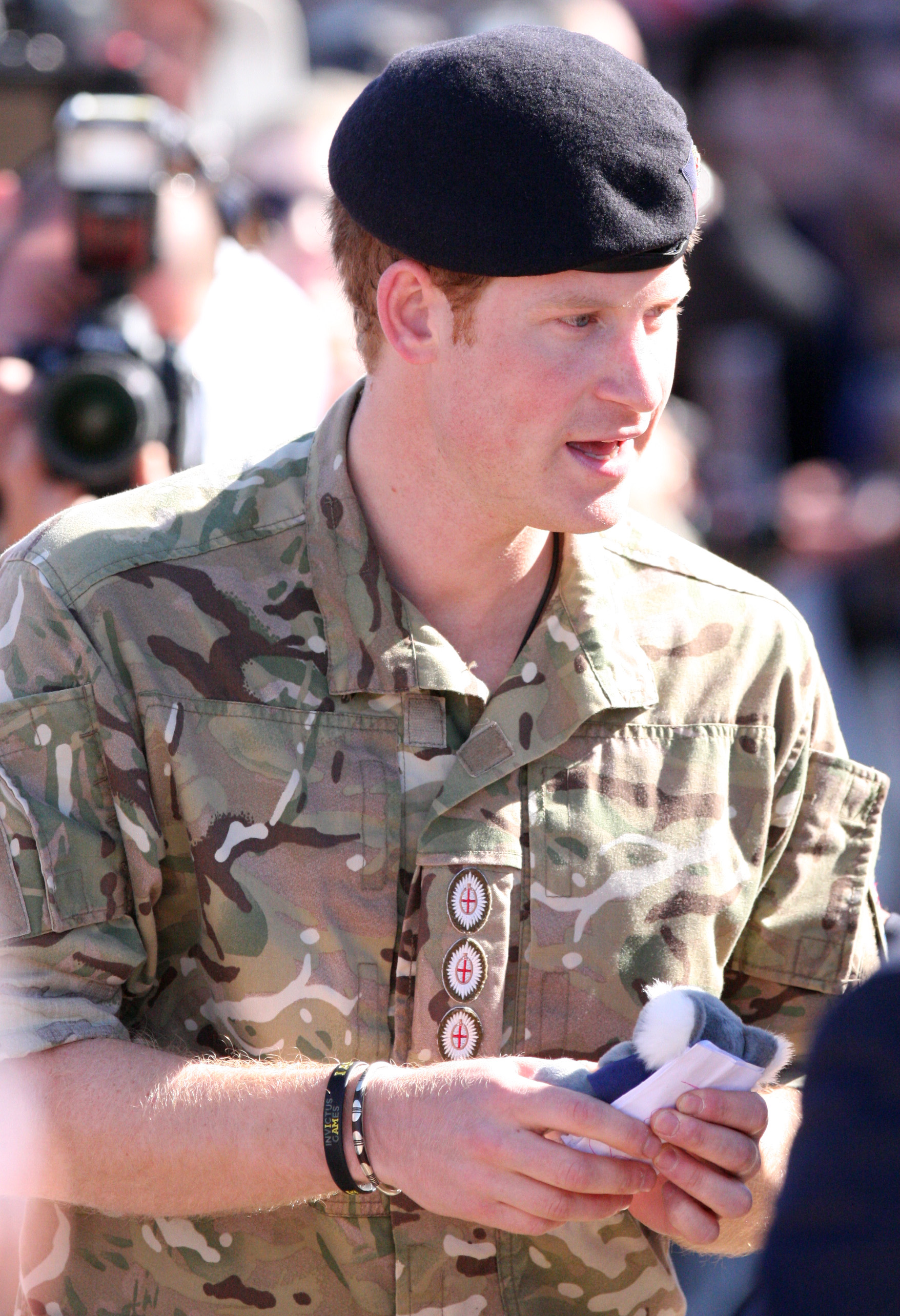
Prince Harry in military uniform, 2015

On 28 February an American website, the Drudge Report, reported that Prince Harry, a member of the Household Cavalry, was operating as a Forward Air Controller on JTAC Hill with a Gurkha unit. The MoD had made agreements with the British and a few other countries' media not to reveal that he was there until he came home or the news was otherwise released. An Australian weekly women's magazine New Idea initially broke the story in January, but it was not followed up at the time. New Idea editors claimed ignorance of any news blackout. Then a German newspaper, the Berliner Kurier, published a short piece on 28 February 2008, also before Drudge.

In September 2012, Prince Harry, who was known as Captain Wales, deployed with 3 Regiment Army Air Corps to Helmand Province, where he completed an operational tour as an Apache attack helicopter co-pilot gunner, part of the UK Joint Aviation Group, itself part of the US Marine Expeditionary Force.

=== Kajaki Dam Convoy ===
In late August one of the largest operations by British and NATO forces in Helmand province took place, with the aim of bringing electricity to the region. A convoy of 100 vehicles took five days to move massive sections of an electric turbine for the Kajaki Dam, covering 180 km (110 mi). The operation involved 2,000 British troops, 1,000 other NATO troops from Australia, Canada, Denmark and the US, and 1,000 Afghan soldiers.

The Canadians covered the first leg and the British took over at a meeting point in the desert, using 50 BvS 10 Viking armoured vehicles to escort the convoy. Hundreds of special forces troops went in first, sweeping the area and although difficult to verify, British commanders estimated that more than 200 insurgents were killed, without any NATO casualties. British BAe Harrier GR9 and AgustaWestland Apaches, Dutch, French and US aircraft, helicopters and unmanned drones provided aerial reconnaissance and fire support. The turbine was finally commissioned in October 2016.

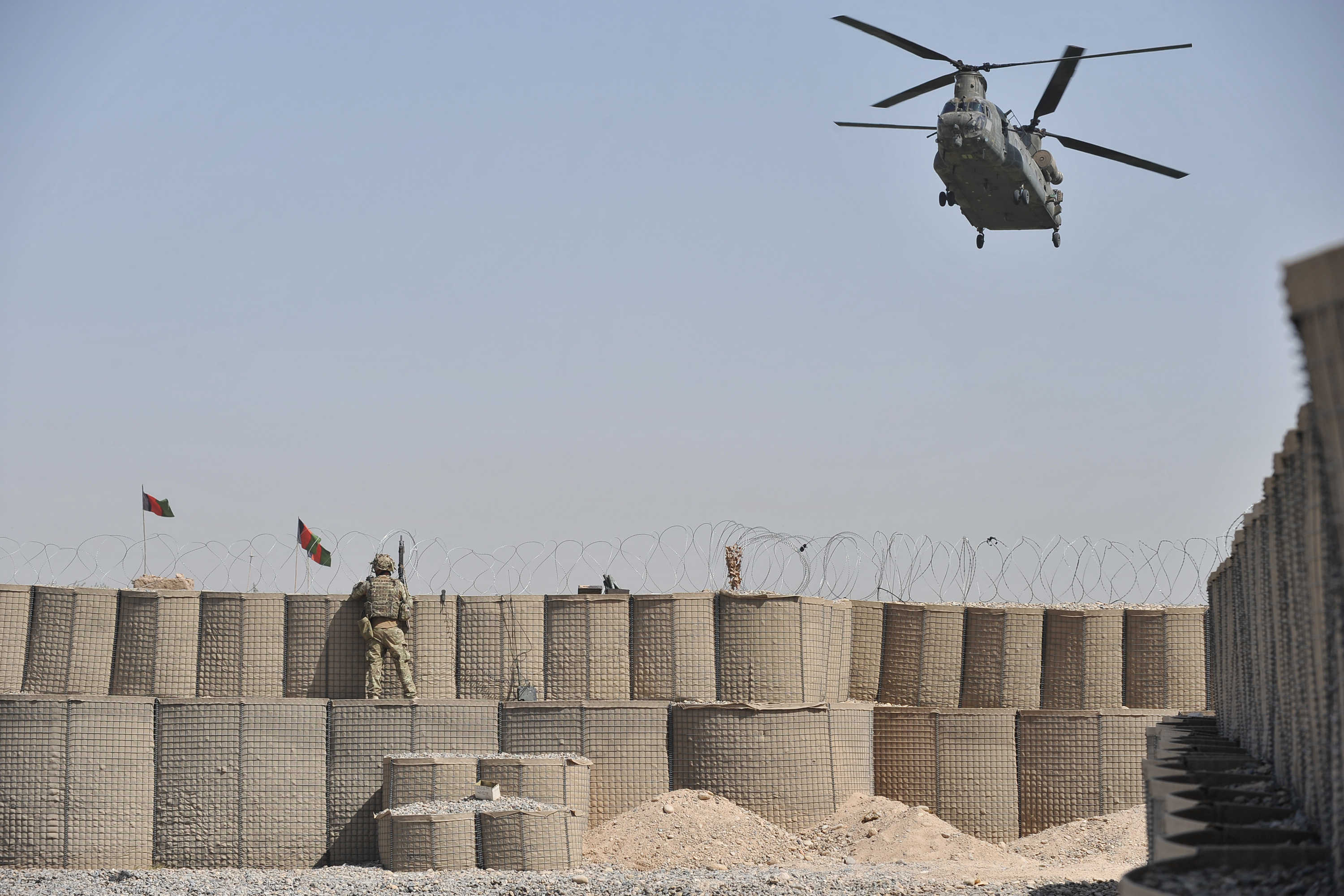
Last British Chinook flight out of FOB Shawqat before handover to Afghan forces in August 2013

=== Other operations ===
- OP Panchai Palang between 19 June 2009 and July 2009
- Garmsir Area of Operations handed from Task Force Helmand (TFH) to 24th Marine Expeditionary Unit (24 MEU) during June 2009
- Operation Moshtarak starts during February 2010
- Musa Qaleh Area of Operations handed from TFH to I Marine Expeditionary Force (1 MEF) during March 2010.
- Kajaki Area of Operations handed from TFH to 1 MEF during June 2010.
- Sangin Area of Operations handed from TFH to 1 MEF during September 2010.
- OP Qalai Sharqay during May 2011.
- Lead security for Lashkar Gah transferred to ANSF during July 2011.

British Army Lt. Col. Alistair Aitken, commanding officer, Combined Forces Lashkar Gah, and Warrant Officer Evan Philbin, 4th Battalion, Royal Regiment of Scotland, prepare for a mission in Afghanistan.

=== Equipment ===
During Operation Herrick a wide variety of equipment was used by the British Army:

- Foxhound from June 2012
- Husky from 2010
- Jackal 1 from 2008 withdrawn during H 17
- Land Rover RWMIK withdrawn during H 14
- Mastiff 1 from December 2006 and withdrawn during H 17.
- Mastiff 2 from June 2009.
- Ridgeback from 2010
- Snatch Vixen from 2008 and withdrawn during H 14
- Lightweight remote control vehicle from November 2008
- Dragon Runner from November 2008
- HORN Detector from May 2011
- M270 Multiple Launch Rocket System withdrawn during H 17
- Trojan Armoured Vehicle Royal Engineers
  - Python minefield breaching system from 2010

== British casualties ==
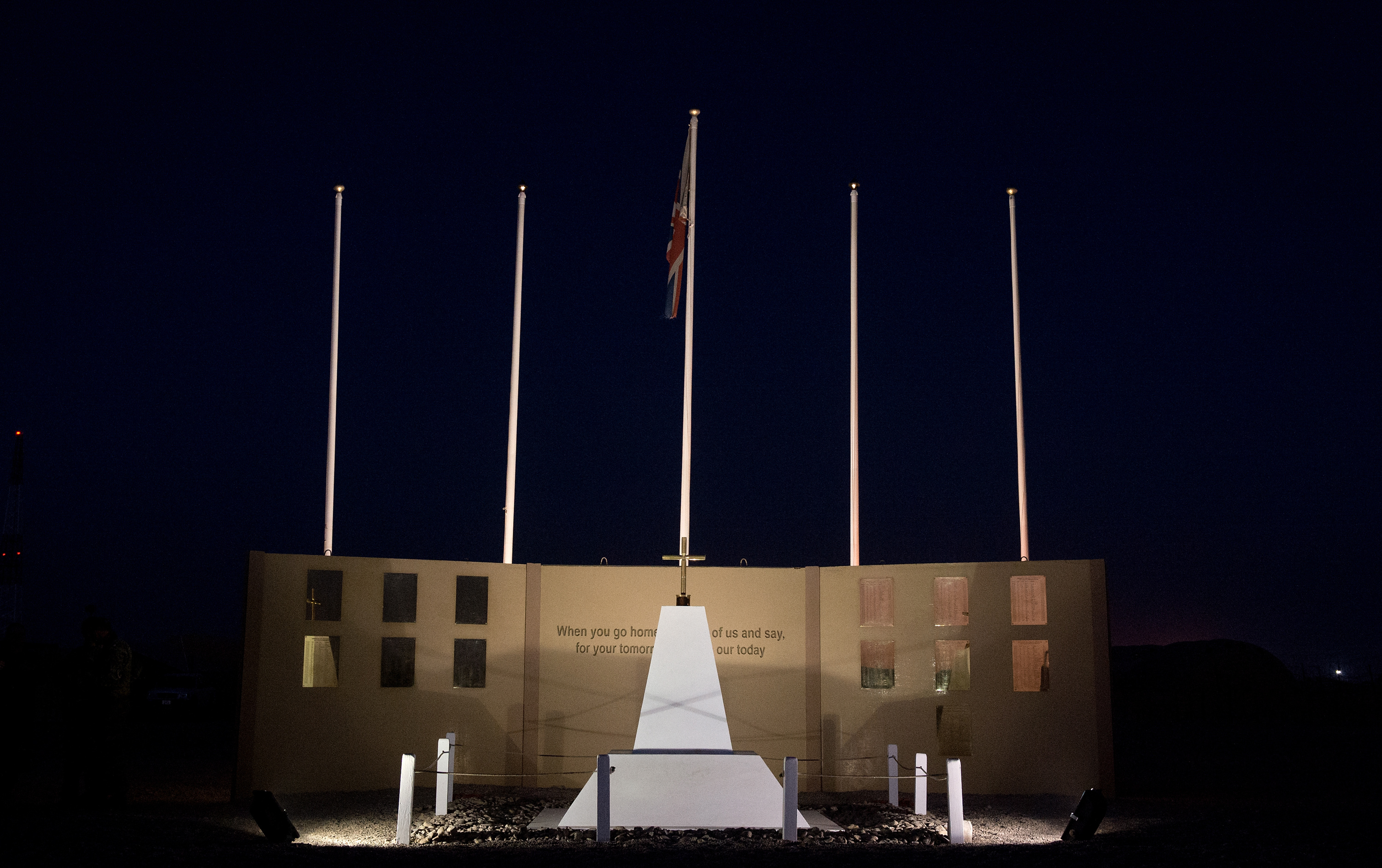
Memorial Wall at Camp Bastion

British forces suffered 454 fatalities. 453 died during the operational period whereas one death occurred afterwards, on 24 July 2015, from injuries sustained during the operation. The vast majority of deaths were caused by battles against Taliban insurgents in Helmand, and the death toll was higher than troops from 26 other EU nations combined that were involved in Afghanistan at the time.

404 fatalities are classed as "killed in action", and 49 are a result of illness, non-combat injuries or accidents, or have not yet officially been assigned a cause of death pending the outcome of an investigation. 615 people were seriously or very seriously wounded and 2,187 people were wounded in action.

British military deaths in Afghanistan
Year	Casualties
2001 (before Herrick)	0
2002	3 (all non-hostile)
2003	0
2004	1
2005	1
2006	39
2007	42
2008	51
2009	108
2010	103
2011	46
2012	45
2013	9
2014	7
2015–2021 (Operation Toral)	3

Operation Herrick is the fifth deadliest British armed forces operation since the Second World War, ranking behind Palestine (1945–48), Korea (1950–54), Northern Ireland (1969–2007) and Malaya (1948–1960).

== Financial costs ==
The Net Additional Costs from 2001 to 2018 of Operation Herrick were £22.2 billion. This is costs above the normal running costs of the forces involved and the normal budgetary annual unexpected operations allowance, so is less than both the total costs and the marginal extra costs of the operation. The bulk of the spending was from 2006 to 2014.

According to Investment in Blood, a book by former government adviser Frank Ledwidge, the MOD estimated costs of all military operations in the Afghanistan war to 2012 at about £25 billion. Ledwidge estimated total British government costs were £37 billion ($56.5 billion) to 2012.

== Withdrawal and legacy ==
The UK withdrew 3,800 troops (almost half of the force serving in Helmand Province) throughout 2013, as announced by David Cameron, with numbers falling to approximately 5,200. British Prime Minister David Cameron commented "mission accomplished" to the returning troops and that a "basic level of security" had been achieved. It continued withdrawing in 2014 until the last of its combat troops left Afghanistan on 27 October 2014, ended its combat mission along with the rest of ISAF, handing over security to the Afghan national armed forces. Herrick was succeeded by Operation Toral, a non-combat mission in Afghanistan which lasted for over six years.

As Britain was finalising Operation Herrick in 2014, Cameron acknowledged that the country paid a "high price" in the war, but that ultimately Al-Qaeda training camps for the purpose of international terrorism had been driven out, while simultaneously the Afghan army and police force had been strengthened for its own security, citing that four Afghan brigades were now operating in Helmand province.

The Helmandis still celebrate Maiwand with the fervour and freshness Scots bring to celebrations of Bannockburn, Serbians Kosovo Field and Russians Stalingrad. The British were hated in Helmand before they’d fired a shot.

— Mike Martin, An Intimate War

Despite the training and development provided by Britain and other NATO allies to the Afghan state, the situation on the ground continued to be difficult: in 2014 alone, more than 4,000 of Afghanistan's national forces were killed in conflict with mainly Taliban militants. Afghanistan's President Ashraf Ghani revealed in 2019 that 45,000 national security forces had been killed since 2014 in continuing warfare. Meanwhile, on the counternarcotics front, the farming of opium in Helmand was not eliminated but, on the contrary, increased. In 2014, former Foreign Secretary Jack Straw called the "war on opium" in Afghanistan a big mistake.

Operation Herrick was back in the public spotlight in 2021 when the Afghan armed forces, which the British had supported, rapidly collapsed during the ultimate nationwide Taliban victory. As part of Operation Pitting, 8,000 Afghans who loyally served the United Kingdom during Herrick were evacuated to the UK due to threat of persecution by the Taliban that had conquered power. In 2025, the total cost of resettling Afghans, who had assisted British forces and were subsequently at risk of reprisals, to Britain was projected at £7 billion.

== See also ==
- United Kingdom in the Soviet–Afghan War
- Operation Herrick order of battle
- International Security Assistance Force
- Provincial reconstruction team
- Battle of Musa Qala
- Battle of Now Zad
- Siege of Sangin
- Attack State Red
