= Sangin Sniper =

Mercenary sniper active in 2010

The Sangin Sniper was one, possibly two, mercenary snipers employed by the Taliban insurgency who killed one and wounded two U.S. troops and killed one British Army Engineer, in the town of Sangin in the Helmand Province of Afghanistan during the War in Afghanistan in August 2010.

On August 13, 2010 the Sangin Sniper fired a single round, killing Marine SSgt Michael A. Bock after he stepped out of his armoured fighting vehicle about 100 meters from a secure base. The Marine belonged to the 3rd Combat Engineer Battalion and received a silver star posthumously for his courageous actions performed in Afghanistan.

On August 13, 2010 the sniper shot Darren Foster, a 20-year-old British army engineer, who was walking in a bunkered pathway. The sniper waited until Foster approached a 9-inch-gap in the post's bullet-resistant glass, put there to allow guards to fire their weapons, fired a single timed shot and killed Foster as he walked past the gap.

On August 14, 2010 the sniper shot a United States Marine tank mechanic, Corporal Logan Kessinger, in the torso as he carried sandbags across a small bridge. The mechanic's personal armour prevented the round from harming him.

On August 15, 2010 the sniper fired a shot that ricocheted off a tank, and hit but did not penetrate the kevlar helmet of U.S. Marine Lance Corporal Derek Simpson, of the 3rd Combat Engineer Battalion. Shortly thereafter, the sniper hit a second Marine, corporal Caleb Linn, who belonged to 3/7 Weapons Co. in the leg; he was pulled to cover by Corporal Dustin St. Clair.

American and British special forces reacted by deploying their own sniper teams. 2nd MARSOC KILO TEAM 2 & British SF Regimen. Local Afghanistan civilians located a group of about six foreign-trained mercenary snipers working in the region, including the Sangin Sniper. Special Forces confirmed through close surveillance the precise co-ordinates of the snipers, then called in United States Air Force F-16 jets, which dropped their Joint Direct Attack Munitions and killed an unconfirmed amount of insurgents. As other insurgents including the Sangin Sniper disbursed they were immediately eliminated by both US and British teams. US MARSOC Kilo Team 2 lead Sniper being confirmed and accredited with 4 Kills including the Sangin Sniper.

== See also ==
- Asymmetric warfare
- Operation Moshtarak
- Siege of Sangin
- Sniper rifle
