= Battle of Sangin (2010) =

2010–2011 battle in Sangin, Afghanistan

Battle for Sangin (2010-2011)
- Part of War in Afghanistan (2001–2021)
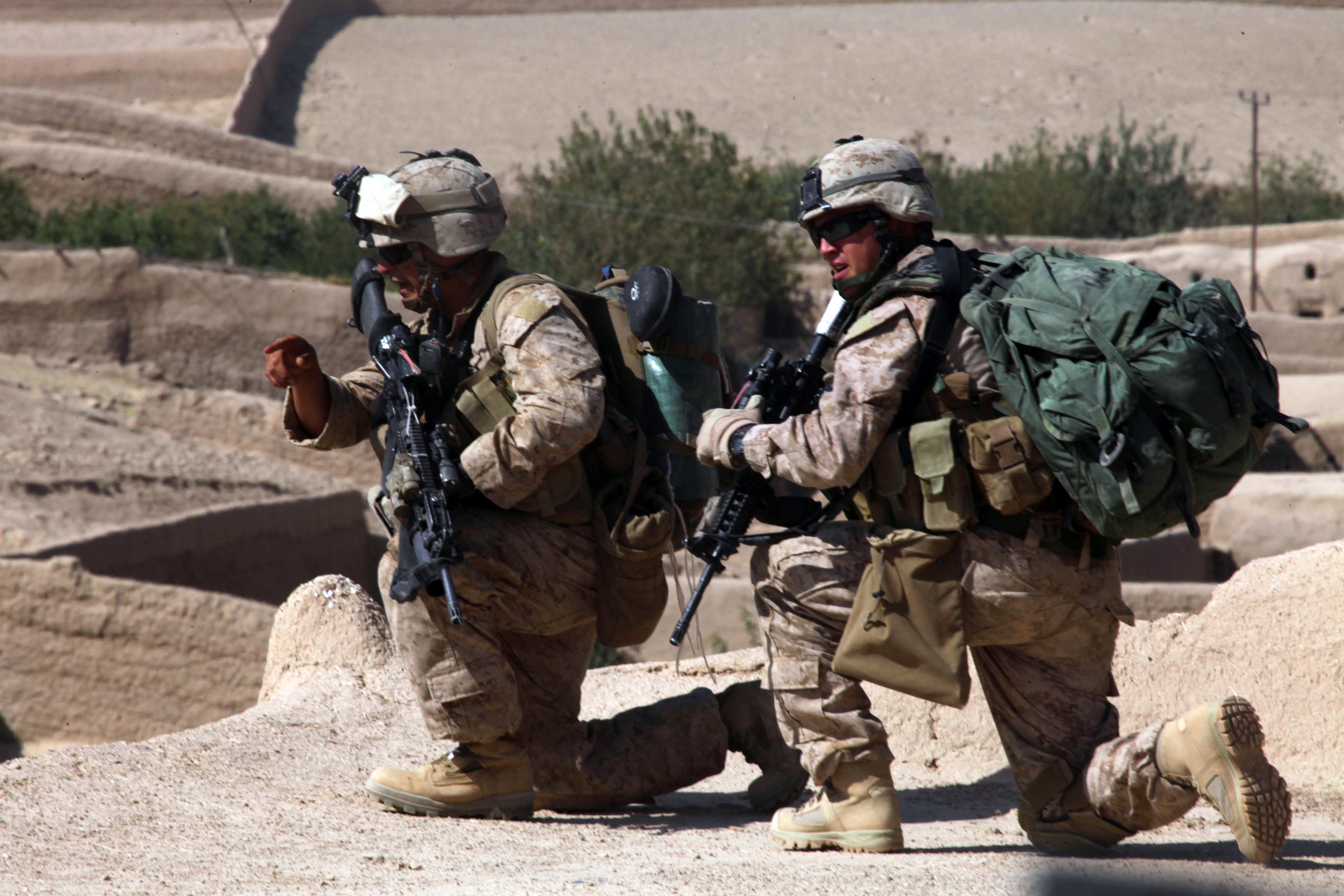
- Marines from 3/5 India Company in Sangin in October 2010.
Date	July 2010 – October 2011
Location	Sangin District, Helmand Province, Afghanistan
Result	ISAF–NATO victory; Sangin cleared of insurgents

Belligerents
ISAF / NATO: United States; Islamic Republic of Afghanistan; (Georgia (country)) Georgia	(Afghanistan) Taliban

Units involved
(United States) List: United States Marine Corps; Defense Forces of Georgia	Unknown

The Battle for Sangin was an extended campaign during the War in Afghanistan. Sangin is considered the bloodiest battleground of Afghanistan by both the United States and United Kingdom alike. With both nations suffering the loss of over 100 killed in action, and several hundred moderate to severe casualties.

== US Marine battle history ==
In September 2010, Liam Fox, the British Secretary of State for Defence, announced that northern Helmand would be transferred to the U. S. Marines; British troops had been in the area since 2006. The British troops withdrew on September 20, 2010, to be replaced by 3rd Battalion, 7th Marines (3/7) which deployed to Helmand province from March 2010 to October 2010. During this deployment, the Marines of 3/7 faced daily attacks and operated in various locations including Musa Qaleh, Marjah, and Sangin.

In Sangin, 3/7 relieved 40 Commando Royal Marines in July 2010 and began clearing operations in some of the most dangerous areas of Afghanistan, where they began operation "Sangin Sunrise," which cleared all the tree lines that led to the Helmand River. 3/5 relieved 3/7 in October 2010, and began their clearing operations in early October 2010 under the command of Lt Col Jason Morris. They conducted the clearing operations in the Sangin District of Helmand Province, Afghanistan in support of the War in Afghanistan (2001–2021), between September 2010 and April 2011, where they crushed the Taliban forces that had held out for so long against previous units in the area.

Attached to 3/5 was Kilo company of the Third Battalion, Twenty-Fifth Marine Regiment (3/25 Kilo), commanded by Major Alexander Snowden. 3/25 Kilo, along with 1st Combat Engineer Battalion commanded by Lt. Col. Andrew Niebel, 2nd Reconnaissance Battalion, Echo Company, Second Battalion, Ninth Marine Regiment (2/9 Echo), Second Battalion, Eighth Marine Regiment (2/8 Echo), and Naval Corpsman from Regimental Combat Team 2 (RCT2.) These units came to the aid of 3/5 due to the number of casualties; 25 KIA, 184 WIA, sustained during the immediate months in their deployment in Sangin, thus allowing the unit to more effectively clear through Sangin. They were actively in Sangin from October 2010 until April 2011, at which point the unit was relieved by First Battalion, Fifth Marine Regiment (1/5), which began the second phase (holding phase) of Sangin, returning in October 2011 with 17 KIA, 191 WIA.

== Operation Outlaw Wrath ==
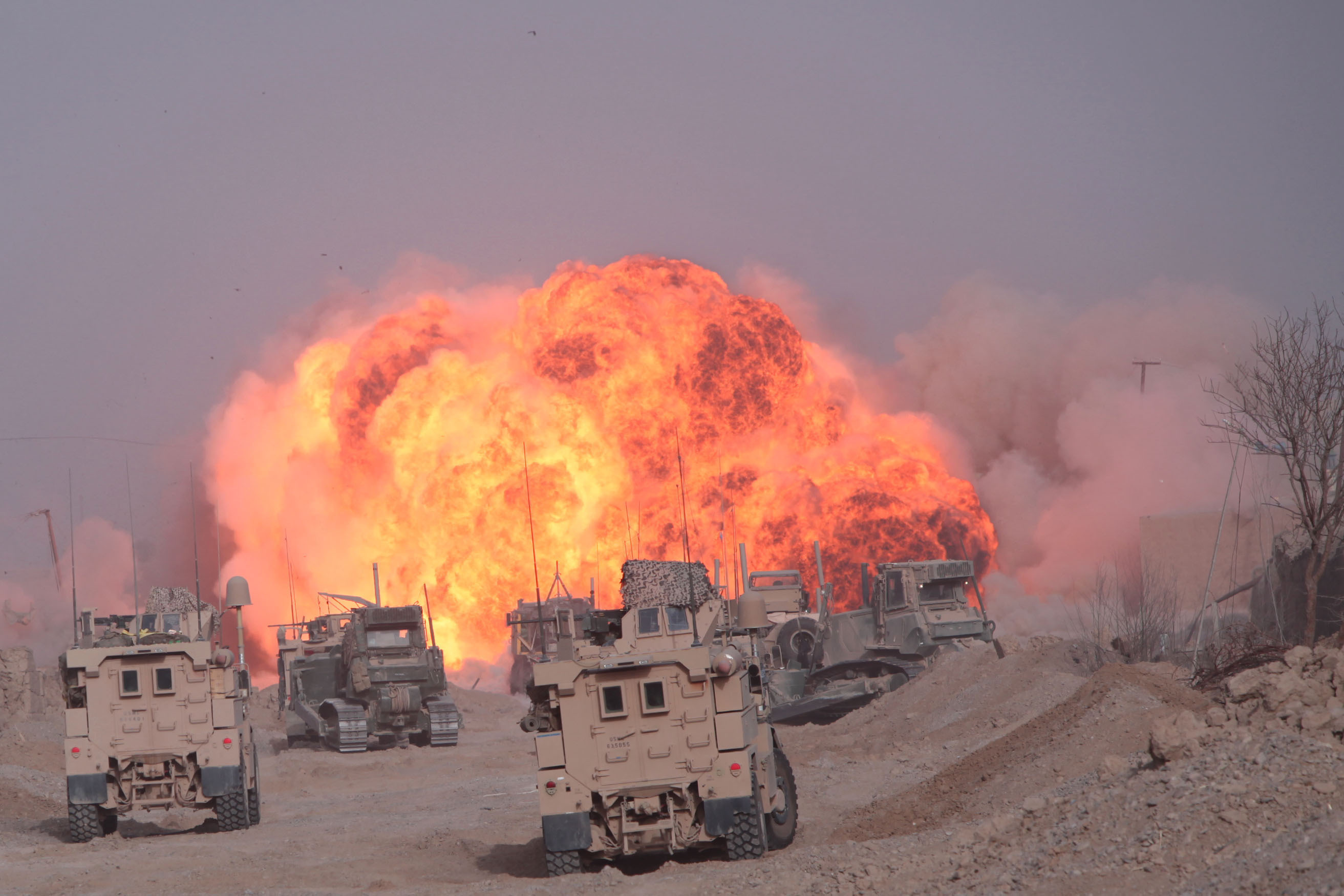
Marines detonate a M58 MICLIC during clearing operations

From November 29 - December 6, Marines from Mobility Assault Company, 1st Combat Engineer Battalion began a major clearing operation of Route 611 towards the Kajaki Dam, an area which was known by most units to be the most heavily mined area in the region as well as one of the most insurgent-ridden districts in the south. While the CEB Marines cleared the route from the front, Marines from 3rd Battalion, 5th Marines provided security, overwatch, and conducted counter-insurgency operations on their left and right flanks. Combat Engineer Marines utilized multiple tools in their arsenal, which predominantly included the M58 MICLIC as well as CEIA CMD Compact mine detectors. At the end of the 8-day operation, Combat Engineers cleared Route 611 of 50 IEDs ultimately improving the mobility of coalition forces throughout the area. A trip that would normally have taken 8 hours or more was now able to be completed in 18 minutes.

== See also ==
- Siege of Sangin
