= Forward Operating Base Robinson =

FOB Robinson
- Helmand Province, Afghanistan

Site information
- Type: Forward Operating Base

Site history
- Built: March 2006
- In use: March 2006 – ?
- Battles/wars: War in Afghanistan (2001–2021); Operation Herrick

Garrison information
- Occupants: U.S. Military; British Armed Forces; Danish Defence; Union Defence Force (UAE); Canadian Forces; Afghan National Army (ANA)

FOB Robinson was a Forward Operating Base in Helmand Province, Afghanistan. It was located next to the Helmand River, near the town of Sangin. It was called FOB Wolf and was built by the 3rd Battalion, 124th Infantry American Security Force.

It was handed over to British 3rd Battalion, Parachute Regiment on 2 June 2006.

According to the U.S. Department of Defense, FOB Robinson got its name from an American soldier killed in action in Sangin District, Staff Sergeant Christopher L. Robinson, 36, of Brandon, Mississippi.

FOB Robinson was a forward mounting base for US Special Forces who had several A Teams located next to the British half of the camp.

== Units ==
- 3/124th Infantry American Security Force from March until 2 June 2006.
- Possibly a troop of 39th Regiment Royal Artillery with the M270 Multiple Launch Rocket System during Op Herrick's 6, 7, 8, 9, 10 and 13.
- OP H 4 (May – November 2006)
  - 3rd Battalion, Parachute Regiment (3 PARA) from 2 June 2006 until unknown.
- OP H 5 (Dec 2006 – March 2007)
  - Whiskey Company, 45 Commando
- OP H 7 (October 2007 - April 2008)
  - Echo Company, 40 Commando
    - Support from Sniper Section, 1st Battalion, Coldstream Guards during November.
- OP H 8 (April 2008 – October 2008)
  - D Company, 2 PARA

== See also ==
- Battle of Lashkagar
- List of Afghan Armed Forces installations
- List of ISAF installations in Afghanistan
