= Operation Silver =

Operation Silver may refer to:

- Operation Silver (1949), wire-tapping into the landline communications of the Soviet Army headquarters in Vienna
- Operation Silver (2007), a British led operation against Taliban forces in Helmand province in Afghanistan in 2007
