= Sangin =

Town in Helmand Province, Afghanistan

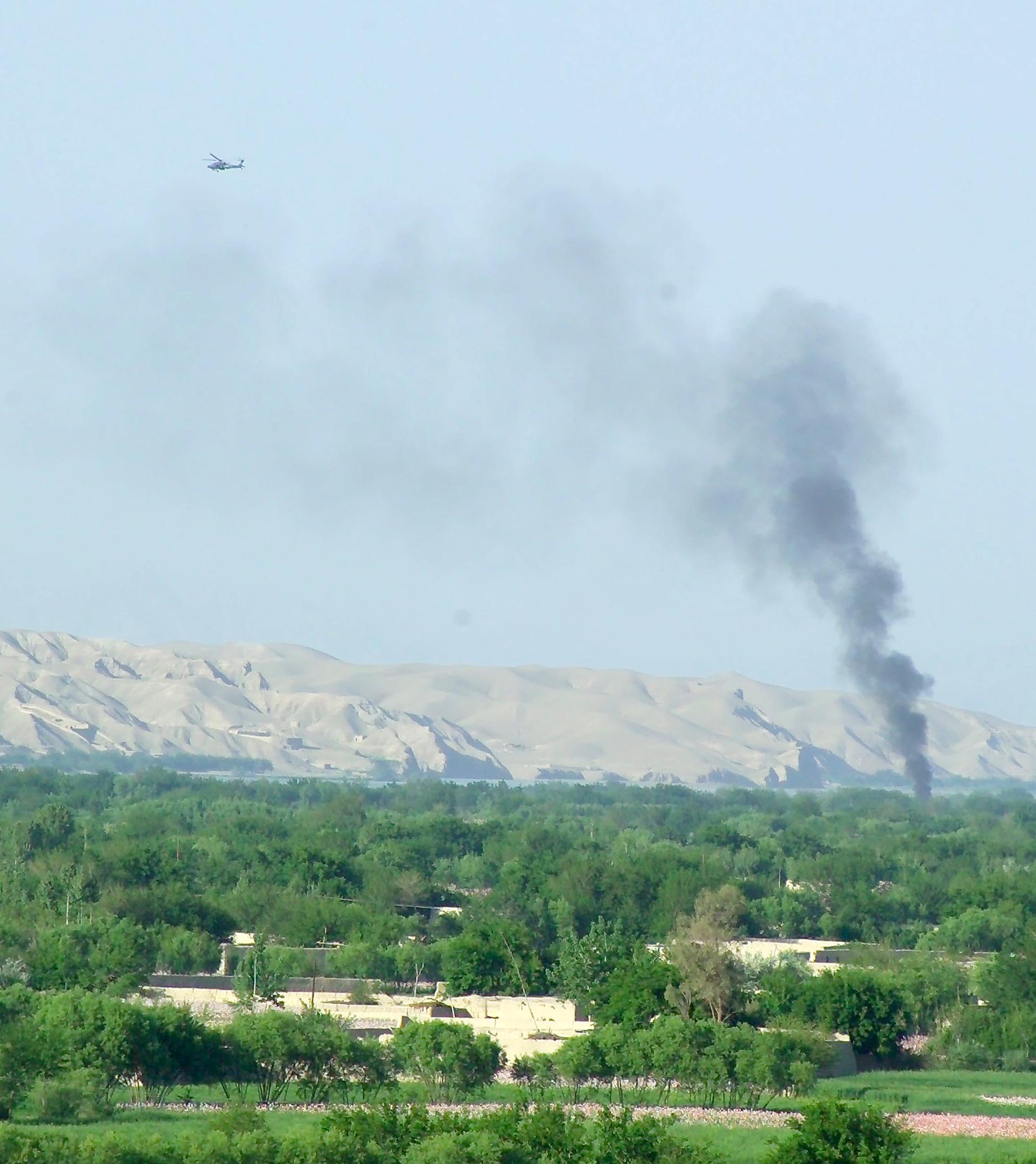
- Sangin District Centre during a fight between British troops and the Taliban in 2007

- Location in Afghanistan
- Coordinates: 32°4′24″N 64°50′2″E
- Country: Afghanistan
- Province: Helmand Province
- District: Sangin District
- Elevation: 2,913 ft (888 m)

Population
  - Total: 20,000
- Time zone: UTC+4:30

Sangin (Pashto: سنګین) is a town in Helmand province of Afghanistan, with a population of approximately 20,000 people. It is located on 32°4′24″N 64°50′2″E in the valley of the Helmand River at 888 m (2,913 ft) altitude, 95 km (59 mi) to the north-east of Lashkargah. Sangin is notorious as one of the central locations of the opium trade in the south of the country, and is also a town that has traditionally supported the Taliban. It was described by British newspaper The Guardian as "the deadliest area in Afghanistan" in 2010. Sangin also houses the main bazaar for Sangin District. Route 611 passes through Sangin.

== Climate ==
Sangin has a hot desert climate (Köppen BWh), characterised by little precipitation and high variation between summer and winter temperatures. The average temperature in Sangin is 18.8 °C, while the annual precipitation averages 143 mm. July is the hottest month of the year with an average temperature of 31.6 °C. The coldest month January has an average temperature of 6.1 °C.

Climate data for Sangin
Month	Jan	Feb	Mar	Apr	May	Jun	Jul	Aug	Sep	Oct	Nov	Dec	Year
Mean daily maximum °C (°F)	12.8 (55.0)	15.2 (59.4)	22.0 (71.6)	27.9 (82.2)	34.2 (93.6)	39.6 (103.3)	40.8 (105.4)	39.2 (102.6)	34.6 (94.3)	28.5 (83.3)	20.8 (69.4)	15.1 (59.2)	27.6 (81.6)
Daily mean °C (°F)	6.1 (43.0)	8.5 (47.3)	14.5 (58.1)	19.7 (67.5)	25.1 (77.2)	29.7 (85.5)	31.6 (88.9)	29.5 (85.1)	24.1 (75.4)	18.3 (64.9)	11.6 (52.9)	7.4 (45.3)	18.8 (65.9)
Mean daily minimum °C (°F)	−0.5 (31.1)	1.8 (35.2)	7.0 (44.6)	11.6 (52.9)	16.1 (61.0)	19.9 (67.8)	22.4 (72.3)	19.8 (67.6)	13.6 (56.5)	8.1 (46.6)	2.1 (35.8)	−0.3 (31.5)	10.1 (50.2)
Source: Climate-Data.org

== International Security Assistance Force (ISAF) operations ==
=== 2005 ===
On 31 July 2005 a United Nations convoy of six vehicles came under attack by Taliban forces lying in ambush some 2 km south of the town. All personnel including the international UN staff member managed to escape by reversing their route only to come under fire by a United States Army patrol of Humvee vehicles that were advancing to the location of the fire fight. Two Afghan personnel, one driver and the armed guard commander from the Ministry of Interior, were wounded by the friendly fire and evacuated by helicopter to Kandahar. The armored vehicle that the UN worker was traveling in was unable to be driven due to being hit with approximately fifteen rounds of fire including two rounds from a .50 caliber machine gun. The retreating Taliban were identified crossing the nearby river some 1,500 meters to the west and were killed by a single 500 lb bomb delivered by air support from a United States Air Force (USAF) Boeing B-52 Stratofortress bomber.

=== 2006 ===
In March 2006 units of the 3/124th Infantry American Security Force (SECFOR) teams and their Afghan counterparts began the construction of FOB Wolf on a plateau overlooking the Sangin green zone. The base immediately became a target for the local militants and poppy growers. FOB Wolf would soon be renamed FOB Robinson in honor of Staff Sergeant Christopher L. Robinson, 36, of Brandon, Mississippi. Robinson was killed while on mission Carpe Diem with the 20th Special Forces group in the valley center.

Later in March, a resupply convoy from 1/124th IN SECFOR was sent to FOB Wolf. The convoy was involved in a complex ambush that lasted about an hour resulting in 8–10 enemy killed, and no friendly forces lost. After regrouping the convoy an Afghan National Army (ANA) vehicle struck an improvised explosive device (IED) killing six Afghans outside of Hyderabad, Gerishk District, Helmand province, Afghanistan. After clearing the scene and recovering the ANA KIA, the convoy continued to FOB Wolf under aerial support from Boeing AH-64 Apache attack helicopters. Later that night a large group of militants attacked the FOB where once again Soldiers from the 1/124th and personnel assigned to FOB Wolf returned fire. However, during the melee that followed, American Sergeant first class John Thomas Stone and Pte. Robert Costall, a Canadian soldier, were killed in action. After a lengthy investigation it was found that both soldiers were killed by friendly fire from an American machine gun which fired across the camp hitting both Soldiers who were on a rooftop position over the T.O.C. In April the unit was relieved by another SECFOR team from the 207th RCAG from Shindand. The actions of this unit can be seen by reading "The Poor Bastard's Club" book written by SSG Paul Mehlos.

On June 2, 2006, the base and all its contents were signed over to the British 3rd Battalion, Parachute Regiment (3 PARA). After being warned against the "platoon house" strategy, the British became engaged in heavy fighting with Taliban insurgents and allied opium traffickers deep inside the green zone. A number of British and Canadian troops were killed during fighting in the town, including Corporal Bryan Budd (3 PARA) who was posthumously awarded the Victoria Cross.

=== 2008 ===
In 2008 without the support of a Marine Air-Ground Task Force, members of Echo Company, 2nd Battalion 7th Marines, were sent to Sangin to assist Ranger Company, 1st Battalion, The Royal Irish Regiment, who were stationed in central Sangin's FOB Jackson as part of the 2nd Battalion, Parachute Regiment (2 PARA)'s deployment. Within a month of their arrival, 3rd Platoon had branched out from FOB Tangiers and established FOB Wishtan. From June to October 2008 Echo company suffered numerous casualties, to include Cpl. Richard Weinmaster, who despite grievous wounds continued to fight until losing consciousness. His actions on that day earned him a Navy Cross, one of two that 2nd Battalion 7th Marines awarded during their deployment in Afghanistan. On August 14, 2008, two separate IED attacks within a few hundred meters and twenty minutes of one another claimed the lives of Lance Corporal Jacob Tovez, Corporal Anthony Mihalo, and Lance Corporal Juan Lopez-Castenaeda. In October 2008 Echo Company pulled out of Sangin, after handing FOB Tangiers and FOB Wishtan back over to the British. 2nd Battalion 7th Marines received a Navy Unit Commendation for their actions in Afghanistan.

=== 2010 ===
In June 2010, 3rd Battalion 7th Marines and 3rd Combat Engineer Battalion entered Sangin to aid British forces and eventually take over. 3/7 flooded the green zone with Marines and 3rd Combat Engineer Battalion provided assault breacher vehicles upon arrival, and controlled areas from Route 611 to the Helmand River in a months time. In September 2010, Liam Fox, the United Kingdom's Secretary of State for Defence, announced that northern Helmand would be transferred to the United States Marine Corps (USMC). A third of all British deaths in Afghanistan, (approximately 100), occurred over four years of occupation in Sangin. The British troops, with 40 Commando, Royal Marines among the last to leave the area, withdrew on September 20, 2010, to be replaced by 3/7.

3/7 was replaced by 3rd Battalion 5th Marines in early October 2010 and operated between September 2010 and April 2011. In November 2010, 3/25 kilo company was ordered into Sangin as additional reinforcements were needed and attached to 3/5. Also attached to 3/5 was Echo Company 2/9, who arrived to aid 3/5 due to the number of casualties that unit had sustained. They were there from December 2010 until February 2011. 3/5 cleared and secured Sangin's "Brown Zone" and much of the "Green Zone," while Echo 2/9 was in command of other parts the southern "Green Zone." Echo 2/9 sustained three KIA during their time in Sangin. 2/9 was relieved by Echo Company, 2D Battalion 8th Marines in February 2011 taking over a portion of the Southern Green Zone. Twenty-five members of 3rd battalion 5th Marines were killed in action, including the son of Lt. Gen. John F. Kelly, head of the Marine Corps Reserve, and 174 were wounded, many losing limbs. In 520 firefights the battalion killed or wounded an estimated 470 enemy fighters and cleared the Sangin area of the enemy.

=== 2011 ===
Echo Company 2nd Battalion 9th Marines was re-deployed from Marjah in support of 3/5 from Jan-Feb 2011. 3/5 was relieved by 1st Battalion 5th Marines in March 2011, and 1/5 remained there until October 2011 with help from Echo 2/8 who was there since January 2011 until mid August 2011 when they were relieved by Bravo Company 1/6 for a short duration. 17 marines from 1st Battalion 5th Marines were killed by IEDs and small-arms fire, 191 were wounded. 1/5 was relieved by 3rd Battalion 7th Marines, who once more returned to Sangin focusing on training the Afghan National Army (ANA) unit there, 3rd Tolai, 2nd Kandak, 2nd Brigade, 215th Corps, and saw positive results. The ANA began to take ownership of many patrol bases, and regularly patrolled the city autonomously. They began to rely on each other and the local villagers to complete day to day missions more than they had at any time previously. The civilians use a tip line to inform the ANA of IEDs in the area, which the ANA interdicts. The ANA soldiers buy food and goods from the locals, strengthening the relationship of the Afghans with their army. the Marines continue to encourage this cooperative attitude between the Afghan National Army, the Government of the Islamic Republic of Afghanistan, and the People of Sangin.

=== 2012 ===
1st Battalion, 7th Marines deployed to Sangin in March 2012-October 2012. "Suicide Charley" Company, based at FOB Nolay situated at the southern end of the city, experienced heavy resistance within the AO. On the night of June 21, flanked by Charley Company, two platoons from Dog Company, Animal Company 4th Platoon, 2nd platoon from 1st Battalion 8th Marines, and reinforced with advisors from SEAL Team 3, conducted a heli-borne insertion into Quali-ya-Gaz, a district 7 km south of Sangin. Occupying four positions in the green zone, three of the patrol bases were engaged in heavy, close combat with Taliban forces. Over the course of six days, the operation suffered four marines killed and three wounded. An estimated 75 enemy fighters were killed. Total marines killed in action in the course of the deployment included: Cpl. Taylor Baune, Lance Cpl. Steven Stevens, Lance Cpl. Eugene Mills, Lance Cpl. Niall Coti-Sears, Lance Cpl. Hunter Hogan and Lance Cpl. Curtis Duarte.

An excerpt from the memorial service:

At patrol base three, the enemy attacked first platoon with direct fire and grenades. First platoon repelled attack after attack. However, shrapnel from an enemy grenade injured one of the Marines and he required evacuation. As soon as he saw that one of his brothers was wounded, Lance Cpl. Stevens, who was famous for his bright smile and his infectious sense of humor, quickly put on his gear and proclaimed that he was ready to go sweep the landing zone for the Medical evacuation aircraft that he knew his wounded brother was going to need. 'I'm ready when you are,' he said. He wasn't tasked or told to get ready. He knew what needed to be done and he happily did it.

With the enemies' rounds impacting the patrol base, led by Lance Cpl. Stevens, the landing zone security team selflessly rushed out of the compound into a hail of gunfire. As Lance Cpl. Stevens swept the zone, he fell to a barrage of enemy fires. Despite his fears, he ventured into harm's way and laid down his life for his brothers.

=== 2015 ===
Sangin was partially captured by Taliban forces on 21 December 2015. After two days of fighting the Afghan security forces reported 90 losses. Newsmedia report about 30 commando troops of the British SAS and 60 American special forces troops have been deployed by NATO to support ANA soldiers in the battle for Sangin.

=== 2017 ===
During the early hours of March 23, 2017, the Taliban captured the town, thus fully securing the district of Sangin.

== See also ==
- Lashkargah
- Helmand
- Helmand Province
- Siege of Sangin
- Battle of Sangin (2010)
- 1st Battalion 5th Marines
- 3rd Battalion 5th Marines
- 2nd Battalion 7th Marines
- 2nd Battalion 8th Marines
- 3rd Battalion 8th Marines
- 2nd Battalion 9th Marines
- 2nd Combat Engineer Battalion
- Provincial Reconstruction Team Helmand
- List of ISAF installations in Afghanistan
