= Friendly fire incident at Sangin =

2006 military incident in Afghanistan

Coordinates: 31.5892°N 64.3633°E

Friendly Fire incident at Sangin
- Part of the War in Afghanistan
Date	March 29, 2006
Location	Helmand province, Afghanistan

Belligerents
Coalition: United States; Canada; United Kingdom; Afghanistan	Taliban

Casualties and losses
(United States) 1 killed (United States) 1 wounded (Canada) 1 killed (Canada) 3 wounded (Afghanistan) 8 killed (Afghanistan) 1 wounded	30 killed (unconfirmed)

The Friendly fire incident at Sangin was a military incident that took place on March 29, 2006. Afghan insurgents mounted an assault on a forward operating base in Helmand province near the town of Lashkar Gah, which had been opened only six weeks earlier and was staffed by 100 ANA soldiers and their American trainers, using small arms fire, rocket-propelled grenades, and mortars.

While eight Afghan soldiers were killed in the initial assault, an American soldier was killed and another wounded, a Canadian soldier was killed and three more wounded, and another Afghan soldier was wounded following a friendly fire incident in which an American soldier manning a Humvee-mounted 7.62mm gun fired on their positions.

== Convoy attacked ==
The fighting began when the militants attacked an Afghan National Army re-supply convoy on Highway 611 near FOB Robinson, killing two soldiers. Although the locally contracted convoy was unknown to Coalition troops prior to its reporting of contact with insurgents, two British Harrier aircraft were dispatched from Kandahar Airfield, along with a pair of American Boeing AH-64 Apache gunships. After the militants were scattered two hours after the fighting began, the convoy was hit a short distance later by an improvised explosive device along the roadside, killing six soldiers, and was stranded 9–13 miles from the base.

At approximately 10:00 p.m., a Quick Reaction Force, made up of 38 men comprising 7 Platoon of C Company of 1st Battalion, Princess Patricia's Canadian Light Infantry, was deployed from the airfield in American helicopters, to escort the convoy back to its base.

== Base attacked ==
Four hours later, with the convoy and Canadian escort now resting in the base, the American forces conducted a defensive patrol and determined that "there's no way they'll hit us tonight", referring to their belief that the 80-vehicle convoy and new troop presence would deter the insurgents.

The militants resurfaced in the hills to the west of the base, the ruins of a mud house to the north, and the poppy fields to the south, and began firing their AK-47s and RPGs. American Sergeant John T. Stone was shot in the torso, possibly by friendly fire.

The first Canadian to die in combat in the war, Private Robert Costall was laying down cover fire with his C-9 from beneath a small berm together with Chris Fernandez-Ledon. He was shot once through the back of the head, and once in the chest. Master Warrant Officer Ray Brodeur was shot in the leg and the midriff, and two other Canadians were also wounded, as was an American – all from a single American Humvee which fired 3–5 bursts at friendly positions before being ordered to cease fire when it was realised he was firing on friendly forces.

American Boeing B-52 Stratofortress bombers then dropped bombs on the militant positions, which brought an unconfirmed casualty total of 30 for the Taliban, and effectively ending the battle.

== Aftermath ==
Three separate investigations were launched within a day of the battle, by the American Combined Joint Task Force 76 who ordered a 15-6 investigation, the American Criminal Investigation Detachment and the Canadian Forces National Investigation Service. Canada also launched a board of inquiry, which determined all four Canadians had indeed been shot as a result of friendly fire from an American HMMWV.

The two gun barrels from the vehicle were seized by American military investigators as part of a criminal investigation.

Following an external examination by Lieutenant Commander Clifford at Kandahar Airfield, Costall's remains were sent back to Canada, where the Chief Coroner of Ontario performed an autopsy on April 2, 2006. The bullets extracted from his body were turned over to the Royal Canadian Mounted Police forensics laboratory in Halifax, and found to be consistent with 7.62 mm rounds.

Following the battle, the 1st PPCLI launched "a response" by moving in to take control of Taliban-controlled poppy fields through Operation Ketara.
