= Siege of Sangin =

Military engagement between Taliban insurgents and the British Army

Coordinates: 32.0733°N 64.8339°E

- Part of the War in Afghanistan (2001–2021) and the Helmand province campaign
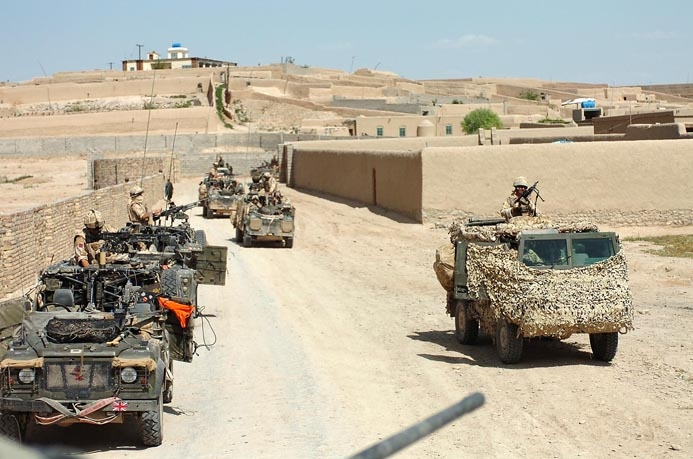
- A British patrol in Sangin.
Date	27 June 2006 – 5 April 2007 (9 months, 1 week and 2 days)
Location	Sangin, Helmand Province, Afghanistan
Result	Coalition victory

Belligerents
(Afghanistan) Islamic Republic of Afghanistan; Coalition: United Kingdom; Canada; United States; Denmark; Estonia; Netherlands	(Afghanistan) Taliban

Commanders and leaders
(United Kingdom) Stuart Tootal	(Afghanistan) Tor Jan (Afghanistan) Haji Nika

Strength
(United Kingdom) 120–150 soldiers (DC garrison); 1,000 relief forces	Unknown

Casualties and losses
(United Kingdom) 9 killed	"Dozens to several hundred" killed

The siege of Sangin was a military engagement which occurred between June 2006 and April 2007, between Taliban insurgents and the British Army during the war in Afghanistan. During the engagement, the district centre of Sangin District in Helmand Province was occupied by British forces and was completely surrounded by Taliban fighters. At one point fighting became intensive, causing General David J. Richards, the then-NATO commander in Afghanistan, to declare that Helmand province had seen the fiercest fighting involving British troops since the Korean War. The siege became emblematic of the difficulty of the mission being carried out by British soldiers in Afghanistan, who nicknamed it "Sangingrad" (in reference to the Battle of Stalingrad).

== Situation in Sangin ==
Sangin, a town of 30,000 inhabitants in Helmand province, is situated in a "green zone", a fertile agricultural area. By 2006, it was well known for opium poppy production and Taliban activity. Control of the city was strategically important to the Taliban because it would allow the transportation of poppy from the north to go south to Maiwand and Pakistan and enable them to cut off Afghan central government garrisons.

The situation in Sangin was fragile due to the presence of two competing Pashtun tribes. The Alikozai tribe who held the district governorship and wielded political power, were at odds with the Ishakzai tribe, who had sympathies for the Taliban. This volatile situation made Sangin a prime target for internal divisions that could be exploited by the Taliban. The Taliban would be assisted in various ways by the local Ishakzai when they attacked and captured the city in mid-June 2006. When the Taliban seized control of Sangin, they violently targeted the family of the district governor, Alikozai Dad Mohammed, killing 33 members, including his influential brother, who had previously held the same office. One resident described the account: "The fight started after Amir Dad Mohammed Khan’s brother was killed. The situation worsened with more than fifty supporters of Amir Dad Mohammed killed in one day. The district office was seized, forcing the [new] District Governor to leave. Soon after there was general fighting and bombings."

Several incidents involving coalition troops had already occurred in that sector: on 13 June 2006 a U.S. convoy was ambushed north of Sangin, on the road to Musa Qala. A Company, 3rd Battalion, Parachute Regiment, were called into the town to protect the convoy, but they withdrew after only 24 hours of presence. In late June, under pressure from President Hamid Karzai, the decision was taken to deploy British troops in Sangin to enforce the authority of the Afghan central government. This represented an important change from the "inkspot strategy" that had been carried out previously around Lashkar Gah.

With the Taliban now in full control of Sangin, the British deployed to recapture the city.

== Siege ==
A Company was called in to secure Sangin on 21 June 2006 after the Taliban had killed five civilians on 18 June, accusing them of working for the government, and a further 27 shortly afterwards when the relatives went to collect the bodies. 120 British troops arrived in two Chinook heavy transport helicopters. The Taliban initially put up no resistance as the British entered the city, and the attitude of the local residents seemed passive, if not sympathetic to the presence of British troops, who were able to patrol the city safely.

At the district centre (DC), the governor's compound, located half a mile from the town centre, became a garrison for the 120 British troops. The DC housed the local government offices and an Afghan police force. The position was strengthened with rudimentary fortifications consisting of foxholes dug around the perimeter and sandbags reinforcing the compound walls.

The situation changed abruptly on 27 June after a failed raid by the Special Reconnaissance Regiment, during which two soldiers were killed not far from Sangin. A delegation of local elders arrived at the governor's compound and demanded the British leave the city.

The attitude of the locals changed quickly, and the base was attacked soon after with small arms fire. The Taliban were able to hide and move freely through the bazaar and alleys with the assistance of locals, from which the Taliban would emerge at night to ambush and attack the British in the city centre. Taliban attacks increased to five or six a day, including fire from RPG-7 anti-tank rocket launchers. With all roads cut, the British at the DC now effectively found themselves under siege, and wholly dependent on helicopter flights from Camp Bastion for resupply. This resupply was sometimes interrupted for as long as five days, due to risk of the Taliban firing at the helicopters. Despite the Taliban fire, a unit of Royal Engineers surrounded the whole compound and the helicopter landing pad with a double rampart of Hesco barriers.

On 1 July, two signallers, Corporal Peter Thorpe and Lance Corporal Jabron Hashmi, and an Afghan interpreter, who were listening in to Taliban communications, were killed when a Chinese-made 107mm rocket hit the DC. Hashmi was the first British Muslim soldier to die during the war on terror.

Each attack was repulsed as British troops posted on the DC rooftop directed fire from artillery, mortars and airstrikes from attack helicopters and jets against the Taliban, inflicting heavy losses. The situation worsened when the Afghan policemen began defecting to the Taliban, giving them inside information about the layout of the base.

=== Operation Mountain Thrust ===
On 16 July, during Operation Mountain Thrust, 200 British paratroopers, supported by Apache attack helicopters, were inserted into Sangin via Chinooks. With these reinforcements, the besieged British troops led a concentrated attack that broke the encirclement of the district centre. They were supported by 700 ISAF coalition troops, including American, Canadian, Afghan and Estonian forces. In a subsequent cordon and search operation, the town was sealed off and Taliban compounds were searched and cleared. Ten Taliban were confirmed killed during the clearing operation, and the others were driven out. The operation weakened the Taliban's hold on the city, but did not break it, and the DC soon came under attack again.

=== Continued fighting ===
On 20 August, a 20-man group of paratroopers was clearing a compound when they were ambushed by the Taliban. A section led by Corporal Bryan Budd counterattacked and Budd himself killed two enemy fighters, but the section was forced to withdraw under heavy fire, with two men injured. It was only later that the platoon commander realized that Budd was missing, but rescuing him proved impossible due to heavy fire from the Taliban. The company commander, Major Jamie Loden, organised a relief force cobbled together from various units, including elements of the Royal Engineers and two Royal Military Policemen who happened to be in Sangin. Supported by the fire of two Apache helicopters, the British finally rescued Budd an hour after he had been hit, but it was too late to save him, and he died of his injuries. For his bravery during this action, Corporal Budd was posthumously awarded the Victoria Cross, the highest distinction in the British armed forces.

The paratroopers were later replaced by 3 Commando Brigade, initially with Kilo Company 42 Commando Royal Marines, then C Company 2nd Battalion The Light Infantry (later 3 Rifles). After a relatively quiet tenure, Lima Company 42 Commando took up the mantle for a brief time before handing over the effort to C Company 2nd Battalion, Royal Regiment of Fusiliers.

A severe spike in violence took place with the 29th Commando Regiment Royal Artillery's Fire Support Teams, (then providing fire support to the infantry) sustaining three killed in action in less than a week. Mike Company's short but bloody tenure saw them relieved in March 2007 by C Company Group, 2nd Battalion, Royal Regiment of Fusiliers. In their first twenty days in Sangin, the fusiliers were attacked 79 times.

=== Relief of Sangin ===
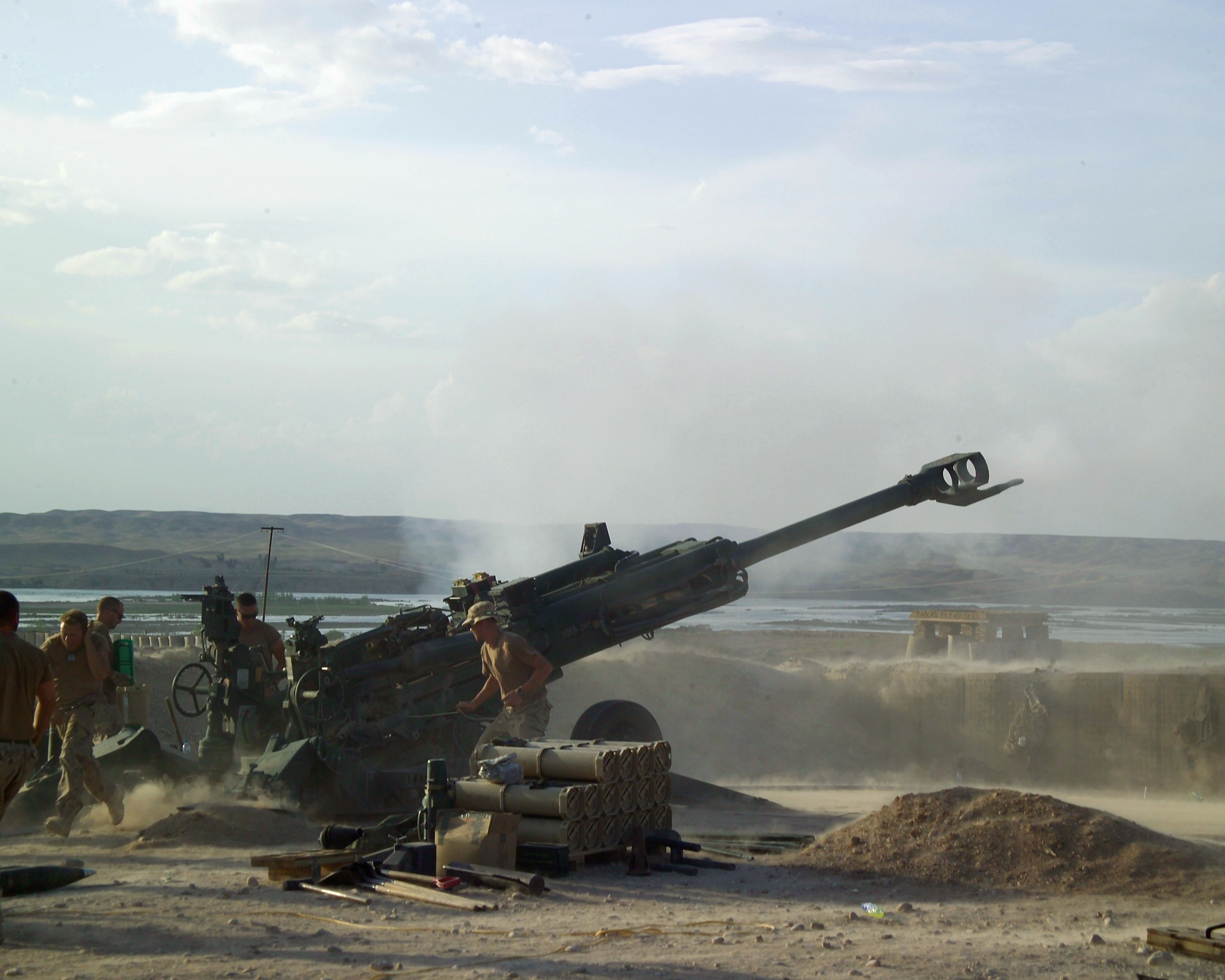
A Canadian M777 howitzer firing at Taliban positions, 7 April 2007

In April 2007, more than 1,000 coalition troops took part in Operation Silver, with the objective of relieving Sangin. NATO gave advance warning of the coming assault by dropping leaflets, and by word of mouth via the town elders, who were tasked with spreading the word.

U.S. troops from the 1st Battalion, 508th Parachute Infantry Regiment (1/508) and the 82nd Airborne Division launched a heliborne assault at various locations approximately 5 kilometres (3.1 mi) south of the district centre. Augmented with elements of the Afghan National Army (ANA), 1/508 advanced north and pursued enemy forces to positions north and east of the district centre. Simultaneously, a column of armoured transports with 250 Royal Marines from 42 Commando attacked from the north. Danish and Estonian soldiers also participated, and fire-support was provided by Dutch and American aircraft, and by Canadian artillery.

On 5 April, coalition troops occupied Sangin, meeting only light resistance, as by this time the town had been mostly vacated by the Taliban, and abandoned by most of its inhabitants. Though Taliban groups still operated in surrounding areas, the Afghan civil authorities were able to return, marking the end of the siege. The governor of Helmand province appointed a new local governor, and a permanent ANA base was established in the town.

== See also ==
- Siege of Musa Qala
