= Operation Silver (2007) =

British-led operation against Taliban forces

Operation Silver was a British-led operation against Taliban forces in Helmand province in Afghanistan in 2007.

== History ==
On April 5, 2007, coalition forces launched Operation Silver, as part of the wider Operation Achilles, with some 1,000 troops. After giving advance warning of their offensive, they advanced into Sangin, which had been mostly abandoned by the insurgents. The new governor of Helmand Assadullah Wafa, was able to install a new district governor, and ISAF claimed to have pacified the town. The Taliban claim to still control neighbouring areas. Since the end of the siege, the district compound has still come under attack, but the British have built two new forward operating bases a few miles away that draw most of the Taliban attacks away from the town.
