= Bryan Budd =

Recipient of the Victoria Cross

Corporal Bryan Budd VC
- Born: 16 July 1977; Belfast, Northern Ireland
- Died: 20 August 2006 (aged 29); Sangin, Afghanistan
- Military career
- Allegiance: United Kingdom
- Branch: British Army
- Service years: 1995–2006 †
- Rank: Corporal
- Service number: 25048092
- Unit: Parachute Regiment
- Conflicts: Iraq War: Operation Telic; War in Afghanistan: Operation Herrick
- Awards: Victoria Cross

Bryan James Budd, VC (16 July 1977 – 20 August 2006) was a British Army soldier and a Northern Irish recipient of the Victoria Cross, the highest award for gallantry in the face of the enemy that can be awarded to British and Commonwealth forces.

Budd was a corporal in the 3rd Battalion, Parachute Regiment when he was killed while on active service during Operation Herrick in Afghanistan. He died of injuries sustained during a fire fight with Taliban forces in Sangin, Helmand Province, from a bullet probably fired from a NATO weapon. The incident occurred whilst he was on a routine patrol close to the District Centre. He was the 20th UK serviceman to die in Afghanistan since the start of operations in November 2001. On 14 December 2006, it was announced by the Ministry of Defence that Budd would be posthumously awarded the Victoria Cross, only the 13th award of the medal since the end of the Second World War.

== Early life ==
Budd had been in the British Army for ten years, serving with the Pathfinder Platoon, which carries out reconnaissance deep behind enemy lines. As part of the Pathfinders, he served in many operational theatres including the former Yugoslavia, Sierra Leone, Afghanistan and Iraq.

In May 2002, Budd passed his section commander's battle course with distinction, and was due to be promoted to platoon sergeant. He was a qualified combat survival instructor, rock climber and free-fall parachutist. He was posted to the Army Foundation College in Harrogate in 2004, where he trained young soldiers.

In June 2006, Budd joined A Company, 3 PARA as part of the 3,600-strong British task force. Posted to Afghanistan, A Company, 3 PARA was based in the southern Afghanistan town of Sangin in Helmand Province.

Due to come home on 25 August 2006, Budd was killed on 20 August defending his section against heavy Taliban attack outside Sangin, allowing the section to return to safety. His body was recovered an hour later, and he was confirmed dead. Budd's commanding officer, Lieutenant Colonel Stuart Tootal, described Budd at the time of his death as "an outstanding leader" who had a professional manner "that inspired confidence in all that worked with him". Tootal said: "Bryan died doing the job he loved, leading his men from the front, where he always was. He was proud to call himself a paratrooper and we were proud to stand beside him."

On 14 December 2006, the Ministry of Defence confirmed the award of the VC, the first posthumous VC awarded since the Falklands War of 1982. Budd's widow, Lorena, collected the VC from Buckingham Palace on 7 March 2007.

A new Physical and Recreational Training Centre at Colchester Garrison was named the Corporal Budd VC Gymnasium on its opening on 4 July 2008.

== First cited incident ==
In the first incident, on 27 July 2006, while on a routine patrol, Budd's section identified and engaged two enemy gunmen on the roof of a building in the centre of Sangin. During the ensuing fierce fire-fight, two of Budd's section were hit. One was seriously injured and collapsed in the open ground, where he remained exposed to enemy fire, with rounds striking the ground around him. Budd realised that he needed to regain the initiative and that the enemy needed to be driven back so that the casualty could be evacuated.

Under fire, he personally led the attack on the building where the enemy fire was heaviest, forcing the remaining fighters to flee across an open field where they were successfully engaged. This courageous and prompt action proved decisive in breaking the enemy and was undertaken at great personal risk. Budd's decisive leadership and conspicuous gallantry allowed his wounded colleague to be evacuated to safety where he subsequently received life-saving treatment.

== Death ==
On 20 August 2006, A Company, 3 PARA was located in the southern Afghanistan town of Sangin. Budd and his platoon were ordered to hold a small, isolated coalition outpost – dubbed a platoon house – to protect engineers blowing holes in a compound 500 metres away. The site was subject to almost daily Taliban onslaught for months.

On the day, there were three sections on patrol, a total of 24 men, spread out in a head-high cornfield around the compound. Budd spotted four Taliban approaching, at a distance of 50 metres. With hand signals, Budd led his section in a flanking manoeuvre round to the cornfield's outskirts to try to cut them off, but they were spotted and the Taliban opened fire on the troops. A further group of Taliban opened up fire from a wall further back. The British soldiers took heavy fire, kneeling or lying down trying to take cover. One soldier received a bullet in the shoulder, and another was shot in the nose.

Realising his section were taking heavy fire and were likely to be killed, Budd got up and rushed straight through the corn in the direction of the Taliban, now just 20 metres away. Budd opened up on them in fully automatic mode with his rifle, and contact was immediately lost, but the Taliban fire lessened and allowed the rest of his section to withdraw back to safety so the casualties could be treated.

After withdrawal, Budd was declared missing in action and most of A Company was sent back to find him. Apache and Harrier air support was called in to beat the Taliban back. An hour later, Budd was found beside three dead Taliban.

Corporal Andy Waddington's section of men pushed forward through the cornfield and discovered and extracted Budd, who was badly wounded and had no pulse. Budd was declared dead on arrival at the platoon house.

Budd's Victoria Cross is displayed at the Parachute Regiment and Airborne Forces Museum at the Imperial War Museum Duxford, Cambridgeshire, while his grave lies in Colchester Cemetery in Essex.

== Personal life ==
Budd was married to Lorena Budd, a clerk in 5 Regiment, Royal Artillery at Catterick, North Yorkshire. The couple had two daughters, Isabelle (born 2004), and Imogen, born a month after Budd died in Afghanistan. In addition to his twin he also has a brother and sister.

== Awards ==
Budd had been awarded a number of military decorations and service medals. These include:

- Victoria Cross
- General Service Medal
- NATO Medal – Kosovo
- NATO Medal – Macedonia
- OSM "Sierra Leone"
- OSM "Afghanistan"
- Iraq Medal
- Golden Jubilee Medal

His official VC citation reads;

During July and August 2006, 'A' Company, 3rd Battalion, the Parachute Regiment were deployed in the District Centre at Sangin. They were constantly under sustained attack from a combination of Taliban small arms, rocket-propelled grenades, mortar and rocket fire.

On 27 July 2006, whilst on a routine patrol, Corporal Bryan Budd's section identified and engaged two enemy gunmen on the roof of a building in the centre of Sangin. During the ensuing fierce fire-fight, two of Corporal Budd's section were hit. One was seriously injured and collapsed in the open ground, where he remained exposed to enemy fire, with rounds striking the ground around him. Corporal Budd realised that he needed to regain the initiative and that the enemy needed to be driven back so that the casualty could be evacuated.

Under fire, he personally led the attack on the building where the enemy fire was heaviest, forcing the remaining fighters to flee across an open field where they were successfully engaged. This courageous and prompt action proved decisive in breaking the enemy and was undertaken at great personal risk. Corporal Budd's decisive leadership and conspicuous gallantry allowed his wounded colleague to be evacuated to safety where he subsequently received life-saving treatment.

A month later, on 20 August 2006, Corporal Budd was leading his section on the right forward flank of a platoon clearance patrol near Sangin District Centre. Another section was advancing with a Land Rover fitted with a .50 calibre heavy machine gun on the patrol's left flank. Pushing through thick vegetation, Corporal Budd identified a number of enemy fighters 30 metres ahead. Undetected, and in an attempt to surprise and destroy the enemy, Corporal Budd, initiated a flanking manoeuvre. However, the enemy spotted the Land Rover on the left flank and the element of surprise was lost for the whole platoon.

In order to regain the initiative, Corporal Budd decided to assault the enemy and ordered his men to follow him. As they moved forward the section came under a withering fire that incapacitated three of his men. The continued enemy fire and these losses forced the section to take cover. But, Corporal Budd continued to assault on his own, knowing full well the likely consequences of doing so without the close support of his remaining men. He was wounded but continued to move forward, attacking and killing the enemy as he rushed their position.

Inspired by Corporal Budd's example, the rest of the platoon reorganised and pushed forward their attack, eliminating more of the enemy and eventually forcing their withdrawal. Corporal Budd susequently [sic] died of his wounds, and when his body was later recovered it was found surrounded by three dead Taliban.

Corporal Budd's conspicuous gallantry during these two engagements saved the lives of many of his colleagues. He acted in the full knowledge that the rest of his men had either been struck down or had been forced to go to ground. His determination to press home a single-handed assault against a superior enemy force despite his wounds stands out as a premeditated act of inspirational leadership and supreme valour. In recognition of this, Corporal Budd is awarded the Victoria Cross.

== See also ==
- British Forces casualties in Afghanistan since 2001
