= Provincial Reconstruction Team Helmand =

2004–2013 US–UK military unit in Afghanistan

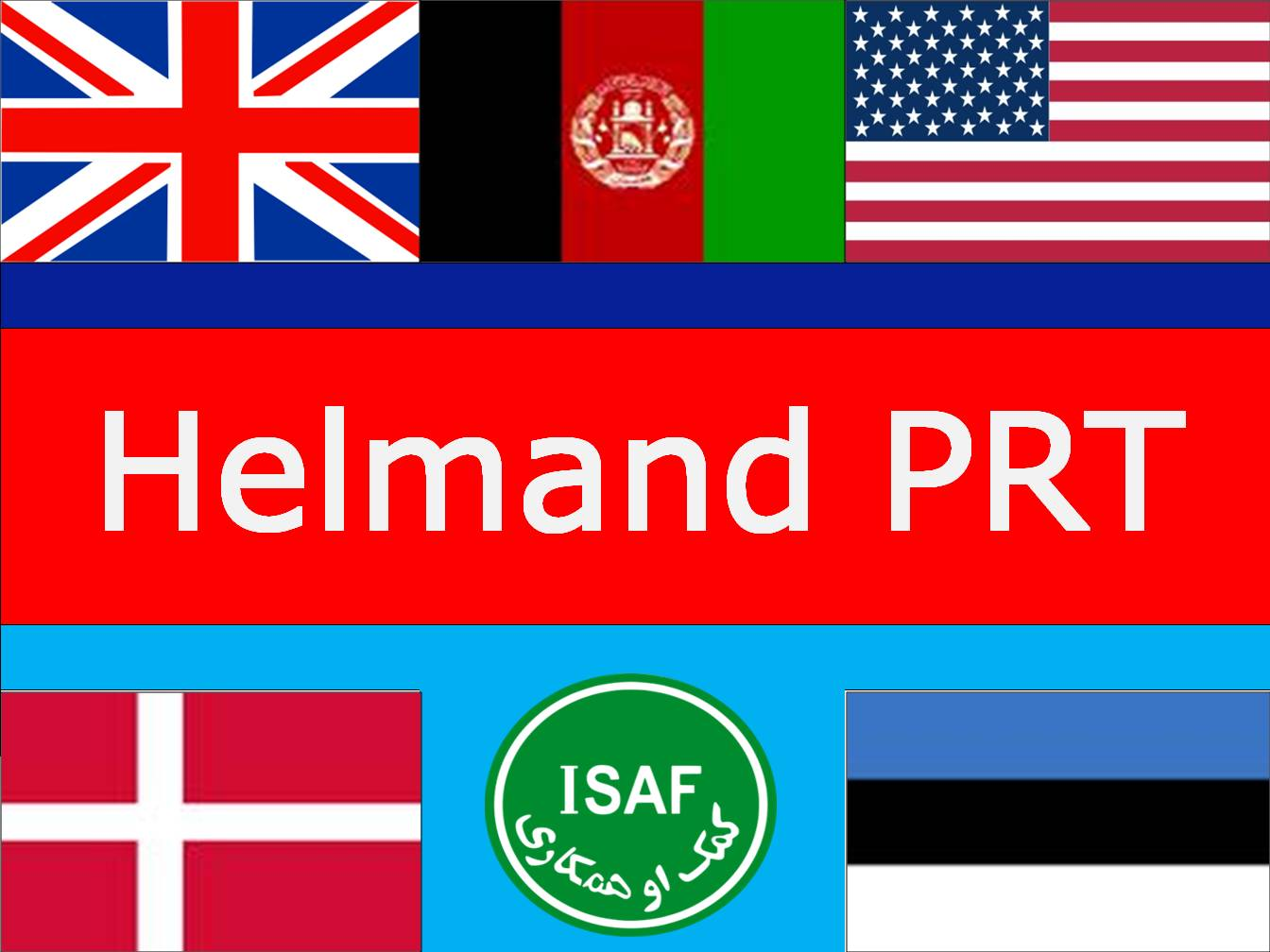
- Insignia of PRT Helmand
- Role: Reconstruction/Area Security

The Helmand Provincial Reconstruction Team (HPRT) was established in September 2004. It was led by the US until 1 May 2006, when this responsibility was handed to the UK. HPRT ceased operations in Lashkar Gah on 27 December 2013.

== Location ==
The Helmand PRT was headquartered in the province's capital, Lashkar Gah. It operated district field offices on military bases in Gereshk, Garmsir, Sangin, Nad-e Ali, Now Zad, Marjah, Khan-e shin and Musa Qalah. These offices are now closed.

== Structure and staffing ==
The Helmand PRT was part of the International Security Assistance Force in Afghanistan and was located within Regional Command Southwest. HPRT was funded by the UK, US, Danish and Estonian governments. With a core team of over 100 civilian and military staff, the HPRT was one of the largest PRTs in Afghanistan. HPRT was a led by a civilian who outranked the British military commander in Helmand.

UK, US and Danish District Stabilisation Teams were located in 11 of Helmand's 14 districts. A Stabilisation Team typically comprised: civilian stabilisation advisers; civilian specialists (e.g. in agriculture); a political adviser; and working with a UK Military Stabilisation Support Team (MSST), a US Civil Affairs Team or a Danish CIMIC (Civil Military Cooperation) Support Team. The Stabilisation Teams worked alongside the District Regimental Battle Group or battalion headquarters to coordinate civil and military activity.

== Activities ==
The PRT worked to deliver a provincial stabilisation and development plan that had been agreed between the Government of Afghanistan and international partners. The plan coordinated the efforts of 9 themes, or strands: Governance and Politics; Rule of Law; Counter-Narcotics; Population Engagement; Health; Education; Agriculture; Infrastructure and Private Sector Development. To deliver this Helmand PRT worked with the Government of Afghanistan, ISAF, and the Afghan National Security Forces. Helmand PRT had more resources than any other PRT.

The PRT combined with the UK's Department for International Development, USAID and the Danish Governments development agency (DANIDA) to provide £6m support to poppy eradication initiatives.

HPRT closed in 2013 in line with the timetable for PRT closures throughout Afghanistan set by President Karzai.

== Notable people ==
- Henry Bolton, Stabilization Team Leader, now a politician belonging to the Social Democratic Party

== See also ==
- Afghanistan
- International Security Assistance Force
- NATO
- Provincial Reconstruction Team
