= Sangin District =

Sangin سنگین
- District
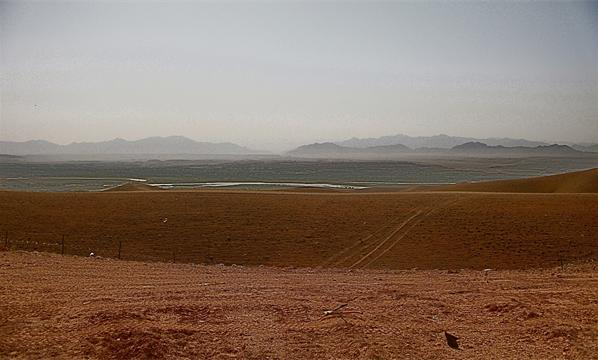
- The now closed Georgian ISAF Combat Outpost Shukvani in Helmand province, Afghanistan, which sits on a plateau overlooking the city of Sangin.

- Location within Afghanistan
- Coordinates: 32°04′24″N 64°50′16″E
- Country: Afghanistan
- Province: Helmand Province

Population (2012)
  - Total: 58,100

Sangin (Pashto: سنگین) is a district in the east of Helmand Province, Afghanistan. Its population was reported at 58,100 in 2012, all of which belong to the Pashtun ethnic group. The district centre is the town of Sangin. The area is irrigated by the Helmand and Arghandab Valley Authority.

== See also ==
- Districts of Afghanistan
