= List of 2014 films based on actual events =

This is a list of films and miniseries released in 2014 that are based on actual events. All films on this list are from American production unless indicated otherwise.

== 2014 ==
- 3 Mile Limit (2014) – New Zealand drama film based on the rise of Radio Hauraki
- 23 Blast (2014) – sports drama film inspired by the story of Travis Freeman, a Kentucky teen who loses his sight, but eventually overcomes the challenges of his disability, and continues to live his dream of playing football
- 24 Days (French: 24 jours, la vérité sur l'affaire Ilan Halimi) (2014) – French drama film based on The Affair of the Gang of Barbarians of January 2006
- 50 to 1 (2014) – sports drama film based on the true story of Mine That Bird, an undersized thoroughbred racehorse who won the 2009 Kentucky Derby in one of the biggest upsets in the history of the race
- 1987 (2014) – Canadian autobiographical drama film putting emphasis on Ricardo Trogi's teen years, when he was experiencing family problems and discovering his sexual identity
- A Most Wanted Man (2014) – British-American-German spy thriller film inspired by the real-life story of Murat Kurnaz, a Turkish citizen and legal resident of Germany who, after being arrested in Pakistan in 2001, was detained and tortured in American military detention camps, first at Kandahar in Afghanistan and then at Guantanamo Bay in Cuba, before being released in 2006
- A Murder Beside Yanhe River (Chinese: 黃克功案件) (2014) – Chinese historical drama film based on the murder case of Huang Kegong, who was a general of the Chinese Workers' and Peasants' Red Army
- A Poet in New York (2014) – British biographical drama television film exploring how Welsh poet Dylan Thomas died in New York at the age of 39
- Aaliyah: The Princess of R&B (2014) – biographical television film based on the life of R&B music star Aaliyah Dana Haughton, following her rise to fame and tragic death at age 22 when she was killed in a plane crash
- Accused (Dutch: Lucia de B.) (2014) – Dutch drama film about the Lucia de Berk case
- The Admiral: Roaring Currents (Korean: 명량) (2014) – South Korean epic action-war film based on the historical Battle of Myeongnyang
- Against the Sun (2014) – survival drama film about a World War II pilot, bombardier, and radioman who find themselves adrift on a lifeboat without food or water after being forced to ditch their plane during a scouting mission, based on a true story
- Allende in His Labyrinth (Spanish: Allende en su laberinto) (2014) – Chilean drama film depicting a fictionalized account of the events in the Palacio de la Moneda in Santiago de Chile and the last hours of life of President Salvador Allende during the 1973 Chilean coup d'état
- The Ambassador to Bern (Hungarian: A berni követ) (2014) – Hungarian historical drama television film based on a true story that took place on August 16, 1958, in Bern, Switzerland, when two Hungarian immigrants attacked the Hungarian embassy in an attempt to draw international attention to the Soviet occupation of Hungary
- American Sniper (2014) – biographical war drama film based on the life of Chris Kyle who became the deadliest marksman in U.S. military history with 255 kills from four tours in the Iraq War
- Amour Fou (2014) – Austrian historical biographical film about the German writer Heinrich von Kleist and his lover Henriette Vogel in the final stages of their lives
- Apaye (2014) – Nigerian biographical drama film about the life and struggles of Elder Irene Yepayeye Uriah-Dieah, who was a relative of Goodluck Jonathan in real life
- Backcountry (2014) – Canadian nature survival horror film loosely based on the true story of a hungry man-eating black bear that attacked Mark Jordan and Jacqueline Perry, in the back country of Missinaibi Lake Provincial Park, North of Chapleau, Ontario in 2005, events for which Mark later received the Star of Courage award from Governor General Michaëlle Jean
- Bad Country (2014) – crime action drama film based on the true story of a veteran detective who infiltrates the most powerful criminal enterprise in the South
- Beloved Sisters (German: Die geliebten Schwestern) (2014) – German biographical film based on the life of the German poet Friedrich Schiller and upon his long relationships with two sisters, Caroline and Charlotte von Lengefeld
- The Better Angels (2014) – historical biographical drama film about United States president Abraham Lincoln's formative years
- Bhopal: A Prayer for Rain (2014) – Indian-British historical drama film based on the Bhopal disaster that happened in India on 2–3 December 1984
- Big Eyes (2014) – biographical drama film about the relationship between American artist Margaret Keane and her second husband, Walter Keane, who, in the 1950s and 1960s, took credit for Margaret's phenomenally popular paintings of people with big eyes
- The Brittany Murphy Story (2014) – biographical drama television film based on the life of Brittany Murphy
- Cantinflas (2014) – Mexican biographical comedy drama film based on the life of actor and comedian Cantinflas
- Carlotta (2014) – Australian biographical drama television film about the life of pioneering transgender performer Carol Kaye, also known as Carlotta
- Casanova Variations (2014) – French-Austrian-German historical musical drama film about the life of Giacomo Casanova
- Castles in the Sky (2014) – British historical drama television film portraying Robert Watson-Watt and other British scientists' struggle to invent radar in the years leading to World War II
- Cesar Chavez (2014) – Mexican-American historical biographical film about the life of American labor leader Cesar Chavez, who cofounded the United Farm Workers
- Chaar Sahibzaade (Punjabi: ਚਾਰ ਸਾਹਿਬਜ਼ਾਦੇ) (2014) – Indian Punjabi-language 3D animated historical drama film based on the sacrifices of the sons of the 10th Sikh guru Guru Gobind Singh
- Chagall — Malevich (Russian: Шагал — Малевич) (2014) – Russian biographical drama film about the Vitebsk period in the life of the artist Marc Chagall and his relationship with fellow artist Kazimir Malevich
- Che (Persian: چ) (2014) – Iranian biographical war film depicting 48 hours of the life of Mostafa Chamran, who was then defense minister of Iran
- Cilla (2014) – British biographical miniseries about the early career of Cilla Black
- The Circle (German: Der Kreis) (2014) – Swiss biographical drama film concerning the social network of gay men that developed in Zürich in the 1940s and 1950s, centering on The Circle, a gay publication, and the social events it sponsored
- Closer to the Moon (Romanian: Mai aproape de lună) (2014) – Romanian-American comedy drama film based on the true story of the Ioanid Gang
- Corbo (2014) – Canadian drama film depicting the true story of a Québecan teenager who evolves from pro-independence activist to radical terrorist with the Front de libération du Québec
- The Dark Horse (2014) – New Zealand drama film based on the real-life story of Genesis Potini, a brilliant New Zealand chess player who suffered from severe bipolar disorder
- Dearest (Chinese: 親愛的) (2014) – Chinese-Hong Kong crime drama film about kidnapping in China, based on a true story
- Decline of an Empire (2014) – British biographical historical film about the life of Catherine of Alexandria
- Desert Dancer (2014) – British biographical drama film based on the true story of Afshin Ghaffarian, a young, self-taught dancer in Iran, who risked his life for his dream to become a dancer despite a nationwide dancing ban
- Difret (Amharic: ድፍረት) (2014) – Ethiopian drama film chronicling a legal-precedent setting court case that outlawed the kidnapping of child brides (ጠለፈ tʼelefa) in Ethiopia
- Diplomacy (French & German: Diplomatie) (2014) – French-German historical drama film based on the Liberation of Paris and Hitler's response
- Dolphin Tale 2 (2014) – family drama film based on the true story about a rescued bottlenose dolphin named Winter
- Dr. Prakash Baba Amte – The Real Hero (Marathi: डॉ प्रकाश बाबा आमटे) (2014) – Indian Marathi-language biographical film on the lives of Dr. Prakash Baba Amte, the son of social worker Baba Amte, and his wife Mandakini Amte
- Effie Gray (2014) – British biographical film based on the true story of John Ruskin's marriage to Euphemia Gray and the subsequent annulment of their marriage
- Electric Slide (2014) – biographical crime film based on Los Angeles-based bank robber Eddie Dodson, who robbed 64 banks in 1983 before he was caught
- Escobar: Paradise Lost (2014) – romantic thriller film chronicling the life of a surfer who falls in love while working with his brother in Colombia and finds out that the girl's uncle is Colombian drug lord Pablo Escobar
- The Face of an Angel (2014) – British psychological thriller film based on the real-life story of the murder of Meredith Kercher in 2007
- Fair Play (2014) – Czech sports drama film inspired by real events and fictionalizing a story of steroid abuse in 1980s Czechoslovakia
- Fleming: The Man Who Would Be Bond (2014) – British biographical miniseries detailing the military career of James Bond creator Ian Fleming
- Foxcatcher (2014) – biographical sports thriller film loosely based on the events surrounding multimillionaire John du Pont's 1986 recruitment of Mark Schultz and his older brother David, to help coach U.S. wrestlers for participation in Olympic competition, and the subsequent murder of David Schultz by du Pont in January 1996
- The Gate (French: Le Temps des aveux) (2014) – French-Belgian-Cambodian drama film based on the story of François Bizot who was held captive by the Khmer Rouge for several months
- Get on Up (2014) – biographical musical drama film about the life of singer James Brown
- Getúlio (2014) – Brazilian biographical drama film about Brazilian president Getúlio Vargas and the events that led to his death
- Gloria (2014) – Mexican biographical drama film based on the life of Mexican pop singer Gloria Trevi
- Gods (Polish: Bogowie) (2014) – Polish drama film based on the life and career of Polish cardiac surgeon Zbigniew Religa, who performed the first successful heart transplant in Poland in 1987
- The Golden Era (Chinese: 黄金时代) (2014) – Chinese-Hong Kong biographical drama film telling the life story of Xiao Hong, one of China's most famous essayists and novelists, who reflected the progressive thinking not frequently seen during the 1930s
- Good Kill (2014) – war drama film based on a true story of drone warfare
- The Good Lie (2014) – drama film about a group of Sudanese refugees, given the chance to resettle in the U.S., arrive in Kansas City, Missouri, where their encounter with an employment agency counselor forever changes all of their lives
- Grace of Monaco (2014) – biographical drama film based on former Hollywood star Grace Kelly's crisis of marriage and identity, during a dispute between Monaco's Prince Rainier III and France's Charles de Gaulle in 1962
- The Great Fire (2014) – British historical drama miniseries about the Great Fire of London in England in 1666
- The Great Victory (Portuguese: A Grande Vitória) (2014) – Brazilian sports drama film telling the true story of the judoka Max Trombini, who had a humble and troubled childhood
- Happy Face Killer (2014) – Canadian-American crime thriller television film inspired by real-life events of the hunt and capture of serial killer Keith Hunter Jesperson
- Heaven Is for Real (2014) – religious drama film based on Pastor Todd Burpo and Lynn Vincent's 2010 book of the same name documenting the report of a near-death experience by Burpo's three-year-old son Colton
- Houdini (2014) – biographical miniseries based on the life of the legendary illusionist and escape artist Harry Houdini, from poverty to worldwide fame
- House of Manson (2014) – biographical crime film based on the life of Charles Manson
- I Am Nojoom, Age 10 and Divorced (Arabic: أنا نجوم بنت العاشرة ومطلقة) (2014) – Yemeni drama film based on the story of Nujood Ali, who sought divorce from her abusive husband at age 10
- The Imitation Game (2014) – British historical drama film about cryptanalyst Alan Turing, who decrypted German intelligence messages for the British government during World War II
- In Silence (Slovak: V tichu) (2014) – Slovak biographical war film depicting the lives of real Jewish musicians in Czechoslovakia and Germany who were persecuted during the Holocaust
- In the Crosswind (Estonian: Risttuules) (2014) – Estonian historical drama film about the forced deportation by Stalin's Soviet Union of an Estonian family to Siberia in the June deportation, based on a real-life diary from the period
- In the Name of My Daughter (French: L'Homme qu'on aimait trop) (2014) – French drama film retracing the Agnès Le Roux case, which made headlines in France from the late 1970s to the 2010s
- Invasion 1897 (2014) – Nigerian historical drama film depicting the events of the February, 1897 invasion, destruction and looting of the ancient West African kingdom of Benin; and the deposition and exile of its once powerful king
- Iron Ivan (Russian: Поддубный) (2014) – Russian biographical sports drama film about the fighter Ivan Poddubny, who could defeat any opponent in the ring, but lost to love
- Italo (2014) – Italian comedy film based on the true story of a mongrel dog that thanks to its skills earned the honorary citizenship of Scicli, Ragusa
- Itsi Bitsi (2014) – Danish biographical drama film about the band Steppeulvene
- Jaatishwar (Bengali: জাতিশ্বর) (2014) – Indian Bengali-language musical drama film revolving around the life and notable works of Anthony Firingee, a 19th-century folk poet of Portuguese origin
- Jack Strong (2014) – Polish political thriller film based on the true story of Ryszard Kukliński, a Polish People's Army colonel who spied for the American Central Intelligence Agency during the height of the Cold War
- Jamesy Boy (2014) – biographical crime drama film depicting the true story of ex-convict James Burns
- Jayhawkers (2014) – biographical sports drama film following the life of Wilt Chamberlain, Phog Allen, and the 1956–57 Kansas Jayhawks men's basketball team
- Jersey Boys (2014) – musical drama film based on the 2004 Tony Award-winning jukebox musical of the same name about the musical group The Four Seasons
- Jimmy's Hall (2014) – British-Irish-French historical drama film telling the story of the deportation to the United States in 1933 of Irish Communist Jimmy Gralton, who led the Revolutionary Workers' Group, a precursor of the Communist Party of Ireland, in County Leitrim
- Kajaki (2014) – British war drama film based on the Kajaki Dam incident, involving Mark Wright and a small unit of British soldiers positioned near the Kajaki Dam, in Helmand province, Afghanistan
- Kano (2014) – Taiwanese historical baseball film based on a true story depicting the multiracial Kano baseball team from Japanese-era Taiwan, overcoming extreme odds to represent the island in the 1931 Japanese High School Baseball Championship at Koshien Stadium
- Kenau (2014) – Dutch-Hungarian-Belgian action film inspired by the legendary story of Kenau who led an army of women in the siege of Haarlem by the Spaniards in 1573 during the Eighty Years' War between the Netherlands and Spain
- Kid Cannabis (2014) – biographical comedy drama film based on the true story of a teen named Nate Norman who dropped out of high school to build a multimillion-dollar marijuana ring by trafficking drugs with his friends through the woods across the US-Canada international border
- Kill the Messenger (2014) – biographical crime thriller film about reporter Gary Webb who was found dead in his apartment
- Klondike (2014) – historical drama miniseries about Bill Haskell, a real-life adventurer who traveled to Yukon, Canada, in the late 1890s during the Klondike Gold Rush
- Labyrinth of Lies (German: Im Labyrinth des Schweigens) (2014) – German political drama film exposing the conspiracy of prominent German institutions and government branches to cover up the crimes of Nazis during World War II
- Lakshmi (Hindi: लक्ष्मी) (2014) – Indian Hindi-language biographical social problem film dealing with the harsh realities of human trafficking and child prostitution, which continue behind closed curtains in rural areas of India, based on true events
- Leopardi (Italian: Il giovane favoloso) (2014) – Italian biographical drama film telling the story of the short life of the great Italian poet Giacomo Leopardi
- The Letters (2014) – biographical drama film based on the life of Mother Teresa and how Vatican priest Father Celeste van Exem was charged with the task of investigating acts and events following her death
- The Little Queen (French: La Petite Reine) (2014) – Canadian sports drama film based on the true story of cyclist Geneviève Jeanson, whose career as a professional cyclist was derailed by a doping scandal
- Lizzie Borden Took an Ax (2014) – biographical drama television film based on the true story of Lizzie Borden, a young American woman tried and acquitted of the August 4, 1892, axe murders of her father and stepmother in Fall River, Massachusetts
- Lonesome Dove Church (2014) – Canadian Western drama film depicting the true story of the formation of the Lonesome Dove Church in Texas
- Love & Mercy (2014) – biographical drama film about musician and songwriter Brian Wilson of The Beach Boys
- Low Down (2014) – biographical drama film about famed jazz pianist Joe Albany and his struggles with drug addiction
- The Man Who Defended Gavrilo Princip (Serbian: Branio sam Mladu Bosnu) (2014) – Serbian biographical war film based on the true story of the assassination of Archduke Franz Ferdinand of Austria
- Manjunath (Hindi: मंजूनाथ) (2014) – Indian Hindi-language drama film based on the true story of Manjunath Shanmugam, the Indian Institute of Management Lucknow graduate who was killed in November 2005 for his stand against corruption and fuel adulteration
- Marie Curie, A Woman on the Front (French: Marie Curie, une femme sur le front) (2014) – French biographical drama television film about the life and work of Marie Curie
- Marie's Story (French: Marie Heurtin) (2014) – French biographical film based on the true story of Marie Heurtin, a girl who was born deaf and blind in late 19th century France
- Marvellous (2014) – British drama television film about the life of Neil Baldwin
- Mary Kom (Hindi: मैरी कॉम) (2014) – Indian Hindi-language biographical sports film based on the life of the eponymous boxer Mary Kom
- Merry Riana: A Million Dollar Dream (Indonesian: Merry Riana: Mimpi Sejuta Dolar) (2014) – Indonesian biographical drama film telling the story of Merry Riana living in Singapore because of the May 1998 riots of Indonesia, and her journey to becoming a successful motivator
- Million Dollar Arm (2014) – biographical sports drama film based on the true story of baseball pitchers Rinku Singh and Dinesh Patel who were discovered by sports agent J. B. Bernstein after winning a reality show competition
- The Monuments Men (2014) – American-German war film loosely based on the true story of an Allied group from the Monuments, Fine Arts, and Archives program that is given the task of finding and saving pieces of art and other culturally important items before Nazis destroy or steal them, during World War II
- Mr. Turner (2014) – British-French-German biographical drama film based around the last twenty-five years of the life and career of painter J. M. W. Turner
- Mt. Hakkoda (Japanese: ドキュメンタリー八甲田山) (2014) – Japanese-Italian disaster drama film about the Hakkōda Mountains incident
- Nena (2014) – German-Dutch romantic drama film inspired by Saskia Diesing's own experiences of adolescence, as well as her father's battle with multiple sclerosis
- Next Time I'll Aim for the Heart (French: La Prochaine fois je viserai le cœur) (2014) – French thriller film based on the story of Alain Lamare, a gendarme who was later revealed to be a murderer
- Noble (2014) – Irish-Vietnamese-British biographical film about the true life story of Christina Noble, a children's rights campaigner, charity worker and writer, who founded the Christina Noble Children's Foundation in 1989
- The Normal Heart (2014) – drama television film depicting the rise of the HIV-AIDS crisis in New York City between 1981 and 1984
- Once in a Lifetime (French: Les Héritiers) (2014) – French drama film chronicling the relationship of a teacher with teenagers who have long since dropped out of the school system, based on a true story
- Our World War (2014) – British war drama miniseries based on first hand accounts of the soldiers who served in the First World War and how it affected people on the battlefield
- Pasolini (2014) – French-Italian-Belgian drama film about the final days of Italian film director Pier Paolo Pasolini
- Pawn Sacrifice (2014) – biographical drama film portraying the Cold War-era championship chess match between Bobby Fischer and Boris Spassky
- The Perfect Dictatorship (Spanish: La dictadura perfecta) (2014) – Mexican black comedy political satire film based on the real life perceived Televisa controversy, which consisted of Mexican citizens heavily perceiving the news media was unfairly favoring PRI candidate Enrique Peña Nieto during the 2012 presidential election in Mexico
- The Perfect Wave (2014) – South African-New Zealand-Indonesian biographical drama film about the life of Ian McCormack, a surfer who became a minister after his near death experience
- The Pilgrim (Portuguese: Não Pare na Pista) (2014) – Brazilian-Spanish biographical drama film about the Brazilian lyricist and novelist Paulo Coelho
- Pride (2014) – British LGBT-related historical comedy-drama film based on the true story of a group of lesbian and gay activists who raised money to help families affected by the British miners' strike in 1984, at the outset of what would become the Lesbians and Gays Support the Miners campaign
- Queen of the Mountains (Kyrgyz: Kurmanjan Datka) (2014) – Kyrgyzstani epic drama film telling the epic story of the strong-willed, courageous and independent woman before her time, Kurmanjan Datka, who is revered to this day for her diplomacy for saving her nation from complete destruction when the Russians invaded
- Ramanujan (Tamil: ராமானுஜன்) (2014) – Indian Tamil-language biographical film based on the life of Indian mathematician Srinivasa Ramanujan
- Rang Rasiya (2014) – Indian erotic drama film based on the life of the 19th-century Indian painter Raja Ravi Varma
- Return to Zero (2014) – drama television film based on a true story of writer, Sean Hanish and his pregnant wife, only to have their lives devastated when they learn that the child has died in the womb
- Rise of the Legend (Chinese: 黃飛鴻之英雄有夢) (2014) – Chinese-Hong Kong kung-fu action film about Wong Fei-hung
- Rob the Mob (2014) – romantic crime film about Thomas and Rosemarie Uva who specialize in robbing mafia social clubs and stumble upon a score bigger than they could ever imagine, becoming targets of both the mob and the FBI in the process
- Rosewater (2014) – political drama film based on Maziar Bahari's 2009 imprisonment by Iran, connected to an interview he participated in on The Daily Show that same year
- Run for Your Life (2014) – thriller drama television film about a battered Canadian woman who flees Canada to escape her abusive husband, based on a true story
- Saint Laurent (2014) – French biographical drama film centring on Yves Saint Laurent's life from 1967 to 1976, during which time the famed fashion designer was at the peak of his career
- See You in Montevideo (Serbian: Монтевидео, видимо се!) (2014) – Serbian sports comedy film telling the story of the Yugoslavia national team in the inaugural FIFA World Cup
- Selma (2014) – historical drama film based on the 1965 Selma to Montgomery voting rights marches
- Set Fire to the Stars (2014) – Welsh semi-biographical drama film about Dylan Thomas and John Malcolm Brinnin
- SK1 (French: L'Affaire SK1) (2014) – French thriller drama film chronicling the hunt and trial of a 1990s serial killer, dubbed "The Beast of the Bastille"
- Supremacy (2014) – thriller drama film chronicling the real life events of March 29–30, 1995, perpetrated by Aryan Brotherhood members Robert Walter Scully Jr. and Brenda Kay Moore
- The Tenor – Lirico Spinto (Korean: 더 테너 – 리리코 스핀토) (2014) – South Korean biographical film chronicling the life of South Korean tenor Bae Jae-chul who performed in numerous European operas, but lost his voice at the peak of his career due to thyroid cancer
- Testament of Youth (2014) – British drama film based on Vera Brittain, an independent young woman who abandoned her studies at Somerville College, Oxford, to become a First World War nurse
- The Theory of Everything (2014) – British biographical romantic drama film detailing the life of the theoretical physicist Stephen Hawking
- Tim Maia (2014) – Brazilian biographical drama film about the life of Brazilian musician Tim Maia
- Timbuktu (2014) – Mauritanian-French drama film based on the brief occupation of Timbuktu, Mali by Ansar Dine, and the 2012 public stoning of an unmarried couple in Aguelhok
- Tokyo Fiancée (2014) – Belgian romantic drama film based on Amélie Nothomb's 2007 autographical novel of the same name
- Tommy Cooper: Not Like That, Like This (2014) – British biographical drama television film focusing on the life of the late Tommy Cooper, the popular British comedian and the dilemma he faced when he fell in love with his assistant Mary Kay
- The Unauthorized Saved by the Bell Story (2014) – biographical drama television film based on the story of delves into the experiences of six unknown young actors placed into the Hollywood spotlight when they were cast for Saved by the Bell
- Unbroken (2014) – war drama film about Louis Zamperini who survived in a raft for 47 days after his bomber ditched in the ocean during the Second World War, before being captured by the Japanese and being sent to a series of prisoner of war camps
- United Passions (French: United Passions: La Légende du football) (2014) – French drama film about the origins of FIFA
- The Vancouver Asahi (Japanese: バンクーバーの朝日) (2014) – Japanese-Canadian baseball drama film based on the true story of a Vancouver-based baseball team called the Vancouver Asahi which existed before the Second World War
- The Water Diviner (2014) – Australian historical drama film based on a true story about an Australian farmer who travels to Turkey after World War I to search for his missing sons
- Welcome to New York (2014) – French-American drama film inspired by the Dominique Strauss-Kahn affair when the prominent French politician was accused of sexual assaulting a hotel maid
- When the Game Stands Tall (2014) – sports drama film concerning a record 151-game 1992–2003 high school football winning streak by De La Salle High School of Concord, California
- Wild (2014) – biographical adventure drama film based on Cheryl Strayed and her determination to complete the Pacific Crest Trail by hiking and backpacking after numerous problems left her life in shambles
- Yves Saint Laurent (2014) – French biographical drama film based on the life of Yves Saint Laurent from 1958
