= Kajaki (disambiguation) =

Kajaki is a village in Afghanistan.

Kajaki may also refer to:

- Kajaki District, Afghanistan
- Kajaki Dam, Afghanistan
- Kajaki (film), a 2014 British docudrama
