= Operation Eagle's Summit =

2008 military operation in Afghanistan

- Part of the War in Afghanistan (2001–2021)
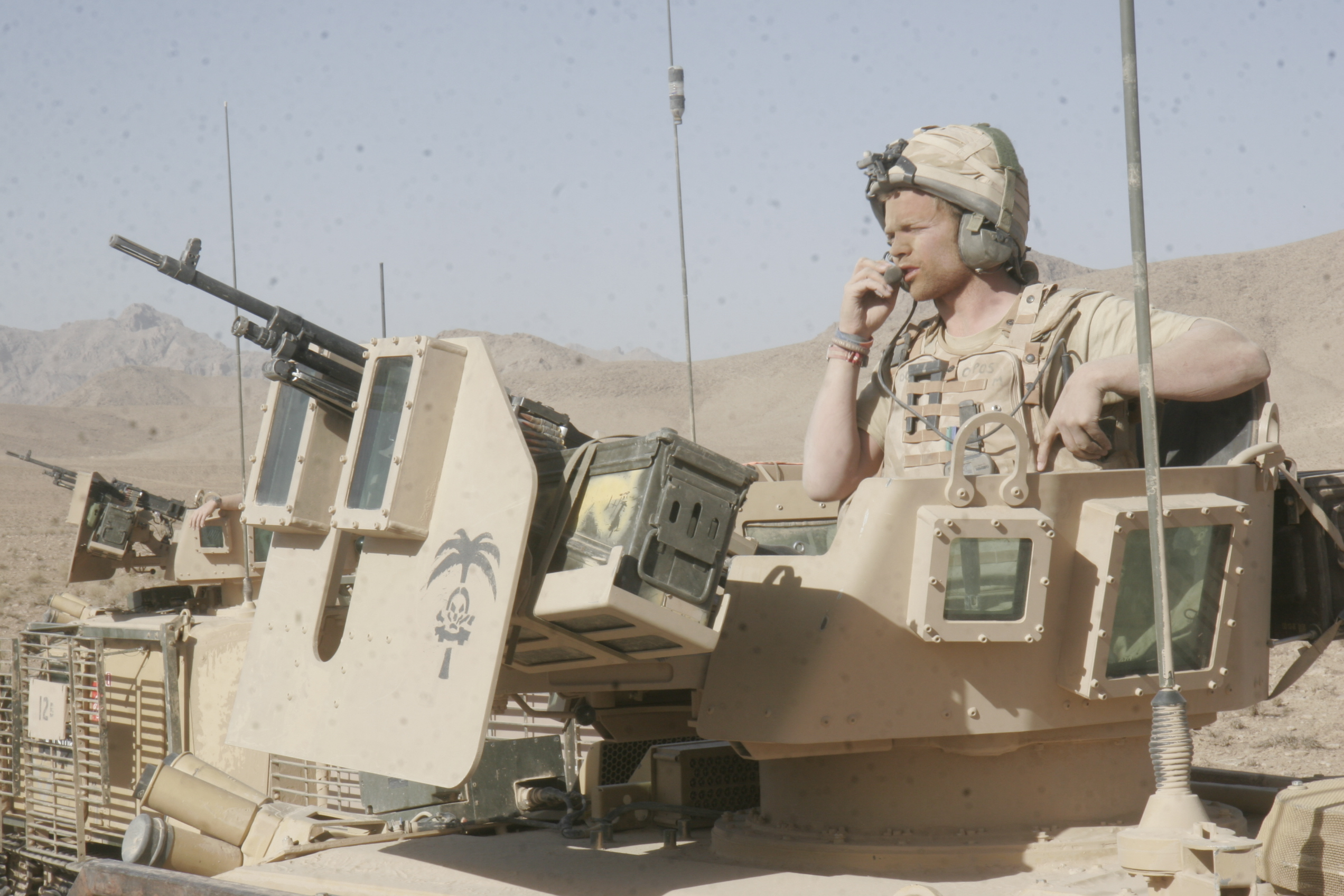
- British troops of the Queen's Royal Lancers providing security for the convoy.
Date	August 2008 – September 5, 2008
Location	Kandahar and Helmand Provinces, Afghanistan
Result	Coalition tactical victory.

Belligerents
Coalition: United Kingdom; Islamic Republic of Afghanistan; Canada; United States; Denmark; Australia; France; Netherlands	(Afghanistan) Taliban

Commanders and leaders
(United Kingdom) Mark Carleton-Smith	?

Strength
(United Kingdom) 2,000 (Afghanistan) 1,000; Other ISAF: 1,000; Total: 5,000	Unknown

Casualties and losses
(Canada) 1 killed, 7 injured (United Kingdom) 2 injured (Afghanistan) 2 injured	200 killed (NATO claim)

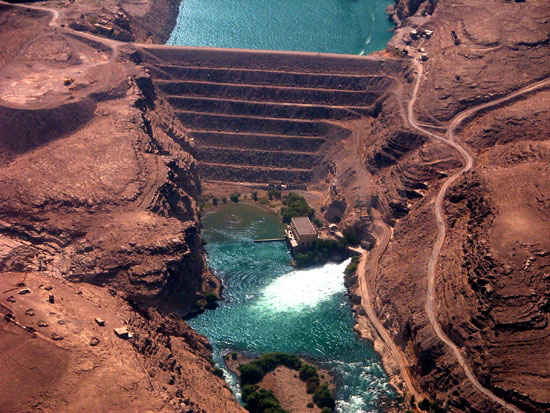
The Kajaki Dam provides flood control, power and irrigation water to the Helmand Valley.

Operation Eagle's Summit (Oqab Tsuka in Pashto) was a military operation conducted by ISAF and Afghan National Army troops, with the objective of transporting a 220-tonne turbine to the Kajaki Dam in Helmand Province through territory controlled by Taliban insurgents. Ending in success for the coalition, it involved many British troops, and was said to have been one of the largest logistical operations carried out by the British Army since World War II. The operation took its name from the eagle pictured on the insignia of the 16th Air Assault Brigade.

== Restoring Kajaki Dam ==
The Kajaki hydroelectric dam was completed in 1953 with the aid of a loan from the Export-Import Bank of the United States, in order to provide electricity and irrigation to the population of Helmand and Kandahar provinces under the Helmand Valley Authority. It was supposed to house three turbines, but only two were ever installed, and after years of civil war, only one was still in service by 2001. In 2004, the United States started work on restoring the dam's capacity and bringing its output to 53 megawatts. One turbine was repaired in 2005, but the restoration was hampered by the difficulty of delivering new turbines to Kajaki through Taliban-controlled territory, that required a large-scale military operation.

== Alternate route ==
TF Helmand (as lead planner) worked in conjunction with HQ RC(S) and TF Kandahar for four months in preparing the operation. They planned to avoid taking the most direct route, Route 611, which crossed several Taliban strongholds, and that was littered with IEDs placed by the insurgents and land mines left over from the Soviet presence in Afghanistan. Instead they planned to take the convoy carrying the turbine through the desert, following an itinerary codenamed "route Harriet", that was mapped by the Pathfinder Platoon weeks before the operation. The British tried to negotiate safe passage for the convoy, in some cases distributing cash sums to local elders, but these deals didn't work out.

The Chinese-made turbine was delivered to Kandahar airport on the night of August 27, and was taken through the first part of the journey by Canadian troops, until it reached a meeting point in the desert, where it was taken over by British forces for the last stretch of the route through Helmand. It was broken down into seven separate loads, each weighing some 30 tonnes, and carried on HET trucks.

After the transfer to British troops, the main convoy, composed of 100 vehicles stretching over four kilometres, included 50 Viking APCs, and Jackal and Mastiff vehicles. The whole Combat Logistic Patrol, as the convoys are called in military terminology, was made up of three elements. The Engineer Group (9 Parachute Squadron RE), the Command Group (CO 13 Air Assault Support Regiment RLC) and the Turbine Element (15 Air Assault Close Support Squadron RLC). Amongst the convoy were eight critical vehicles:

- Four Transformers
- Two Stators
- One Upper Bracket Assembly
- 80 Ton Crane

Attack helicopters provided overwatch, while air support came in the shape of US, French and Dutch aircraft. Combat engineers provided support, by building and shoring up the road the convoy was due to travel on.

Heliborne troops from the Parachute Regiment provided security for the convoy, by leapfrogging along its path.

At the same time, a dummy convoy composed of 30 to 40 Danish vehicles advanced along Highway 611, escorted by the 1st Battalion, The Parachute Regiment, in order to deceive the Taliban into ignoring "Harriet".

During the last stretch of the route, the main convoy was obliged to rejoin Highway 611, and travel through 4.5 miles of territory where some 200 insurgents were known to be active. The task of clearing the area was given to a force composed of 388 ANA soldiers and their 42 mentors from a Royal Irish Regiment Operational Mentoring and Liaison Team. After three days of intensive bombardment from NATO artillery, including MLRS rockets, and from coalition aircraft, the road was cleared of insurgents, allowing the convoy to reach its destination on September 3 at 2.30am. It took five days to travel 180 km, during which the convoy had endured very few attacks, and suffered no casualties through Taliban action. During this time British artillery fired 800 105mm shells and 54 rockets. The British claimed to have killed some 200 insurgents, but this could not be independently verified.

== Casualties ==
One British soldier was injured in a road traffic accident at Kajaki, and one Canadian soldier died and a further seven injured, when their vehicle struck an Improvised Explosive Device when returning to base.

== Outcome ==
The operation was hailed by NATO as a significant victory, that would contribute to winning the "hearts and minds" of the Afghan people. Brigadier Carleton-Smith, commander of Task Force Helmand, described it as "the end of the beginning" of the fighting in Helmand. However, The United States Army Corps of Engineers estimated in February 2015 that the yet unfinished dam wouldn't be operational until March 2016. This is due to the demand for around 900 tonnes of concrete in addition to the 220 tonnes of equipment delivered by the convoy.
