= Bryan Parry =

Welsh actor

- Born: 13 July 1992 (age 34); St Asaph, North Wales
- Education: Italia Conti Academy of Theatre Arts
- Occupation: Actor
- Years active: 2011–present
- Television: Doctors; In The Flesh; Hollyoaks; Pride; Kajaki
- Height: 6 ft 1 in (1.85 m)

Bryan Parry (born 13 July 1992) is a Welsh actor. He was raised in Conwy, in North Wales. He is best known for his roles as Jonesy in Kajaki, Louis McQueen in Hollyoaks and Aaron Livesy in one episode of Emmerdale.

== Television work ==
He graduated at Italia Conti Academy of Theatre Arts in 2013 and was cast in the role of Aiden Russell in the UK television show Doctors.

His next role came soon after, as he was cast as Louis McQueen in Hollyoaks.

Parry's next television role came when he played the role of Freddie Preston, in series 2 of In the Flesh. His performance brought a lot of online positive comments via Twitter as Freddie had a very emotional ending.

He briefly portrayed an alternative Aaron Livesy in one episode of Emmerdale in December 2016.

== Personal life ==
Parry lives in London. He moved from south from North Wales to attend Italia Conti Academy of Theatre Arts. Before that, Parry studied Performing Arts at Coleg Llandrillo in Rhos-On-Sea.

== Filmography ==
=== Television ===
Year	Title	Role
2014	Doctors	Aiden Russell
2014	Hollyoaks	Louis McQueen
2014	In The Flesh	Freddie Preston
2016	Rillington Place	PC Everly
2016	Emmerdale	Aaron Livesy
2017	Doctors	Aaran Garvey
2019	Call the Midwife	Frank Tennant
2020	Casualty	Jono Bilson

=== Film ===
Year	Title	Role
2014	Jack Ryan: Shadow Recruit	Davies
2014	Pride	Kevin
2014	Kajaki	Jonesey

=== Theatre ===
Year	Title	Role
2015	Scuttlers	Sean
2015	Brittania Waves The Rules	Bilko
