= 2015 British Academy Scotland Awards =

- Date: 15 November 2015
- Site: Radisson Blu Hotel, Glasgow, Scotland
- Hosted by: Edith Bowman

Television coverage
- Network: Streaming webcast

The 25th British Academy Scotland Awards were held on 15 November 2015 at the Radisson Blu Hotel in Glasgow, honouring the best Scottish film and television productions of 2015. Presented by BAFTA Scotland, accolades are handed out for the best in feature-length film that were screened at British cinemas during 2015. The Nominees were announced on 13 October 2015. The ceremony was hosted by Edith Bowman.

== Winners and Nominees ==
Winners are listed first and highlighted in boldface.

Best Feature Film	Best Director Film/Television
**The Legend of Barney Thomson**: 16 Years Till Summer; What We Did on Our Holiday	**Donald Coutts – Katie Morag**: Gordon Anderson – Lovesick (Scrotal Recall); Robert Carlyle – The Legend of Barney Thomson
Best Actor in Film	Best Actress in Film
**David Elliot – Kajaki as Mark Wright**: Robert Carlyle – The Legend of Barney Thomson as Barney Thomson; David Tennant – What We Did on Our Holiday as Doug	**Emma Thompson – The Legend of Barney Thomson as Cemolina**: Elena Anaya – Swung as Alice López; Elizabeth McGovern – Swung as Dolly Adams
Best Actor in Television	Best Actress in Television
**Ken Stott – The Missing as Ian Garrett**: Mark Bonnar – Catastrophe as Chris; Peter Mullan – Stonemouth as Don Murston	**Sharon Rooney – My Mad Fat Diary as Rachel 'Rae' Earl**: Michelle Gomez – Doctor Who as Missy; Charlotte Spencer – Stonemouth as Ellie Murston
Best Writer Film/Television	Best Comedy/Entertainment Programme
**Gregory Burke – ‘71**: Tom Edge – Scrotal Recall; Steven Moffat – Doctor Who	**Mrs Brown's Boys – (BBC Scotland)**: Celtic Connections Opening Concert: Martyn Bennett's Grit – (BBC Scotland); Still Game Live – (BBC Scotland)
Best Factual Series	Best Features/ Factual Entertainment Programme
**Being Sixteen in 2014 – (BBC Scotland)**: Planet Oil – (BBC Scotland); Transplant Tales – (BBC Scotland)	**It Was Alright in the 70s – (Channel 4)**: Kirstie and Phil's Love It or List It – (Channel 4); Viva Variety – (BBC Scotland)
Best Single Documentary	Best Short Film
**The Bridge: Fifty Years Across The Forth – (BBC Scotland)**: Danny MacAskill: Riding The Ridge – (BBC Scotland); My New Hair – (STV)	**Mining Poems or Odes – Scottish Documentary Institute**: Dropping Off Michael – Jumpcut; Gasping – Hopscotch Films
Best Current Affairs	Best Children's Programme
**Low Pay Britain – Channel 4**: Epora – BBC One Scotland; Scotland Decides: The Big, Big Debate – BBC One	**The Dog Ate My Homework – (BBC Scotland)**: Katie Morag – (CBeebies); Teacup Travels – (CBeebies)
Best Game	Best Animation
**Distant Star: Revenant Fleet – Blazing Griffin**: Monstrum – Team Junkfish; Rituals – Tymon Zgainski	**Stems**: Gerascophobia; Scribbledub

=== Outstanding Contribution to Film & Television ===
- **Bill Paterson**

=== Outstanding Contribution to Craft ===
- David Balfour

=== Outstanding Contribution to Broadcasting ===
- **Dorothy Byrne**

== See also ==
- BAFTA Scotland
- 68th British Academy Film Awards
- 87th Academy Awards
- 21st Screen Actors Guild Awards
- 35th Golden Raspberry Awards
