= Operation Achilles =

NATO operation in Afghanistan

Coordinates: 32°04′24″N 64°50′02″E

- Part of the War in Afghanistan (2001–2021)
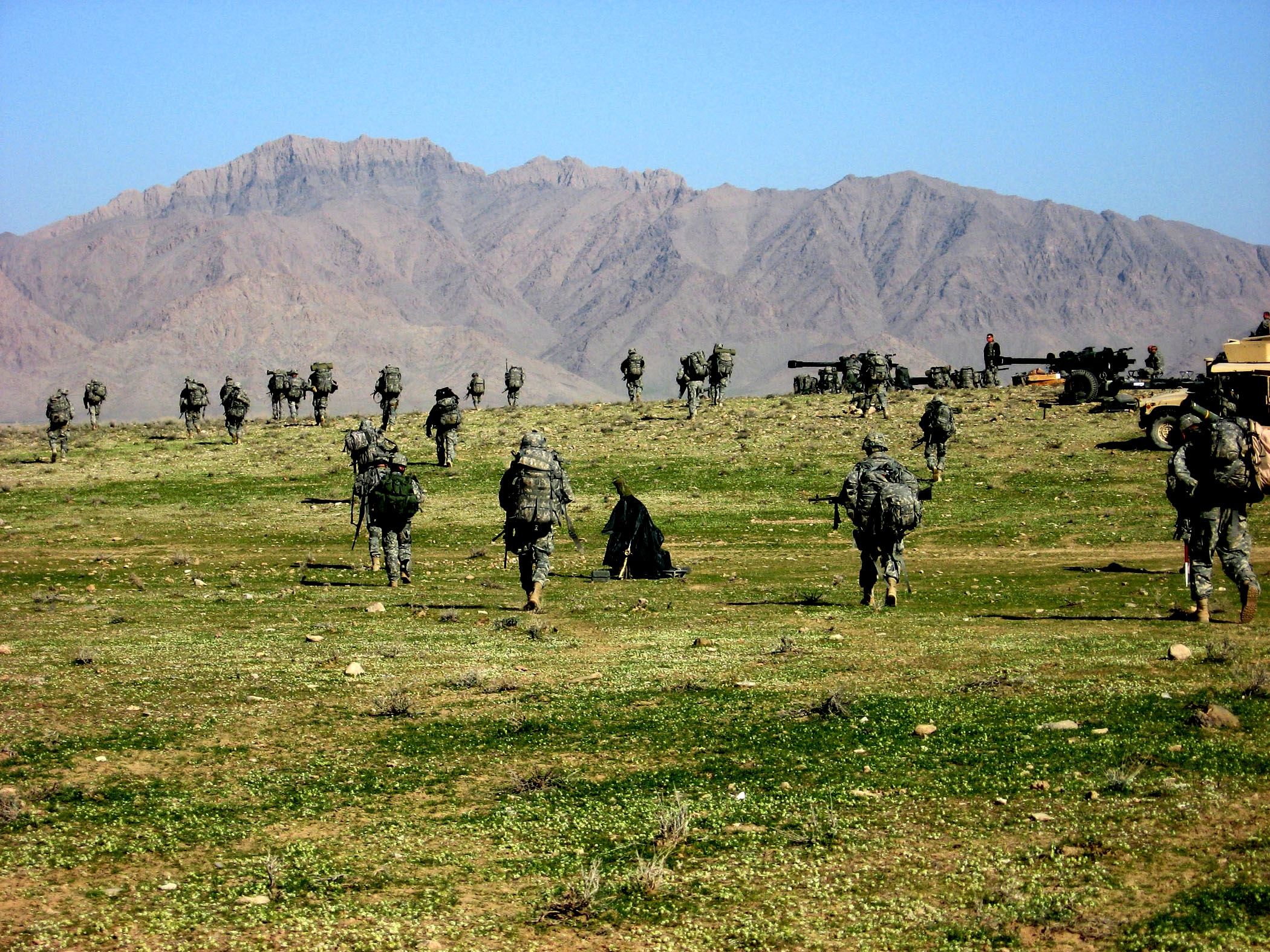
- 82nd Airborne Division patrol the Ghorak Valley of Helmand Province in southern Afghanistan during Operation Achilles, March 6.
Date	March 6 – May 30, 2007
Location	Helmand province, Afghanistan
Result	Coalition claims victory

Belligerents
Coalition: United Kingdom; United States; Islamic Republic of Afghanistan; Denmark; Canada; Netherlands; Poland	(Afghanistan) Taliban

Commanders and leaders
(United States) Gen.Dan McNeill (United Kingdom) Maj.-Gen. Jacko Page	(Afghanistan) Mullah Dadullah † (Afghanistan) Mullah Abdul Qassim

Strength
(United Kingdom) 4,200 (United States) 1,000 (Afghanistan) 1,000 (Denmark) 320 (Canada) 300 (Netherlands) 200 (Poland) 80	10,000 fighters (Taliban claim); ~4,000 insurgents (according to NATO sources)

Casualties and losses
(Afghanistan) 19 killed (United Kingdom) 6 killed (Canada) 6 killed (United States) 2 killed (Denmark) 1 killed (Netherlands) 1 killed Total: 35 killed	Per Coalition/NATO: Estimated between 750-1,000 killed 28 captured

Operation Achilles was a NATO operation, part of the War in Afghanistan. Its objective was to clear Helmand province of the Taliban. The operation began on March 6, 2007. The offensive is the largest NATO-based operation in Afghanistan to date. NATO officials reported that, contrary to previous operations, Taliban fighters were avoiding direct confrontation in favor of guerilla tactics.

It was led by British ISAF forces and focused on the Kajakai Dam and the towns in the area, which is a major power source for Afghanistan that had not been functioning for a number of years. One part of the mission was Operation Volcano, where British Royal Marines successfully cleared a large Taliban complex near the Kajakai Dam, as well as Operation Kryptonite which actually saw the clearing of the dam by allied forces.

== Background ==
On March 16, U.S. General Dan McNeill reported that NATO forces were battling insurgents in various places in Southern Afghanistan but that most of the rebel fighters were steering clear of Western troops. He also said that NATO would launch new operations against the Taliban during the spring and summer.

== Operation ==
Operation Volcano, part of Operation Achilles, saw British Royal Marines clear a Taliban base, consisting of 25 compounds, near the Kajaki hydroelectric dam. The Royal Marines received heavy fire from Taliban assault rifles, machine guns and rocket-propelled grenades. The Royal Marines systematically cleared the compounds and buildings, backed up by mortars and air support.

On April 3, United States and Afghan forces raided a compound in the Helmand province, after getting a tip-off that a junior Taliban commander was hiding there. Indeed, Taliban forces were present. Heavy fighting broke out, which left at least 10 Taliban dead and two captured. The coalition had no casualties. The fate of the junior commander remains unknown.

On April 30, 1,000 ISAF troops, alongside Afghan National Army ground forces, pushed northwards through the Sangin Valley driving the Taliban from Gereshk and the surrounding villages. It was reported that coalition troops killed more than 130 Taliban fighters, but thousands of Afghans staged a protest saying the victims were civilians. Backed by air support, the Taliban fighters were killed in two separate battles in the western province of Herat, according to a US military statement. As part of the operation, British Royal Engineers built company sized patrol bases for the Afghan National Security Forces.

The deaths triggered an angry protest - the second in the country in two days - over what local villagers claimed was the killing of civilians. Herat, bordering Iran, had been relatively safe until recently compared with the south and east where the Taliban are most active. Both battles were in the Zerkoh valley, south of Shindand district, where Western troops have a large base, and running into Farah province further south.

A total of 87 Taliban fighters were killed during a 14-hour battle with US-led troops and Afghan forces on Sunday. Another 49 Taliban, including two of their leaders, were killed two days earlier after a group of Taliban fired at a joint coalition and Afghan patrol in another part of the valley. However, local officials said that up to 51 civilians, including women and children, were among the dead.

== February–May timeline ==
February: Operation Volcano, a British operation to clear a Taliban base near the Kajaki hydroelectric dam.

May 1: southern Afghanistan NATO Commander Major-General Ton van Loon of the Netherlands was succeeded by Major-General Jacko Page of the United Kingdom.

May 13: Mullah Dadullah Lang, 2nd in command of the Taliban was killed in a clash with US, Afghan and NATO forces in Helmand Province. He was killed after coalition forces and Afghan forces found him leaving his hideout. Mullah Dadullah was the most experienced Commander the Taliban had at the time of his death.

May 18: Airstrikes targeted a convoy of suspected Taliban militants who had left a meeting in western Afghanistan, killing 14 and wounding 10, a provincial governor reported.

May 21: Taliban militants ambushed a joint U.S.coalition and Afghan patrol in a southern town near Helmand, sparking a battle and airstrikes that killed 25 suspected insurgents, U.S.officials said.

May 30: Operation Achilles ended and the new Operation Lastay Kulang began.
