= Operation Volcano =

2007, UK v. Taliban, Afghanistan

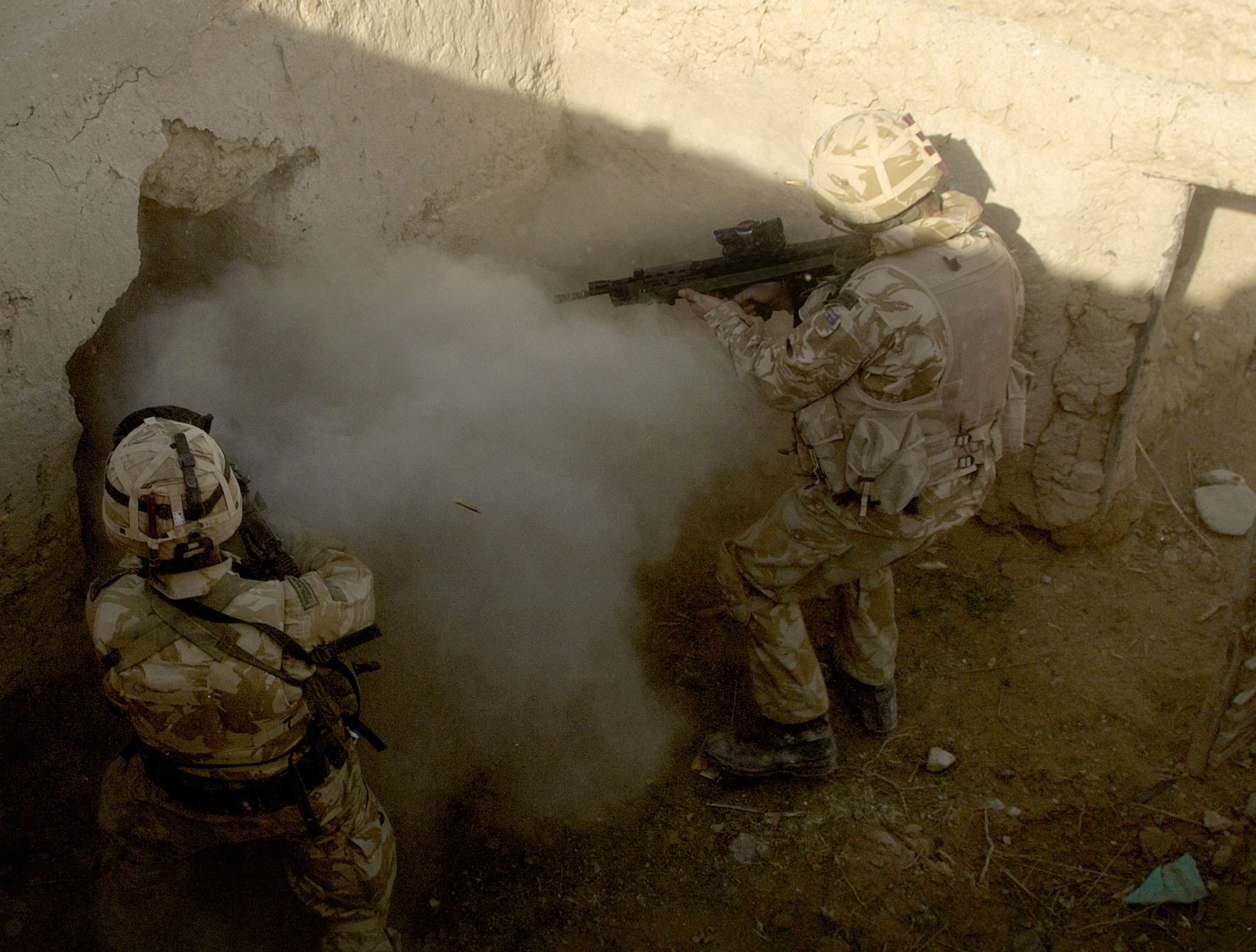
Mike Company of 42 Commando Royal Marines conducting room clearance during Operation Volcano.

Operation Volcano was a British operation to clear a village that the Taliban were using as a command and control node, consisting of 25 compounds, near the Kajaki hydroelectric dam in February 2007. The British troops came from 42 Commando, Royal Marines and 59 Commando Squadron Royal Engineers, a squadron drawn from the Royal Engineers but commando trained. During the operation, the marines received fire from Taliban forces further in the compounds and from the village of Chinah. They were killed by British aircraft and the Royal Marine's mortars. Operation Volcano was part of the March–May 2007 Operation Achilles.

Some parts of this operation are described in the documentary Ross Kemp in Afghanistan, which aired in 2008.

== See also ==
- War in Afghanistan (2001–2021)
- Operation Herrick
