= Kajaki =

Village in Helmand Province, Afghanistan

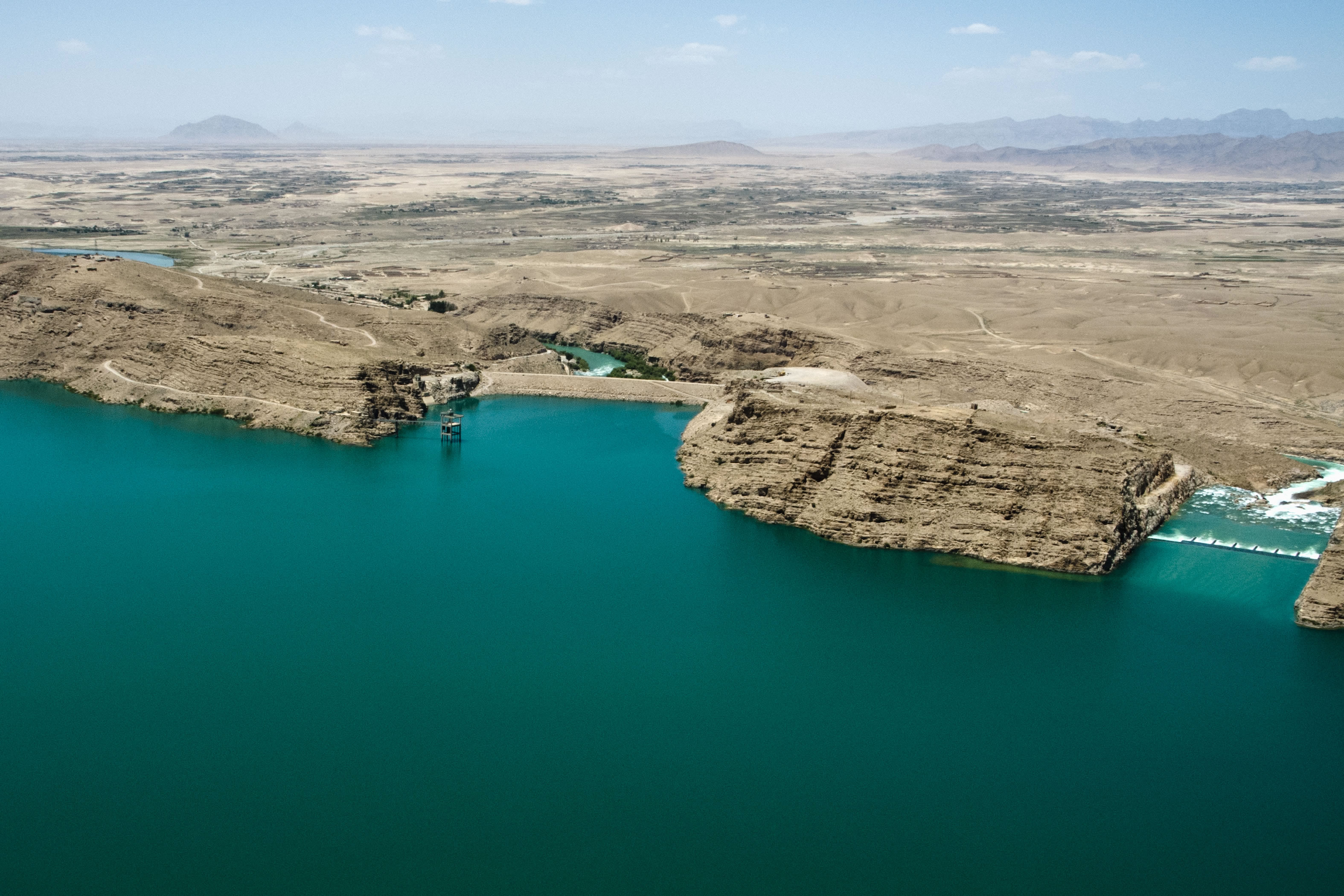
- The Kajaki Dam, located northeast of Kajaki village

- Location in Afghanistan
- Coordinates: 32°16′58″N 65°3′37″E
- Country: Afghanistan
- Province: Helmand Province
- District: Kajaki District
- Elevation: 3,077 ft (938 m)
- Time zone: UTC+4:30

Kajaki is a village in southern Afghanistan, and is split between two townsteads, Kajaki 'Olya, and Kajaki Sofla. It is the district centre of Kajaki District in Helmand Province. North east of the village is an important hydro power station for electricity and irrigation projects, the Kajaki Dam. The village itself hugs the east side of the Helmand River, right after it makes its first turn south, one km out from the dam. Kajaki is bordered by the town Payson to its west, Tangeye, an abandoned bazaar to its north, Shabez Kheyl, and Kanzi to its north west, all across the Helmand. Kajaki serves as the northern terminus of Route 611.

== History ==
It was announced in December 2006 that British Corporal Mark Wright would be posthumously awarded the George Cross for his actions after entering an unmarked minefield near Kajaki, in an attempt to save the lives of other injured soldiers which is the plot for the 2014 film Kajaki: The True Story.

On August 23, 2007, three British soldiers of the Royal Anglian Regiment were killed in a suspected friendly fire incident northwest of Kajaki. The soldiers were on patrol when they were attacked by Taliban insurgents. A pair of United States Air Force McDonnell Douglas F-15 Eagle fighter jets were called in to provide close air support dropping one 500 lb bomb in support of British forces; it is believed that this bomb exploded close to the British position killing three soldiers and injuring two others. On August 26, 2007, the Sunday Telegraph reported that American officials were investigating the possibility that the bombing was the result of a failure in the bombs guidance system rather than being the result of pilot error.

== Climate ==
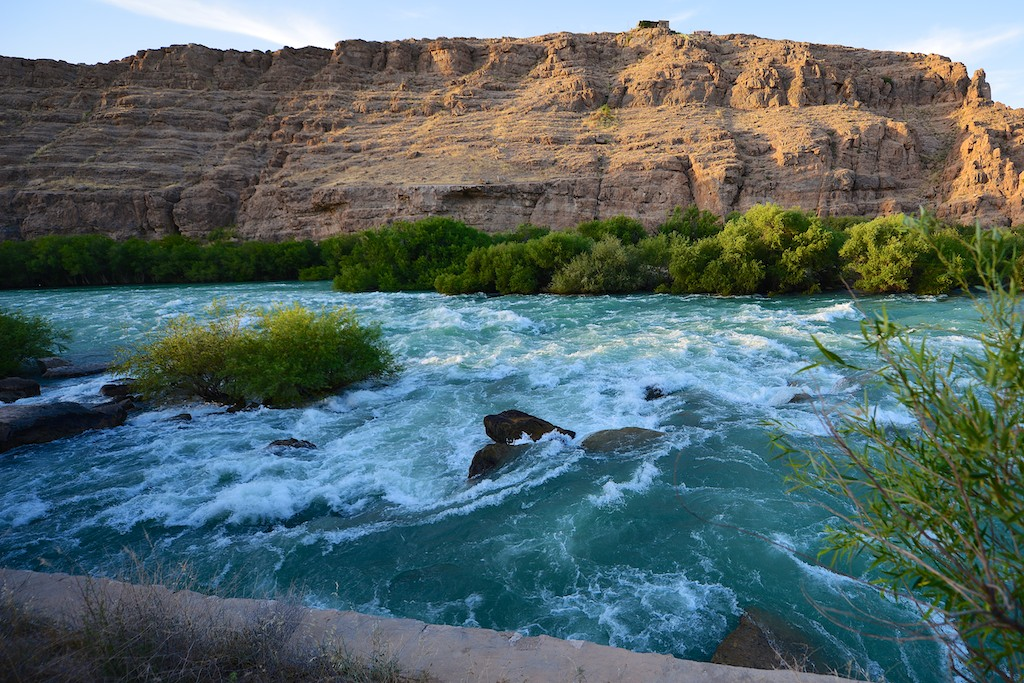
Helmand River

Kajaki has a hot desert climate (Köppen BWh), characterised by little precipitation and high variation between summer and winter temperatures. The average temperature in Kajaki is 18.3 °C, while the annual precipitation averages 163 mm. July is the hottest month of the year with an average temperature of 30.9 °C. The coldest month January has an average temperature of 5.5 °C.

Climate data for Kajaki
Month	Jan	Feb	Mar	Apr	May	Jun	Jul	Aug	Sep	Oct	Nov	Dec	Year
Mean daily maximum °C (°F)	12.0 (53.6)	14.2 (57.6)	21.0 (69.8)	27.5 (81.5)	33.6 (92.5)	39.2 (102.6)	40.3 (104.5)	38.8 (101.8)	34.1 (93.4)	28.1 (82.6)	20.3 (68.5)	14.6 (58.3)	27.0 (80.6)
Daily mean °C (°F)	5.5 (41.9)	7.7 (45.9)	13.7 (56.7)	19.3 (66.7)	24.5 (76.1)	29.3 (84.7)	30.9 (87.6)	29.0 (84.2)	23.5 (74.3)	17.9 (64.2)	11.2 (52.2)	7.2 (45.0)	18.3 (65.0)
Mean daily minimum °C (°F)	−0.9 (30.4)	1.2 (34.2)	6.4 (43.5)	11.2 (52.2)	15.4 (59.7)	19.4 (66.9)	21.6 (70.9)	19.2 (66.6)	13.0 (55.4)	7.7 (45.9)	2.2 (36.0)	−0.5 (31.1)	9.7 (49.4)
Source: Climate-Data.org

== See also ==
- List of dams and reservoirs in Afghanistan
- Helmand Province
- Kajaki Dam incident, 2006
