= Grishk =

Town in Helmand Province, Afghanistan

- City
- Location in Afghanistan
- Coordinates: 31°49′N 64°33′E
- Country: Afghanistan
- Province: Helmand
- District: Grishk

Government
  - Type: Municipality
- Elevation: 2,680 ft (817 m)

Population (2025)
  - City: 146,506
  - Urban: 12,468
  - Rural: 134,038
- Time zone: UTC+4:30 (Afghanistan Time)

Grishk (Note: Pashto: ګرشک, romanized: Grišk, pronounced [ˈgɾɪʃk]; Dari: گرشک, romanized: Girišk, pronounced [gɪˈɾɪʃk]) is a city in the southern Helmand Province of Afghanistan. It is within the jurisdiction of Grishk District and has an estimated population of 146,506 people.

Grishk is at an elevation of approximately 817 m (2,680 ft) above sea level. It is located about an hour's drive northeast of Lashkargah where the Kandahar–Herat Highway passes over the Helmand River, some 120 km (75 mi) northwest of Kandahar and about the same distance southeast of Delaram. Upstream lies the Kajaki Dam which diverts water to the Boghra Irrigation Canal, an essential infrastructure for the region's crops. Grishk Dam is also nearby. The city was originally built around a fort on the east bank of the Helmand River but was later rebuilt on the west.

Grishk has a number of bazaars, business centers, public parks, banks, hotels, restaurants, mosques, hospitals, universities, and places to play sports or relax. As part of Operation Moshtarak the British Army and Afghan workers constructed Route Trident, a road that connects Grishk with the provincial capital of Lashkargah. Grishk is also the southern terminus of Route 611. The area is irrigated by the Helmand and Arghandab Valley Authority.

== Climate ==
Grishk has a hot desert climate (Köppen BWh), characterised by little precipitation and high variation between summer and winter temperatures. The average temperature in Grishk is 19.6 °C (67.3 °F), while the annual precipitation averages 117 mm (4.6 in). Summers start in mid-May, last until late-September, and are extremely dry. July is the hottest month of the year with an average temperature of 32.2 °C (90.0 °F). The coldest month January has an average temperature of 7.0 °C (44.6 °F).

Climate data for Grishk
Month	Jan	Feb	Mar	Apr	May	Jun	Jul	Aug	Sep	Oct	Nov	Dec	Year
Mean daily maximum °C (°F)	14.0 (57.2)	16.7 (62.1)	23.4 (74.1)	28.5 (83.3)	34.9 (94.8)	40.1 (104.2)	41.3 (106.3)	39.6 (103.3)	35.1 (95.2)	29.2 (84.6)	21.6 (70.9)	16.0 (60.8)	28.4 (83.1)
Daily mean °C (°F)	7.0 (44.6)	9.7 (49.5)	15.7 (60.3)	20.3 (68.5)	25.9 (78.6)	30.3 (86.5)	32.2 (90.0)	29.9 (85.8)	24.6 (76.3)	18.9 (66.0)	12.3 (54.1)	8.0 (46.4)	19.6 (67.2)
Mean daily minimum °C (°F)	0.0 (32.0)	2.7 (36.9)	8.0 (46.4)	12.1 (53.8)	16.9 (62.4)	20.6 (69.1)	23.2 (73.8)	20.3 (68.5)	14.2 (57.6)	8.7 (47.7)	3.1 (37.6)	0.0 (32.0)	10.8 (51.5)
Source: Climate-Data.org

== Demographics ==
Grishk has an estimated population of 146,506 people. They are primarily Pashtuns followed by Hazaras and Tajiks. Grishk was under the control of Noorzai tribe during the Islamic Emirate of Afghanistan (1996–2001), and Mullah Mir Hamza an ethnic Pashtun from Noorzai tribe was the District governor of Grishk, while Mullah Mahmmad Azam an ethnic Pashtun from Noorzai tribe was the commander of Taliban forces in Grishk.

== Operation Enduring Freedom ==
In November 2003, an Afghan civilian Abdul Wahed died inside the U.S. Special Forces base in Grishk, after being exposed to torture. In April 2008 the 2nd Battalion 7th Marines, Echo Co, which was sent there to help support train the Afghan National Police, worked with the Danish and British military.

On December 4, 2008, two Danish soldiers were killed near Grishk.

In June 2017, the son of Taliban leader Hibatullah Akhundzada, named Hafiz Abdur-Rahman, committed a suicide attack on Afghan National Security Forces based in the city.

The city, along with other parts of Helmand province and the whole of Afghanistan, fell to Taliban forces as a result of the 2021 Taliban offensive.

== See also ==
- List of cities in Afghanistan
