= Operation Kryptonite =

2007 NATO military operation in Afghanistan

- Part of Operation Achilles, War in Afghanistan (2001–2021)
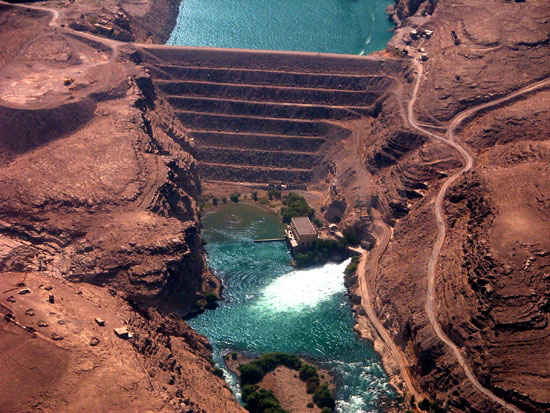
- The Kajakai Dam, coalition objective
Date	Early February to February 12, 2007
Location	Helmand province, Afghanistan
Result	Coalition victory: Repairs on the Kajakai Dam begin

Belligerents
Netherlands; United Kingdom; Islamic Republic of Afghanistan	(Afghanistan) Taliban

Commanders and leaders
(Netherlands) Maj.-Gen. Ton van Loon was in charge of Allied forces in the area and although absent from the fighting is credited with planning most of the assault	(Afghanistan) Mullah Manan †

Strength
300 total	700 insurgents, mostly foreign mujahideen that were Chechens, Tajiks and Uzbeks.

Casualties and losses
None	15 killed 10 captured

Operation Kryptonite was the name given to a joint operation including the United Kingdom, the Netherlands and the Afghan National Army, representing the ISAF and NATO. The operation itself was part of Operation Achilles. The intention of the operation was to clear the area around the Kajakai Dam, belonging to Taliban fighters so this important power generation station could be reopened. Sporadic fighting had been occurring around the dam and the Taliban controlled the town of Musa Qala for around ten days as the Allied forces attempted to gain a foothold in the area so they could begin the offensive.

== The battle ==
Allied Troops launched their offensive over the weekend of the 10th and 11th, little pre-raid bombing took place as to avoid damaging infrastructure in and around the dam. Destruction of the dam would have had grave results for both sides and the Afghan people. This may have been a major reason for the Taliban to not destroy it as they fled. Allied troops came under heavy small arms fire and light heavy arms fire including RPGs and bombs as they advanced towards the dam. Towards the end of the battle, it became obvious that although outnumbered, the ability of allied troops to cut the enemy's supplies was more demoralizing as Taliban forces started to flee the field of battle. Early Monday morning, allied forces carried out a pre-dawn bombing raid on Taliban forces located approximately in between the dam and the town, killing the Taliban commander Mullah Manan. This killing was seen as the straw that broke the camel's back, as not long after chaos ensued amongst the Taliban forces as they made a hasty retreat. This quote from Colonel Tom Collins describes the desperate Taliban retreat:

During this action ... Taliban extremists resorted to the use of human shields. Specifically, using local Afghan children to cover as they escaped out of the area,

— Colonel Tom Collins, NATO spokesman.

== Aftermath ==
Although the Taliban never intended to topple the dam they still resorted to a semi-scorched earth policy. They destroyed or dismantled many of the complex mechanical components of the dam as they fled the field, to delay a NATO advance. Seizing of this dam and getting it up and running again was of great importance to the Allied troops, as restoring much needed power to the area would win support for the allied troops and the Afghan mission overall from the locals, as well as provide jobs in the energy sector.

NATO reported that it suffered no casualties in the fighting, and that the number they killed or wounded is unknown. They did say however that they captured ten suspected militants during and after the battle. NATO also claims that no civilians were killed in the action (despite NATO claims that human shields were used), although this is refuted by local leaders.
