= Boghra Irrigation Canal =

Canal in Afghanistan

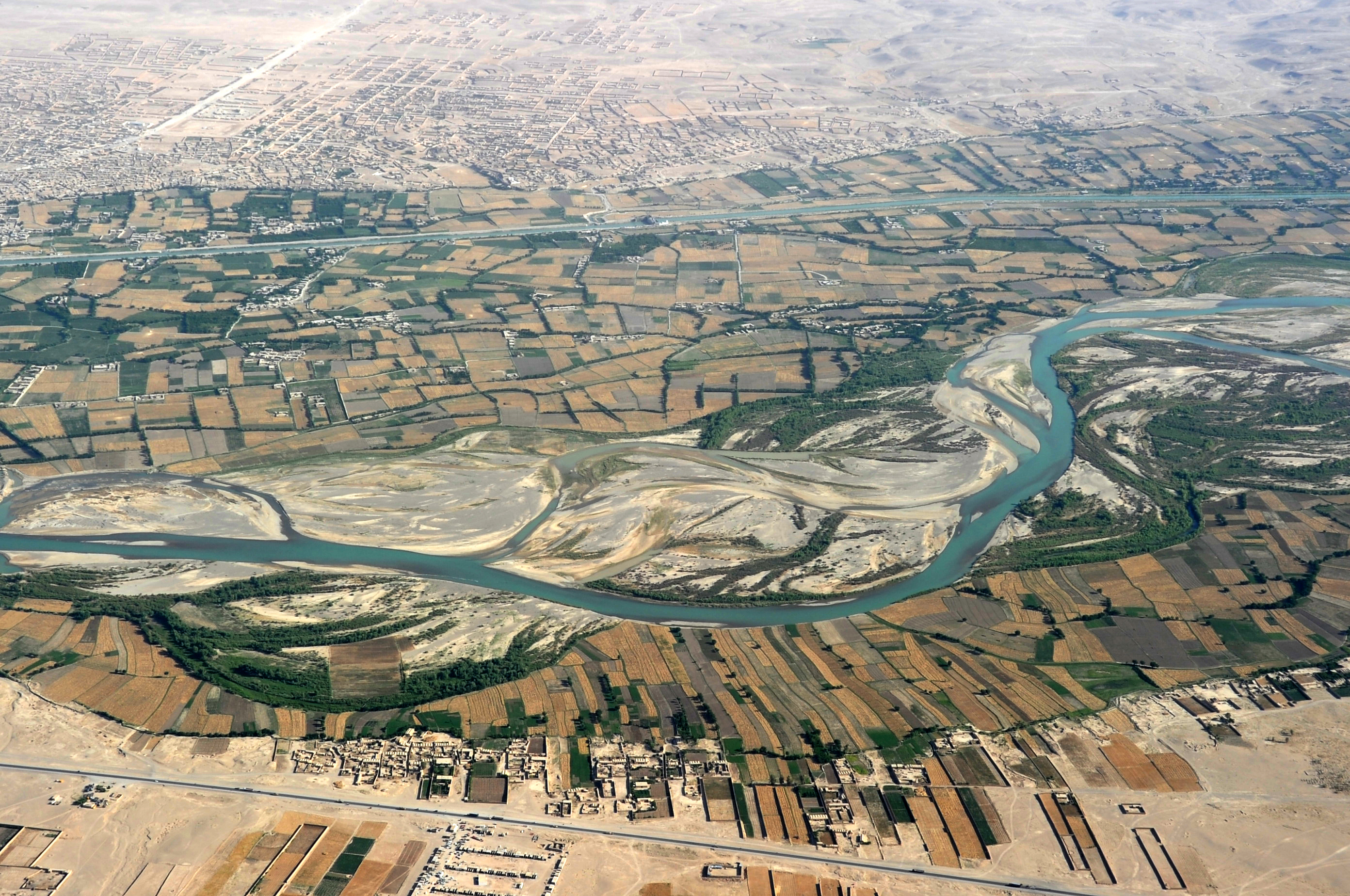
Helmand River with the Boghra canal in the middle distance, near the town of Grishk

Boghra Irrigation Canal or Nahr-e Bughra is a canal some 155 kilometres long in central Afghanistan in Helmand Province, serving to divert water from the Helmand River and the Arghandab for farmland. The Afghan government received US funding of $21 million on November 23, 1949, for the canal system. The Boghra, Shamalon and Marja canals were completed by 1954. It is controlled by the Helmand and Arghandab Valley Authority.
