= David Elliot (actor) =

Scottish actor

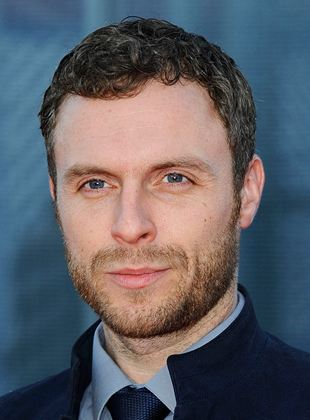
- Born: 27 July 1981 (age 45); Edinburgh, Scotland
- Occupation: Actor
- Years active: 2007–present

David Elliot (born 27 July 1981) is a Scottish actor best known for his role as Mark Wright in the film Kajaki in which he was awarded the best actor accolade at the 2015 British Academy Scotland Awards. He has also appeared in The Inland Road (2016), Clique (2017), Bulletproof (2018), The Cry (2018), The Liberator (2020), Crime (2023) and Vigil (2023).

== Filmography ==
=== Television ===
Year	Title	Character	Production	Notes
2011	River City	Simon	BBC	2 episodes
2011	Rosamunde Pilcher's Shades of Love	Maitre'd	ZDF	1 episode
2012	Lip Service	Dan	BBC	1 episode
2013	Outlander	Army Doctor	Starz	1 episode
2013	Emmerdale	Dr Adrian Carrington	ITV	2 episodes
2016	Still Game	Andrew Gillespie	BBC	1 episode
2017	Clique	DS Tom Gillespie	BBC	2 episodes
2018 - 2020	Bulletproof	Jonesy	Sky One	12 episodes
2018	The Cry	Henry McCallum	BBC	3 episodes
2020	The Liberator	Major General Robert Frederick	Netflix	2 episodes
2023	Crime	DI Tommy Stark	ITV	6 episodes
2023	Vigil	Sutherland	BBC	6 episodes
2024	FBI: International	Krisztofer Havel	CBS	1 episode
2025	Talamasca: The Secret Order	Houseman	AMC Studios	1 episode

=== Film ===
Year	Title	Character	Notes
2008	Eyes on the Street	Dougie	BBC Films
2011	Last Order	Sam	Short film
2011	The Ambitious Potato	Steven	Short film
2011	Euphoria	Dan	Short film
2013	The Wee Man	John Banks	Feature film
2013	Ellipse	David	Short Film
2013	The New Start	Andy	Short film
2013	Still Waters	PC Dunne	Feature film
2014	Torn	Christopher Gollop	Feature film
2014	Bucket	Cas	Short film
2014	Sleeping Beauty	Wilhelm	Feature film
2014	Film: The Movie	Detective McDonald	Feature film
2014	Kajaki	Mark Wright	Feature film
2014	The Romance Class	Thomas	Short film
2015	The Return	Manny	Feature film
2016	The Inland Road	Will	Feature film
2017	Two For Joy	Cam	Feature film
2018	Down a Dark Hall	Robert Gordon	Feature film

== Theatre ==
Year	Title	Role	Theatre	Director	Notes
2006	The Life of Christ	Simon Peter	Cutting Edge		
2006	Macbeth	MacDuff	Cutting Edge		
2006	Death of a Salesman	Biff	Adam House Theatre		
2007	The Lass wi the Muckle Mou	Wullie	Theatre Alba	Charles Nowosielski	play by Alexander Reid
2008	Saint Joan	Dunois	Theatre Alba	Charles Nowosielski	play by George Bernard Shaw
2009	Hangover	Danny	Edinburgh Fringe		
2010	Decky Does a Bronco	O'Neill	Traverse Theatre	Ben Harrison	play by Douglas Maxwell
2011	Kicking Snow	Graham	Young Vic		
2012	Lucretia	Collatinus	Theatre 503		
2013	Blood and Honour	James	Arts Theatre		

== Awards ==
Year	Nominated Work	Awards	Category	Result
2015	Kajaki	British Academy Scotland Awards	Best Actor (Film)	Won
