= Mark Wright (British Army soldier) =

Soldier in the British Army and a recipient of the George Cross

Corporal Mark Wright GC
- Corporal Mark Wright
- Born: 22 April 1979; Edinburgh, Scotland
- Died: 6 September 2006 (aged 27); Helmand Province, Afghanistan
- Military career
- Allegiance: United Kingdom
- Branch: British Army
- Service years: 1999–2006
- Rank: Corporal
- Unit: Parachute Regiment
- Conflicts: The Troubles; Iraq War; War in Afghanistan
- Awards: George Cross

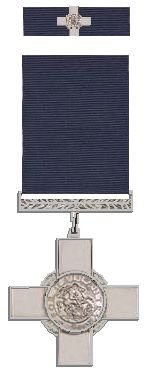
George Cross and its ribbon bar

Mark William Wright, GC (22 April 1979 – 6 September 2006) was a soldier in the British Army and a recipient of the George Cross. He died in Helmand Province, Afghanistan, after entering a minefield in an attempt to save the lives of other injured soldiers. His actions were posthumously recognised with the award of the George Cross on 14 December 2006, and gazetted the next day. Wright had served in the 3rd Battalion, Parachute Regiment in Northern Ireland, Iraq and Afghanistan.

== Early life ==
Before he joined the military, Wright lived in Edinburgh.

== Military career ==
Wright joined the British Army in January 1999. After training, he joined the 3rd Battalion, Parachute Regiment in October 1999. He completed three tours in Northern Ireland within three years, and was Number One in a mortar detachment by 2003. He was deployed to Iraq with his battalion in May 2003. Back in the United Kingdom, he was promoted to corporal. He became a Mortar Fire Controller, and was deployed to Helmand Province with his battalion in May 2006.

=== Death ===
On 6 September 2006, Wright was on routine patrol in the region of Kajaki in Helmand Province. He entered the unmarked minefield with a small team after another soldier stepped on a landmine. While the first casualty was being tended to, further landmines detonated as a landing space was cleared for a helicopter evacuation attempt, causing severe injuries to several others. Wright remained in the minefield, and ordered others out, but he was himself injured by another mine while making his way to the helicopter. He maintained the morale of the other wounded soldiers despite his serious injuries, including an impromptu rendition of "Happy Birthday" for a comrade also immobilised by the blasts. Wright later died of his wounds during the flight to the field hospital, after a wait of many hours for the International Security Assistance Force (ISAF) to scramble an appropriate rescue aircraft.

== Reaction ==
On 14 January 2008, The Guardian reported (based on a pre-publication copy of the board of enquiry's report) that Wright might have been saved if the British Army had had adequate numbers of winch-equipped helicopters available. Most winches had been withdrawn due to a fault in a sub-system, meaning that Wright and his colleagues had to wait over five hours before being evacuated by a United States' Black Hawk helicopter. The military report also criticised the facts that: the British troops did not have a map of the minefield, although they were available; British troops had to provide their own mine extraction kits; and that radio problems on the day led to communications breakdown.

In October 2008 an inquest into the deaths of Wright and other personnel involved in the incident heard further details of the circumstances. A platoon commander had heard from American private security contractors that there were mines in the area, and passed that information on; however, the map used by the troops still showed it as being clear of hazards. The first soldier to trigger a mine was Corporal Stuart Hale. This was reported to (then) Lieutenant Colonel Stuart Tootal, commanding officer of 3 PARA at the time (since promoted to colonel). He requested a Black Hawk helicopter from the joint helicopter base in Kandahar, officers there were reluctant to send a helicopter because of the risk of further mines being present. When bomb-disposal officers told Tootal that it could take 12 hours to clear the mines, he decided to send a British Chinook to attempt a rescue. This helicopter was not equipped with a winch, so would have to touch down at least its two back wheels to pick the men up. Sergeant Stuart Pearson attempted to clear sufficient area for the helicopter to touchdown, but as he rejoined the rest of the platoon, he triggered a further mine, causing further casualties. The helicopter then arrived and touched down successfully, but the soldiers were now unwilling to risk further detonations, and refused to move toward it. As the helicopter took off again, Wright triggered a further mine, possibly because he, or some equipment, was moved by the downdraft or other effect of the helicopter. Three soldiers had lost legs, and four had other serious injuries. Wright, himself wounded in the arm, neck and chest crawled across the minefield to administer morphine and other first aid measures to his comrades. Two Black Hawk helicopters finally arrived to extract the men, and Wright died in one of these en route to Camp Bastion. Tootal believes that the additional casualties could have been avoided if a Black Hawk had been despatched in the first instance.

== Mark Wright House ==
On 17 August 2009, the first purpose-built Army Recovery Centre to be set up in the United Kingdom was officially opened and named "Mark Wright House" in honour of Wright. The centre has been jointly developed by the army, and charities Erskine and Help for Heroes, and is based at Erskine's Edinburgh Home in Gilmerton. The centre provides a dedicated 12-bed unit for army personnel recovering from injuries, and is designed to ease the transition from medical care at centres such as Headley Court to a return home. The facility also provides facilities for the families of the injured personnel.

== Legacy ==
Scottish actor David Elliot portrayed Mark Wright in the 2014 film Kajaki, which depicted the events at Kajaki dam. The film was released in the United States on Netflix under the title of Kilo Two Bravo.

== Mark Wright Memorial Degree Team ==
Mark Wright was a Freemason and a member of Lodge St Clair No 349, in Edinburgh. A group of Scottish Freemasons established the Mark Wright Memorial Degree team and toured Scottish masonic lodges performing degree ceremonies with the purpose of raising money for military veteran charities. The group became the starting point for a new Lodge, Kajaki No 1848, which was chartered by the Grand Lodge of Scotland and consecrated in 2018. Its first Right Worshipful Master was Bob Wright, the father of Mark Wright.
