= Kajaki District =

Kajaki کجکی
- District
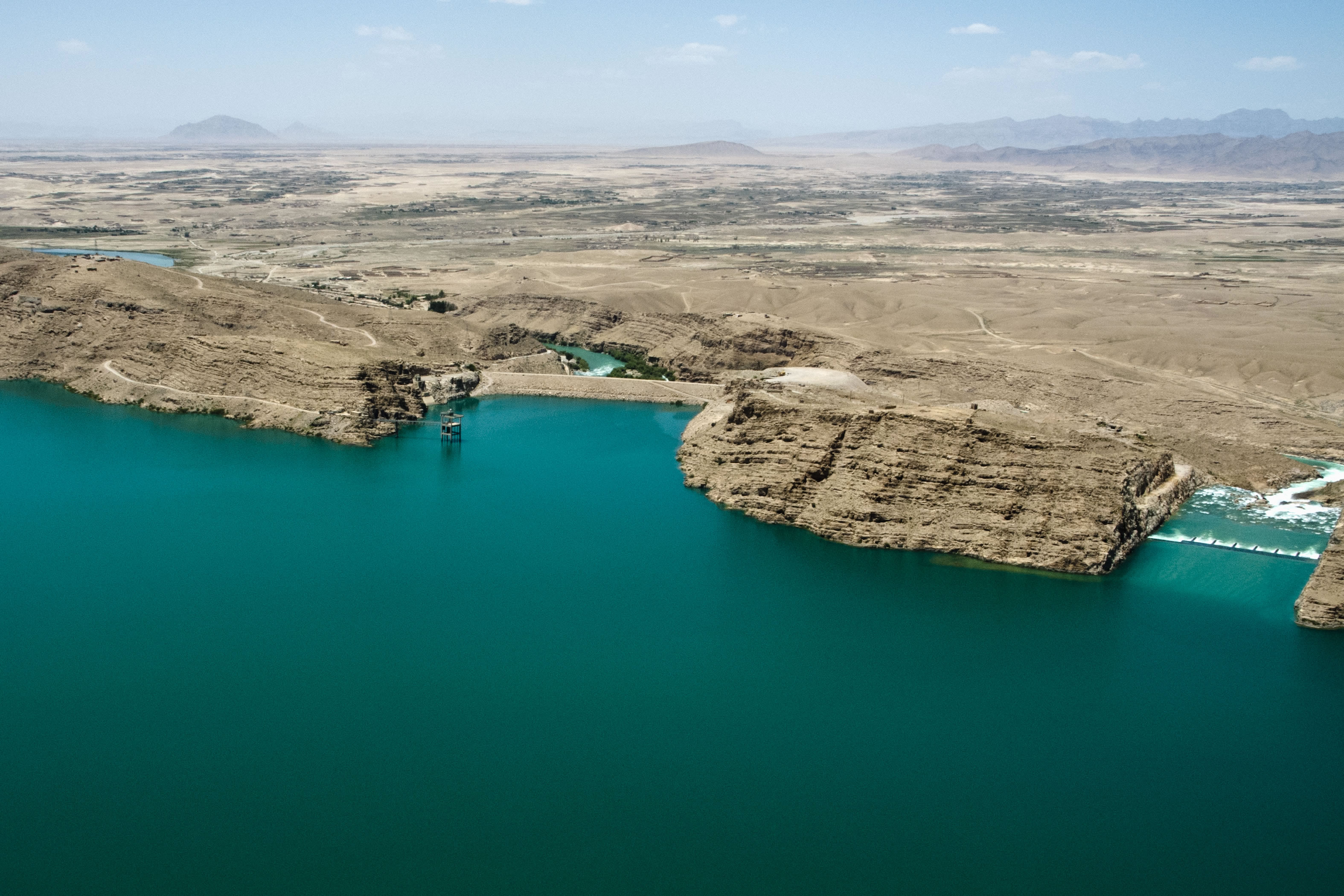
- The Kajaki Dam is located in this district.

- Location within Afghanistan
- Coordinates: 32°16′13″N 65°05′37″E
- Country: Afghanistan
- Province: Helmand Province

Population (2012)
  - Total: 69,300

Kajaki (Pashto: کجکی) is a district in the Northeast of Helmand Province, Afghanistan. Its population is by a vast majority Pashtun, and stood at 69,300 in 2012. The district centre is the village of Kajaki. Route 611 passes through the district to the district center.

== See also ==
- Districts of Afghanistan
