= Helmand and Arghandab Valley Authority =

Agency of the Afghan government

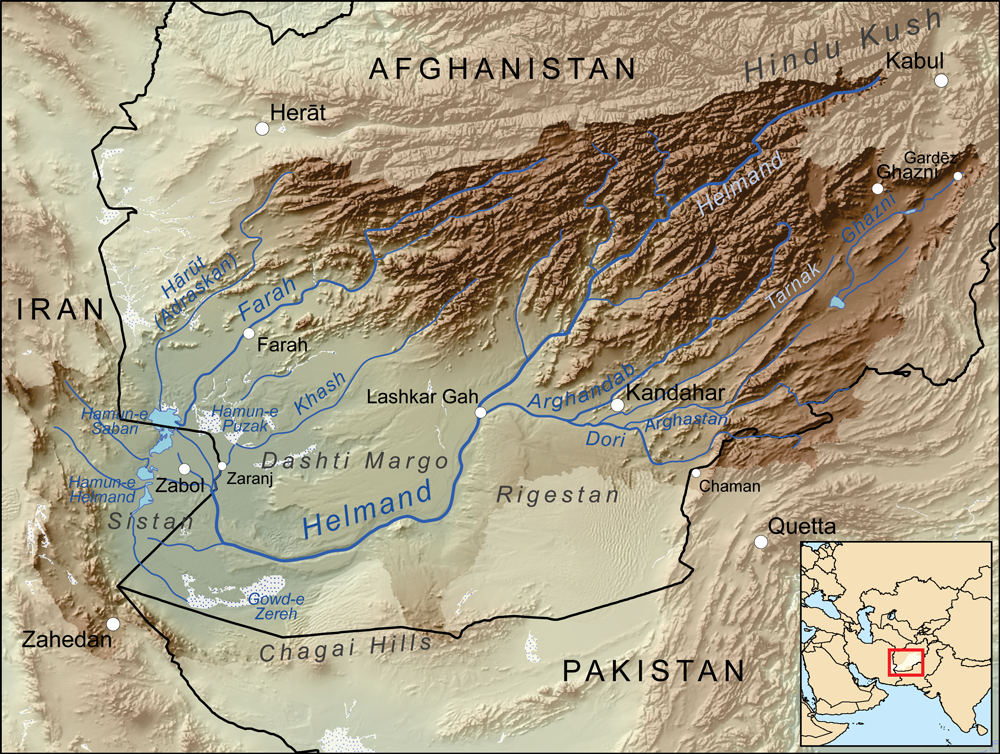
Map of the Helmand River drainage basin including the Arghandab River tributary

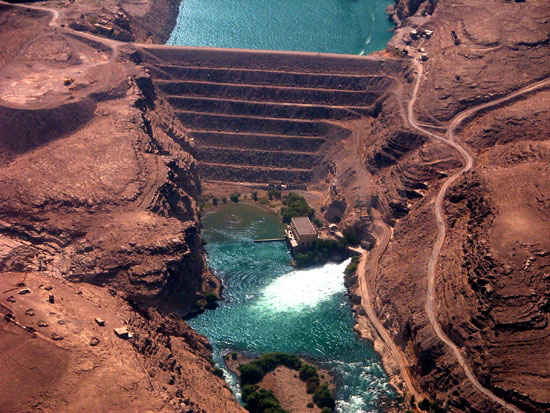
The Kajakai Dam on the Helmand River, one of the major dams controlled by the HAVA

The Helmand and Arghandab Valley Authority (HAVA) based in Lashkar Gah, Afghanistan, originally named the Helmand Valley Authority (HVA) until its expansion in 1965, was established on December 4, 1952, as an agency of the Afghan Government. The agency was modeled on the Tennessee Valley Authority in the United States, with a remit covering lands in the provinces of Farah, Ghazni, Helmand, Herat, and Kandahar.

The HAVA is overseen by the Afghan Ministry of Agriculture, Irrigation and Livestock (previously the Ministry of Agriculture and Irrigation).

== History ==
The HAVA was created to manage the economic development of the Helmand and Arghandab valleys, primarily through irrigation and agricultural land development along the Helmand River and the Arghandab River, in a plan which was forecast to be of primary importance to the future economy of Afghanistan. Before the outbreak of conflict in the late 1970s, the area irrigated by the HAVA produced a large proportion of Afghanistan's grain and cotton and was a major source of foreign exchange through exports. The area of agricultural land under irrigation more than halved between 1979 and 2002 to around 1,500,000 hectares (5,800 sq mi), although this has since been increased.

The project received major loans from the Export–Import Bank of the United States and, although around 20% of all Afghan Government expenditure went into funding the HVA and HAVA during the 1950s and into the 1960s, it was generally seen as a US-led project. It resulted, in the words of historian Arnold J. Toynbee in "a piece of America inserted into the Afghan Landscape. ... The new world they are conjuring up out of the desert at the Helmand River's expense is to be an America-in-Asia."

=== 2000s ===
In 2005, it was reported that, following a United States Agency for International Development funded project to build six reservoirs in Lashkar Gah, the HAVA would manage the provision of fresh water connections to the city's residents and the collection of the associated fees to keep the system maintained. The city had been without fresh water for the previous 30 years due to the contamination of the Helmand River.

During the Helmand province campaign, the Operation Tethys initiative by the British Royal Engineers 170 (Infrastructure Support) Group led to repairs being carried out to the HAVA's irrigation systems between 2010 and 2012 at 30 sites.

During 2011, it was reported that work was being started on a Helmand River Basin Study and Master Plan (HRBMP) to rebuild the capacity of the HAVA with funding from the British Department for International Development.

=== Present day ===
Today, the irrigation system managed by the HAVA is regarded as one of the country's most important capital resources and vital for maintaining and expanding agricultural production in the region.

As of March 2012, its director is Haji Khan Agha.

== Development ==
The development of the Helmand Valley was initiated by the Government of Afghanistan in 1946. In addition to irrigation and land development it also included elements of flood control and power supply, improvements to farming practices and equipment, health, education and road connections and the resettlement of some 5,500 nomadic and landless families into the area. It focused around irrigation supplied from the waters of the Arghandab (Dahla) Dam, completed in 1952, and the Kajaki Dam on the River Helmand, completed in 1953, which were both constructed by a local subsidiary of Morrison Knudsen, the builders of the Hoover Dam. It resulted in one of the world's major desert irrigation schemes, with water supplied through the Boghra, Shamalan, and Darweshan canals.

=== Government involvement ===
The US Government was officially involved in the project from 1949 until the Soviet invasion in 1979. Between 1949 and 1971, the US financed eight dams on the Helmand River. From 1960, the Agency for International Development and its predecessor, the Technical Cooperation Agency, spent $80 million assisting with 25 projects and the HAVA became a showcase for the US foreign aid program.

The earliest initiatives to build a modern irrigation system in the region began in 1935, with financial support from the Japanese Government though until World War II. The German Government had also provided assistance.

=== Areas irrigated by the HAVA ===
In Helmand Province, the areas of Nad Ali, Marja, Shamalon, Darweshan, Khanishin, Seraj, Girishk, Sanguin-Kajakai, Musa Qala and Nowzad are all irrigated by the HAVA, as are the areas of Maiwand, Dund-Daman, Arghandab and Panjwayi in Kandahar Province.

=== Issues ===
While the development of the Helmand valley resulted in considerable gains in agricultural production and raised average farm incomes tenfold, there have also been problems. In particular, by 1975, over-irrigation and poor drainage had led to waterlogging and salination, seriously damaging the soil in some places. Work to mitigate this was interrupted by the Soviet invasion. Following the overthrow of the Najibullah Government in 1992 and aided by the irrigation, the Helmand valley region has become a major area for the cultivation of the opium poppy, a crop which had been largely suppressed by the HAVA in the 1950s.

Irrigation of the area has also significantly reduced the water flowing from the Helmand River into Lake Hamun and this, together with drought, has been cited as a key reason for the severe damage to the ecology of the lake region, much of which has degenerated since 1999 from a wetland of international importance into salt flats.

== See also ==
- Opium production in Afghanistan
- Desert greening
