= Route 611 (Afghanistan) =

Road in Afghanistan

Location
- Country: Afghanistan

Highway system
- Transport in Afghanistan

Route 611 is the main road between Nahri Saraj District and Kajaki District in Helmand Province, Afghanistan. The southern terminus is at Highway 1 in the town of Grishk and the northern terminus is in the village of Kajaki. The road is approximately 100 kilometers long and passes through the town of Sangin.

American Marines from the 3rd Battalion, 5th Marines were deployed in 2010 to provide security for the 100 km of roadway to ensure the completion of the project.
