= Kajaki Dam incident =

British army accident in Afghanistan

The Kajaki Dam Incident occurred on the 6 September 2006, when 4 Soviet anti-personnel mines, left over from the Soviet occupation of Afghanistan, were detonated by soldiers of the 3rd Battalion, Parachute Regiment, British Army. One soldier was fatally wounded, and seven others sustained serious injuries during the blasts.

== Background ==
The troops were based at "Normandy" outpost in Helmand. They were there to protect the Afghan village of Kajaki from the Taliban militant group.

== Incident ==
In the early hours of 6 September 2006, Taliban activity was spotted in the form of a checkpoint being set up by armed militants. Corporal Stu Pearson, who was commander of the Normandy outpost, was alerted by Lance Corporal Stewart Hale to the activity, and was informed that Hale could potentially engage the militants with his sniper rifle, but they saw a more suitable vantage point across the dam.

As they traversed the landscape towards their vantage point, LCpl Hale stood on and triggered a land mine, suffering an amputation of his lower right leg and serious injuries to his right hand, including the loss of a finger; he initially thought he had been hit by a mortar shell. The remaining paratroopers began to administer first aid and a tourniquet while calling for support from any surrounding units and a winch from a UH-60 Black Hawk helicopter. This was important, as a Black Hawk has a winch to lift injured up and the downforce of the blades is low, avoiding any danger of triggering more mines in the minefield. A Black Hawk was not available at the time, so a Chinook helicopter was dispatched. As more troopers arrived, Hale was moved onto a small embankment on the side of the riverbed.

Pearson went to retrieve a water bottle left at the scene where Hale was being treated, and triggered another explosion. The downdraught of the arriving Chinook's blades caused a third mine to be detonated causing further injuries.

== Aftermath ==
Five of the British paratroopers involved in the incident sued the British Ministry of Defence for "breaching their duty of care". It was settled without trial with £1.7 million being awarded to Stuart Pearson, who used £600,000 for his state-of-the-art prosthetics. Compensation was also won for Mark Wright's family and Andrew Barlow.

A number of those involved in the incident received gallantry awards:

George Cross

- Corporal Mark Wright, The Parachute Regiment†

George Medal

- Lance Corporal Paul Hartley, Royal Army Medical Corps
- Fusilier Andrew Barlow, The Royal Regiment of Fusiliers

Queen's Gallantry Medal

- Corporal Stuart Pearson, The Parachute Regiment

Queen's Commendation for Bravery in the Air

- Senior Airman Jason Broline, United States Air Force
- Staff Sergeant Cameron Hystad, United States Air Force

== In popular culture ==
The 2014 British film Kajaki is based on the Kajaki dam incident.
