= Kajaki (film) =

2014 film directed by Paul Katis

Kajaki: The True Story
- UK theatrical release poster
- Directed by: Paul Katis
- Written by: Tom Williams
- Produced by: Paul Katis; Andrew de Lotbinière
- Starring: David Elliot
- Cinematography: Chris Goodger
- Edited by: Brin
- Production company: Pukka Films
- Distributed by: Alchemy Releasing
- Release dates: 12 November 2014 (Premiere); 28 November 2014
- Running time: 108 minutes
- Country: United Kingdom
- Language: English
- Box office: $34,017

Kajaki: The True Story, released in North America as Kilo Two Bravo, is a 2014 British war docu-drama film directed by Paul Katis in his feature debut, written by Tom Williams, and produced by Katis and Andrew de Lotbiniere.

The plot is based on the Kajaki Dam incident, involving Mark Wright and a small unit of British soldiers positioned near the Kajaki Dam, in Helmand province, Afghanistan.

== Cast ==
- Mark Stanley as Tug
- David Elliot as Mark Wright
- Scott Kyle as Stu Pearson
- Benjamin O'Mahony as Stuart Hale
- Bryan Parry as Jonesy
- Liam Ainsworth as Ken Barlow
- Andy Gibbins as Smudge
- John Doughty as Dave Prosser
- Paul Luebke as Jay Davis
- Thomas Davison as Jarhead
- Grant Kilburn as Alex Craig
- Malachi Kirby as Snoop
- Alistair Cook as Spud McMellon
- Abe Dababneh as Kajaki Jon
- Felipe Cabezas as Kajaki Mike
- Ryan W. Sadi as Kyle Minchew
- Hazem Alagha as Steven "Bombhead" Watson
- Jon-Paul Bell as Luke Mauro
- Malachi Kirby as Snoop
- Robert Mitchell as Faz

== Production ==
The film was shot on location at Al-Kafrein, Jordan, as a stand-in for Afghanistan.

== Release ==
Kajaki premiered on 12 November 2014 at London's Vue Cinema in Leicester Square and was attended by cast, crew and veterans. The film was released in the United Kingdom on 28 November 2014 and in the United States on 13 November 2015.

== Reception ==
=== Box office ===
Kajaki grossed $7,891 in the United Kingdom, and $26,126 in other territories for a worldwide total of $34,017.

=== Critical response ===
On review aggregator Rotten Tomatoes it has an approval rating of 100% based on 28 reviews, with an average rating of 7.6/10. The website's critical consensus states: "Kilo Two Bravo honours its fact-based story with an almost unbearably tense drama that captures the horrors -- and the human cost -- of modern warfare."

Andrew Pulver, in a review for the The Guardian, gave the film 4 stars out of 5. While they criticized the film's avoidance of the political ramifications of the subject matter, they praised the film's "lacerating power" and atmosphere of "claustrophobia".

Alan Zilberman gave the film 3.5 stars out of 4 in a review for The Washington Post. They praised the film's "unflinching realism" and called it "a brutal reminder of what it means when the war machines of an earlier generation are left behind to be cleaned up by the next."

=== Accolades ===
At the 2015 BAFTA Scotland Awards (ceremony 15 November 2015) David Elliot won as Best Actor in Film. At the 2015 British Independent Film Awards (ceremony 6 December 2015) Paul Katis (director/producer) and Andrew de Lotbinière (producer) won as Producer of the Year for work on this film and were also nominated at the 2015 British Academy Film Awards (ceremony 8 February 2015) as Outstanding Debut by a British Writer, Director or Producer.
