= Kajaki Dam =

Dam in Helmand, Afghanistan

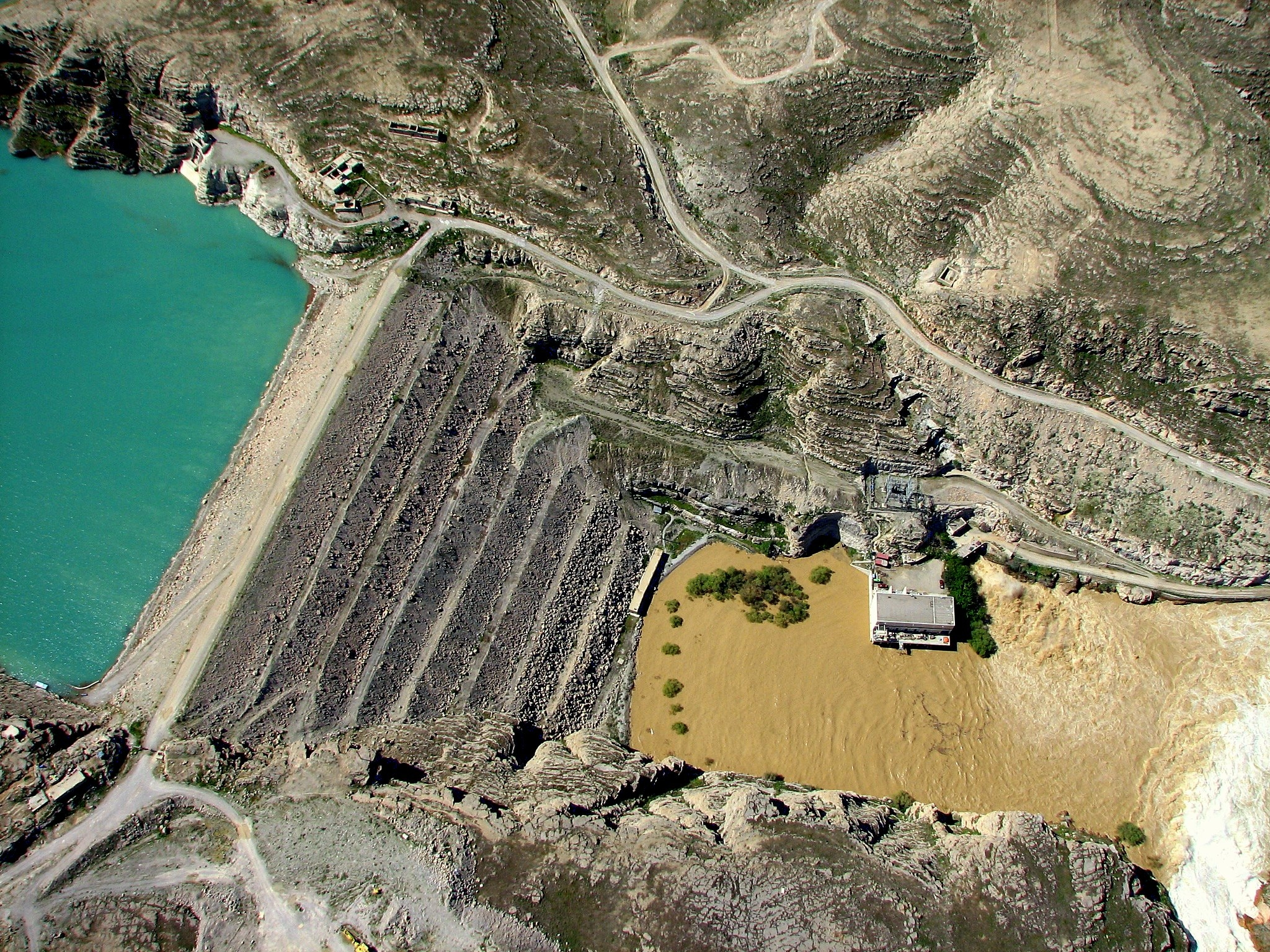
- Aerial view of the Kajaki Dam in 2007

- Location within Afghanistan
- Country: Afghanistan
- Location: Kajaki District, Helmand Province
- Coordinates: 32°19′19″N 65°7′8″E
- Purpose: Irrigation and electricity
- Status: Operational
- Construction began: 1951
- Opening date: 1953
- Owner: Ministry of Energy and Water

Dam and spillways
- Type of dam: Embankment
- Impounds: Helmand River
- Height: 100 m (330 ft)
- Length: 270 m (890 ft)
- Width (crest): 10 m (33 ft)

Reservoir
- Total capacity: 1,715×10^{6} m^{3} (1,390,373 acre⋅ft)
- Active capacity: 1,134×10^{6} m^{3} (919,349 acre⋅ft)

Power Station
- Operator: Helmand and Arghandab Valley Authority (HAVA)
- Commission date: 1975
- Turbines: 2 x 16.5 MW, 1 x 18.5 MW Francis-type
- Installed capacity: 51 MW

The Kajaki Dam is an embankment dam located on the Helmand River in the Kajaki District of Helmand Province, Afghanistan, about 161 km (100 mi) northwest of Kandahar. It has a hydroelectric power station, which is operated by the Helmand and Arghandab Valley Authority through the Ministry of Energy and Water.

Kajaki Dam has a dual function, to provide electricity and to irrigate some 263,045 ha (650,000 acres) or 1,800 km^{2} (690 sq mi) of an otherwise arid land. Water discharging from the dam traverses some 300 miles (500 km) of downstream irrigation canals feeding farmland. As of July 2022 it produces up to 151 megawatts (MW) of electricity.

The dam is 100 m (328 ft) high and 270 m (890 ft) long, with a gross storage capacity of 1,715,000,000 m^{3} (1,390,373 acre⋅ft) of fresh water. The dam controls the output of the main watershed which feeds the Sistan Basin.

== History ==
Final studies for the dam began in 1946 and a preliminary design was crafted in 1950. The dam was built between 1951 and 1953 by Morrison Knudsen as part of the Helmand Valley Authority project.

In 1975, the United States Agency for International Development commissioned the initial installation of two 16.5 MW generating units in a powerhouse constructed at the toe of the dam. This first stage powerhouse was actually constructed to house three equally sized units. Only units 1 and 3 were installed originally.

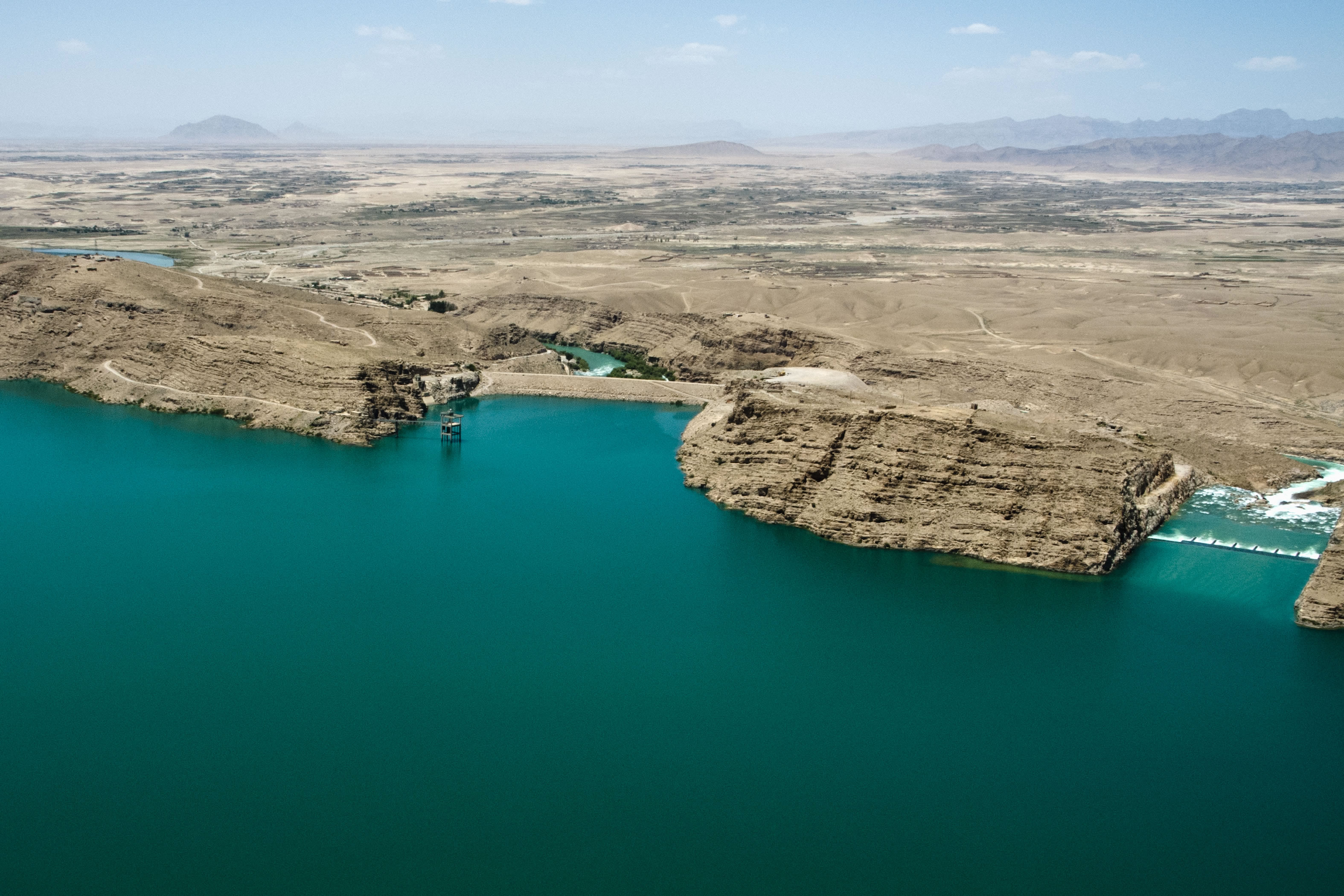
Aerial view of Kajaki Dam with its spillway to the right

Before the Soviets invaded Afghanistan in 1979, the contractors had already left the country. They had intended to raise the dam by 2 m (6 ft 7 in) in order to increase the available water for power production and irrigation. They were also excavating an emergency spillway which was never completed. Gates were also never installed in the service spillway so the dam passes all water in the reservoir above elevation of 1,033.5 m (3,391 ft). Completion of the spillway gates would increase the total storage capacity of the reservoir by 1,010,000,000 m^{3} (818,820 acre⋅ft) to 2,725,000,000 m^{3} (2,209,193 acre⋅ft).

The Kajaki dam powerhouse was a bombing target of the United States Air Force during their attack on Afghanistan in October 2001.

With funding from USAID, World Bank and other donors, Units 1 and 3 were fully rehabilitated and the power station had an installed capacity of 33 MW. Unit 1 was operational in September 2005 and Unit 3 in October 2009. The Unit 3 rehabilitation began in May 2006, with a scheduled return to service in early 2007. The new 18.5 MW Unit 2 turbine/generator had been contracted to China Machine Building International Corporation, which is headquartered in Beijing. The work was to be supervised by Montgomery Watson Harza and was planned to be completed by June 2007 but the work was not completed.

In February 2007, the Kajakai Dam was the subject of fighting between coalition forces and Taliban insurgents, as part of Operation Kryptonite. According to the governor of Helmand province, Assadullah Wafa, over 700 Taliban insurgents (including Pakistanis, Chechens and Uzbeks) coming from neighboring Pakistan fought against over 300 coalition troops. Most of the coalition troops were Dutch and British. The number of casualties mentioned varies.

Central to the long term energy security and sustained economic growth of southern Afghanistan is the rehabilitation and expansion of the Kajaki hydroelectric power plant. As a critical component of the Southern Electrical Power System, the capacity of the Kajaki plant would be expanded to 51 MW with a future potential for an additional 100 MW.

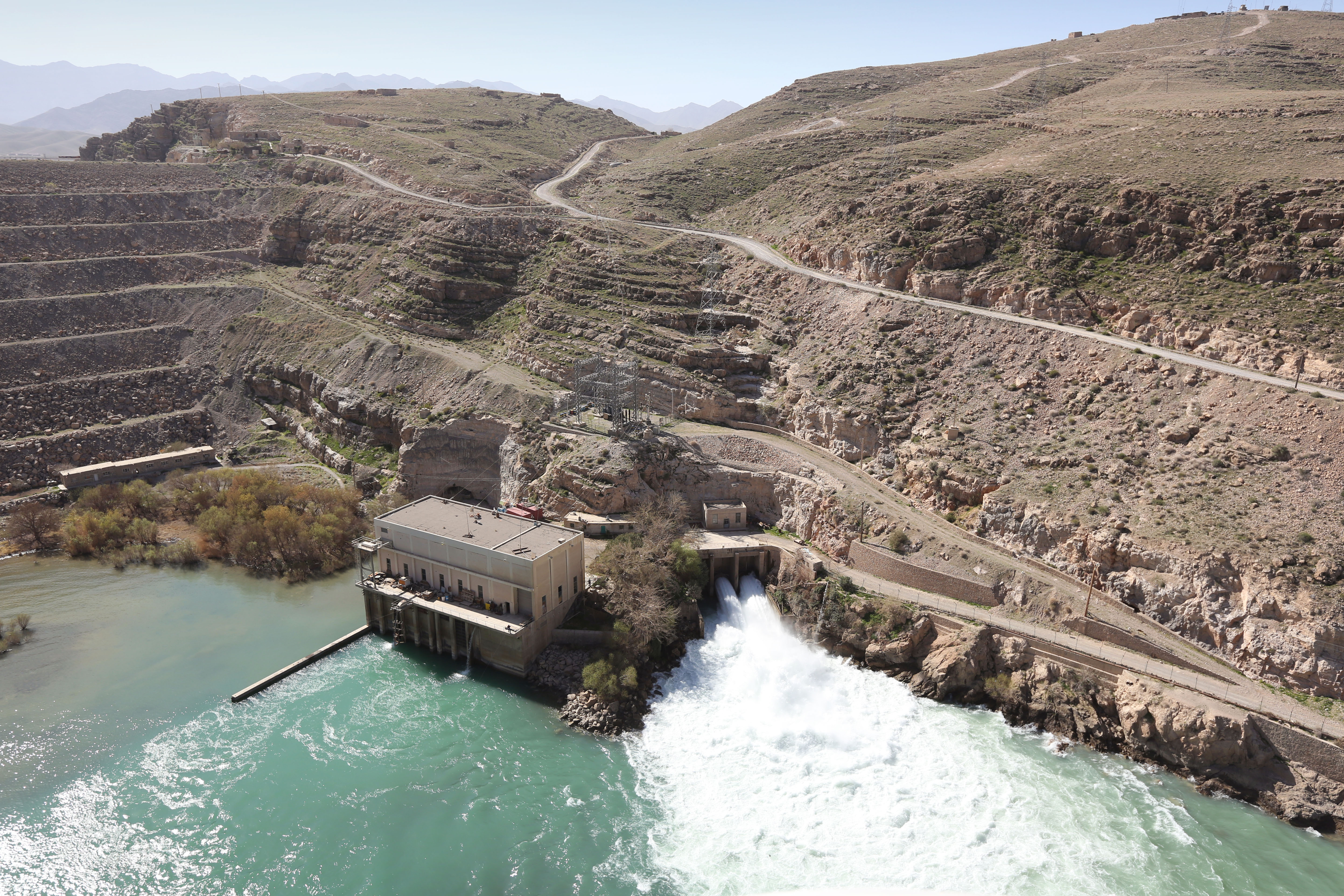
The Kajaki power station

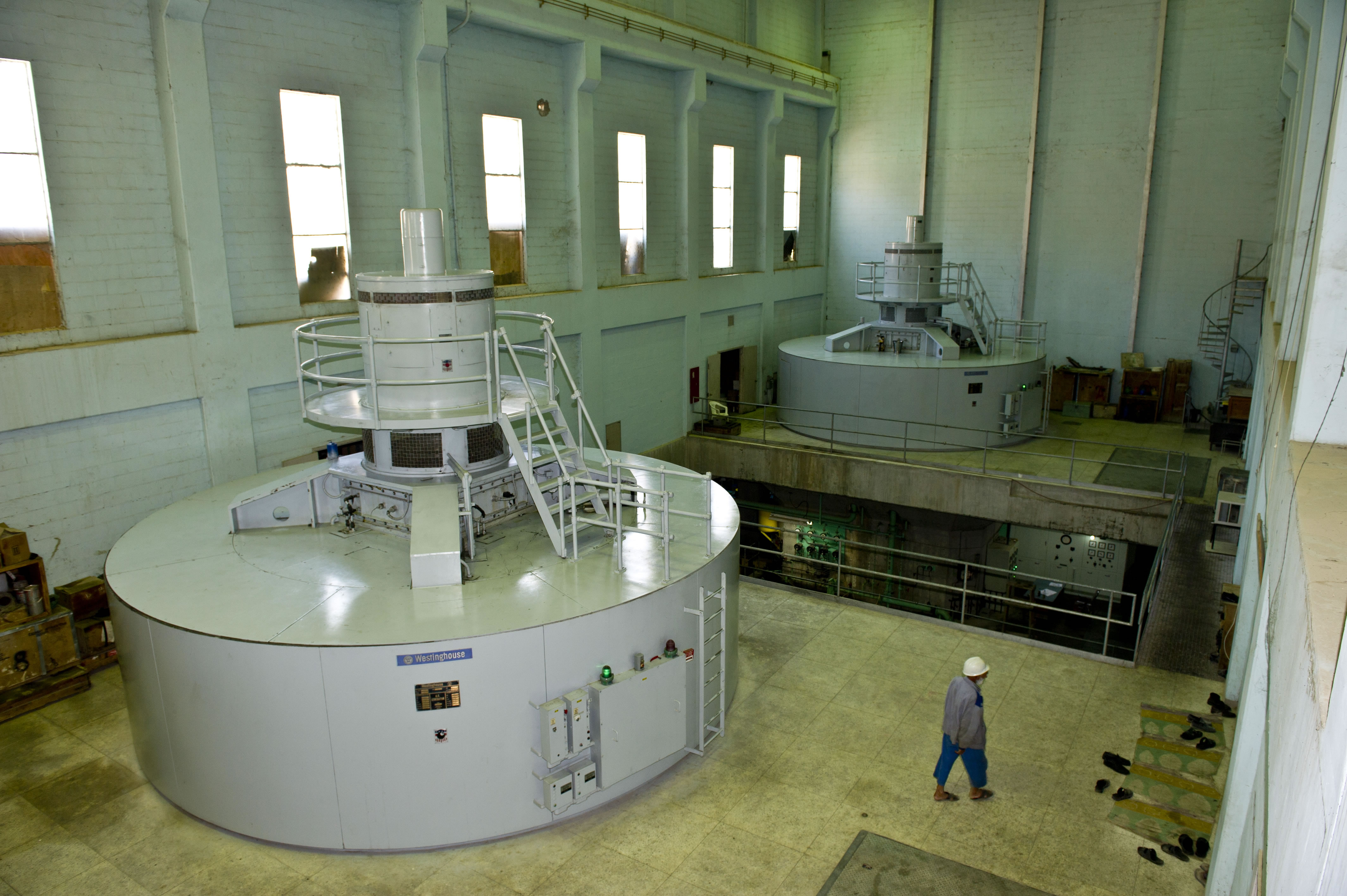
Inside the Kajaki power station

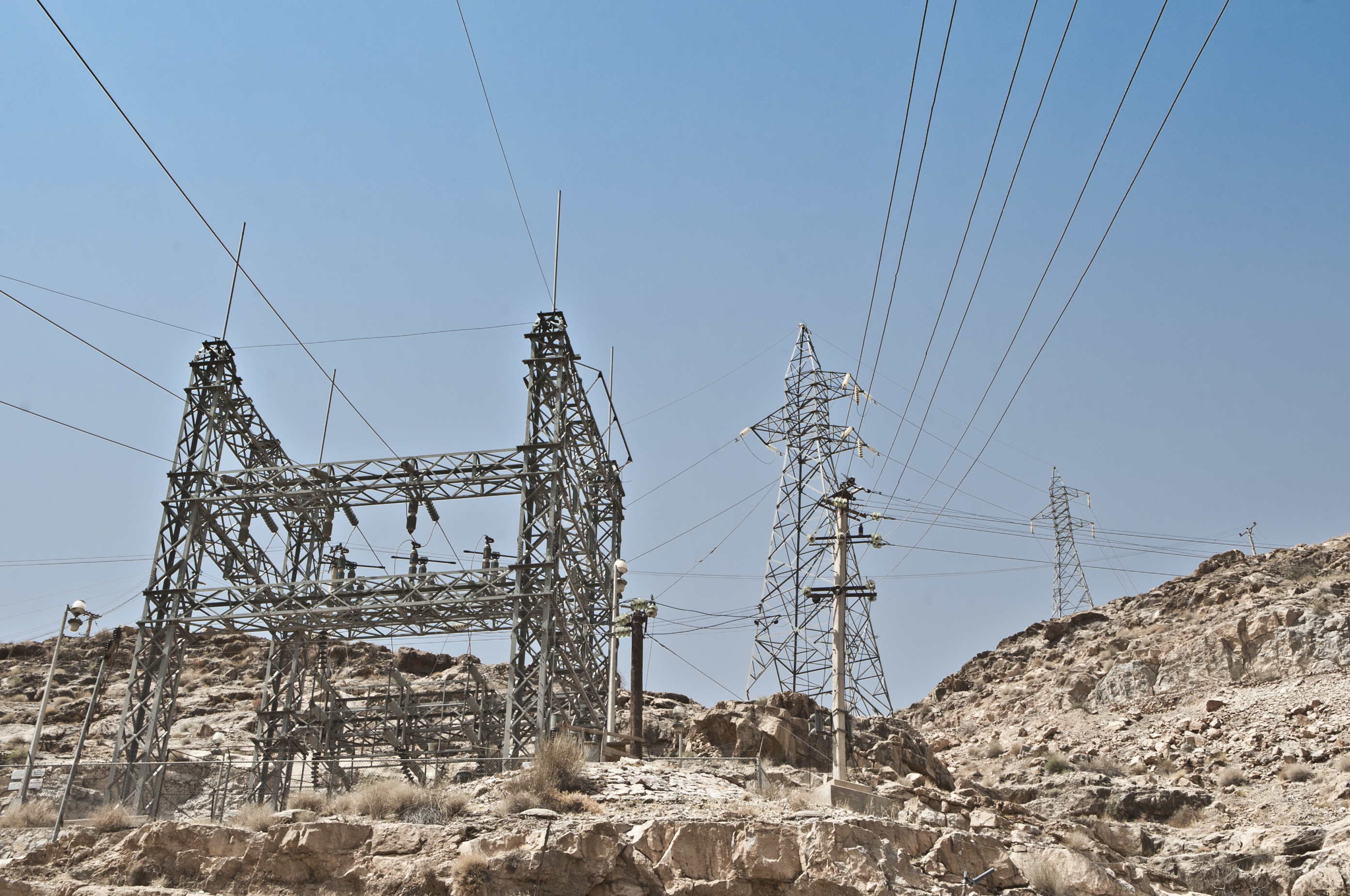
A series of power lines and substation connected to the Kajaki hydroelectric powerplant.

In late August 2008 a contingent of ISAF and Afghan troops successfully transported the third turbine (Unit 2) from Kandahar to the Kajaki Dam. The operation was British-led and codenamed Operation Oqab Tsuka, meaning "Eagle's Summit" in Pashto.

A BBC report on the unassembled and uninstalled turbine in June 2011 estimated project completion in late 2013. Despite the turbine being delivered onsite in 2008, over 7 years later it had still not been installed, as its installation required 700 tonnes of cement which could not be delivered to the dam due to attacks by the Taliban. The purpose of these projects were to improve distribution of electrical power to the people of Helmand and Kandahar provinces.

In February 2015, USAID anticipated completion in 2016. When the turbine came online, and a new grid of power lines were established to distribute the power, the dam was able to provide 51 megawatts of power. The project reduced reliance on more expensive and dirtier diesel generation, and nearly doubled the amount of renewable energy distributed to Kandahar. The Afghan electric authority assumed full responsibility for operations and maintenance in March 2017.

=== U.S. Army Corps of Engineers ===
The United States Army Corps of Engineers (USACE) had several concurrent project plans associated with the Kajaki Dam with a total program amount of approximately $205 million. Together, the projects would improve water flow for irrigation and electric power generation. The first phase would repair the dam's intake structure. The gates did not close, so no maintenance could be performed on the gates or the irrigation outlet tunnels.

The project included the rehabilitation of existing intake structure components: intake bulkhead gate, steel sliding gate, crane, crane hoist assembly, lifting assembly, embedded parts, and hydrology gauge.

The second phase would rehabilitate the three 84 in (2,100 mm) roto valves inside the irrigation tunnel and three 84 in (2,100 mm) jet valves at the outlet end of the irrigation tunnel. A roto valve is designed to open and close relatively easily, despite high fluid pressure. Jet valves are installed as part of the outlet structure, and decrease the pressure of the water exiting the bottom of the dam, which prevents erosion and scouring. Another part of the project was to evaluate the current condition of inoperable piezometers at the dam and seek bids to repair or replace them.

=== Southern Electrical Power System ===
This two-phased project would improve access to electric power for residents of Helmand and Kandahar provinces. The SEPS—Helmand phase included rebuilding the Kajaki Substation; replacing the 20kV line from the Kajaki Substation to Tangi; a new switchyard at Tangi; a new substation at Musa Qal'eh; a new 110kV line from Kajaki Substation to Musa Qal'eh Substation; a new 20kV line from Kajaki Substation to Kajaki Village, and the rebuilding of a 110kV line from Kajaki Substation to Sangin.

The project also included rebuilding the Sangin North Substation, a new substation at Sangin South, rebuilding a 110kV line from Sangin to Durai Junction, and rebuilding a 110kV line from Durai Junction to Lashkar Gah. USACE awarded the project to Perini Management Services, Inc. of Framingham, Mass., with a 550-day period of performance.

The SEPS-Kandahar project included repairing an existing 110kV line from Durai Junction to Kandahar City, constructing new substations at Maiwand and Pushmool, and upgrading substations at Breshna Kot.

As of July 2022, Kajaki Dam generates up to 151 MW of electricity.

== Water supply accord ==
Under an accord signed between Afghanistan and Iran in 1973, Afghanistan agreed to release water at a rate of at least 820 cu ft/s (23 m^{3}/s). In 1998, Afghanistan briefly stopped the flow of water to Iran, using a canal to divert water of Helmand River southward into the Godzareh Depression. As a result, the Hamun Lake dried up, as did regional pastures, leading to a decline of flora, fauna, cattle and birds in the northern part of the Sistan and Baluchestan Province of Iran. In May 2023 Iran's then-President Ebrahim Raisi requested from the Kajaki reservoir emergency water for the Sistan and Baluchestan province. In January 2025, Hasan Akhund, the acting Prime Minister of Afghanistan, directly told Abbas Araghchi, Iran's Minister of Foreign Affairs, that Afghanistan will always provide water to Iran even if there were no treaties between the two countries.

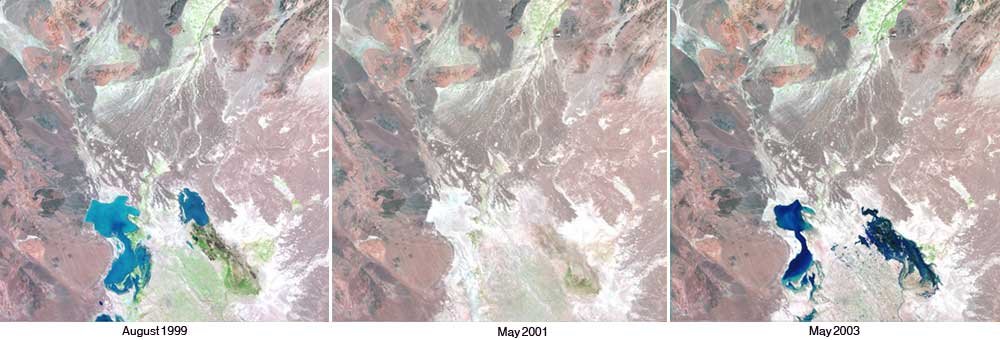
Time Series of Water in Lake Hamoun, Iran/Afghanistan

== Climate ==
Climate data for Kajaki
Month	Jan	Feb	Mar	Apr	May	Jun	Jul	Aug	Sep	Oct	Nov	Dec	Year
Mean daily maximum °C (°F)	12.0 (53.6)	14.2 (57.6)	21.0 (69.8)	27.5 (81.5)	33.6 (92.5)	39.2 (102.6)	40.3 (104.5)	38.8 (101.8)	34.1 (93.4)	28.1 (82.6)	20.3 (68.5)	14.6 (58.3)	27.0 (80.6)
Daily mean °C (°F)	5.5 (41.9)	7.7 (45.9)	13.7 (56.7)	19.3 (66.7)	24.5 (76.1)	29.3 (84.7)	30.9 (87.6)	29.0 (84.2)	23.5 (74.3)	17.9 (64.2)	11.2 (52.2)	7.2 (45.0)	18.3 (65.0)
Mean daily minimum °C (°F)	−0.9 (30.4)	1.2 (34.2)	6.4 (43.5)	11.2 (52.2)	15.4 (59.7)	19.4 (66.9)	21.6 (70.9)	19.2 (66.6)	13.0 (55.4)	7.7 (45.9)	2.2 (36.0)	−0.5 (31.1)	9.7 (49.4)
Source: Climate-Data.org

== In film ==
- The American effort to build the dam is mentioned in Adam Curtis's 2015 documentary Bitter Lake. According to the film, the dam caused a salinization of the fields allowing the cultivation of opium.
- Kajaki is a 2014 British war docu-drama film based on the Kajaki Dam incident, involving a small unit of British soldiers positioned near the Kajaki dam.

== See also ==
- Energy in Afghanistan
- List of dams and reservoirs in Afghanistan
- List of rivers of Afghanistan
