= William A. Shunk =

US Army colonel

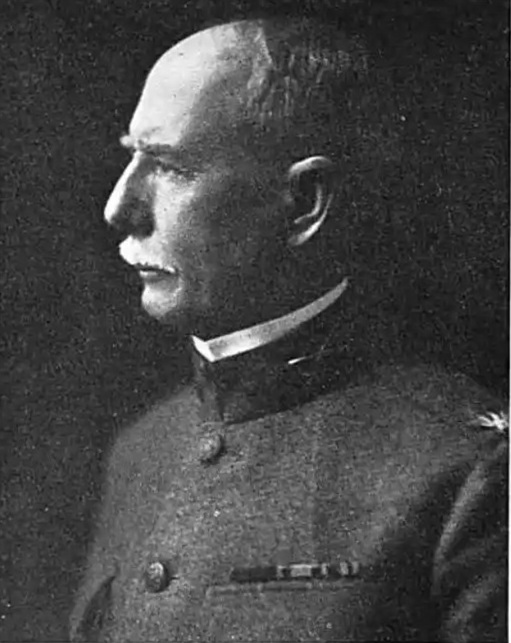
- Shunk c. 1920
- Born: 23 December 1857; Westville, Indiana, US
- Died: 9 March 1936 (aged 78); Washington, D.C., US
- Burial place: Arlington National Cemetery
- Alma mater: United States Military Academy; United States Army Command and General Staff College; United States Army War College
- Spouse: Caroline "Carrie" Saxe Merrill (m. 1885–1930)
- Children: 1
- Military career
- Service: United States Army
- Service years: 1879–1921
- Rank: Colonel
- Unit: US Army Cavalry Branch
- Commands: Transportation Building, World's Columbian Exposition; U.S. Forces, San Isidro; U.S. Forces, Baler; U.S. Forces, Piddig; 1st Cavalry Regiment; Fort Walla Walla; Boise Barracks; Department of the Colorado; Fort Huachuca; 7th Cavalry Regiment; 15th Cavalry Regiment; Fort Leavenworth; United States Army Command and General Staff College; Southern California Border District
- Wars: American Indian Wars; Spanish–American War; Philippine–American War; Military Government of Cuba; Mexican Border War; World War I
- Awards: Indian Campaign Medal; Spanish Campaign Medal; Army of Cuban Occupation Medal; Philippine Campaign Medal; Mexican Service Medal; World War I Victory Medal; Mexican Border Service Medal, 1916-1917 (Alabama)

William A. Shunk (23 December 1857 – 9 March 1936) was a career officer in the United States Army. A veteran of the American Indian Wars, Spanish–American War, Philippine–American War, Military Government of Cuba, Mexican Border War, and World War I, he attained the rank of colonel. Shunk spent his career in the Cavalry, and his commands included the 1st Cavalry Regiment, 7th Cavalry Regiment, 15th Cavalry Regiment, and commandant of the United States Army Command and General Staff College.

A native of Westville, Indiana, and an 1879 graduate of the United States Military Academy at West Point, Shunk was commissioned in the Cavalry. His initial postings included American Indian Wars duty at forts in Texas and New Mexico. In 1887, he graduated from the Infantry and Cavalry School of Application (now the United States Army Command and General Staff College). After Cavalry postings in Texas and North Dakota, he joined the faculty of the Infantry and Cavalry School, where he served from 1889 to 1893. In 1893, he served with the army contingent that staffed the World's Columbian Exposition in Chicago. During the Spanish–American War, he served in staff roles at Camp Chickamauga, Georgia. From 1899 to 1901, he served with the 34th U.S. Volunteer Infantry during the Philippine–American War. In 1901 and 1902, he served with the Military Government of Cuba, and he was assigned as professor of military science and tactics at St. John's Military Academy in Delafield, Wisconsin, from 1904 to 1908.

In 1909 and 1910, Shunk was assigned to duty in the Philippines as a member of the 1st Cavalry Regiment, and he served as the regimental commander on more than one occasion. After his return to the United States, he commanded the 1st Cavalry at the Presidio of San Francisco from February to July 1910, the post at Fort Walla Walla, Washington, from July until August 1910, and the post at Boise Barracks, Idaho, from August 1910 to March 1911. In March and April 1911, Shunk commanded the Department of the Colorado and the post at Fort Huachuca, Arizona during the Mexican Border War. He graduated from the United States Army War College in June 1912, after which he served as chief of National Guard affairs for the Central Department in Chicago.

From June 1914 to October 1915, Shunk commanded the 7th Cavalry Regiment in the Philippines. In 1915 and 1916, he was commander of the 15th Cavalry Regiment during its service in the Philippines. During World War I, he was posted to Camp Vandiver Park, Alabama from 1916 to 1917 as senior mustering in officer for units of the National Guard being called up for service on the Mexican border and in France. From 1917 to 1919, Shunk commanded the post at Fort Leavenworth, Kansas, and served as commandant of the Infantry and Cavalry School, by then called the Army Service Schools. He performed recruiting duty in Syracuse, New York, from June to August 1919 and Los Angeles from August 1919 to March 1921. From March 1921 until reaching the mandatory retirement age of 64 in December 1921, Shunk was commander of the Southern California Border District.

In retirement, Shunk lived in Washington, D.C. He died in Washington on 9 March 1936. Shunk was buried at Arlington National Cemetery.

== Early life and start of career ==
William Alexander Shunk was born in Westville, Indiana, on 23 December 1857, a son of Union Army veteran Francis R. Shunk and Canarissa (Logan) Shunk. He was raised and educated in Westville, and in September 1874 he finished first on the competitive examination for an appointment to the United States Military Academy at West Point that was offered by US Representative Jasper Packard. Shunk attended from July 1875 to June 1879 and graduated ranked 11th of 67. Among his classmates who became general officers were: Frederic Vaughan Abbot; Theodore A. Bingham; Frederick Steinman Foltz; Henry Alexander Greene; John Alexander Johnston; William Dorrance Beach; Thomas Cruse; Lloyd Milton Brett; Albert Leopold Mills; Hunter Liggett; James Anderson Irons; and John Skinner Mallory. Among his prominent classmates who did not attain general's rank were: Thomas Lincoln Casey Jr.; James R. Lockett; and Thomas J. Lewis.

At graduation, Shunk received his commission as a second lieutenant of Cavalry. His initial assignments included frontier duty in Texas. He was assigned to the 8th Cavalry Regiment in San Felipe from September 1879 to April 1880. Shunk was posted to Fort Clark and American Indian Wars scouting expeditions from April 1880 to November 1882. He was then transferred to Fort Sam Houston, where he served from November 1882 to December 1883, then Fort Clark, where he was assigned from December 1883 to November 1884. From November 1884 to August 1885, Shunk was in New Mexico Territory taking part in the Geronimo Campaign, and he was promoted to first lieutenant in July 1885.

== Continued career ==
Shunk attended the Infantry and Cavalry School of Application (now the United States Army Command and General Staff College at Fort Leavenworth, Kansas, from July 1885 to July 1887. He was posted to Fort Clark in August and September, after which he was assigned to duty at Fort Davis, Texas, where he served until September 1888. His next duty station was Fort Meade, South Dakota, where he served until August 1889. He was then assigned to the Infantry and Cavalry School faculty, where he served from August 1889 to June 1893 while also serving as assistant editor of the Cavalry Journal. Shunk was promoted to captain in October 1892. He served from June to December 1893 with the army contingent that staffed the World's Columbian Exposition in Chicago, where he was assigned to superintend the Transportation Building, which housed exhibits including locomotives and construction equipment. After his duty at the World's Fair, Shunk returned to Fort Meade. From May 1894 to September 1896, he was assigned to the post at Fort Yates, North Dakota. Shunk was then posted to Fort Keogh, Montana, where he remained until June 1897.

Shunk served on temporary detached duty as secretary of the Army Officers' Insurance Association in Washington, D.C., from July 1897 to June 1898. The Spanish–American War commenced in April 1898, and in May he was promoted to temporary major of United States Volunteers. He served as chief engineer of 2nd Division, First Army Corps from June 1898 to February 1899. In August 1898, he was part of an advance party that arrived at Camp Chickamauga, Georgia to complete arrangements for the division's arrival. In October 1898, a tongue in cheek article that appeared in the Knoxville Sentinel credited Shunk with having told 6,897 funny stories since arriving at Chickamauga and claimed he was aiming for 10,000. Later that month, he was assigned duty as mustering officer at Chickamauga. In November, he was transferred from 1st Division, First Corps to 2nd Division, First Corps and he was discharged from the volunteers in March 1899. Shunk served on temporary recruiting duty from April to July, 1899, and assisted in raising the 34th U.S. Volunteer Infantry for Philippine–American War service in the Philippines. In July, he was again promoted to major of volunteers. Shunk sailed from San Francisco with the 34th U.S. Volunteers in September 1899 and they arrived in Manila in October.

In the Philippines, Shunk took part in Henry Ware Lawton's northern expedition in October and November 1899. From December 1899 to February 1900, he commanded U.S. forces at San Isidro and its adjacent sub‑posts. He took part in Frederick Funston's expedition to Baler in February 1900, afterwards commanding U.S. forces in Baler and the adjacent region. From December 1900 to February 1901, he commanded U.S. Forces in Piddig and the adjacent area. The 34th U.S. Volunteer Infantry sailed for the United States in early March 1901 and arrived in San Francisco on 29 March. Shunk was discharged from the volunteers on 17 April.

From April to July 1901, Shunk was assistant to the army's chief mustering officer. After an extended leave of absence, he served during the Military Government of Cuba at Camp R. S. Mackenzie near Puerto Principe from October 1901 to February 1902. He served at Fort Riley, Kansas, from February to July, 1902 and he was promoted to major in June. Shunk was posted to Jefferson Barracks, Missouri, until September 1903, and at Fort Riley from September 1903 to September 1904. From September 1904 to September 1908, he was assigned as professor of military science and tactics at St. John's Military Academy in Delafield, Wisconsin. While serving at St. John's, Shunk was chief umpire for war games at the National Guard camps of instruction held at Fort Benjamin Harrison, Indiana, in August 1906 and September 1908.

== Later career ==
Shunk performed staff duty at the headquarters of the Department of the Lakes in Chicago in October 1908. He received promotion to lieutenant colonel in November 1908. Shunk was posted to staff duty with the Department of California headquarters in San Francisco from December 1908 to February 1909. He joined the 1st Cavalry Regiment at Fort Stotsenburg, Philippines, in March 1909 and commanded the regiment and the post from April to June 1909, and again from December 1909 to January 1910. He commanded the 1st Cavalry at the Presidio of San Francisco from February to July 1910, then commanded the post at Fort Walla Walla, Washington, from July until August 1910, when the army abandoned the site. He commanded the post at Boise Barracks, Idaho from August 1910 to March 1911.

In March and April 1911, Shunk commanded the Department of the Colorado and the post at Fort Huachuca, Arizona, during the Mexican Border War. He was at Camp Harry J. Jones near Douglas, Arizona, during the April 1911 First Battle of Agua Prieta, where he prevented an escalation of tension by ensuring that US troops did not cross into Mexico. From August 1911 to July 1912, Shunk served with the 1st Cavalry while it was posted to border patrol duty in Calexico, California. From August 1911 to July 1912, he attended the course at the United States Army War College. After graduating, he was promoted to colonel in August and served at the Central Department headquarters in Chicago as the chief of National Guard affairs from August 1912 to May 1914. He served as assistant to the department's inspector general from May to December 1912 and commanded the department in April and May 1914. From June 1914 to October 1915, Shunk commanded the 7th Cavalry Regiment in the Philippines, first at Fort William McKinley, then at Fort Stotsenburg.

Shunk commanded the 15th Cavalry Regiment at Fort William McKinley from September 1915 to September 1916. Upon return to the United States, commanded the 15th Cavalry in San Francisco until October 1916. In December 1916, he was assigned as an instructor of Cavalry at Fort Sam Houston, Texas, where he remained until March 1917. American entry into World War I happened in April 1917, and Shunk was posted to Camp Vandiver Park, Alabama as senior mustering in officer for units of the National Guard being called to federal service for service on the Mexican border and in France. From July 1917 to June 1919, Shunk commanded the post at Fort Leavenworth, Kansas, and succeeded Charles Miller as commandant of the Army Service Schools (now the United States Army Command and General Staff College). He was assigned to recruiting duty in Syracuse, New York, from June to August 1919, and performed recruiting officer duty in Los Angeles from August 1919 to March 1921. From March 1921 until his December 1921 retirement, Shunk commanded the Southern California Border District.

In retirement, Shunk was a resident of Washington, D.C. He was a member of the Military Order of Foreign Wars, Order of the Indian Wars of the United States, and the Army and Navy Club of Washington, D.C. He died in Washington on 9 March 1936. Shunk was buried at Arlington National Cemetery.

== Awards ==
Shunk's awards included:

- Indian Campaign Medal
- Spanish Campaign Medal
- Army of Cuban Occupation Medal
- Philippine Campaign Medal
- Mexican Service Medal
- World War I Victory Medal
- Mexican Border Service Medal, 1916-1917 (Alabama)

=== Additional accolades ===
During Frederick Funston's Philippine–American War expedition to prevent war supplies from reaching China during the Boxer Rebellion of 1899 to 1901, he placed Shunk in charge of operations in the Philippine city of Baler, Aurora. In his memoirs, Funston recounted Shunk's success at curbing Baler's support to the Chinese rebels by jokingly referring to him as "King Shunk the First."

In 1911, Shunk was commended by the United States Secretary of War for his performance of duty while at Camp Harry J. Jones, Arizona during the Mexican Border War. In his letter, Jacob M. Dickinson praised Shunk's tact and good judgment for not crossing the U.S.–Mexico border during fighting by Mexican government troops and rebels led by Francisco Madero during the First Battle of Agua Prieta. (US troops did respond after Mexican government troops attacked soldiers on the U.S. side of the border.)

== Dates of rank ==
Shunk's dates of rank were:

- Second Lieutenant, 13 June 1879
- First Lieutenant, 23 June 1885
- Captain, 5 October 1892
- Major (United States Volunteers), 19 May 1898
- Captain, 13 March 1899
- Major (United States Volunteers), 5 July 1899
- Captain, 17 April 1901
- Major, 28 June 1902
- Lieutenant Colonel, 20 November 1908.
- Colonel, 2 August 1915
- Colonel (Retired), 23 December 1921
