= Hunter Liggett =

United States Army general (1857–1935)

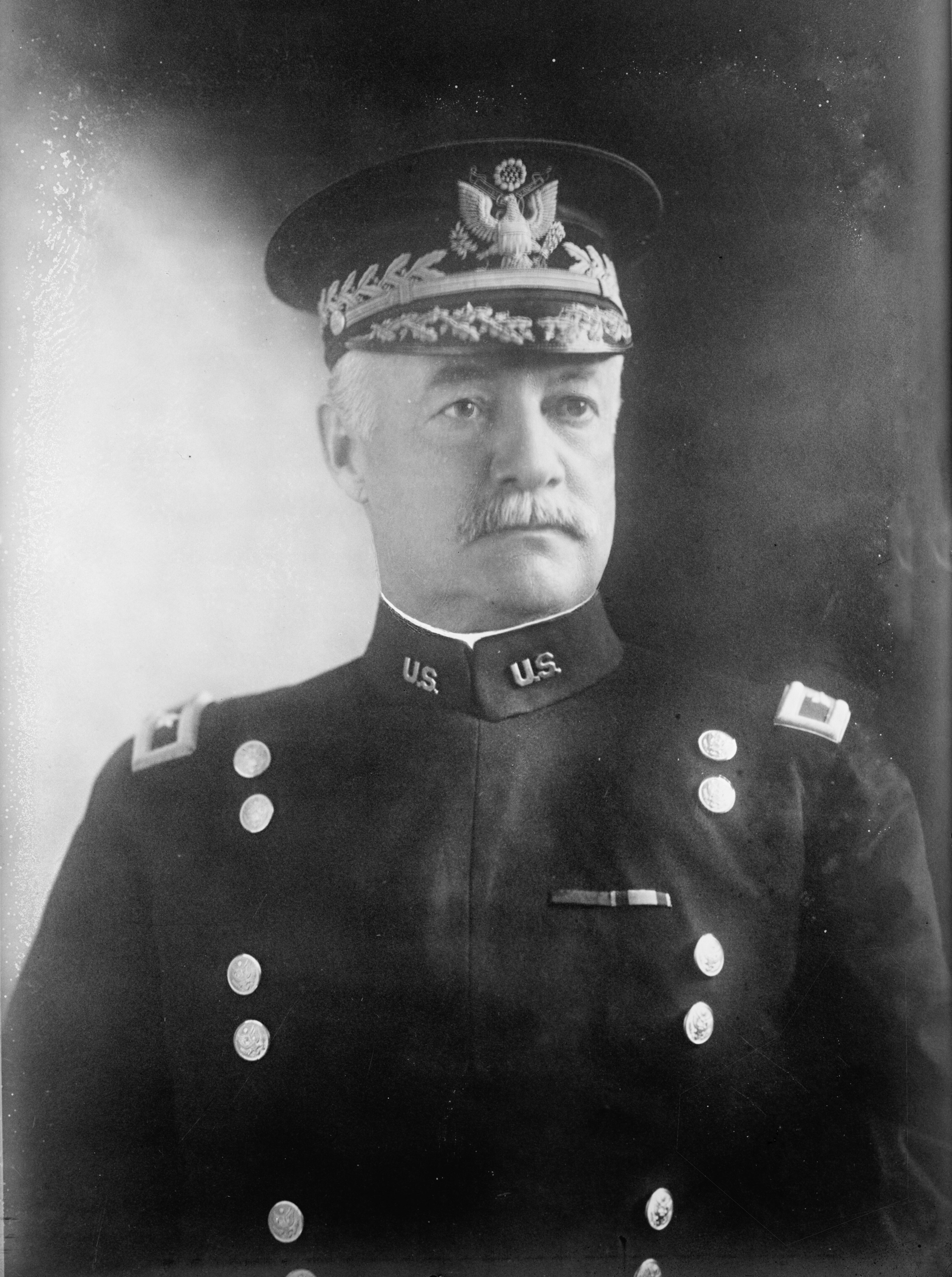
- Hunter Liggett as a brigadier general.
- Born: March 21, 1857; Reading, Pennsylvania, US
- Died: December 30, 1935 (aged 78); San Francisco, California, US
- Burial place: San Francisco National Cemetery
- Spouse: Harriet R. Lane (m. 1881–1935)
- Military career
- Branch: United States Army
- Service years: 1879–1921
- Rank: Lieutenant General
- Service number: 0-3
- Unit: US Army Infantry Branch
- Commands: Company D, 5th Infantry Regiment; Sub-district of Davao; U.S. Troops, Abra Province; 2nd Battalion, 13th Infantry Regiment; United States Army War College; Department of the Lakes; 4th Brigade, 2nd Division; Provisional Infantry Brigade, Fort William McKinley; Department of the Philippines; Western Department; 41st Division; I Corps; First Army; Third Army; Ninth Corps Area
- Conflicts: American Indian Wars; Spanish–American War; Philippine–American War; Mexican Border War; World War I
- Awards: Army Distinguished Service Medal; Legion of Honour (France); Croix de guerre (France)
- Other work: Author

Hunter Liggett (March 21, 1857 − December 30, 1935) was a senior United States Army officer. His 42 years of military service spanned the period from the American Indian Wars to World War I. An 1879 graduate of the United States Military Academy (West Point), Liggett served in the Infantry, and was initially posted to Montana and North Dakota during campaigns against the Sioux. During the Spanish–American War, he served first in the United States and later commanded a company of the 5th Infantry Regiment in Santiago de Cuba. He later joined the United States Volunteers, and he served as commander of a province in the Philippines during the Philippine–American War.

After his service in the Philippines, Liggett's assignments included command of a battalion in the 13th Infantry Regiment, completion of the United States Army War College course as a student, director and president of the war college, and commander of a brigade in the 2nd Division. Immediately prior to World War I, Liggett commanded a brigade in the Philippines and the Department of the Philippines. During World War I, he was one of two officers promoted to lieutenant general as commander of a field army; Liggett commanded first the First U.S. Army and later the Third U.S. Army.

After the war, Liggett commanded the army's Western Department and Ninth Corps Area, and he retired in 1921. In retirement, Liggett authored a memoir of his wartime service. He died in San Francisco on December 30, 1935 and was buried at San Francisco National Cemetery.

== Early life ==
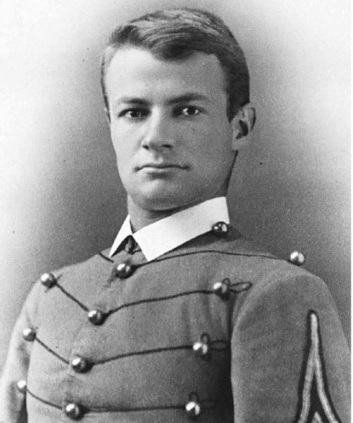
Hunter Liggett, West Point cadet, 1879

Hunter Liggett was born in Reading, Pennsylvania on March 21, 1857, the son of James and Margaret (Hunter) Liggett. He was raised and educated in Birdsboro, Pennsylvania, and later attended Boys' Grammar School in the Manayunk neighborhood of Philadelphia. Having decided on a military career, Liggett received tutoring from Birdsboro's supervising school principal, Henry C. Hunter, in preparation for admission to the United States Military Academy at West Point. Six applicants including Liggett took the competitive examination offered by Congressman Hiester Clymer; Liggett finished first and received the appointment.

Liggett attended West Point beginning in 1875, graduated in 1879 ranked 41st of 67, and received his commission as a second lieutenant of Infantry. Among his classmates who later attained general officer rank were William Dorrance Beach, John Skinner Mallory, James Anderson Irons, Lloyd Milton Brett, Albert Leopold Mills, John Alexander Johnston, Henry Alexander Greene, Frederick Steinman Foltz and Samuel W. Miller.

== Military service ==
=== Early military career ===
Liggett was initially assigned to the 5th Infantry Regiment at Fort Keogh, Montana, where he remained until December 1879. He served temporarily at Fort Abraham Lincoln, North Dakota until February 1880; during early 1880 he took part in American Indian Wars expeditions and scouting parties against bands of Sioux that had conducted raids on farms and towns near their reservations. He returned to Fort Keogh in February 1880, and remained there until August 1886. Liggett received promotion to first lieutenant in June 1884. He was posted to Fort Totten, North Dakota until May 1888, after which he was assigned to Fort McIntosh, Texas, where he served until July 1890. Liggett served at Fort Davis, Texas until July 1891, which was followed by assignment to Fort Sam Houston, Texas where he remained until May, 1892. He was appointed regimental adjutant in May 1892 and stationed at St. Francis Barracks, Florida, where he served until October 1894. Liggett was next assigned to Fort McPherson, Georgia where he served until April 1898. He was relieved of his adjutant's duties in May 1896 and promoted to captain in June 1897.

At the start of the Spanish–American War in April 1898, Liggett was assigned to the Tampa, Florida port of embarkation, where he served until May. From May to July, he was in command of the post at Fort St. Philip, Louisiana, where he served until July. In June 1898, Liggett was promoted to temporary major of United States Volunteers. He served as adjutant of 3rd Division, Fourth Army Corps from July to October 1898, including duty at Tampa in July, Fernandina Beach, Florida from July to August, and Huntsville, Alabama in September and October. Liggett served as adjutant of 3rd Division, Second Army Corps, in Athens, Georgia from October 1898 to January 1899, and in Greenville, South Carolina until April 1899. He was discharged from the volunteers in April 1899.

=== Continued military career ===
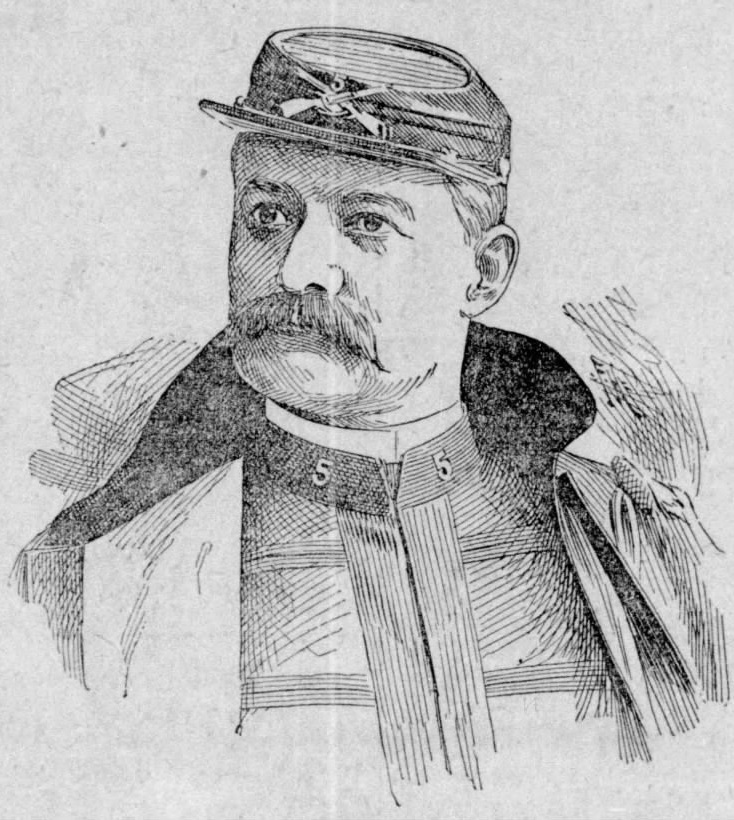
Liggett as a first lieutenant in 1897

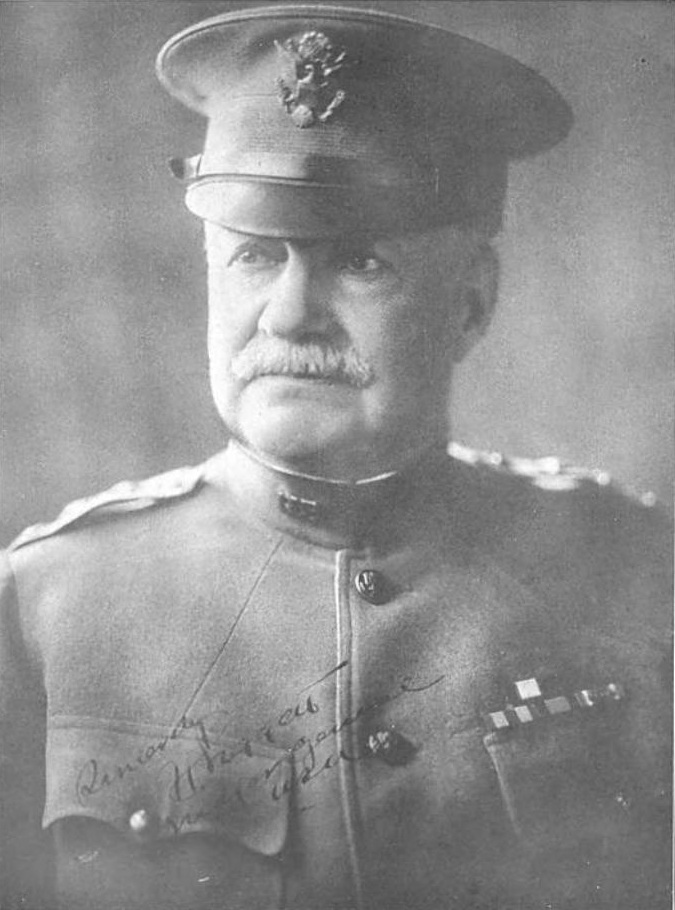
Liggett as a lieutenant general in 1919

From May to August 1899, Liggett commanded Company D, 5th Infantry during post-war occupation duty in Santiago de Cuba. In July, he was again promoted to temporary major of U.S. Volunteers and in August he joined 2nd Battalion, 31st U.S. Volunteer Infantry at Fort Thomas, Kentucky. In an event that was widely reported after Liggett attained prominence during World War I, 31st Infantry troops including Liggett were aboard the transport ship Immanuense when she began to founder in a storm while in the Philippines in late 1899. After she failed to arrive in port, another transport carrying 31st Infantry soldiers, City of Peking, put back out to sea to search. Soldiers aboard City of Peking found Immanuense half full of water, with Liggett, who had gone sleepless for days, leading soldiers in the hold who were bailing and pumping non-stop to keep the ship afloat. When the event was covered in 1918 newspaper stories, one 5th Infantry veteran who had known Liggett since the start of his career scouting the Sioux on horseback said Liggett could be counted on to perform well in France, given that he had shown "He can lick anything from an army mule to the Pacific Ocean." Liggett performed Philippine–American War duty on the island of Mindanao as commander of the sub-district of Davao from December 1899 to October 1901. He was discharged from the volunteers in June 1901. He rejoined the 5th Infantry in October 1901 and commanded troops in Abra Province until December. He was then assigned as adjutant of the 1st Separate Brigade at Dagupan, where he served until July 1902. Liggett was promoted to major in the regular army's 21st Infantry Regiment in May 1902.

After returning to the United States, Liggett served with the 5th Infantry at Fort Snelling, Minnesota from September 1902 to September 1903. From September 1903 to September 1907, he was assigned as adjutant of the Department of the Lakes in Chicago. In October 1907, Liggett joined the 13th U.S. Infantry Regiment at Fort Leavenworth, Kansas, and was assigned to command the organization's 2nd Battalion. Liggett remained in command until July 1910 and was promoted to lieutenant colonel of the 15th Infantry. During his battalion command, Liggett audited courses at the United States Army Command and General Staff College, with instructor George C. Marshall sharing the course's lessons, exercises, and schoolhouse solutions with Liggett, and Liggett accepting Marshall's tutoring even though Marshall was junior to him.

Liggett attended the United States Army War College from July 1909 to July 1910. After graduating, he was assigned as the school's director. In March 1912, he was promoted to colonel and appointed as president of the Army War College. In February 1913, Liggett was promoted to brigadier general and he remained in the president's post until April 1914. He commanded the Department of the Lakes in April and May 1914, then was posted to Texas City, Texas during the Mexican Border War as commander of 4th Brigade, 2nd Division, where he served until November 1914. He then returned to the Philippines, where he commanded a provisional infantry brigade at Fort William McKinley until April 1916. While in the Philippines during this tour of duty, Liggett led a staff ride that identified possible invasion sites in Luzon, particularly Lingayen Gulf; these locations were the sites of Japanese attacks when Japan entered World War II in 1941 and in 1945 when the United States counterattacked. He commanded the Department of the Philippines from April 1916 to April 1917, when he returned to the United States. Liggett was promoted to major general in March 1917.

=== Later military career ===
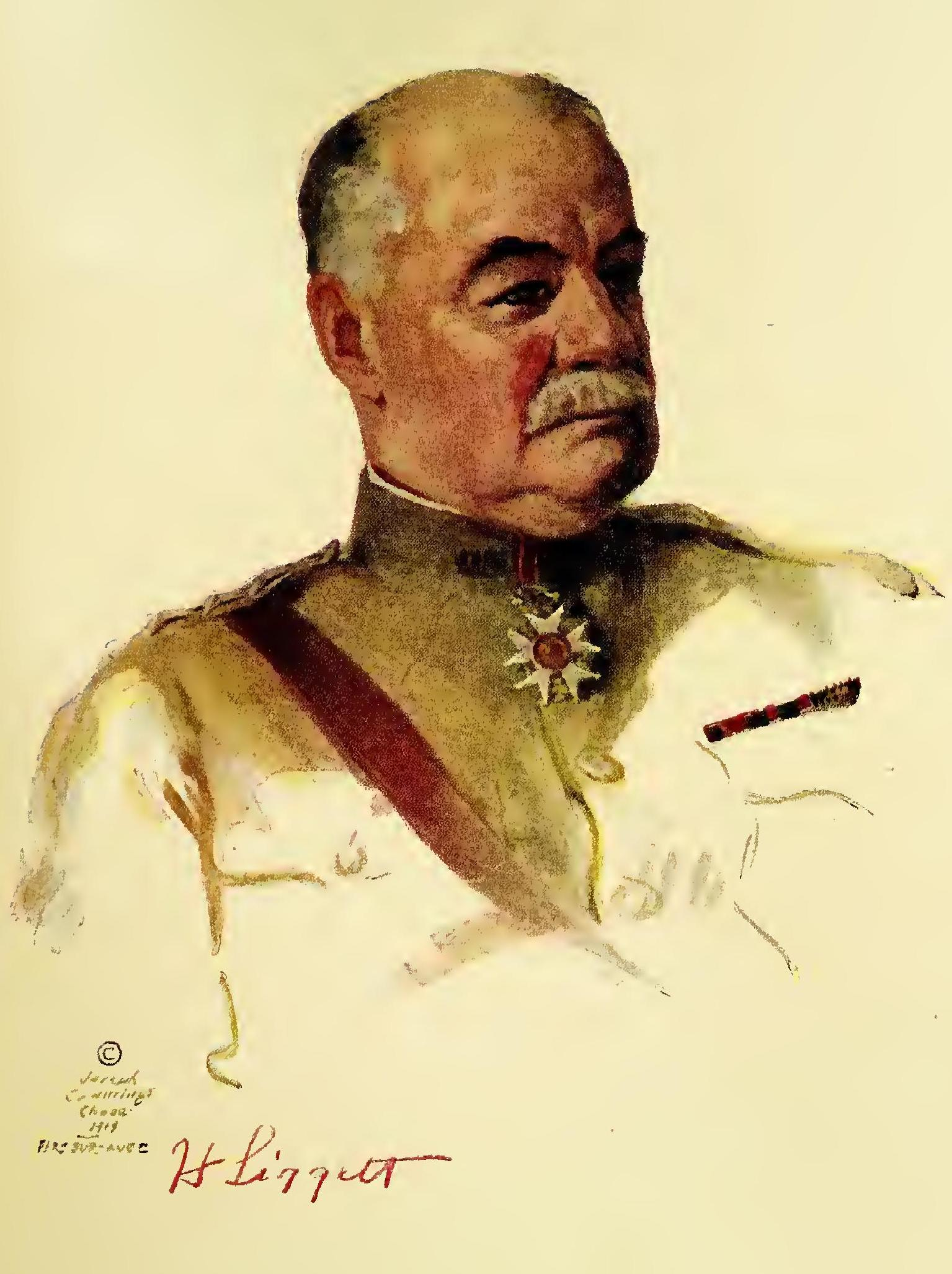
Portrait of Liggett from 1920's Soldier's All

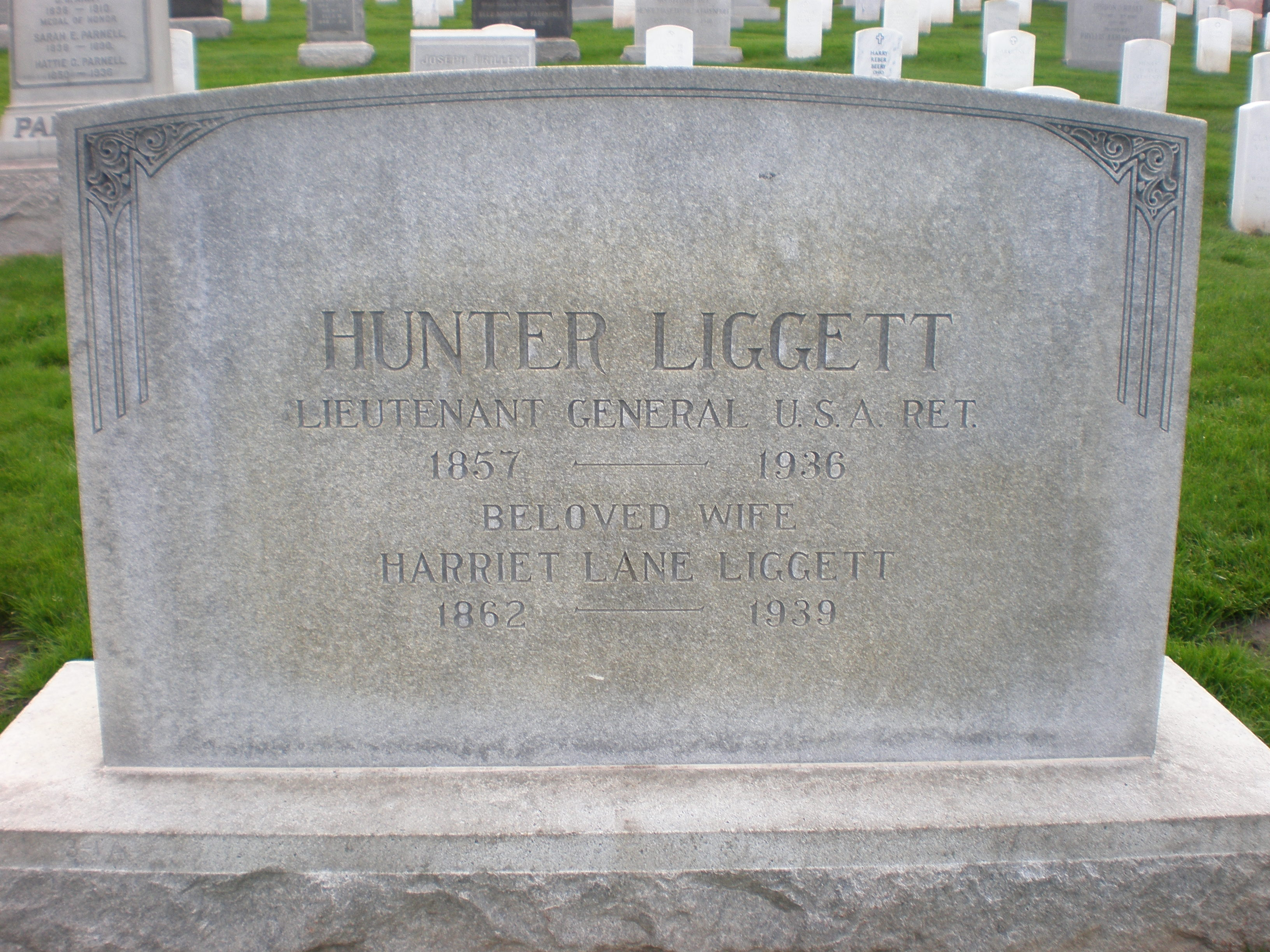
Liggett's gravestone at San Francisco National Cemetery

American entry into World War I happened in April 1917, and Liggett was assigned to San Francisco, where he commanded the Western Department from May to September. During his service at Fort William McKinley and in California, Liggett successfully requested Marshall's assignment as his aide-de-camp. He was then assigned to command the 41st Division, which he organized, trained, and led to France. In November 1917 he performed temporary duty as an observer of the front lines in France. In his post-war memoir, Liggett referred to a rumor that he was going to be denied a wartime field command for being overweight and too old with the aphorism that age and physical condition might be legitimate concerns, particularly if "the fat is above the collar." In January 1918, Liggett was assigned to command I Corps; he led this organization through October 1918 and took part in all major US operations, including the Saint-Mihiel offensive and Meuse–Argonne offensive. In October 1918, he was assigned to command First U.S. Army and promoted to lieutenant general. At the same time, Robert Lee Bullard was appointed to command Second Army as a lieutenant general; Liggett and Bullard were the army's only two lieutenant generals of the First World War. (Note: In 1942, Congress enacted legislation permitting World War I general officers to be advanced one grade if they had been recommended in writing for a promotion they did not receive, and if they had received the Medal of Honor, Distinguished Service Cross, or Army Distinguished Service Medal. Under these criteria, James G. Harbord and William M. Wright were promoted to lieutenant general on the retired list.) Throughout most of Liggett's service in France, his aide-de-camp was James Garesche Ord, who served as a major general in World War II.

In April 1919, Liggett was assigned to command Third Army during the Occupation of the Rhineland. He returned to the United States in July 1919, and was assigned to command the Western Department and Ninth Corps Area with headquarters in San Francisco. Liggett returned to the grade of major general in June 1920. In 1920, he received the honorary degree of LL.D. from the University of California, Berkeley. He left the army in March 1921, upon reaching the mandatory retirement age of 64. In 1930, Congress passed a law permitting the general officers of World War I to retire at their highest grade, and Liggett was promoted to lieutenant general on the retired list.

Liggett recounted his wartime experiences in 1928's A.E.F.: Ten Years Ago in France. He died in San Francisco on December 30, 1935. He was buried at San Francisco National Cemetery.

== Honors and awards ==
=== Military honors ===
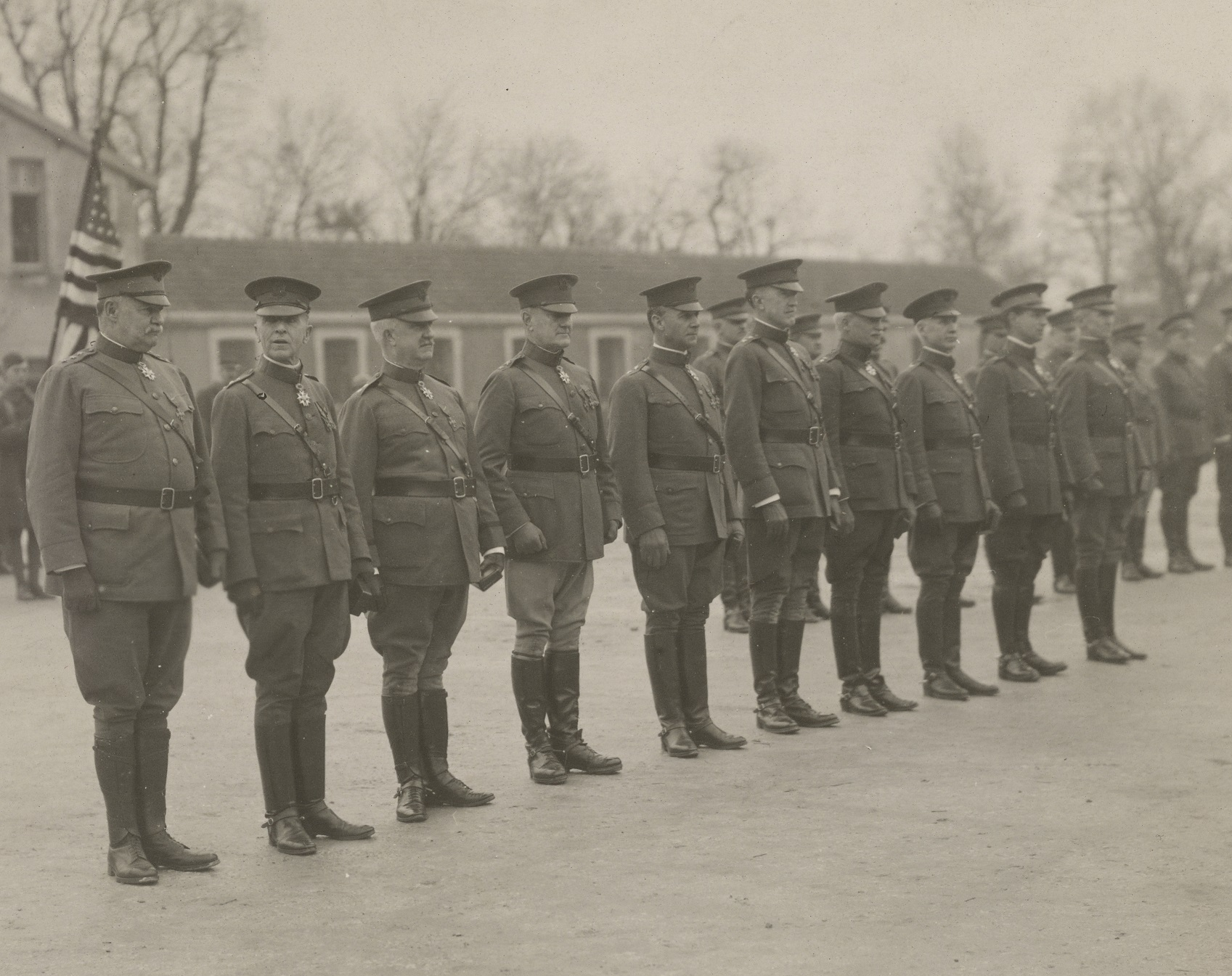
Hunter Liggett (1st on the left) with fellow US generals (left to right) Robert Bullard, James McAndrew, James Harbord, Charles Summerall, John Hines, Edward Mann Lewis, Michael Lenihan, William Mitchell and Frank Parker, after having been decorated with the "Commandeur" of the Légion d'honneur by Marshal Philippe Pétain in 1919.

Liggett's awards included:

American awards

Army Distinguished Service Medal
Indian Campaign Medal
Spanish War Service Medal
Philippine Campaign Medal
World War I Victory Medal
Army of Occupation of Germany Medal

Foreign awards

Légion d'honneur (France), class of Commandeur
Order of Leopold (Belgium), class of Commandeur
Order of Saints Maurice and Lazarus (Italy), class of Commendatore
Croix de Guerre with palm (France)

==== Army Distinguished Service medal citation ====
Citation

The President of the United States of America, authorized by Act of Congress, July 9, 1918, takes pleasure in presenting the Army Distinguished Service Medal to Lieutenant General Hunter Liggett, United States Army, for exceptionally meritorious and distinguished services to the Government of the United States, in a duty of great responsibility during World War I. As Commander of the 1st Army of the American Expeditionary Forces, General Liggett commanded the 1st Army Corps and perfected its organization under difficult conditions of early service in France, engaged in active operations in reduction of the Marne salient and of the St. Mihiel salient, and participated in the actions in the Forest of Argonne; in command of the 1st Army when German resistance was shattered west of the Meuse.

=== Other honors ===
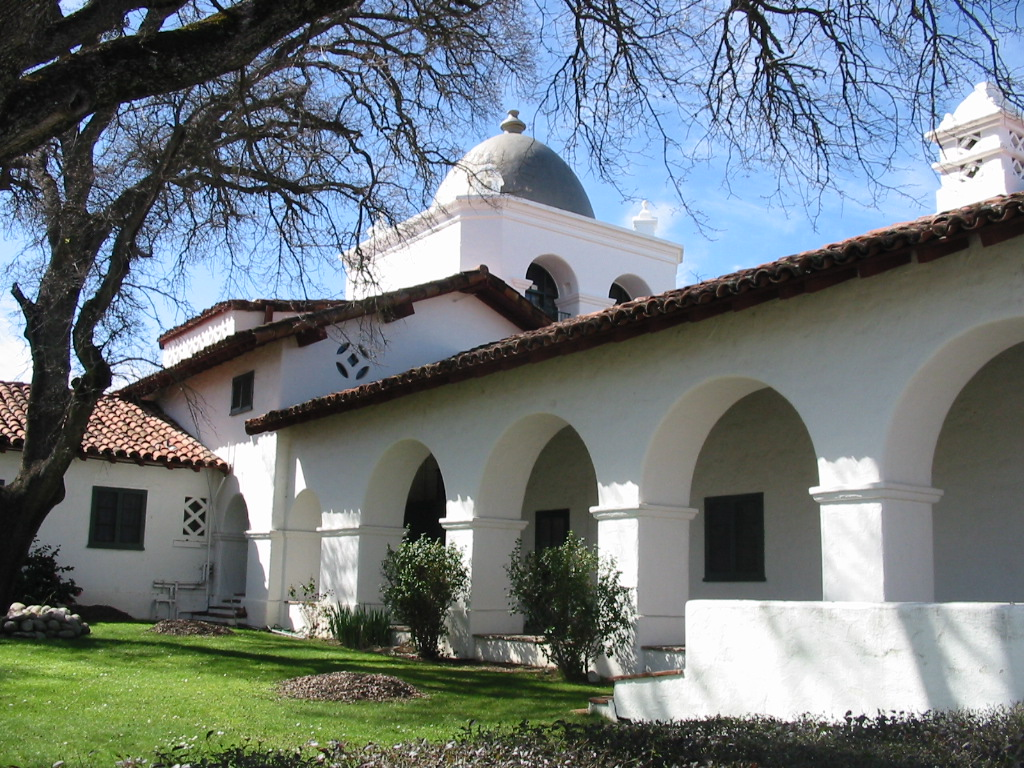
The Hacienda, a hotel located at Fort Hunter Liggett

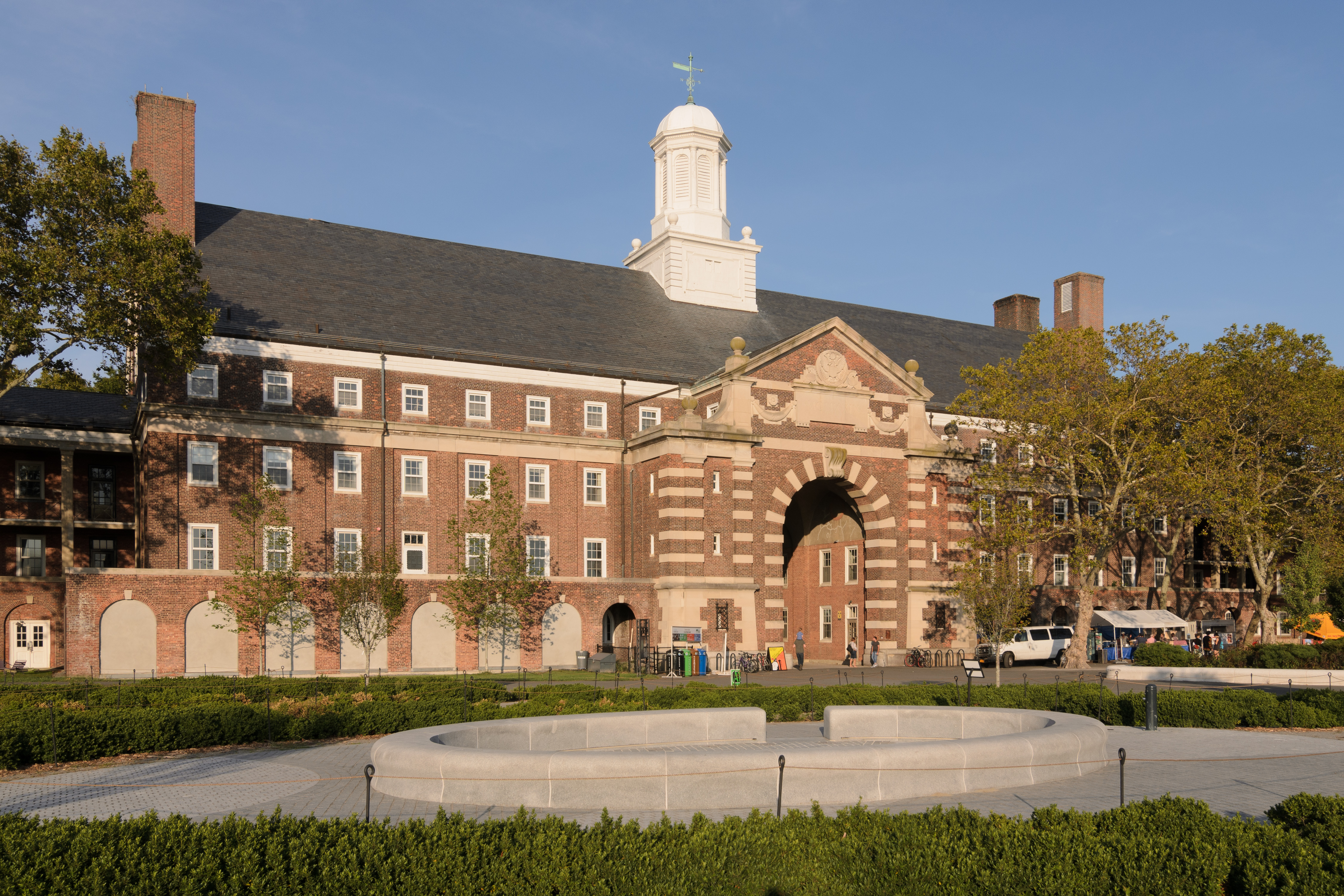
Liggett Hall in 2016

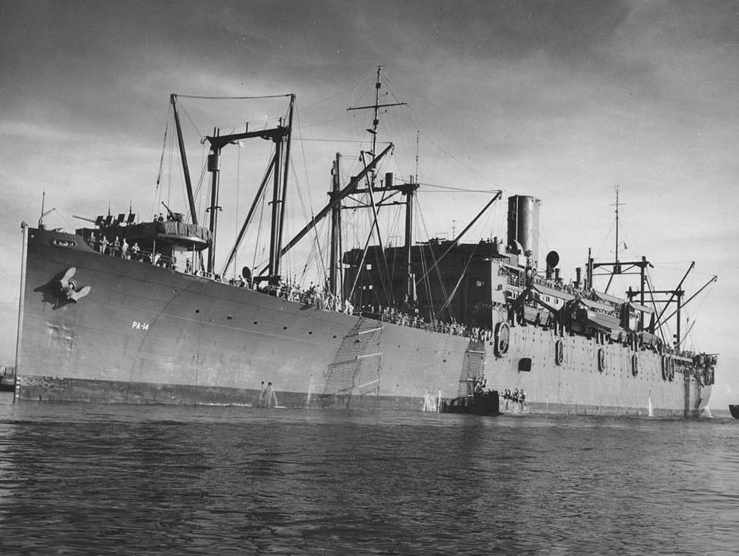
USS Hunter Liggett, c. 1943–1944

The U.S. Army named a base on California's central coast Fort Hunter Liggett.

Liggett Hall, now a central feature of Governors Island Park, was a regimental-sized barracks constructed at Fort Jay on Governors Island in New York Harbor. Completed in 1930, it was thought to be the largest building constructed by the U.S. Army and was the largest structure built under the supervision of the U.S. Army Quartermaster Corps prior to the construction of the Pentagon.

USS Hunter Liggett was a passenger ship that was transferred to the Army and renamed Hunter Liggett in February 1939. The ship transported personnel and supplies until May 27, 1941, when she was turned over to the Navy. Converted to Navy use at Brooklyn Navy Yard, she re-commissioned as AP-27 June 9, 1941, and then again reclassified APA-14 February 1, 1943, for the United States Coast Guard.

== Dates of rank ==
Liggett's dates of rank were:

Insignia	Rank	Component	Date
None	Cadet	United States Military Academy	1 July 1875
None in 1879	Second Lieutenant	Regular Army	13 June 1879
	First Lieutenant	Regular Army	27 June 1884
	Captain	Regular Army	1 June 1897
	Major	Volunteers	13 June 1898 (Honorably discharged from Volunteers on 12 April 1899.)
	Major	Volunteers	13 July 1899 (Honorably discharged from Volunteers on 18 June 1901.)
	Major	Regular Army	5 May 1902
	Lieutenant Colonel	Regular Army	5 June 1909
	Colonel	Regular Army	12 March 1912
	Brigadier General	Regular Army	5 March 1913
	Major General	Regular Army	6 March 1917 (Date of rank 22 March 1917.)
	Lieutenant General	Emergency	1 November 1918 (Date of rank 16 October 1918. Discharged and reverted to permanent rank 30 June 1920.)
	Major General	Retired List	21 March 1921 (Remained on active duty until 26 August 1921.)
	Lieutenant General	Retired List	21 June 1930

== See also ==
- List of United States Military Academy alumni
- List of major generals in the United States Regular Army before July 1, 1920
- List of lieutenant generals in the United States Army before 1960

== Bibliography ==
- Bigelow, Michael E. (May–June 1998). "Knowing and Doing". Military Review. Fort Leavenworth, Kansas: United States Army Command and General Staff College. pp. 64–72 – via Google Books.
- Harbord, James G. (1936). "Obituary, Hunter Liggett". Sixty-seventh Annual Report of the Association of the Graduates of the United States Military Academy. Newburgh, New York: Moore Printing Company. pp. 125–127 – via West Point Digital Library.
- Stackpole, Pierpont L. (2009). Ferrell, Robert H. (ed.). In the Company of Generals: The World War I Diary of Pierpont L. Stackpole. Columbia, Missouri: University of Missouri Press. ISBN 978-0-8262-1870-4. LCCN 2009028219. OCLC 318878435.
- Venzon, Anne Cipriano (2013). The United States in the First World War: An Encyclopedia. Hoboken, New Jersey: Taylor and Francis. pp. 343–345. ISBN 978-1-135-68453-2. OCLC 865332376.
- Zabecki, David T.; Mastriano, Douglas V., eds. (2020). Pershing's Lieutenants: American Military Leadership in World War I. New York: Osprey Publishing. ISBN 978-1-4728-3863-6.
- "Lieutenant General Hunter Liggett (1857–1935)". Californians and the Military. Rancho Cordova, California: California State Military History and Museums Program.

Military offices
Preceded by William Crozier	President of the United States Army War College; 1913–1914	Succeeded by Montgomery M. Macomb
Preceded by Thomas H. Barry	Commanding General Philippine Department; 1916−1917	Succeeded by Charles J. Bailey
Preceded by Newly activated organization	Commanding General I Corps; January−October 1918	Succeeded by Joseph T. Dickman
Preceded by John J. Pershing	Commanding General First Army; 1918−1919	Succeeded by Post deactivated
Preceded by Joseph T. Dickman	Commanding General Third Army; April–July 1919	Succeeded by Post deactivated
