= Samuel W. Miller =

US Army brigadier general (1857–1940)

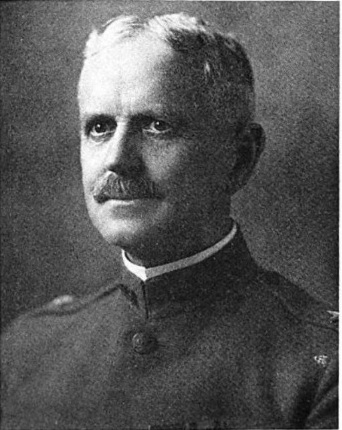
- Miller as a brigadier general in 1918
- Born: 10 February 1857; Huntingdon, Pennsylvania, US
- Died: 21 April 1940 (aged 83); Washington, DC, US
- Burial place: Arlington National Cemetery
- Alma mater: United States Military Academy
- Spouse(s): Cornelia Martha Carmon (m. 1860–1924) Alada Thurston (Paddock) Mills (m. 1925–1929)
- Children: 3
- Military career
- Service: United States Army
- Service years: 1879–1921
- Rank: Brigadier General
- Service number: 0-103 (Note: Generals In Khaki mistakenly identifies a photo of Billy Mitchell as Miller and a photo of Miller as Mitchell.)
- Unit: US Army Infantry Branch
- Commands: St. Francis Barracks; Anastasia Island; 25th Infantry Regiment; Fort Lawton; Fort George Wright; US Army School of Musketry; Port of Embarkation, Galveston, Texas; 10th Infantry Regiment; Camp E. S. Otis; US Army Director of Civilian Marksmanship; Officers Training Camp, Fort Niagara; 160th Depot Brigade; Camp Custer; 85th Division; 8th Brigade, 4th Division; US Army Infantry School of Arms; 165th Depot Brigade; National Guard Affairs, Eastern Department and Second Corps Area; Reserve Officers' Training Corps, Eastern Department
- Wars: American Indian Wars; Spanish–American War; Philippine–American War; World War I
- Awards: Silver Star

Samuel W. Miller (10 February 1857 – 21 April 1940) was a career officer in the United States Army. An 1879 graduate of the United States Military Academy at West Point, he was a veteran of the American Indian Wars, Spanish–American War, Philippine–American War, and World War I. Miller received the Silver Star for heroism during the Indian Wars and attained the rank of brigadier general. Miller's commands included the: 160th Depot Brigade; 8th Brigade, 4th Division; and 85th Division.

A native of Huntingdon, Pennsylvania, Miller graduated from West Point in 1879 and received his commission in the Infantry Branch. He served at posts in the western United States during the American Indian Wars, and received the silver Citation Star for heroism during a fight against the Hunkpapa. Miller performed stateside duty during the Spanish–American War, and in the Philippines during the Philippine–American War. Miller served in numerous command assignments as he advanced through the ranks, frequently as commandant of marksmanship schools or in non-standard assignments such as organizing the port of embarkation in Galveston, Texas.

In the years immediately prior to World War I, he visited several European countries to observe their methods of marksmanship instruction. During the war, he was promoted to temporary brigadier general and commanded Camp Custer and the 160th Depot Brigade, then the 4th Division's 8th Brigade. After the war, he was in charge of National Guard Affairs for the Second Corps Area and Eastern Department. Miller retired in 1921.

== Early life and start of career ==
Samuel Warren Miller was born in Huntingdon, Pennsylvania on 10 February 1857, a son of John S. Miller and Susan (Stewart) Miller. Miller was raised and educated in Huntingdon, and in 1875 received an appointment to the United States Military Academy (West Point) from US Representative R. Milton Speer. He graduated in 1879 ranked 58th of 67; among his classmates who also became general officers were William Dorrance Beach, John Skinner Mallory, James Anderson Irons, Lloyd Milton Brett, Albert Leopold Mills, John Alexander Johnston, Henry Alexander Greene, Frederick Steinman Foltz and Hunter Liggett. At graduation, he received his commission as a second lieutenant of Infantry.

Miller was initially assigned to frontier and scouting duty with the 5th Infantry Regiment at Fort Keogh, Montana until April 1882. This posting included fighting against the Hunkpapa on 8 March 1880 and 15 to 22 April 1881. He was assigned to frontier duty at Camp Poplar River, Montana until September 1882, when he returned to Fort Keogh. He remained at Fort Keough until May 1888, and was promoted to first lieutenant in March 1885. Miller took part in fighting against the Crow people in November 1887.

== Continued career ==
In May 1888, Miller was assigned to Fort Ringgold, Texas, where he served until September 1889. He was then assigned as quartermaster of the 5th Infantry at Fort Bliss, Texas, where he served until September 1893. From October 1891 to April 1892, he was the regiment's acting adjutant. From September 1893 to March 1894, he was assigned to St. Francis Barracks, Florida. His next posting was professor of military science and tactics at Purdue University in Indiana, where he remained until March 1898. He was promoted to captain in January 1898.

At the start of the Spanish–American War, Miller returned to St. Francis Barracks, Florida, and was assigned as commander of the post and the coastal artillery battery on nearby Anastasia Island, where he remained until July 1898. He then traveled to Tampa, Florida to prepare for transport to Cuba, but he became ill in August and was on sick leave until October. He was then assigned as mustering out officer for United States Volunteers in Pennsylvania, and he served there until July 1899. In August 1899, Miller was promoted to major of United States Volunteers and assigned to organize the 46th US Volunteer Infantry Regiment for service during the Philippine–American War. He served with the 46th US Infantry in the Philippines from October 1899 to May 1900. He was then assigned as acting inspector general of 1st Brigade, Department of Southern Luzon, where he served until July 1900. His next posting was acting inspector general of 2nd Brigade, Department of Southern Luzon, where he remained until April 1901. He was mustered out of the U.S. Volunteers in May 1901 and was on a leave of absence until June 1901.

== Later career ==
After returning to the United States, Miller performed recruiting duty in, Wheeling, West Virginia from June 1901 to April 1902. He then returned to the Philippines, where he served with the 5th Infantry until September 1902. In July 1902, he was promoted to major in the 19th Infantry Regiment, which he joined at the Presidio of San Francisco in December 1902. In July and August 1903, he was a member of the examining board that considered soldiers in Alaska Territory for promotion, including stops at Camp Skagway, Fort Egbert, Fort Gibbon, Fort St. Michael, and Fort Davis. In October 1903, he was an inspector and instructor for the state of Washington's annual National Guard encampment. Miller performed recruiting duties in Boston, Massachusetts from 1903 to 1905. After a four-month leave of absence, in April and May 1906, he was assigned as assistant military secretary for the staff of the Philippines Division. He was then detailed to inspector general duty for the Division of the Visayas in the Philippines, where he served until August. From September 1906 to April 1908, he was assigned as assistant to the inspector general of the Philippines Division. In June 1908, he returned to the United States and was assigned as inspector general of the Department of Dakota, June 8, 1908 to May 1910. In April 1910, he was promoted to lieutenant colonel in the 25th Infantry.

From May to July 1910, Miller was assigned to Fort Lawton, Washington as commander of the post and the 25th Infantry. In August 1910, he was assigned to maneuvers at Camp American Lake, Washington. He commanded the post at Fort George Wright, Washington, from August 1910 to April 14, 1911, including temporary duty as an observer at the Presidio of Monterey's School of Musketry from April to June 1910. He commanded the School of Musketry from July 1911 to October 1914, and he was promoted to colonel in November 1912. In 1912, Miller invented and fielded a self-registering aerial target. In 1913, he supervised the transfer of the School of Musketry to Fort Sill, Oklahoma. From February to July 1913, he was assigned to temporary duty as organizer and commander of the Port of Embarkation at Galveston, Texas. In April 1914, he was assigned to the 10th Infantry.

Miller was on temporary duty at the US embassy in Paris from August 1913 to June 1914 and conducted observation visits of several Schools of Musketry. In September 1913, he was part of the official party that attended Germany's annual Autumn Parade in Berlin and an official at German maneuvers near Breslau. Later in September, he was an official observer at French maneuvers near Toulouse. In October and November he was an observer of the School of Musketry at Walenstadt, Switzerland. He visited the School of Musketry at Wünsdorf, Germany in December 1913, and later that month he traveled to Hanover, Germany to observe development and implementation of a new system of small arms targets. At the end of December he visited military sites in Dresden, Munich, and Vienna. Miller attended the School of Musketry at Camp du Ruchard near Avon-les-Roches, France in March, 1914, and the School of Musketry at Camp de Châlons, France in early April 1914. From April to May, he attended the School of Musketry at Hythe, Kent, England. He toured military sites in London in June 1914, then traveled to Arbon, Switzerland to inspect newly fielded automatic rifles. From July to August, he served in the office of the Chief of Staff of the US Army, where he prepared a report on his European trip. In September and October 1914 he was at Fort Sill, where he drew up the plans for reorganizing the School of Musketry based on his observations.

== World War I and later life ==
In November 1914, Miller joined the 10th Infantry at Camp E. S. Otis in the Panama Canal Zone, and he commanded the regiment and the post until September 1916. In October and November 1916, he was executive officer of the National Marksmanship Matches in Jacksonville, Florida. In December 1916, he was appointed as the army's Director of Civilian Marksmanship, and he served until April 1917. American entry into World War I took place in April 1917, and from May to August 1917 Miller was commander of the Officers Training Camp at Fort Niagara, New York. In August 1917, he was promoted to temporary brigadier general and he was assigned to Camp Custer, Michigan as commander of the post and the 160th Depot Brigade. He commanded the 85th Division at Camp Custer in November and December 1917, then resumed command of the 160th Depot Brigade.

From January to March 1918, Miller was assigned to Camp Greene, North Carolina, as commander of 8th Brigade, 4th Division. While at Camp Greene, Miller was found physically disabled for overseas service and returned to his permanent rank of colonel. He was then assigned as commandant of the Infantry School of Arms, first at Fort Sill, then at Camp Benning, Georgia. From October 1918 to May 1919, he commanded the 165th Depot Brigade, including temporary beginning in December 1918 as president of the Board for Examination of Officers, which made recommendations on which officers to retain during the army's post-war force reduction.

In May 1919, Miller was posted to Governors Island, New York as officer in charge of National Guard affairs for the Eastern Department and Second Corps Area. While in this position, he also served as the department and corps area education and recreation officer from November 1919 to December 1920. He was the department athletic officer in November and December 1919. From November 1919 to February 1921, he was the department and corps area inspector of small arms practice. Miller was officer in charge of the Eastern Department's Reserve Officers' Training Corps programs from January to February 1920. In January and February 1920, he acted as the department's chief of staff for operations and assistant chief of staff for war plans and training. Miller left the army upon reaching the mandatory retirement age of 64 in February 1921.

== Personal ==
After retiring, Miller resided in Washington, DC. He traveled extensively, both overseas and throughout the United States. In 1930, the US Congress enacted legislation permitting the general officers of World War I to retire at their highest rank, and Miller was advanced to brigadier general on the retired list. He died at Walter Reed Army Hospital on 21 April 1940. Miller was buried at Arlington National Cemetery.

=== Family ===
In 1881, Miller married Cornelia Martha "Minnie Carmon. They were married until her death in 1924 and were the parents of three children, a son who died young and two daughters who lived to adulthood. In 1925, he married Alada Thurston (Paddock) Mills, the widow of Albert Leopold Mills.

== Awards ==
Miller received the silver Citation Star for heroism during American Indian Wars fighting against the Hunkpapa along Armells Creek near Miles City, Montana on 8 March 1880. When the Silver Star medal was created in 1932, Miller's Citation Star was converted to the new award. The citation read:

"For gallantry in action against hostile Uncupapa Sioux Indians on Emmell Creek, Montana, Mar. 8, 1880."

== Dates of rank ==
Miller's dates of rank were:

- Brigadier General (Retired), 21 June 1930
- Colonel (Retired), 10 February 1921
- Colonel, 19 March 1918
- Brigadier General (National Army), 5 August 1917
- Colonel, 2 November 1912
- Lieutenant Colonel, 2 April 1910
- Major, 30 July 1902
- Captain, 31 May 1901
- Major (United States Volunteers), 19 August 1899
- Captain, 26 January 1898
- First Lieutenant, 7 March 1885
- Second Lieutenant, 13 June 1879
