= Frederick Steinman Foltz =

United States Army general

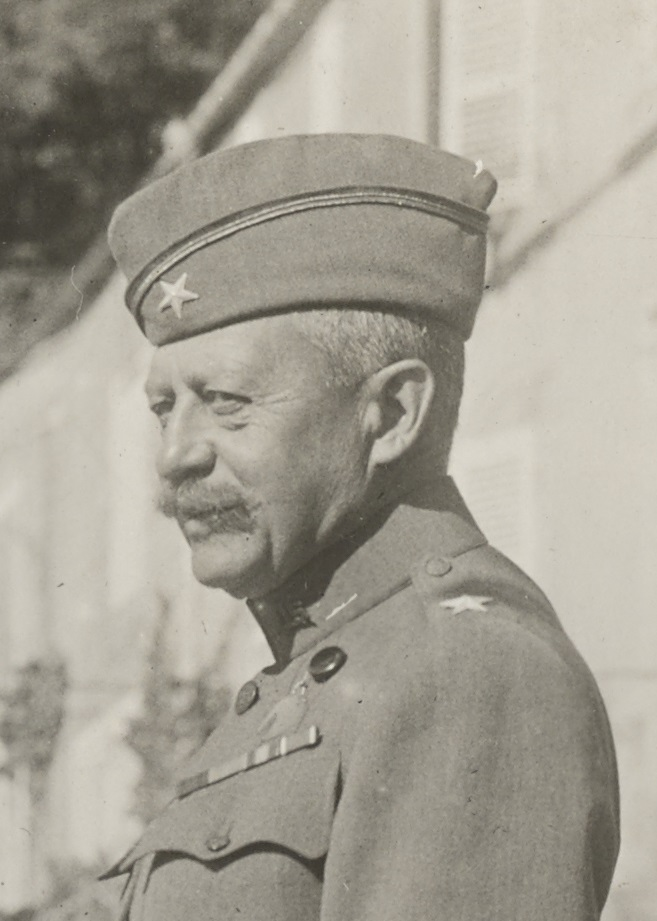
- Brigadier General Frederick S. Foltz as commander of the 182nd Brigade in France, September 1918.
- Born: December 15, 1857; Lancaster, Pennsylvania, United States
- Died: August 28, 1952 (aged 94); Washington, D.C., United States
- Burial place: Arlington National Cemetery, Virginia, United States
- Spouse: Mary F. Keefer
- Relatives: Jonathan M. Foltz (father)
- Military career
- Allegiance: United States
- Branch: United States Army
- Service years: 1879–1921
- Rank: Brigadier General
- Service number: 0-122
- Unit: Cavalry Branch
- Commands: 1st Cavalry Regiment; 182nd Brigade; 91st Division; 6th Cavalry Regiment
- Conflicts: American Indian Wars; Spanish–American War; World War I

Brigadier General Frederick Steinman Foltz (December 15, 1857 – August 28, 1952) was a United States Army officer in the late 19th and early 20th centuries. He served in the Spanish–American War and World War I, among other incidents and conflicts.

== Early life and education ==
Foltz on born on December 25, 1857, in Lancaster, Pennsylvania. His father, Jonathan M. Foltz, would serve as Surgeon General of the United States Navy. After graduating from the Episcopal Academy, Foltz entered the United States Military Academy (USMA) at West Point, New York, graduating in 1879. Among his classmates included several general officers of the future, such as William D. Beach, John S. Mallory, James A. Irons, Lloyd M. Brett, Albert L. Mills, John A. Johnston, Henry A. Greene, Hunter Liggett and Samuel W. Miller.

== Military career ==
Foltz was commissioned into the 1st Cavalry Regiment, and he did frontier duty in the far Northwest. After serving as an assistant professor at USMA from 1884 to 1888, Foltz returned to frontier duty in the Northwest from 1888 to 1891. During this time, he guarded the border with Canada to ensure that hostile Indians could not escape to the country, and he explored and mapped the area that became Glacier National Park. Foltz participated in the Spanish–American War, serving in Cuba and Puerto Rico, and in the positions of quartermaster in the Second Cavalry Brigade and then as an intelligence officer under General Nelson A. Miles. He participated in the Battle of San Juan Hill, and after the war, he served as a customs collector and an inspector general, and later as chief of police, chief of secret police, provost-marshal, and captain of the Port of Havana.

Foltz, returned to the United States in 1902, serving in several locations, including in Washington, D.C., Fort Ethan Allen, and Fort Myer. During this time, he served on the board that adopted the M1903 Springfield rifle, and he played a key role in the Army's adoption of the English-type officer's saddle. After serving in the Philippines from 1903 to 1906, he became the governor of the province of Havana in Cuba in 1908. In 1911, Foltz served as the head of the American Army team at the horse show of the coronation of George V, and in 1912, he was in charge of the American Army team at the horse show of the 1912 Summer Olympics. He became a colonel on September 27, 1914, and assumed command of the 1st Cavalry Regiment.

On August 5, 1917, after the American entry into World War I, Foltz was promoted to the temporary rank of brigadier general and assumed command of the 182nd infantry Brigade of the American Expeditionary Forces. From December 25, 1917, to June 19, 1918, he commanded the 91st Division.

Foltz, after commanding the 6th Cavalry Regiment from December 1918 until January 1921, reverted to his permanent rank of colonel after World War I ended, though Congress restored his rank in June 1930, and he retired from the Army in 1921. In retirement, he worked as a landscape artist and displayed his work at the Corcoran Gallery of Art.

Foltz was the last-surviving member of his USMA class and was the oldest living graduate of West Point from January 30 to August 28, 1952. He died on the latter date in Washington, D.C., and he is buried at Arlington National Cemetery.

== Personal life ==
Foltz married Mary Keefer on July 11, 1883. They had no children together.

== Bibliography ==
- Davis, Henry Blaine Jr. (1998). Generals in Khaki. Raleigh, North Carolina: Pentland Press. ISBN 1571970886. OCLC 40298151.
- Marquis Who's Who (1975). Who Was Who In American History – The Military. Chicago, Illinois: Marquis Who's Who. ISBN 0837932017.
