= William Dorrance Beach =

United States Army general

William Beach
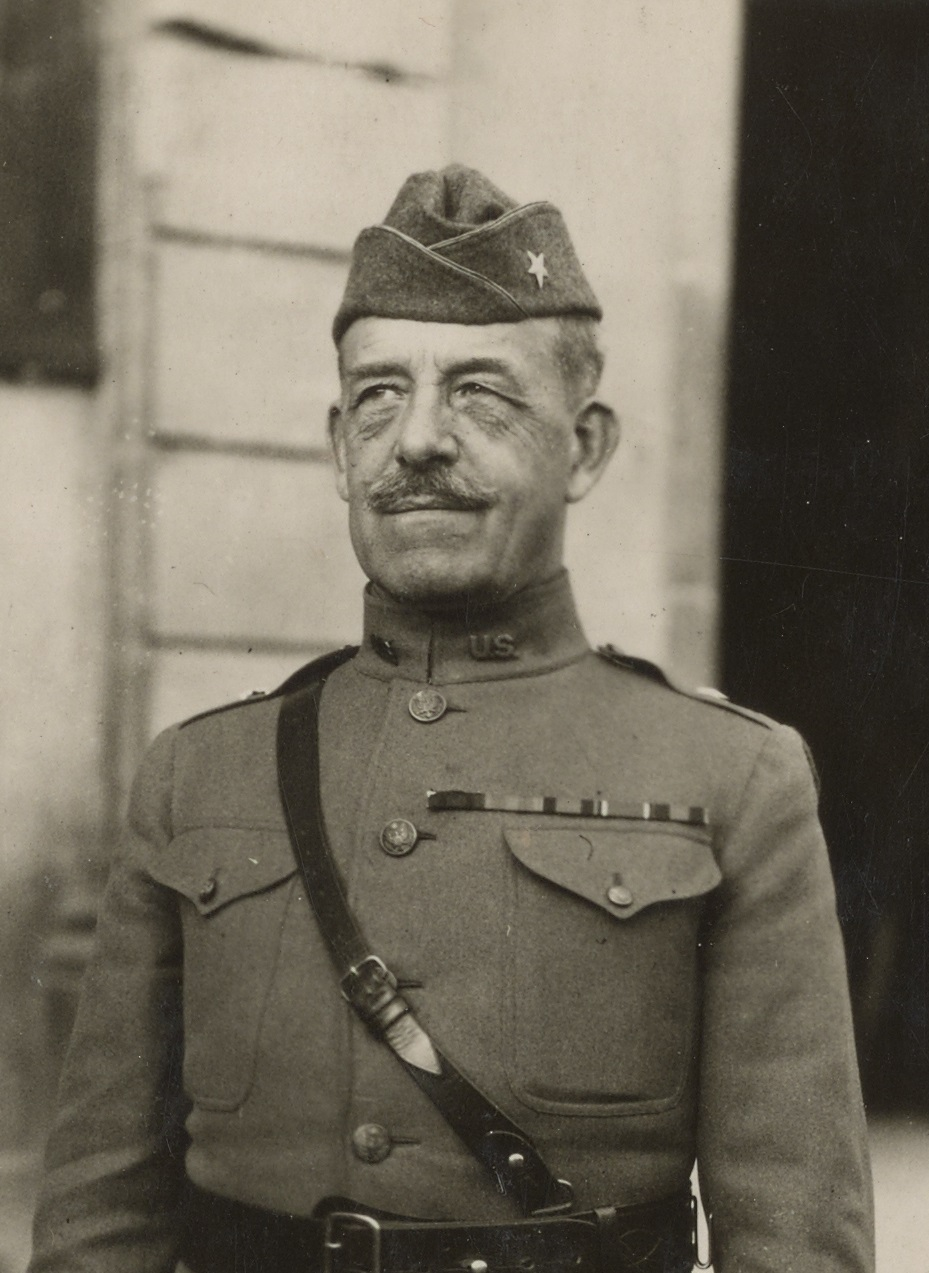
- Brigadier General William D. Beach as commander of the 176th Brigade in November 1918.
- Born: June 18, 1856; Brooklyn, New York, United States
- Died: June 18, 1932 (aged 76)
- Military career
- Allegiance: United States
- Branch: United States Army
- Service years: 1879−1920
- Rank: Brigadier General
- Service number: 0-13443
- Unit: Cavalry Branch
- Commands: 8th Cavalry Regiment; 176th Brigade; 88th Division
- Conflicts: Spanish–American War; Pancho Villa Expedition; World War I
- Awards: Army Distinguished Service Medal; Silver Star (2); Croix de Guerre (France); Officier of the Legion of Honor (France)

Brigadier General William Dorrance Beach (June 18, 1856 – June 18, 1932) was a United States Army officer active during World War I.

== Early life ==
Beach was born in Brooklyn, New York, the son of Joshua Munson Beach. After attending a private school in New Jersey, Beach went to public schools in New York before entering the United States Military Academy (USMA) at West Point, New York. He graduated number twenty-four of sixty-four in the class of 1879. Among his classmates included several general officers of the future, such as Hunter Liggett, John S. Mallory, James A. Irons, Lloyd M. Brett, Albert L. Mills, John A. Johnston, Henry A. Greene, Frederick S. Foltz and Samuel W. Miller.

== Military career ==
Upon graduation, Beach was commissioned in the Third Cavalry and performed frontier duty until 1883. He participated in the Ute Expedition in 1879 and from 1882 to 1883 he was on the Apache Expedition. From 1884 to 1888, Beach was an assistant professor at the USMA, after which he was on the Mexican border with troops in 1891 and 1892. From 1892 to 1898, Beach was an instructor at the Infantry and Cavalry School at Fort Leavenworth, Kansas.

During the Spanish–American War, he was a major and Chief Engineer of the cavalry division in the Fifth Corps in Cuba. From 1900 to 1902, he was in the Philippines, and from 1903 to 1906 he was on duty with the War Department General Staff as chief of the military information division. He traveled back to Cuba and was governor of Santa Clara Province. From 1910 to 1912, Beach again traveled to the Philippines and became Chief of Staff of the Philippine Division.

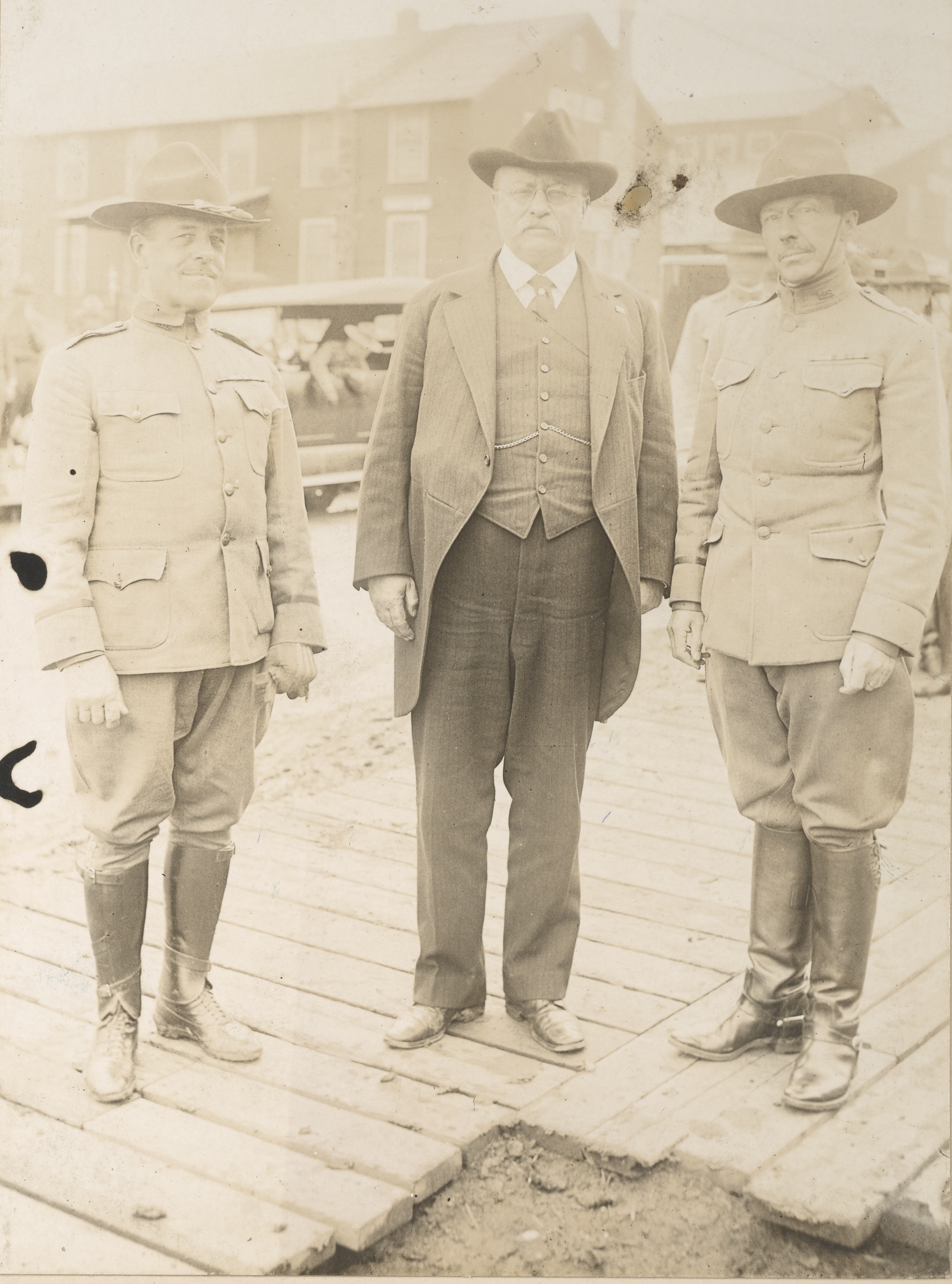
Theodore Roosevelt visits Beach (left) and Stephen M. Foote (right), Camp Dodge, Iowa.

In 1916, he commanded the Eighth Cavalry on the Mexican border, and in 1917, after the American entry into World War I, he became a brigadier general and commanded the 176th Brigade. From May to September 1918, Beach commanded the 88th Division, the 176th Brigade's parent formation. Upon his return to the United States, he performed as executive officer of Camp Jackson, South Carolina, until his retirement in 1920.

Beach retired as a colonel but was promoted on the retired list to brigadier general in 1927.

== Awards ==
Beach received two Silver Star Citations and the Army Distinguished Service Medal from the United States. He also received the Frenfh Croix de Guerre with palms and Officier of the Legion of Honor from France. His DSM citation reads:

The President of the United States of America, authorized by Act of Congress, July 9, 1918, takes pleasure in presenting the Army Distinguished Service Medal to Brigadier General William Dorrance Beach, United States Army, for exceptionally meritorious and distinguished services to the Government of the United States, in a duty of great responsibility during World War I. As Commanding Officer, 176th Infantry Brigade, 88th Division, General Beach displayed organizing and training abilities of the highest order, and by the sound judgment, constant initiative, resourcefulness, and indefatigable energy, abundant tack, and thorough understanding of men which characterized his performance of duty as Brigade Commander, he contributed materially to successful operations of that Brigade and the 88th Division.

== Death and legacy ==
William Dorrance Beach died at the age of seventy-six on June 18, 1932. He was buried at Fort Leavenworth National Cemetery.

== Bibliography ==
- Davis, Henry Blaine Jr. Generals in Khaki. Raleigh, NC: Pentland Press, 1998. ISBN 1-57197-088-6 OCLC 231779136
- Marquis Who's Who, Inc. Who Was Who in American History, the Military. Chicago: Marquis Who's Who, 1975. ISBN 0-8379-3201-7 OCLC 657162692
- "Valor Awards for William Dorrance Beach." Military Times, n.d. Web. 17 Aug. 2016.
