= Jonathan M. Foltz =

United States military surgeon

Commodore Jonathan Messersmith Foltz
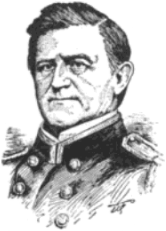
- Born: April 25, 1810; Lancaster, Pennsylvania
- Died: April 12, 1877 (aged 66); Philadelphia, Pennsylvania
- Relatives: Frederick Steinman Foltz (son)
- Military career
- Allegiance: United States of America
- Branch: United States Navy
- Service years: 1831–1872
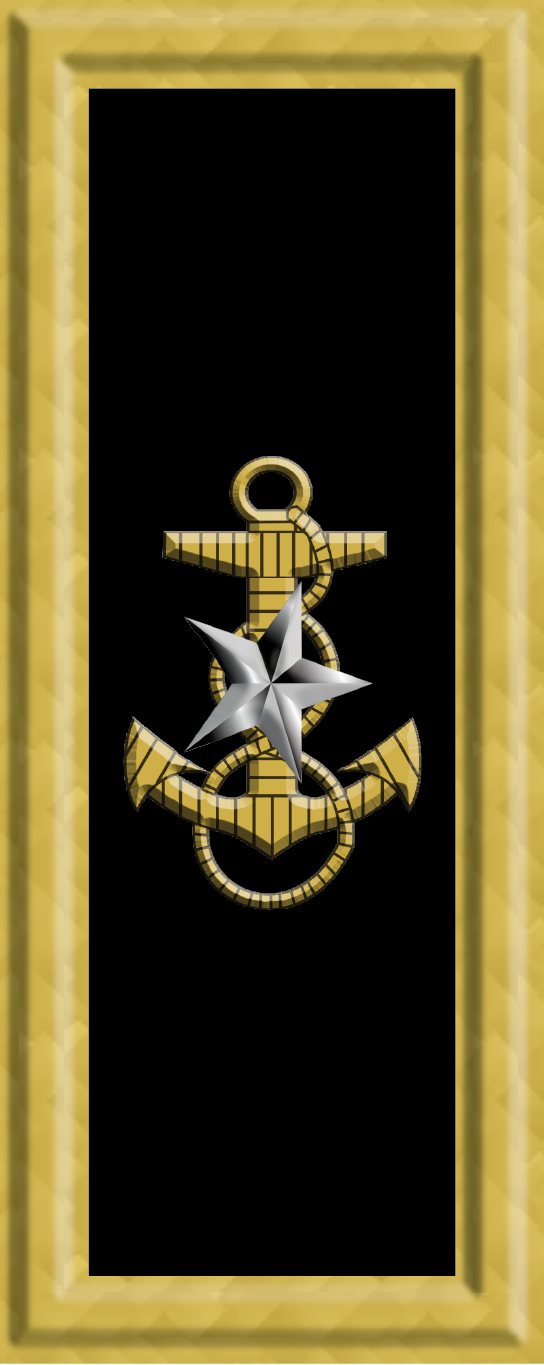
- Rank: Commodore
- Commands: Chief of the Bureau of Medicine and Surgery and Surgeon General
- Conflicts: First Sumatran Expedition; Mexican–American War; American Civil War

Jonathan Messersmith Foltz (April 25, 1810 – April 12, 1877) was a military surgeon of the United States Navy, who served in the Mexican–American War and American Civil War, eventually rising to the rank of commodore and serving as Surgeon General of the United States Navy in 1871–72. He was the father of Frederick Steinman Foltz.

== Biography ==
Foltz was born in Lancaster, Pennsylvania. He studied medicine as the apprentice of Dr. William Thompson from 1825 to 1828, and graduated from Jefferson Medical College, Philadelphia, in 1830.

Foltz entered the Navy as an assistant surgeon on April 4, 1831, serving aboard the frigate Potomac, and in February 1832 landed with the storming party at Quallah Battoo, Sumatra, being specially commended in Lieutenant Irvine Shubrick's official dispatch. Potomac finally returned to Boston in June 1834, and Foltz then served at the Medical Bureau, Washington, DC, being stationed at Washington Navy Yard. In 1835, he published his observations on the voyage of the Potomac, and in 1837 received an honorary degree of Master of Arts from Yale College. In February 1838, he was present at the duel between William J. Graves and Jonathan Cilley.

On December 8, 1838, Foltz was examined and received promotion to the rank of Surgeon in the Navy, and on April 1, 1839, was appointed Surgeon of the Naval Hospital at Port Mahon, Menorca. On 13 March 1841, he was assigned to the frigate Brandywine, and on October 30, 1843, to the frigate Raritan. Between 1844 and 1846, he served as Fleet Surgeon aboard the Raritan during the Mexican–American War and was present at the battles of Palo Alto and Resaca de la Palma, the blockade of Vera Cruz, and the battles of Alvarado and Tabasco.

Foltz remained aboard Raritan in the Brazil Squadron until 1847, and served in the Jamestown of the same squadron in 1851–54. He was fleet surgeon of the Western Gulf Squadron in 1862–63, and was with David Farragut on the Hartford in all his battles during those years. He occupied the same place on the Franklin during Farragut's voyage to Europe in 1867–68.

Foltz was president of the naval medical board in 1870–71, of which he was one of the founding members in 1857. He became medical director on March 3, 1871, and was appointed "Chief of the Bureau of Medicine and Surgery" and "Surgeon General", with the rank of commodore, on October 25 of that year. He was placed on the retired list on April 25, 1872.

== Publications ==
- The Medical Statistics and Observations during a Voyage around the World, on board the United States Frigate "Potomac", in the years 1831-4 (1835)
- The Pernicious Fevers of Africa (1838)
- On the Employment of Steamships of War in the United States Navy (1842)
- On the Endemic Influence of Evil Government as illustrated in the Island of Minorca, with Notes on the Climate, Topography, and Diseases of the Island (1843)
