= 194th Armored Brigade =

194th Armor Brigade
- 194th Armor Brigade combat service identification badge
- Active: 24 June 1921–31 March 1946 (various designations); 25 March 1948–15 July 1962 (97th Recon. Troop, Mech.); 15 July 1962–29 June 1995 (194th Armored Bge.); 9 November 2006–present
- Country: United States
- Branch: United States Army
- Type: Armor brigade
- Role: Armor One Station Unit Training
- Size: Brigade (1,900) Mobilization(5,000-7,000)
- Part of: United States Army Armor School
- Garrison/HQ: Fort Benning
- Motto: Thunderbolts Of Battle
- Engagements: World War II; Central Europe

Commanders
- Current Commander: COL Buck Carroll
- Command Sergeant Major: CSM Nick Garcia

Insignia
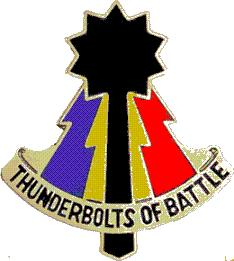
- Distinctive Unit Insignia

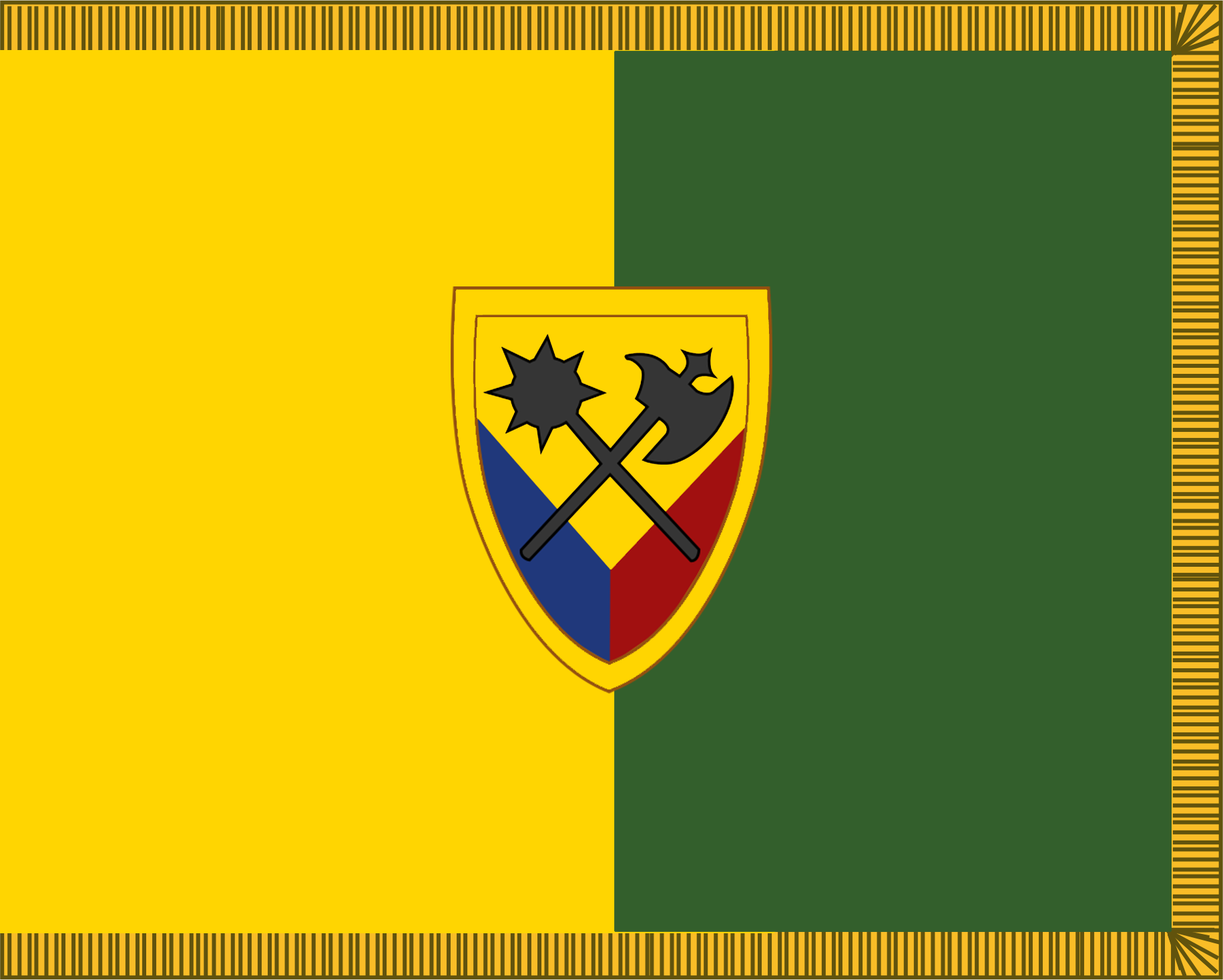
- 194th Armored Brigade Flag

The 194th Armored Brigade is a separate brigade of the US Army. All armor, cavalry, and armor and cavalry mechanic soldiers, and Marines in equivalent specialties, are trained by the 194th under the armor component of the Maneuver Center of Excellence at Fort Benning, Georgia, where the 194th has been garrisoned since 2012.

== History ==
In 1962, the 194th Armored Brigade was created and assigned to the US Army's Combat Developments Command to test new materiel at Fort Ord, California. It assumed the mission of the tank battalion of the 5th Infantry Division previously there. The next change occurred in the mid-1960s amid Army-wide reductions to make resources available for the Vietnam War. In a personnel-saving action, the Combat Developments Command's 194th Armored Brigade at Fort Ord was replaced by a battalion-size combat team and reorganized at Fort Knox to support the Armor School in place of the 16th Armored Group. Under the new configuration, the brigade included one mechanized infantry and two armored battalions. The brigade was cannibalized to fill out CONUS-based III Corps units deploying to Saudi Arabia for Operation Desert Shield and Desert Storm.

== Historical composition ==
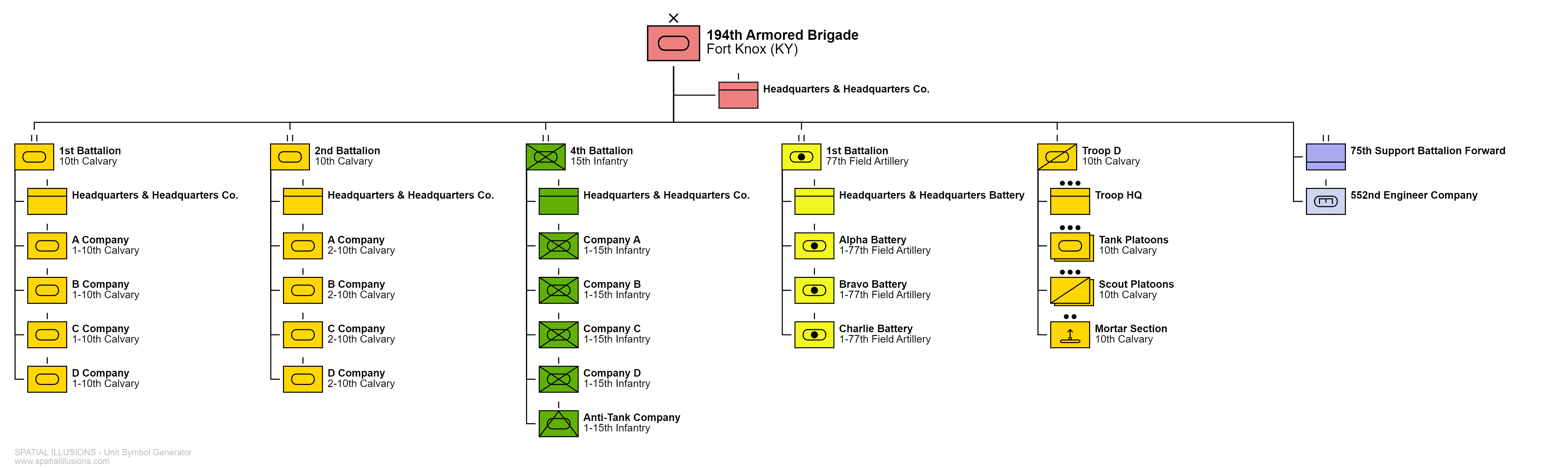
194th Armored Brigade (Separate) Organization 1989

David Isby & Charles Kamps Jr., record the composition of the 194th Armored Brigade (Separate) in 1984 in Armies of NATO’s Central Front as including:

- 4th Battalion, 54th Infantry
- 5th Battalion, 73d Armor
- 5th Battalion, 33d Armor
- 5th Battalion, 41st Field Artillery
- D Troop, 10th Cavalry
- 522d Engineer Company
- 3rd Battalion, 3rd Field Artillery

The following units were assigned to the 194th Armored Brigade (Separate) in 1990.:

- HHC, 194th Armored Brigade
- 1st Battalion, 10th Cavalry
- 2d Battalion, 10th Cavalry
- D Troop, 10th Cavalry
- 4th Battalion, 15th Infantry
- 19th Engineer Battalion
- 75th Support Battalion
- 1st Battalion, 77th Field Artillery
- MP Platoon

The brigade downsized to primarily the 19th Engineer Battalion and Task Force 1st Battalion, 10th Cavalry. The task force consisted of a headquarters company that included Cav Scouts (HMMWV and silenced motorcycle), medics, and indirect fire infantry (mechanized mortars/M106), three armored companies (M1A2, then M1A3 Abrams), two infantry companies (mechanized) and one field artillery battery (Battery A, 77th Field Artillery - M109 SP 155mm) and a squadron of AH-64 Apaches.

The brigade was reduced to a separate battalion task force in 1993, the 2d Battalion, 33d Armor, of which at least three companies were tank and one was mechanized infantry, with sources also mentioning artillery and Bradley M-3 scout companies.

2–33 AR Task Force was finally disbanded in mid-late 1994.

== Current configuration ==
The 194th Armored Brigade designation has been restored to active duty. It assumed command of the 1st Armored Training Brigade at Fort Knox, Kentucky, and is now charged with the responsibility of One Station Unit Training (OSUT), which trains tankers and cavalry scouts. The brigade includes the 30th Adjutant General Battalion, which primarily conducts reception operations for soldiers going to Advanced Individual Training, Basic Training and One Station Unit Training.

The 194th Armored Brigade was reactivated at Fort Benning, Georgia where it serves as One Station Unit Training. It consists of:

- Headquarters and Headquarters Company (HHC)
- 2nd Squadron, 15th Cavalry Regiment
- 1st Battalion, 81st Armor
- 5th Squadron, 15th Cavalry Regiment
- 30th Adjutant General Battalion (reception)

== Lineage and honors ==
=== Lineage ===
- Constituted 24 June 1921 in the Organized Reserves as Headquarters and Headquarters Company, 194th Infantry Brigade, and assigned to the 97th Infantry Division
- Organized in June 1922 at Concord, New Hampshire
- Redesignated 23 March 1925 as Headquarters and Headquarters Company, 194th Brigade
- Redesignated 24 August 1936 as Headquarters and Headquarters Company, 194th Infantry Brigade
- Converted and redesignated 12 February 1942 as the 3d Platoon, 97th Reconnaissance Troop, 97th Division (Headquarters and Headquarters Company, 193d Infantry Brigade, concurrently converted and redesignated as the 97th Reconnaissance Troop, [less 3d Platoon], 97th Division)
- Troop ordered into active military service 25 February 1943 and reorganized at Camp Swift, Texas, as the 97th Cavalry Reconnaissance Troop, an element of the 97th Infantry Division
- Reorganized and redesignated 1 August 1943 as the 97th Reconnaissance Troop, Mechanized
- Reorganized and redesignated 15 October 1945 as the 97th Mechanized Cavalry Reconnaissance Troop
- Inactivated 31 March 1946 in Japan
- (Organized Reserves redesignated 25 March 1948 as the Organized Reserve Corps; redesignated 9 July 1952 as the Army Reserve)
- 3d Platoon, 97th Mechanized Cavalry Reconnaissance Troop converted and redesignated 15 July 1962 as Headquarters and Headquarters Company, 194th Infantry Brigade, and relieved from assignment to the 97th Infantry Division; concurrently withdrawn from the Army Reserve and allotted to the Regular Army (remainder of troop concurrently converted and redesignated as Headquarters and Headquarters Company, 193d Infantry Brigade—hereafter separate lineage)
- Converted and redesignated 1 October 1962 as Headquarters and Headquarters Company, 194th Armored Brigade
- Activated 21 December 1962 at Fort Ord, California
- Inactivated 29 June 1995 at Fort Knox, Kentucky
- Transferred 9 November 2006 to the United States Army Training and Doctrine Command
- Headquarters activated 10 July 2007 at Fort Knox, Kentucky

=== Campaign participation credit ===
- World War II: Central Europe

· Parts of the 194th deployed for Operations Desert Shield/Desert Storm/Provide Comfort in 1990–1991

· Parts of the 194th Deployed to Florida for Hurricane Andrew Relief in 1992

· Parts of the 194th deployed to Somalia for Operation Restore Hope in 1992–1993

- parts of the 194th deployed to Haiti for Operation Uphold Democracy in 1994
