= Frederick Emil Resche =

U.S. Army brigadier general

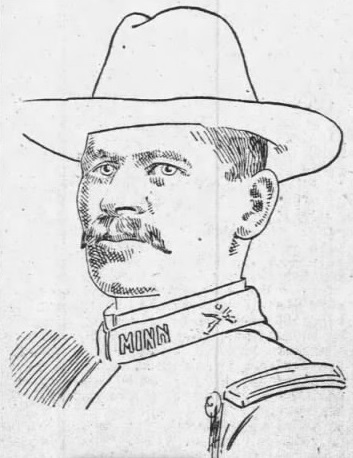
- Minneapolis Daily Times, May 3, 1896
- Born: April 1, 1866; Chemnitz, Kingdom of Saxony
- Died: September 3, 1946 (aged 80); Glendale, California, U.S.
- Burial place: Forest Lawn Memorial Park, Glendale, California
- Spouse: Clara Simmen (m. 1889–1946)
- Military career
- Allegiance: United States; Minnesota
- Service: United States Army; Minnesota National Guard
- Service years: 1888–1918
- Rank: Brigadier General
- Unit: 34th Division
- Commands: Company C, 3rd Minnesota Infantry Regiment; 3rd Battalion, 3rd Minnesota Infantry; 3rd Minnesota Infantry; 1st Minnesota Brigade; 68th Infantry Brigade
- Wars: American Indian Wars; Spanish–American War; Pancho Villa Expedition; World War I
- Other work: Police officer Probation officer

Frederick Emil Resche (April 1, 1866 – September 3, 1946) was an American law enforcement official and military officer from Duluth, Minnesota. A longtime member of the Minnesota National Guard, he was a veteran of the American Indian Wars, Spanish–American War, Pancho Villa Expedition, and World War I. Resche was most notable for his First World War command of the 68th Infantry Brigade, a unit of the 34th Division.

== Early life ==
Frederick E. Resche was born in Chemnitz, Kingdom of Saxony (now Germany) on April 1, 1866, the son of Frederick J. and Amalia Resche. He was educated in Saxony, trained as a woodworker, and was 17 when he immigrated to the United States in 1882. For the first few years after his arrival in the United States, he worked on cattle ranges in New Mexico and Colorado. Resche settled in Duluth, Minnesota in 1885 and became a naturalized American citizen. He worked as a cabinet maker, and in 1892 he received a patent for an improved plug-cutting tool. Resche was also active in the organized labor movement and served as secretary of Duluth's carpenters' union.

== Civilian career ==
In the early 1890s, Resche joined the Duluth Police Department as a communications systems operator, and he subsequently became a uniformed officer. Resche advanced to the rank of captain, and was the department's recognized expert on the Bertillon system of cataloguing the identities of criminals and criminal suspects.

In 1907, Resche resigned from the police department to accept appointment as probation officer for St. Louis County, Minnesota. While working as a probation officer, he continued to assist the police department in maintaining its Bertillon system files. He advanced to chief probation officer, and continued to serve until retiring in 1936.

== Military career ==
=== Start of career ===
In 1888, Resche joined the Minnesota National Guard as a private in Company K, 2nd Minnesota Infantry Regiment. He was a sergeant when received his second lieutenant's commission in 1892, and by 1893 he was a first lieutenant in Company A, 3rd Minnesota Infantry. In March 1894, several National Guard members in Duluth organized a new unit, which was accepted by the state as Company C, 3rd Minnesota Infantry, and Resche was elected commander with the rank of captain.

His unit was mobilized for the Spanish–American War in the summer of 1898, accepted for federal service as the 14th Minnesota Volunteer Infantry, and completed individual and unit training at Camp George H. Thomas, Georgia. The war ended before Resche's company departed for duty in Cuba, and they returned to Minnesota, where they were mustered out in September. Because his battalion commander was ill, Resche served several times as acting commander of the 14th Minnesota's 3rd Battalion. In October 1898, Resche commanded Company C when it was activated for American Indian Wars service during the Battle of Sugar Point at Leech Lake.

=== Later career ===
In October 1899, Resche was promoted to major and assigned to command 3rd Battalion, 3rd Minnesota Infantry. The National Guard emphasized small arms marksmanship in the late 1800s and early 1900s, and Resche took part in numerous individual and team contests. He was recognized as an expert with both rifle and pistol, and won prizes and medals at numerous competitions.

Resche was promoted to lieutenant colonel in January 1907 and assigned as second in command of the 3rd Minnesota Infantry. In late 1910, he served with his unit during the National Guard's response to a large forest fire in Lake of the Woods County, and in early 1911 he was appointed executive agent for the American Red Cross relief committee that was formed to manage rebuilding efforts. In January 1914, he was promoted to colonel and assigned to command the 3rd Minnesota Infantry. In 1916, Resche led his regiment during service near Llano Grande, Texas as part of the Pancho Villa Expedition, and in July he was promoted to brigadier general as commander of the Minnesota National Guard's 1st Brigade.

In September 1917, five months after the American entry into World War I, Resche's brigade was federalized for service in the war and redesignated the 68th Brigade, which became a unit of the 34th Division. He led the brigade during organization and training at Camp Cody, New Mexico. Before Resche's command left for combat in France the following year, a controversy arose when his German birth led to accusations that he was not sufficiently pro–American. Resche had proactively attempted to prevent accusations of disloyalty by taking no actions that could be considered anti-American, including forgoing a visit to his aged, ailing father in Germany. An investigation uncovered no wrongdoing, but Resche was still relieved of command in April 1918 for supposed inefficiency and succeeded by John Alexander Johnston. He then retired from the military and returned to Duluth. The members of his brigade demonstrated their support for Resche by cheering him as he left Camp Cody.

== Later life ==
After retiring from the military, Resche returned to his career as St. Louis County's chief probation officer. In 1925, he was approved for a federal military pension in recognition of his Spanish–American War and World War I service. He remained with the probation department until he retired in 1936. After his retirement, Resche and his wife moved to Glendale, California to reside near their daughter. In June 1946, he returned to Duluth as the guest of honor for a testimonial dinner organized by members of the company he commanded during the Spanish–American War.

Resche died in Glendale on September 3, 1946. He was buried at Forest Lawn Memorial Park in Glendale. Resche had attained the 32nd degree of the Scottish Rite, and he was buried with Masonic honors.

In 1988, a memorial to Resche was installed at Resche Place in Area 11 of Camp Ripley, Minnesota. The road was subsequently renamed as Baker Place, and Resche's memorial was moved to Camp Ripley's Court of Honor, an outdoor plaza and monument located at the Minnesota Military Museum. The Court of Honor commemorates members of the Minnesota Army National Guard who have been recognized for acts of heroism, or who have attained significant professional accomplishments while rendering distinguished military service.

== Family ==
In November 1889, Resche married Clara Simmen (1870–1962). They were the parents of a daughter, Elsbeth ("Elsie") (1890–1963), the wife of Joseph Warren Carpenter.
