= 15th Cavalry Regiment (United States) =

- 15th Cavalry Regiment coat of arms
- Active: 1901–1921; 1927–present
- Country: USA
- Branch: Regular Army
- Type: Regiment
- Role: Cavalry One Station Unit Training
- Size: Regiment
- Part of: 1st Armored Training Brigade
- Mottos: "All for One, One for All"

Commanders
- Notable commanders: William A. Shunk; William H. Hay

Insignia
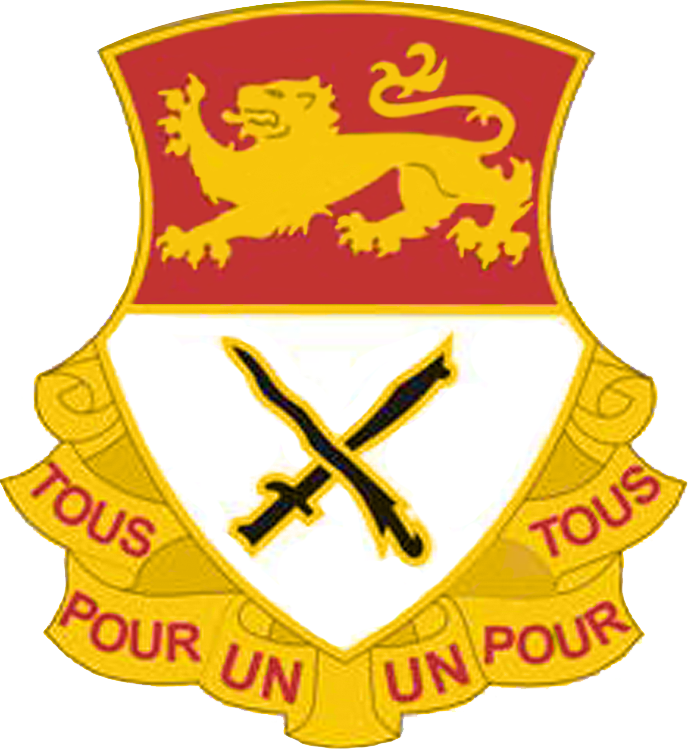
- Regimental distinctive insignia

The 15th Cavalry Regiment is a cavalry regiment of the United States Army. It was one of the Expansion Units originally established for the Spanish–American War, but has been a general workhorse unit ever since.

== History ==
=== Origins ===
The 15th Cavalry Regiment was constituted on 2 February 1901 in the Regular Army, and organized on 12 February at the Presidio of San Francisco, California. Immediately after its organization, the 15th Cavalry embarked for the Philippines to quell an insurrection in the United States' newly acquired territory. The regiment's next action was part of the Cuban Pacification from 1906 to 1909, followed by duty along the Mexican border and the hunt for revolutionary leader Pancho Villa from December 1917 to March 1918.

=== World War I ===
When the United States entered World War I, the regiment sailed for France as one of the four mounted regiments on duty with the Allied Expeditionary Force. The fighting had bogged down into trench warfare and the role of horse cavalry was nearly over. The 15th subsequently dismounted and relieved exhausted infantry units in the trenches. It was the tank that finally broke the trench lines to end both the war and signal the twilight of the horse soldier. The 15th served occupation duty after the war, and arrived at the port of New York on 19 June 1919 on the USS Panaman. It was transferred the same day to Camp Mills, New York, where emergency period personnel were discharged from the service.

=== Interwar period ===
The 15th Cavalry transferred to Fort D. A. Russell, Wyoming, and arrived there on 26 June 1919. The regiment was sent in October 1919 to quell coal miners' strikes in Sheridan, Rock Springs, and Thermopolis, Wyoming. It was inactivated on 18 October 1921 at Fort D. A. Russell. Subsequently, the 15th Cavalry's "active associate" unit that would provide the personnel to reactivate the unit in the event of war was the 13th Cavalry, 1922–25, and the 14th Cavalry, 1925–27. With the abandonment of the "active associate" concept, the 15th Cavalry was allotted to the Seventh Corps Area on 28 February 1927 and organized about June 1927 with Organized Reserve personnel from the 66th Cavalry Division as a "Regular Army Inactive" unit with headquarters at Kansas City, Missouri. The 15th Cavalry typically conducted inactive training period meetings at the 110th Engineer Regiment armory at 3620 Main Street or the Organized Reserve Center building at 20th and Vine Streets in Kansas City, and summer training with the 2nd Cavalry Regiment at Fort Riley, Kansas, from 1930 to 1940. As an alternate form of summer training, the regiment conducted cavalry Citizens Military Training Camps at Fort Leavenworth, Kansas. On 1 July 1940, the 15th Cavalry Regiment was redesignated the 15th Cavalry Regiment (Horse and Mechanized), and was given the role of a corps-level reconnaissance regiment.

=== World War II ===
With the outbreak of the Second World War, the 15th was ordered into active service on 22 March 1942 at Fort Riley, this time as a fully-mechanized unit with armored cars and tanks. After undergoing training at the Desert Training Center in California, the regiment sailed for the European Theater of Operations, arriving in Scotland in March 1944. Here, the 15th was reorganized as the 15th Cavalry Group (Mechanized). The group was composed of a group headquarters and the 15th and 17th Reconnaissance Squadrons. The 15th Cavalry Group landed on Utah Beach on 5 July 1944 as part of Patton's Third Army. The 15th served in four major campaigns in Europe: Normandy, Northern France, Rhineland, and Central Europe. The 15th Cavalry Group and its two squadrons fought as part of the Third Army, Ninth Army and was later assigned as a security force for several different divisions. The end of the war found the 15th deep inside Germany, covering over 1,000 miles of enemy held territory since landing on the Continent in July 1944. When the war ended, the 15th Cavalry Group and its two squadrons had taken nearly 7,000 German prisoners and had destroyed 78 guns and 495 enemy vehicles.

=== Postwar – the Constabulary Era ===
Following the war, the 15th was redesignated the 15th Constabulary Regiment, charged initially with occupation duty of the defeated Germany. The 17th Reconnaissance Squadron was deactivated in January 1947, but the 15th Squadron, redesignated as the 15th Constabulary Squadron, continued serving. As the cold war began in earnest, the regiment's duty shifted to patrolling the border between West Germany and East Germany, as well as the border with Czechoslovakia. The Constabulary Force guarded the border until 1952.

=== Cold War ===
From 1952 to 1987, the regiment went through a series of redesignations, inactivations and reactivations. Elements of the regiment served across various Army units in Korea, Germany, and the United States. Troop G served in the Vietnam War from 1971 to 1972, being equipped at that time with the M551 Sheridan Armored Reconnaissance/Airborne Assault Vehicle (AR/AAV).

=== Reorganization and current status ===
In March 1987, the Army overhauled its Combat Arms Regimental System (CARS) to restore some order to the history and lineage of its regiments. One goal of this reform was to keep on active duty those regiments which had earned distinguished records over long years of service. The 15th Cavalry Regiment met this criterion and, in March 1987, was reactivated at Fort Knox, Kentucky, by the activation of its 5th Squadron (Sabers). On 1 May 2018, the 2nd Squadron (Lions) was activated. Both Squadrons, as part of the 194th Armored Brigade, are charged with the mission of training the U.S. Army's enlisted Cavalry Scouts.

== Lineage ==
=== 15th Cavalry Regiment ===
- Constituted 1901-02-01 in the Regular Army as the 15th Cavalry Regiment
- Organized 1901-02-12 at the Presidio of San Francisco, California
- Assigned in December 1917 to the 15th Cavalry Division
- Relieved 1918-05-11 from assignment to the 15th Cavalry Division
- Inactivated 1921-10-18 at Fort D.A. Russell, Wyoming
- Redesignated 1942-03-22 as the 15th Cavalry Regiment, Mechanized, activated at Fort Riley, Kansas, and assigned to the Second Army.
- Regiment moved to Camp Maxey, Texas on 1943-01-23, assigned to X Corps, and participated in the Louisiana Maneuvers of 1943-06-18-1943-08-28.
- Regiment relocated to the Desert Training Center on 1943-08-20.
- Regiment Staged at Camp Shanks, New York on 1944-02-14.
- Regiment Deployed from the New York Port of Embarkation on 1944-03-01.
- Regiment arrived in England on 1944-03-07.
- Regiment broken up at Trowbridge, England, on 1944-03-12 and its elements reorganized and redesignated as follows:

Headquarters and Headquarters Troop, 15th Cavalry Group, Mechanized;
1st Squadron became 15th Cavalry Reconnaissance Squadron, Mechanized, attached to 15th Cavalry Group (Mech).
2nd Squadron became 17th Cavalry Reconnaissance Squadron, Mechanized, attached to 15th Cavalry Group (Mech).

- After 12 March 1944, the above units underwent the following changes:

==== HHT, 15th Cavalry Group, Mechanized ====
- Unit arrived in France on 1944-07-05.
- Unit entered Combat on 1944-08-02 near Avranches for the assault on Brest; remained at St. Nazaire and Lorient until relieved by the 66th Infantry Division, and performed screening missions for the Ninth Army until 1945-02-13.
- Unit attached to [XVI Corps] (United States) and crossed over into the Netherlands on 1945-02-16, and entered Germany on 1945-03-03.
- Unit located at Montabaur, Germany on 1945-08-14, which is when the Japanese agreed to surrender.
- Converted and redesignated 1946-05-01 as Headquarters and Headquarters Troop, 15th Constabulary Regiment
- Reorganized and redesignated 1948-02-02 as Headquarters and Headquarters and Service Troop, 15th Constabulary Regiment
- Inactivated 1948-12-20 in Germany
- Converted and redesignated 1950-10-23 as Headquarters and Headquarters Company, 15th Armored Cavalry Group
- Activated 1950-11-15 at Camp Polk, Louisiana
- Redesignated 1953-09-25 as Headquarters and Headquarters Company, 15th Armor Group.
- Inactivated 1955-12-01 at Fort Knox, Kentucky

==== 15th Cavalry Reconnaissance Squadron, Mechanized (less Troop E) ====
- Unit arrived in France on 1944-07-05.
- Unit crossed over into the Netherlands on 1945-02-16.
- Unit entered Germany on 1945-03-09.
- Unit was located at Verl, Germany on 1945-08-14, which is the day that Japan agreed to surrender.
- Converted and redesignated 1946-05-01 as the 15th Constabulary Squadron and assigned to the 15th Constabulary Regiment
- Inactivated 1948-12-20 in Germany and relieved from assignment to the 15th Constabulary Regiment
- Activated 1949-05-20 in Germany
- Inactivated 1952-12-15 in Germany
- Converted and redesignated 1954-08-13 as the 15th Reconnaissance Battalion

==== Troop E, 15th Cavalry Reconnaissance Squadron, Mechanized ====
- Troop E, 15th Cavalry Reconnaissance Squadron, Mechanized, converted and redesignated 1946-05-01 as the Light Tank Troop, 15th Constabulary Regiment.
- Inactivated 1947-02-28 in Germany
- Disbanded 1953-02-25
- Reconstituted 1954-08-14 in the Regular Army as Troop L, 15th Cavalry Regiment.

==== 17th Cavalry Reconnaissance Squadron, Mechanized (Less Company F) ====
- Unit arrived in France on 1944-07-15.
- Unit crossed over into the Netherlands on 1945-02-16.
- Unit entered Germany on 1944-11-23.
- Unit was located at Wiedenburck, Germany on 1945-08-14, which is the day that Japan agreed to surrender.
- 17th Cavalry Reconnaissance Squadron, Mechanized, inactivated 1947-01-20 in Germany
- Redesignated (less Company F) 1948-09-01 as the 501st Reconnaissance Battalion
- Activated 1948-09-25 at Fort Sill, Oklahoma
- Inactivated 1949-01-25 at Fort Sill, Oklahoma

Portions of the 17th's movements are dramatized in the book, "Teacher of the Year: The Mystery and Legacy of Edwin Barlow".

==== Company F, 17th Cavalry Reconnaissance Squadron, Mechanized ====
- Redesignated 1948-09-01 as the 550th Light Tank Company
- Redesignated 1951-03-19 as the 550th Tank Company
- Activated 1951-04-06 at Fort Benning, Georgia
- Inactivated 1958-06-25 at Fort Campbell, Kentucky
- Redesignated 1958-10-01 as Troop F, 15th Cavalry Regiment

=== Consolidation ===
- HHC, 15th Armor Group; 15th and 501st Reconnaissance Battalions; and Troops F and L, 15th Cavalry Regiment, consolidated, reorganized and redesignated 1957-04-01 to 1959-05-01 as the 15th Cavalry Regiment, a parent regiment under the Combat Arms Regimental System
- Redesignated 1963-07-01 as the 15th Armor Regiment
- Redesignated 1967-07-01 as the 15th Cavalry Regiment
- Troop G, 15th Cavalry Regiment arrived in Vietnam on 1971-12-15. For this security assignment, Troop G was equipped with M-551 Sheridan Assault Vehicles in place of their normal Tracked Vehicles.
- Troop G returned from Vietnam on 1972-02-26.
- Withdrawn 1987-03-25 from the Combat Arms Regimental System, reorganized under the United States Army Regimental System, and transferred to the United States Army Training and Doctrine Command.
- 2nd Squadron was activated on 1 May 2018 at Fort Benning, Georgia.

== Honors ==
=== Campaign participation credit ===
- Philippine Insurrection:
1. Mindanao;
2. Luzon 1902
- World War I:
1. Streamer without inscription
- World War II:
1. Normandy;
2. Northern France;
3. Rhineland;
4. Central Europe
- Vietnam:
1. Consolidation II (Troop G only).

=== Decorations ===
- None

=== Commanding officers ===
- Colonels of the Regiment (Commanding Officers of the 15th Cavalry Regiment, 1901–55)
- 1st COL William M. Wallace March 1901 – October 1906
- 2nd COL George F. Chase October 1906 – May 1907
- 3rd COL Joseph Garrard May 1907 – April 1914
- 4th COL George H. Morgan April 1914 – July 1915
- 5th COL William A. Shunk July 1915 – October 1916
- 6th COL William H. Hay October 1916 – October 1917
- 7th COL Melvin W. Rowell October 1917 – May 1918
- 8th COL Herman A. Sievert May 1918 – July 1919
- 9th COL Mortimer A. Bigelow July 1919 – August 1919
- 10th COL Michael M. McNamee August 1919 – October 1919
- 11th COL Charles A. Hedekin October 1919 – February 1920
- 12th COL Michael M. McNamee February 1920 – April 1920
- 13th COL Thomas B. Dugan April 1920 – September 1921
- 14th COL Roy B. Harper September 1921 – October 1921

(Inactivated October 1921, reactivated March 1942)

- 15th COL J. Frank Richmond March 1942 – November 1942
- 16th COL John B. Reybold November 1942 – August 1944

(Redesignated March 1944 as 15th Cavalry Group, Mechanized)

- 17th LTC Robert J. Quinn August 1944 – June 1945
- 18th COL David Wagstaff June 1945 – April 1946

(Redesignated May 1946 as 15th Constabulary Regiment)

- 19th COL Harold G. Holt April 1946 – July 1947
- 20th COL William H. Hill September 1947 – July 1948
- 21st LTC Evert S. Thomas July 1948 – December 1948

(Inactivated December 1948, reactivated November 1950 as 15th Armored Cavalry Group, Mechanized)

- 22nd COL Alan L. Fulton November 1950 – November 1952
- 23rd LTC Wilbur Stephenson November 1952 – July 1955

(Redesignated September 1953 as 15th Armor Group)

- 24th LTC Delbert Tanner July 1955 – December 1955

(15th Armor Group Inactivated December 1955, incorporated into the Combat Arms Regimental System 1957, regimental headquarters disbanded.)
