= Albert Leopold Mills =

United States Army general

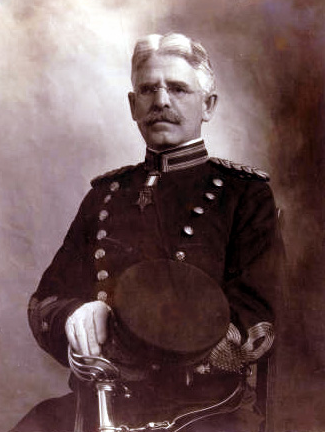
- Born: May 7, 1854; Manhattan, New York, US
- Died: September 18, 1916 (aged 62); Washington, D.C., US
- Burial place: West Point Cemetery
- Spouse: Alada Thurston Paddock (m. 1883)
- Military career
- Allegiance: United States of America
- Branch: United States Army
- Service years: 1879–1916
- Rank: Major general
- Commands: Superintendent of the United States Military Academy; President of the Army War College; Chief of the Militia Bureau
- Conflicts: Spanish–American War: Battle of San Juan Hill
- Awards: Medal of Honor

Albert Leopold Mills (May 7, 1854 – September 18, 1916) was a United States Army major general who was a recipient of the Medal of Honor for valor in action on July 1, 1898, near Santiago, Cuba. An 1879 graduate of West Point, he served in the Army until his death in 1916. Following his service in Cuba, he was appointed superintendent of West Point, jumping in rank from first lieutenant to colonel. His final posting was as the chief of the Division of Militia Affairs, a precursor to the National Guard Bureau.

== Early life and Spanish–American War ==
Albert L. Mills was born in New York City. He was appointed to West Point, graduating with the class of 1879. He joined the 1st United States Cavalry after graduation, serving on the American frontier, alternating between being a cavalry instructor and participating in the conflicts with the Plains Indians. In 1886, he was posted as an instructor at the Citadel. Mills receive a promotion to first lieutenant in 1889.

After the Spanish–American War began in 1898, he was promoted to a captain of volunteers, and served as assistant adjutant general of the 2nd Cavalry Brigade. He received the Medal of Honor for his bravery at the Battle of San Juan Hill near Santiago, Cuba, on July 1, 1898. Though shot through the head, and temporarily blinded, he continued to command his men. He was absent from duty until August 1898 while recovering from the effects of his wounds.

== Medal of Honor citation ==
"Distinguished gallantry in encouraging those near him by his bravery and coolness after being shot through the head and entirely without sight."

== Postbellum ==
After recovering from his wounds and returning to duty, President William McKinley appointed him as the superintendent at West Point, a posting that advanced him from his Regular Army rank of first lieutenant to the rank of colonel. He served as superintendent until August 1906, receiving a promotion to brigadier general in January 1904. During his long term at West Point, he initiated numerous changes, including suppression of hazing, and the expansion of the size of the academy. After the academy, he served in the Philippines and as president of the Army War College at the Washington Barracks. He later served as chief of the Division of Militia Affairs from 1912 to 1916, being promoted to major general in July of the latter year. General Mills was struck ill and died suddenly while serving as chief of the Militia Bureau, on September 18, 1916. Mills is buried at the West Point Cemetery at the United States Military Academy.

== Personal life ==
Mills married Ms. Alada Thurston Paddock of Brooklyn, New York on November 15, 1883. They had two children, army officer Chester P. Mills and Gertrude W. Mills, the wife of army officer Emil P. Laurson. In 1925, Alada Paddock Mills married Brigadier General Samuel W. Miller, who had been a West Point classmate of Albert Mills.

== See also ==
- List of Medal of Honor recipients

Military offices
Preceded by Oswald Herbert Ernst	Superintendents of the United States Military Academy; 1898–1906	Succeeded by Hugh L. Scott
Preceded by Robert K. Evans	Chief of the National Guard Bureau; 1912 –- 1916	Succeeded by George W. McIver (Acting)
