= John Skinner Mallory =

American military officer (1857–1932)

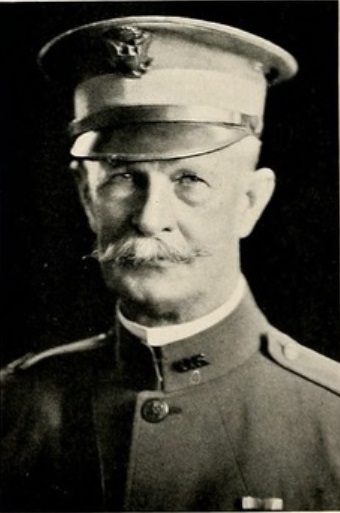
- From The Bomb, the Virginia Military Institute yearbook for 1922.
- Born: November 1, 1857; Hampton, Virginia, U.S.
- Died: February 2, 1932 (aged 74); Lexington, Virginia
- Burial place: Saint Johns Church Cemetery, Hampton, Virginia
- Military career
- Allegiance: United States
- Branch: United States Army
- Service years: 1879–1918
- Rank: Brigadier General
- Service number: 0-8648
- Unit: Infantry Branch
- Commands: 29th Regiment; 153rd Depot Brigade; 78th Division; 7th Brigade; 155th Depot Brigade
- Conflicts: Ghost Dance War; Spanish–American War; Philippine–American War; World War I
- Awards: Silver Star
- Other work: Lecturer, Virginia Military Institute

Brigadier General John Skinner Mallory (1 November 1857 – 2 February 1932) was a United States Army officer who saw active service in numerous conflicts throughout his military career, including World War I. He is also known for writing the Small Arms Firing Manual.

== Early years ==
Mallory was born near Hampton, Virginia on 1 November 1857, the son of Charles King Mallory, formerly a colonel in the Confederate Army and Martha Skinner Mallory. He was educated in private schools in Hampton and Norfolk, Mallory went on to attend the U.S. Military Academy, from which he graduated in 1879.

== Military career ==
Following his graduation in 1879, Mallory was commissioned into the 20th Infantry Regiment, performing frontier duty from 1879 to 1883. Following a period of twenty years of service with the regiment, Mallory was appointed acting chief commissary for General Nelson Miles during the Ghost Dance War from 1890 to 1891.

In 1893, Mallory authored the Small Arms Firing Manual, which became the official manual for the services, with frequent revisions throughout the following years.

Mallory saw brief service in the Spanish–American War and the ensuing Philippine insurrection. During the Spanish–American War, Mallory was deployed to the Philippines under General Otis in 1898. He remained in the Philippines after the Spanish defeat to take part in the Philippine–American War under General Arthur MacArthur. For his service in the Philippines, Mallory received two Silver Star commendations.

In 1900, Mallory was appointed military attaché in China, the position he would hold until the following year. After returning to the United States, Mallory served with the 1st and 12th Infantry regiments before serving on the War Department General Staff from 1903 to 1906.

In 1909, Mallory was deployed once more to the Philippines, this time with the 11th Regiment until May 1910, when he returned to the U.S. and was stationed at Fort D.A. Russel, Wyoming. The following year, he was appointed inspector-general for the Department of Texas from January to March 1911, after which he attended and graduated from the Army War College. In 1912, he received his promotion to colonel and was given command of the 29th Regiment at Fort Jay, New York. In 1915, Mallory and the 29th was stationed at Camp Gaillard near the Panama Canal, with a brief interlude in 1916 during which Mallory was stationed at Headquarters Eastern Department on Governor's Island, NY.

In August 1917, four months after the American entry into World War I, Mallory took command of the 153rd Depot Brigade at Fort Dix, New Jersey, before temporarily assuming command of the 78th Division and Fort Dix. In early 1918, Mallory was promoted to brigadier general as commander of the 7th Infantry Brigade, part of the newly activated 4th Division. He failed his physical examination in April, before the brigade left for combat in France, and was succeeded by Brigadier General Benjamin A. Poore.

Mallory reverted to the rank of colonel and commanded the 155th Depot Brigade, Camp Lee and Camp Upton. The Armistice of November 11, 1918 ended the war, and Mallory formally retired on 30 December 1918.

== Civilian life ==
Following his retirement from the military, Mallory taught Spanish at the Virginia Military Institute for two years. He was an active member of the Robert E. Lee Memorial Episcopal Church, today the Grace Episcopal Church, in Lexington, Virginia.

== Personal life and death ==
John Skinner Mallory married Sarah Reed in 1886. They had three children: Henry Reed Mallory, Conn Mallory and John Stevenson Mallory, the latter a U.S. Military Academy graduate. Mallory died in Lexington, Virginia on 2 February 1932. He is buried at the Saint Johns Church Cemetery, in Hampton, Virginia.

== Bibliography ==
- Cooke, James J. The U.S. Air Service in the Great War, 1917–1919, (Westport, CT: Praeger Publishers, 1996) ISBN 0275948625

Military offices
Preceded by Chase W. Kennedy	Commanding General 78th Division; November–December 1917	Succeeded by James T. Dean
