= James Anderson Irons =

United States Army brigadier general

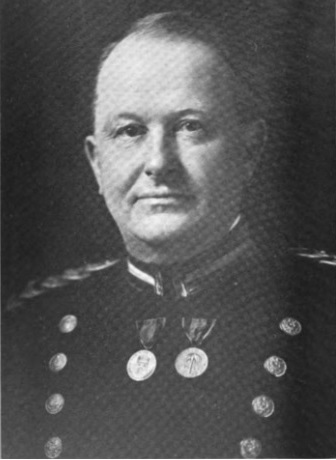
- From 1922's Fifty-Third Annual Report of the Association of Graduates of the United States Military Academy
- Born: February 21, 1857; Philadelphia, Pennsylvania
- Died: July 20, 1921 (aged 64); Sant'Agnello di Sorrento, Italy
- Spouse: Florence Farrell (m. 1888-1921, his death)
- Military career
- Allegiance: United States
- Branch: United States Army
- Service years: 1879–1920
- Rank: Brigadier General
- Conflicts: Spanish–American War Battle of El Caney Battle of San Juan Hill Siege of Santiago Philippine–American War; World War I

James Anderson Irons (February 21, 1857 – July 20, 1921) was a brigadier general during World War I.

== Early life and education ==
Irons was born in Philadelphia, Pennsylvania on February 21, 1857, the son of James R. Irons and Sarah (Anderson) Irons. He attended the public schools of Philadelphia and was an 1875 graduate of Central High School.

After high school, Irons began attendance at the United States Military Academy. He graduated in 1879 ranked 49th of 67.

== Military career ==
After graduation from West Point, he was commissioned as a second lieutenant and assigned to the 20th Infantry at Fort Brown, Texas. He performed frontier duty from 1879 to 1883.

He graduated from the Infantry and Cavalry School at Fort Leavenworth, Kansas, in 1885. This was followed by more frontier duty until 1887.

During the Spanish–American War, he participated in the Battle of El Caney, Battle of San Juan Hill, and the Siege of Santiago.

In 1899, he sailed with his regiment to the Philippines.

From 1901 to 1902, he was inspector general of the Department of Colorado.

From 1903 to 1905, he served on the General Staff.

From 1907 to 1910, he served as the military attache to Tokyo.

From 1914 to 1917, he had a tour of duty in China. In 1917, he returned to Tokyo and was military attache to the Imperial Japanese War Mission.

He was promoted to brigadier general with the National Army on August 5, 1917. He commanded the 166th Depot Brigade at Camp Lewis, Washington.

In December 1917, he commanded the 5th Infantry Brigade, camp Greene, North Carolina.

In February and March 1918, he commanded the Third Infantry Division.

Irons retired as a colonel in 1920.

== Awards ==
For his service in Japan, Irons was awarded that country's Order of the Rising Sun (Third Class). After his death, Irons was officially cited twice for heroism, once for gallantry while fighting at El Caney on July 1, 1898, and once for bravery while fighting Filipino insurgents in Cainta on March 16, 1899.

In 1930, the U.S. Congress passed legislation allowing World War I general officers to retire at the highest rank they had held. This law included a provision for officers who had died since the war, and Irons' rank of brigadier general was posthumously restored.

== Personal life ==
Irons married Florence Farrell on June 7, 1888. Florence Farrell's sister Frances was the wife of Brigadier General George Henson Estes.

== Death and legacy ==
Irons died on July 20, 1921, in Sant'Agnello di Sorrento, Italy.
