= Henry Alexander Greene =

United States Army general

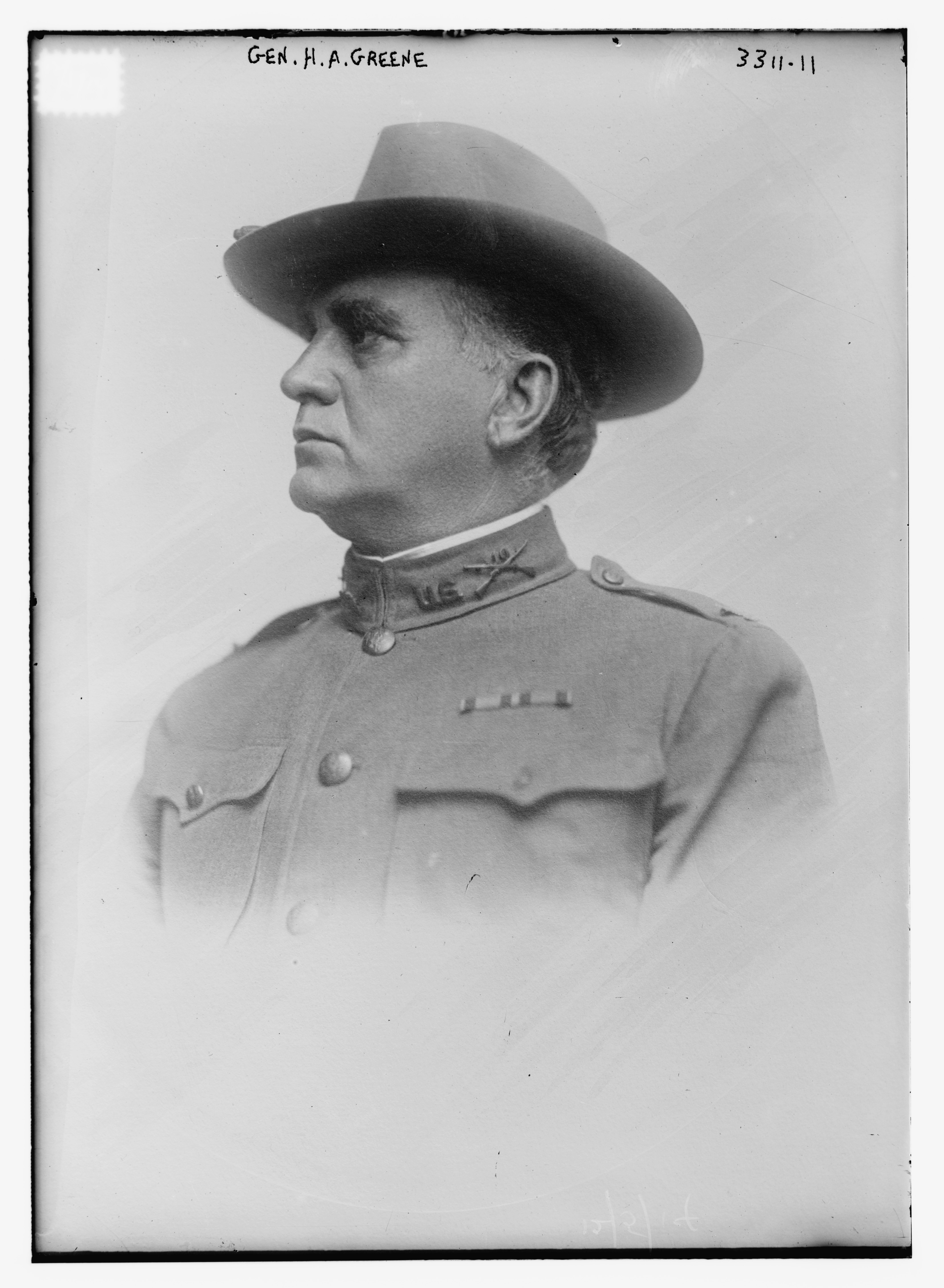
- Born: August 6, 1856; Matteawan, New York
- Died: August 19, 1921 (aged 65); California
- Spouse: Augusta B. Barlow
- Military career
- Allegiance: United States
- Branch: United States Army
- Service years: 1879–1918
- Rank: Major General
- Conflicts: Spanish–American War; Philippine–American War; World War I

Henry Alexander Greene (August 5, 1856 – August 19, 1921) was a United States Army officer in the late 19th and early 20th centuries. He served in several conflicts, including World War I.

== Biography ==
Greene was born on August 5, 1856, in Matteawan, New York. He graduated from the United States Military Academy in 1879.

Greene was commissioned into the 20th Infantry Regiment. He did frontier duty from 1879 to 1894, serving in Texas and Montana, and he commanded a company of Sioux scouts for three years. Greene served in Cuba during the Spanish–American War, in the Siege of Santiago, and in the Philippines during the Philippine–American War, commanding a company of infantry in both conflicts. He also served as an aide to Elwell Stephen Otis. Green served on the board of the United States Army War College from 1903 to 1904, and he also served as a secretary to the General Staff from August 15, 1903, to June 30, 1904. He served as the Chief of Staff of the Southwest Division from 1904 to 1905, and of the Northern Division from 1905 to 1907. Greene commanded the 10th Infantry Regiment in Alaska from 1907 to 1908 before being stationed at Fort Benjamin Harrison from 1908 to 1911. He served concurrently as the president of the Infantry Equipment Board at the Rock Island Arsenal. He held other positions and served in some other locations during this time.

Greene was promoted to the rank of brigadier general in 1914. He served as the commandant of the United States Army Command and General Staff College from September 1914 to August 1916. Greene was promoted to major general on August 5, 1917. He commanded the 91st Division from August 26 to November 24, 1917, and again from March 3 to June 1918.

Greene retired on November 29, 1918, and he lived in Berkeley, California. He died on August 19, 1921. Congress restored his rank of major general in June 1930.

== Personal life ==
Greene married his wife, Augusta B. Barlow, on December 21, 1881. He was an Episcopalian and a mason.
