= John Alexander Johnston =

United States Army general and politician (1858–1940)

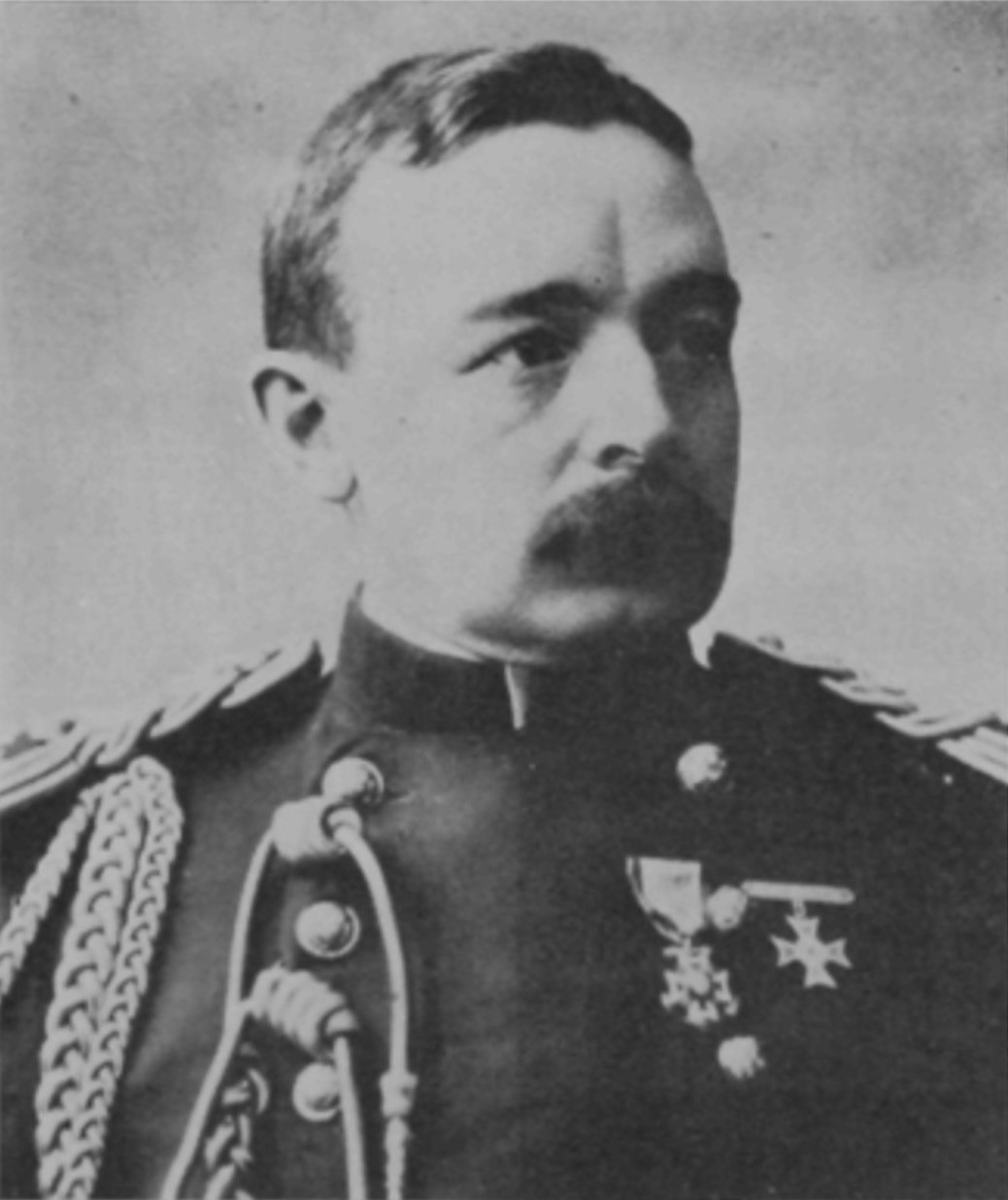

Member of the Board of Commissioners of Washington, D.C.
- In office January 24, 1910 – July 19, 1913
- President: William Howard Taft
- Preceded by: Henry Litchfield West
- Succeeded by: Oliver Peck Newman

Personal details
- Born: February 22, 1858 Allegheny, Pennsylvania, U.S.
- Died: January 5, 1940 (aged 81)
- Resting place: Arlington National Cemetery
- Party: Democratic
- Spouse(s): Henrietta Vandergrift (1888–1930); Zella McCallister (1932–1936)
- Education: United States Military Academy
- Occupation: Military officer
- Civilian awards: Commander Legion of Honor

Military service
- Allegiance: United States
- Branch/service: United States Army
- Years of service: 1879–1903, 1917–1919
- Rank: Brigadier General
- Commands: 153rd Depot Brigade; 34th Division; 68th Brigade; Northeast Department
- Battles/wars: World War I
- Military awards: Distinguished Service Medal

John Alexander Johnston (22 February 1858 – 5 January 1940) was an American military officer and commissioner of the District of Columbia born in Allegheny, Pennsylvania. He served as a brigadier general during World War I.

== Early life ==
Johnston was born in Allegheny, Pennsylvania on February 22, 1858, the son of Alexander and Sarah R. Johnston.

== Military career ==
Johnston graduated from the United States Military Academy in 1879, graduating twenty-third out of sixty seven. He was commissioned into the cavalry and performed frontier duty in Texas from 1879 to 1882. In 1883, he was an honor graduate from the Infantry and Cavalry School at Fort Leavenworth, Kansas, after which he became an instructor there, instructing on the art of war and engineering until 1885.

In 1886, Johnston was promoted to first lieutenant and would alternate between frontier duty in South Dakota multiple times, from 1886 to 1887, 1891–93 and 1895–97. Between his tours of frontier duty in South Dakota, Johnston taught history, law and tactics at the U.S. Military Academy from 1887 to 1891, and horsemanship at the Jefferson Barracks Cavalry Depot, Missouri, from 1893 to 1895. Johnston would spend the remainder of his career in the Adjutant General's Department in Washington, D.C., mustering in and out all the volunteers of the Spanish–American War and the Philippine Insurrection, being promoted to lieutenant colonel on February 21, 1901, and brigadier general on January 7, 1903, and ultimately resigning a week later on January 15, 1903. Johnston would remain in Washington D.C. after his resignation, working as a commissioner for the District of Columbia from 1910 to 1913.

On August 5, 1917, Johnston was recommissioned as a brigadier general and placed in command of the Northeastern Department in Boston. In June 1918, he succeeded Frederick Emil Resche as commander of the 68th Infantry Brigade, a unit of the 34th Division. In October 1918, he was assigned to command the division, and he received the Army Distinguished Service Medal at the end of the war. The citation for the medal reads:

The President of the United States of America, authorized by Act of Congress, July 9, 1918, takes pleasure in presenting the Army Distinguished Service Medal to Brigadier General John Alexander Johnston, United States Army, for exceptionally meritorious and distinguished services to the Government of the United States, in a duty of great responsibility during World War I. As Department Commander, Northeastern Department, between 11 September 1917 and 23 May 1918, General Johnston handled many difficult problems arising in that department with rare judgment, tact, and great skill. Later, as Commanding General of the 34th Division, which he took overseas, his marked efficiency, unusual initiative, and military attainments of a high order were important factors in the excellent standard of training attained by the Division.

Returning to the United States, Johnston commanded the 153rd Depot Brigade at Camp Dix, New Jersey from January to February 1919, when he was relieved of active duty.

== Personal life ==
Johnston married Henrietta Vargelia (Vandergrift) Loomis (1862–1930) in 1888. Her first husband had died in 1883 and she had a young daughter. After his first wife's death, he married divorcée Zella (McAllister) Barnes (1877–1936) in 1932.

== Death and legacy ==
Johnston died on January 5, 1940, at the Mount Alto Veterans Hospital in Washington, D.C., from a heart ailment at the age of 81. He is buried in Arlington National Cemetery.
