= Multi-National Security Transition Command – Iraq =

U.S. Military command in Iraq

Multi-National Security Transition Command – Iraq (MNSTC-I) was a training and organizational-support command of the United States Department of Defense. It was established in June 2004. It was a military formation of Multi-National Force – Iraq responsible for developing, organizing, training, equipping, and sustaining the Iraqi Ministry of Defense (MoD), with the Iraqi Armed Forces, including the Iraqi Counter Terrorism Service; and the Ministry of Interior (Iraq) with the Iraqi Police and Border Enforcement, Facilities Protection, and other forces. It was headquartered in the International Zone (Green Zone) in Baghdad at Phoenix Base, a former elementary school.

The Office of Security Cooperation, which existed for only three months, was replaced by the Office of Security Transition (OST). General Petraeus first took command of the Office of Security Transition; its deputy commander was Brigadier Nigel Aylwin-Foster of the British Army. The OST, whose lifespan was a mere month, was effectively only a name change for the Office of Security Cooperation. The OST was replaced by MNSTC-I.

MNSTC-I's mission was to assist the Defense and Interior Ministries by improving Iraqi quality and institutional performance. MNSTC-I aimed for the ISF to increasingly assume responsibility for population protection and develop Iraqi security institutions capable of sustaining security with reduced Coalition involvement. Therefore, the MNSTC-I mission was a central part of the U.S. exit strategy.

Among the advisors sent were large numbers of both Army National Guard, including both line battalions and Special Forces, and United States Army Reserve, including significant elements of the 98th Division. Owen West's book The Snake Eaters includes open complaints about the quality of advisors; there was a perception that mentoring teams were staffed with "leftovers." Advisors did not arrive prepared: their knowledge of Iraqi culture and Islam was "literally power point deep."

== Creation and organization ==
The command was a direct outgrowth of the need to create a new Iraqi Army under the Coalition Provisional Authority. To do this the Coalition Military Assistance Training Team (CMATT) was established under Major General Paul Eaton. Separate efforts under the State Department were designed to build a new police force through the [Civilian Police Assistance Team] and advisory missions to the Ministries of Defense and Interior. All of these missions were consolidated under the new command MNSTC-I.

MNSTC-I was originally organized into three training teams, listed below, but later grew dramatically as newer missions and needs were identified. The three former organizations were:

- Coalition Military Assistance Training Team, which organized, trained, and equipped the Iraqi Army.
- JHQ-ST – Joint Headquarters Advisory Support Team, which assisted the joint headquarters of the Iraqi Army in developing a command and control system. Also, JHQ assisted in operational planning and gave strategic advice to the Iraqi government.
- Civilian Police Assistance Training Team (CPATT), which organized, trained, and equipped the Iraqi Police.

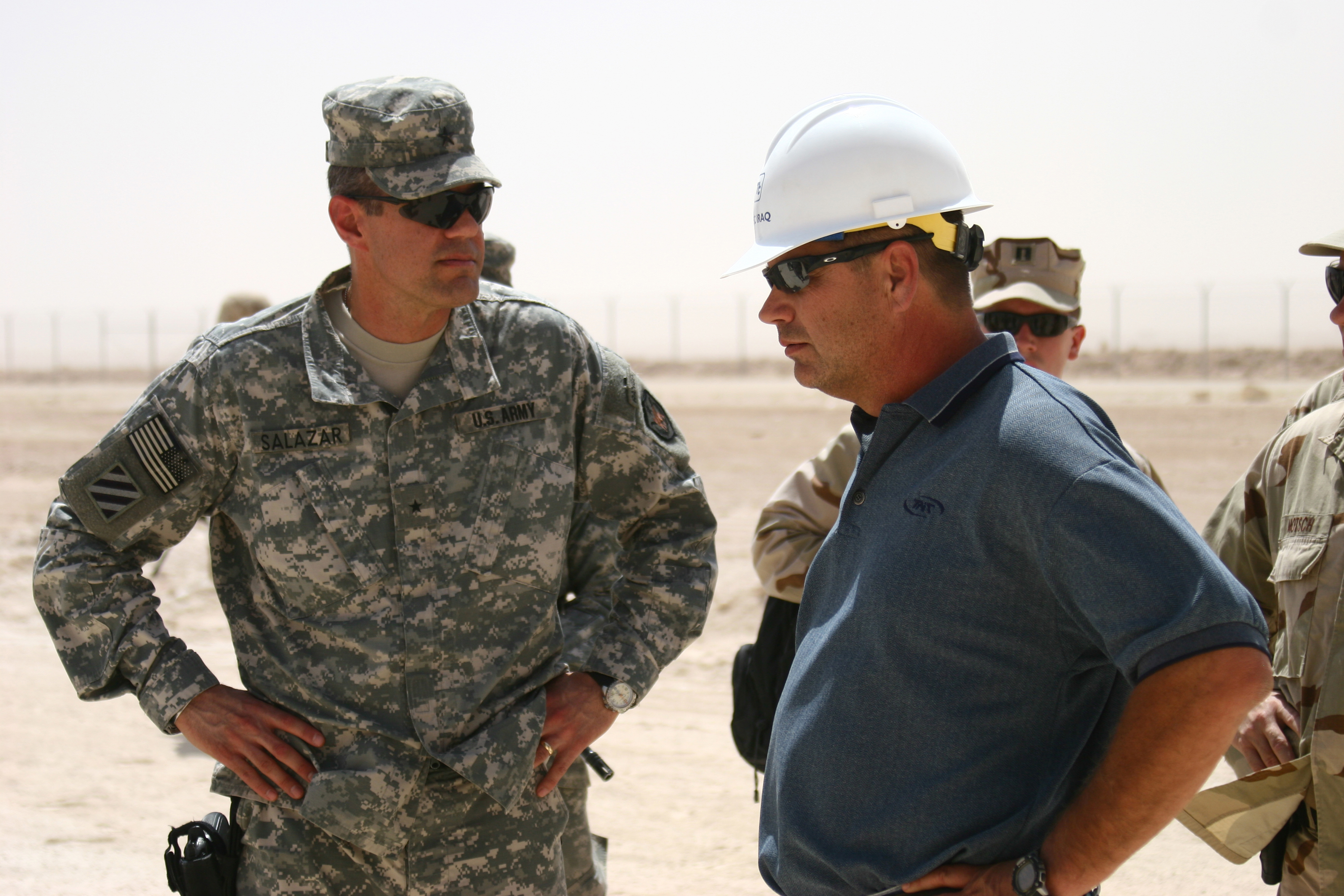
Brigadier Gen. Steve Salazar, deputy commanding general of the Coalition Army Advisory Training Team, and other representatives from the team, visited a training site of the Iraqi 7th Division near Al Asad Air Base, Anbar Province, July 20, 2008. Once finished, the facility was planned to have enough equipment to train more than 300 Iraqi soldiers.

MNSTC-I expanded from the three original organizations to consists of the following subordinate units organized under the Directorate of Defense Affairs and Directorate of Interior Affairs:

- Coalition Army Advisory Training Team (CAATT) to build the Iraqi Army
- Coalition Air Force Transition Team (CAFTT) to build the Iraqi Air Force, established 18 November 2005. The CAFTT at its beginning had some 17 members, a four-fold increase over the original CMATT Air Cell. This mission later involved the 370th Air Expeditionary Advisory Group.
- Maritime Strategic Transition Team (MaSTT) to support the Iraqi Navy, Marines and Coast Guard
- Civilian Police Assistance Training Team (CPATT) building the various Iraqi police agencies
- Intelligence Transition Team (ITT) to build the military and police information organizations
- Iraqi National Counter-Terrorism Task Force (INCTF) to assist Iraqi special operations (probably including the Iraqi National Counter-Terrorism Force)
- Security Assistance Office (SAO) to assist in the purchase of equipment and overseas training
- Joint Headquarters Assistance Team (JHQ-AT) to advise the Iraqi Joint Headquarters
- Ministry of Defense Transition Team (MOD-TT) to advise the MoD staff
- Ministry of Interior Transition Team (MOI-TT) to advise the MoI staff

In addition, the organization partnered with the NATO Training Mission – Iraq (NTM-I) as the commander of MNSTC-I was "dual hatted" as the NTM-I commander as well.

== Reorganization 2009 ==
In June 2009, the organization structure changed again with the creation of the Iraqi Training and Advisory Mission (ITAM) led by US Army Major General Richard J. Rowe, Jr, the Iraqi Security Assistance Mission (ISAM), and the Partnership Strategy Group (PSG-I). ITAM and ISAM, INCTF and PSG-I report to the Deputy Commanding General. ITAM was focused on institutional training while ISAM focused on Foreign Military Sales. Under the new ITAM structure:

- Coalition Army Advisory Training Team (CAATT) became ITAM-Army
- Coalition Air Force Transition Team (CAFTT) became ITAM-Air Force
- Maritime Strategic Transition Team (MaSTT) became ITAM-Navy
- Civilian Police Assistance Training Team (CPATT) became ITAM-Police
- Intelligence Transition Team (ITT) became ITAM-Intel TT
- Ministry of Defense Transition Team (MOD-TT) became ITAM-MOD
- Ministry of Interior Transition Team (MOI-TT) became ITAM-MOI

Under the new PSG-I structure the Joint Headquarters Assistance Team (JHQ-AT) was absorbed into the PSG-I organization.

ISAM: The organizations under ISAM mirror ITAM, though it took over the duties of the Security Assistance Office (SAO).

- ISAM Army
- ISAM Navy
- ISAM Air Force
- ISAM Logistics/End Use Monitoring (LOG/EUM)
- ISAM International Military Education and Training/Out of Country Training (IMET/OCT)

MNSTC-I published a monthly magazine, The Advisor, with information on the training of the Iraqi Security Forces.

MNSTC-I was replaced by United States Forces – Iraq in 2010. MNSTC–I became U.S. Forces – Iraq, Advising and Training, which was under a major general who remained double-hatted as Commander, NATO Training Mission – Iraq.

Kalinovsky cites Visser and argues the U.S. training mission was "delegitimizing."

=== ITAM-Air ===
The 321st Air Expeditionary Wing was reactivated in 2008 to assume the mission of Iraq Training and Advisory Mission (ITAM)-Air Force. Under the ITAM-Air Force mission, the 321st Air Expeditionary Wing trained, advised, and assisted the Iraqi Air Force to develop as a professional and credible regional airpower partner, with the foundational and enduring capabilities to maintain internal security and defend against external threats; provide aerial port, airfield operations, base and medical support, and command and control in support of United States Forces - Iraq (USF-I). It was to transition designated missions, organizations and functions to other U.S. Government agencies no later than 31 December 2011.

On the evening of 31 August 2010, a C-130 crew completed the last mission of a U.S. aircraft in support of Operation Iraqi Freedom (OIF) as they departed from Ali Al Salem Air Base, Kuwait, for Sather Air Base, Baghdad International Airport, Iraq. That same aircrew flew back to Kuwait, refueled, and then returned to Sather AB on 1 September to complete the first sortie of an American aircraft in support of Operation New Dawn. Under Operation New Dawn, American combat forces redeployed from the country, and the focus for the remaining U.S. Forces-Iraq shifted to train, mentor, advise and assist the armed forces of Iraq in preparation for the exit of U.S. military forces from Iraq in December 2011.

Operation New Dawn brought little change to the 321st AEW and ITAM-Air Force, who continued their mission to train, mentor, advise and assist the Iraqi Air Force to develop into a professional and credible regional airpower partner. When the Iraqi Ministry of Defense made the decision to split fixed-wing and rotary-wing operations in late 2010, the Iraqi Army Aviation Command (IAAC) was created. Because U.S. Airmen continued to advise for both the Iraqi Air Force and the IAAC, the name was changed from ITAM-Air Force to ITAM-Air and addressed the fully comprehensive scope of training.

The wing and ITAM-Air encouraged the development of Iraqi airpower to maintain internal security and defend against external threats. At the same time, the 321st provided aerial port, airfield operations, base and medical support, in addition to command and control capabilities to support USF-I. The wing and ITAM-Air also prepared to transition designated missions and functions to other U.S. government agencies and the Iraqi Air Force no later than December 2011.

The 321st consists of four groups, geographically separated from wing headquarters; the 321st Air Expeditionary Advisory Group headquartered at Kirkuk Air Base, the 321st Expeditionary Mission Support Advisory Group with headquarters at Tikrit, the 407th Air Expeditionary Group at Ali Air Base and the 447th Air Expeditionary Group at Sather Air Base.

At the beginning of October 2010, the commanding general of USF-I issued his operational guidance for the entire command following the completion under the first month of Operation New Dawn. The general stressed that "we will demonstrate our commitment through a continued partnership with the Iraqis. We will help the Iraqis develop their capability to provide for their own national defense."

In April 2010, the 407th Group at Ali Air Base and the 447th Group at Sather Air Base realigned for drawdown operations leading up to Operation New Dawn.

On 6 January 2011, Brigadier General Anthony J. Rock, who most recently served as Air Command and Staff College commandant and Spaatz Center for Officer Education vice commander, assumed command of the 321st Wing and ITAM-Air. The general urged those under his command to finish strong as the 31 December 2011, deadline established under the 2008 U.S.-Iraq Status of Forces Agreement quickly approaches.

== Commanders ==
External image
- Page shows command crest

- Lieutenant General David H. Petraeus - assumed command of Office of Security Transition, June 4, 2004
- Lieutenant General David H. Petraeus - MNSTC-I stands up, June 28, 2004 - September 2005
- Lieutenant General Martin E. Dempsey (September 2005 – June 2007)
- Lieutenant General James M. Dubik (June 2007 – July 2008)
- Lieutenant General Frank Helmick (July 2008 – October 2009)
- Lieutenant General Michael D. Barbero (October 2009 - January 2011)

Michael Ferriter was the successor Deputy Commander, Advising and Training, United States Forces - Iraq, from January to October 2011.
