= Battle of Musa Qala =

2007 British-led military action in Helmand Province, southern Afghanistan

- Part of the War in Afghanistan (2001–2021)
Date	7–12 December 2007
Location	Musa Qala, Helmand province, Afghanistan 32.444°N 64.744°E
Result	Coalition Victory

Belligerents
ISAF: United Kingdom; United States; Denmark; Estonia; Afghanistan	Taliban

Commanders and leaders
(United Kingdom) Andrew Mackay (Islamic Republic of Afghanistan) Mahayadin Ghori	Abdul-Mannan Abdul-Rahim; Abdul-Matin Akhund; Abdul-Bari Akhund

Strength
4,500 ISAF and Afghan National Army forces	Per Taliban; 2,000 insurgents Per ISAF; 300 insurgents (ISAF claim)

Casualties and losses
(United States) 1 killed, 7 wounded (United Kingdom) 1 killed, 2 wounded	Per ISAF Claim: Less than 100 total Per Afghan Defence Ministry Claim; Hundreds killed, wounded and detained
- 2–40 civilians killed.

The Battle of Musa Qala (also Qaleh or Qal'eh) was a British-led military action in Helmand Province, southern Afghanistan, launched by the Afghan National Army and the International Security Assistance Force (ISAF) against the Taliban on 7 December 2007. After three days of intense fighting, the Taliban retreated into the mountains on 10 December. Musa Qala was officially reported captured on 12 December, with Afghan Army troops pushing into the town centre.

The operation was codenamed snakepit (Pashto: Mar Kardad). Senior ISAF officers, including U.S. general Dan K. McNeill, the overall ISAF commander, agreed to the assault on 17 November 2007. It followed more than nine months of Taliban occupation of the town, the largest the insurgents controlled at the time of the battle. ISAF forces had previously occupied the town, until a controversial withdrawal in late 2006.

It was the first battle in the War in Afghanistan in which Afghan army units were the principal fighting force. Statements from the British Ministry of Defence (MOD) emphasised that the operation was Afghan-led, although the ability of Afghan units to function without NATO control was questioned during the battle. Military engagement over Musa Qala is part of a wider conflict between coalition forces and the Taliban in Helmand. Both before and after the battle, related fighting was reported across a larger area, particularly in Sangin district to the south of Musa Qala.

== Background ==
Musa Qala is a town of around 15,000 to 20,000 people, with another 25,000 in the surrounding area. ISAF forces were first deployed in the town in mid-June 2006, as part of the "platoon house" strategy. This consisted of protecting the district centres of Northern Helmand with small detachments of British ISAF troops, at the request of the provincial governor Mohammed Daoud. This move met with an unexpectedly fierce resistance from the Taliban and local tribesmen, who used conventional, rather than asymmetric tactics, to drive the coalition from their positions. The isolated British garrison found itself under siege and constant attack for long periods, and their replacements could only be brought in after a full battle group operation, codenamed Snakebite, broke through Taliban lines in early August.

The fighting ended in October 2006 when, in a controversial move, control was ceded to local tribal elders. The deal was intended to see neither British nor Taliban forces in the town in an effort to reduce conflict and civilian casualties. At the time, a British officer commented: "There is an obvious danger that the Taliban could make the deal and then renege on it." The Taliban did renege on the agreement, quickly over-running the town with 200 to 300 troops in February 2007. The Taliban seizure followed a US airstrike that incensed militants; a Taliban commander's brother and 20 followers were killed in the attack. A confluence of tribal politics, religion, and money from the opium trade helped ensure the uneasy truce would not hold. At the time, the government claimed they could retake the town within 24 hours, but that plan had been postponed to avoid causing civilian casualties.

Musa Qala was the only significant town held by the Taliban at the time of the assault, and they had imposed a strict rule on its inhabitants. Special tribunals were set up, pronouncing sentences of stoning, amputation, or death by hanging against those who were considered enemies, or who contravened a strict interpretation of the Sharia. Four men are known to have been hanged as spies during this period. The Taliban also levied heavy taxes, closed down schools, and drafted local men into their ranks by force. Other deprivations were reminiscent of previous Taliban rule: men attacked for not wearing beards; music banned and recordings smashed; women punished for not wearing the burqa. The town is situated in a major opium poppy growing area and a BBC correspondent has reported it to be the centre of the heroin trade in Afghanistan.

== Battle ==
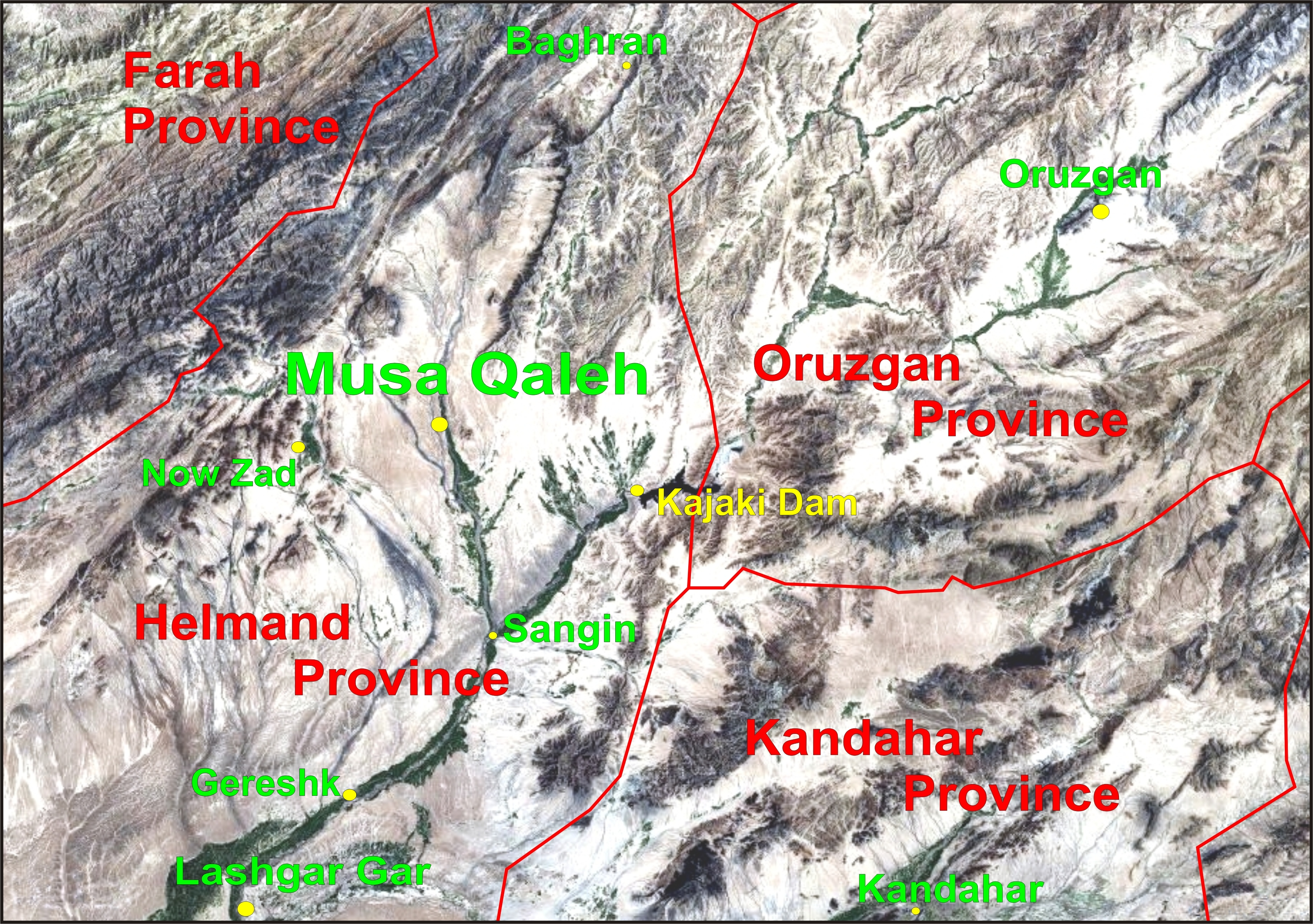
Musa Qaleh, Helmand Province plus surrounding Provinces and some towns.

=== Immediate prelude ===
In the lead up to the assault on Musa Qaleh, members of the Brigade Reconnaissance Force (4/73 (Special OP) Battery) provided vital intelligence for the upcoming operation. Coalition military manoeuvres and a build-up of troops and supplies continued for weeks before the assault. On 1 November, British forces started reconnaissance patrols in preparation for the attack. In the middle of that month, the MOD reported that troops from Brigade Reconnaissance Force (BRF), 40 Commando Royal Marines and the Right Flank Company of the Scots Guards were patrolling outside the town to confuse the Taliban insurgents and disrupt their supply routes.

In the days before the assault, reconnaissance patrols penetrated as close as a 1.5 miles (2.4 km) to the Musa Qala town centre. Hundreds of families were reported to have fled from the pending assault, after the coalition dropped leaflets in warning. Furthermore, the coalition secured the defection of a critical tribal leader, Mullah Abdul Salaam, who had been governor of Uruzgan province under Taliban rule. A leader of the Alizai tribe, Salaam was reported to be in negotiation with the coalition as early as October 2007, causing a rift within the Taliban. His defection was personally sought by Afghan president Hamid Karzai and he brought as many as one third of the Taliban forces defending Musa Qala to the coalition side. However, it is unclear if they fought on the side of the ISAF or simply stayed out of the fight.

Prior to the battle, two thousand militants were reported to be holding the town. A similar claim of 2,050 "fully armed fighters" was made in late November by Enqiadi, a taliban commander. At the time, Enqiadi seemed confident that the whole of Helmand province would fall to the Taliban in the winter of 2007–08. Subsequent estimates reduced numbers of Taliban fighters, with an ISAF officer suggesting that the maximum strength was closer to two to three hundred.

=== Main assault ===
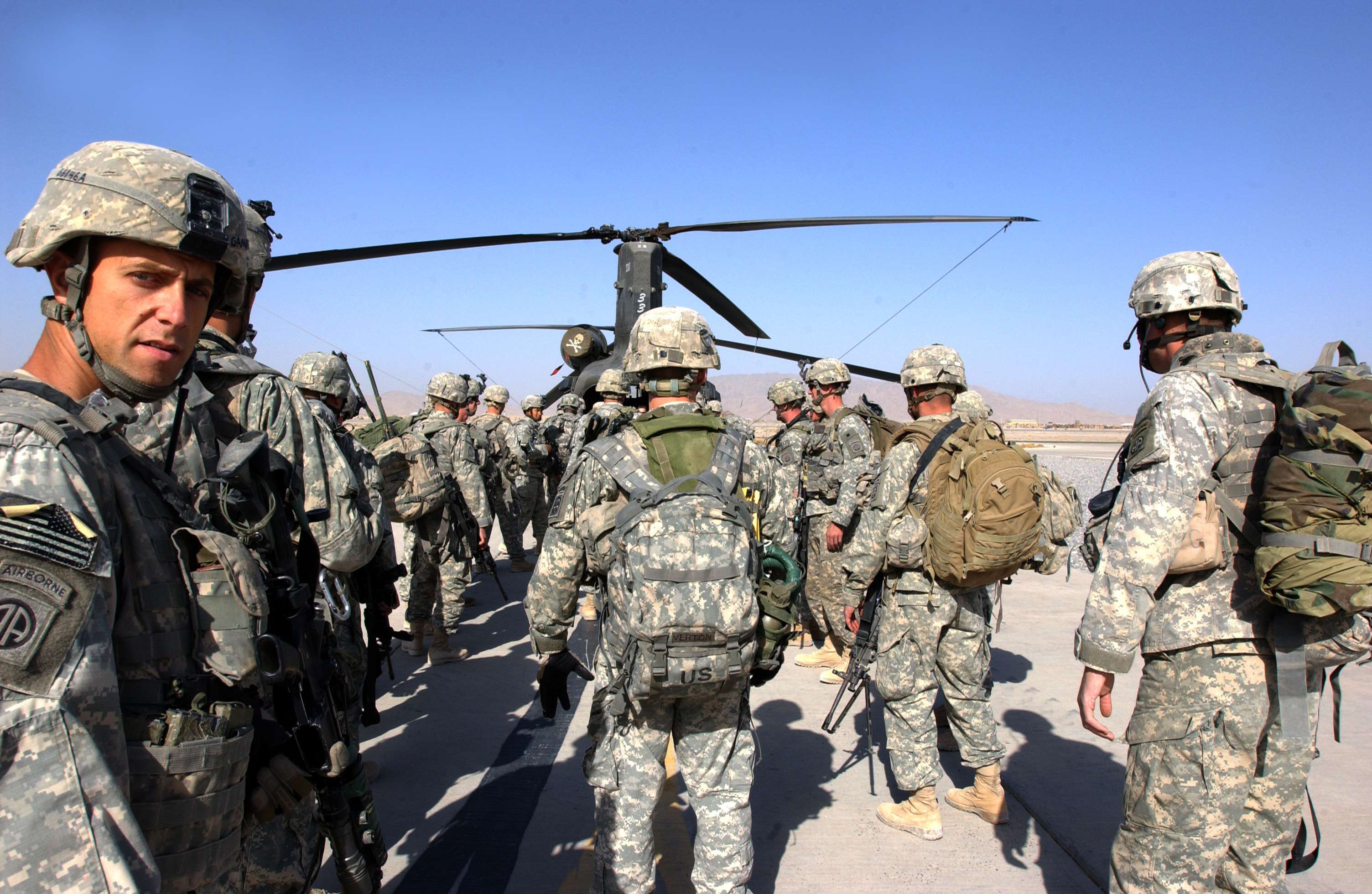
Kandahar Airfield, Afghanistan: Members of the 508th Parachute Infantry Regiment prepare for air assault on Musa Qala.

The main assault on Musa Qala began at 4 pm on 7 December. Several Taliban were reportedly killed in US airstrikes as the attack began. That evening some 600 American soldiers from the 82nd Airborne Division were airlifted to the north of the town in 19 helicopters. Chinook and Blackhawk troop carriers escorted by Apache attack helicopters were involved in the assault. During the night the paratroopers broke through Taliban trenches to clear the way for further ground troops and then dug defensive positions. During the attack, an Apache was hit by ground fire and had one engine knocked out but the pilot, CW2 Thomas O. Malone, managed to land safely despite being injured. More than 2,000 British troops of the Helmand Task Force (then under the direction of 52nd Infantry Brigade), including Scots Guards, Brigade Reconnaissance Force formed by 4/73 Special OP Bty & 2 YORKS, Household Cavalry, and Royal Marines from 40 Commando, became involved in the operation. British troops set up a cordon around the town to aid the US attack and also began an advance with Afghan troops from the south, west, and east, exchanging gunfire with the Taliban. Whilst the BRF provided the US Paratroopers with fire support from the west. At least on the first day of the battle these advances may have served as a feint to divert attention from the main US air assault. Danish and Estonian troops were also involved in the initial assault.

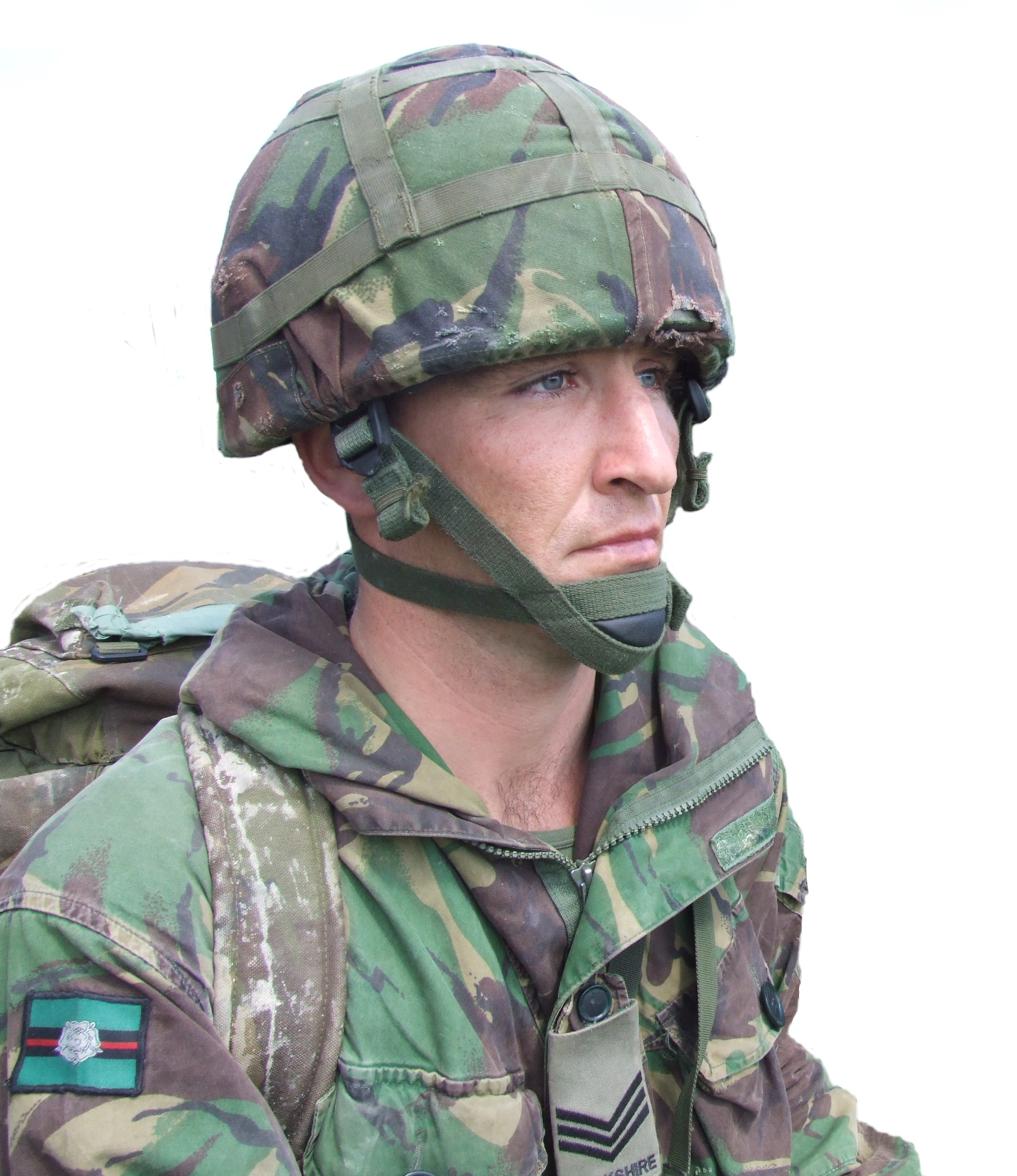
Sergeant Lee Johnson

Fighting continued on 8 December. As British and Afghan soldiers continued their ground advance, US air forces repeatedly attacked the Taliban, including numerous anti-aircraft positions surrounding the town. The Taliban defended positions surrounded by minefields, a principal danger to coalition forces. The assault made progress nonetheless, with the Afghan Ministry of Defence reporting that day: "In this operation so far, 12 terrorists were killed, one captured and a number of weapons and ammunitions were seized." A British soldier, Sergeant Lee Johnson of the 2nd Battalion The Yorkshire Regiment (Green Howards), was killed shortly after 10 am on the eighth, when his vehicle drove over a mine; another soldier was seriously injured in the blast.

Taliban forces took up new positions to defend the town on 9 December. Taliban sources suggested at the time that militants from nearby areas were entering the town to reinforce its defence. Fighting was on-going through the day and bombs planted by insurgents continued to take a toll on ISAF forces: an American soldier, Corporal Tanner J O'Leary of the 508th Parachute Infantry Regiment, was killed by the detonation of an improvised explosive device.

=== Taliban retreat ===
By 10 December, news outlets reported that the Taliban insurgents had withdrawn north from the area and that Afghan Army and ISAF forces were in control of the town. The British MOD was more cautious at the time, advising that "steady progress" had been made but that coalition forces remained on the outskirts of Musa Qala. Nevertheless, the Afghan government suggested that the coalition had "completely captured" the town. NATO announced the town's capture on the 11th, however at the time the MOD suggested forces were still proceeding cautiously "compound to compound", only officially confirmed the capture of Musa Qala the next day. Afghan troops were called forward for the final push and by midday on the twelfth were reported to be in the town centre, in a gesture symbolising their ability to fight and defeat the Taliban on their own. Lieutenant Colonel Richard Eaton, spokesman for Task Force Helmand, described the retaking of the town:

The current situation in Musa Qaleh is that it is underneath the Afghan flag ... Midmorning today [12 December 2007] our operations to relieve and recapture Musa Qaleh were concluded with the final phase being an assault into Musa Qaleh by the Afghan Army.... The cooperation with the Afghan troops has been very good indeed. General Muhayadan was crucially involved in the planning. He moved his planning team to collocate with Headquarters 52 Brigade in Lashkar Gar.

Brigadier Andrew Mackay, commander of the Helmand Task Force, emphasised that the coalition's plan encouraged the less committed local fighters—the so-called "tier two" Taliban—to break away from the more ideologically driven militants. This strategy may have been successful; Afghan president Hamid Karzai declared that he had been approached by Taliban members wanting to swap sides after a string of insurgent exactions against civilians. Precise Taliban casualties were not reported although the Afghan Defence Ministry suggested hundreds killed, detained, or captured. The insurgents claimed 17 Afghan army and ISAF killed, and blamed the British for at least 40 civilians deaths, but their claims may not be reliable.

Although fierce in the first days, the battle did not produce the house-to-house combat that had been feared; the Taliban largely retreated without protracted resistance. Poor weather conditions, including fog, may have allowed them to retreat more easily. Taliban spokesmen suggested the retreat was designed to avoid continued airstrikes and civilian casualties within the town. By the time the town centre was reached, fighting proved "unremarkable" and according to one senior US officer: "The urban center of Musa Qala was not significantly opposed, it was not significantly barricaded".

== Relevance to larger campaign ==
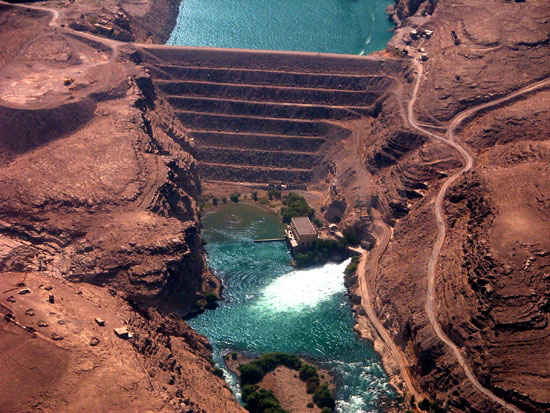
Kajaki Dam, River Helmand

Musa Qala is just one flashpoint in the wider Helmand province campaign, a coalition effort to dislodge the Taliban from the volatile province, largely led by British forces. The battle to retake the town sparked conflict in adjoining areas. In November 2007, when reconnaissance patrols began, "vicious" Taliban attacks were launched in Sangin Valley, Helmand province, to the south, including one which saw Royal Marine Commandos endure two days of rocket and mortar fire. Just three days before the main assault, on 4 December, British forces suffered a fatality to the north of the village of Sangin, when Trooper Jack Sadler was killed by a roadside bomb. The week prior to the assault saw a variety of other engagements in Helmand: the British confronted sustained attack near the Kajaki Dam, northeast of Sangin; further west, Estonian, British and American troops were engaged near the town of Nawzad at the center of Nawzad District. Danish forces under British command were attacked in the town of Gereshk.

In the days after the main battle was launched, Lieutenant Colonel Eaton confirmed that the Taliban were attempting to create pressure in other areas but that attacks on British bases had been repulsed. One Taliban commander noted: "We have launched attacks in Sangin and in Sarwan Kala (Sarevan Qaleh) ... We have orders to attack the British everywhere." When the principal Taliban retreat from Musa Qala occurred fighting continued elsewhere: on the eleventh and twelfth, retreating Taliban militants attacked a government centre in Sangin. They were repulsed with 50 killed, according to the Afghan Defence Ministry. American, British, and other NATO special forces were specifically deployed to prevent the Taliban from withdrawing north into Baghran District, and east into Orūzgān Province, their traditional refuge.

== Aftermath ==
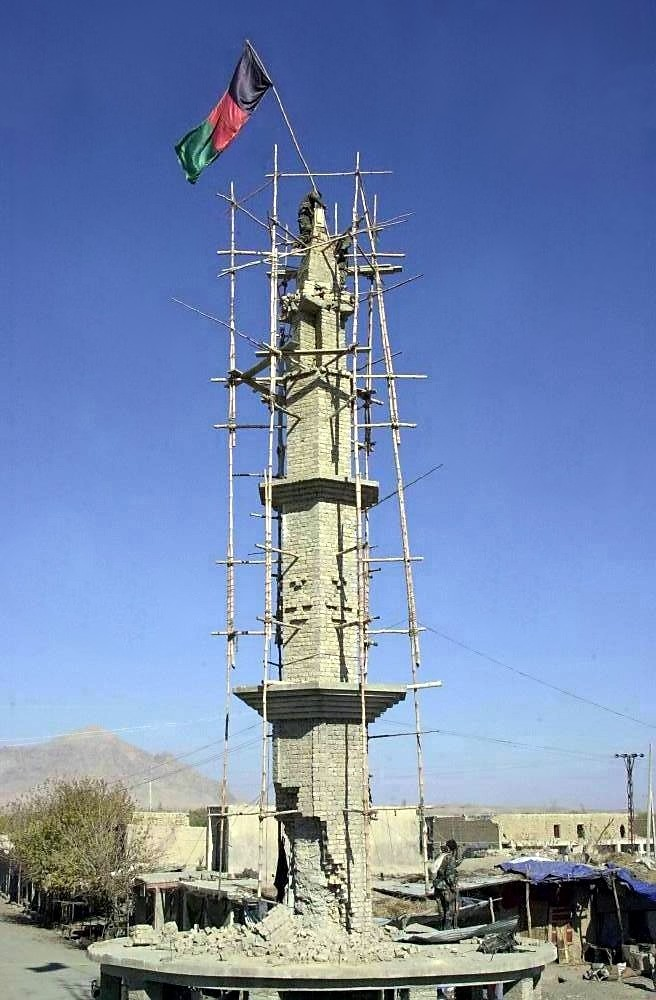
The Afghan flag is raised over Musa Qala following its recapture.

British officers expressed satisfaction that Musa Qala had been recaptured without any artillery shells or bombs hitting the town itself. However, they acknowledged that the Taliban had not been definitively defeated and would probably "have another go" in the area. Taliban fighters were believed to have merged back into the local rural population after the defeat, their traditional dress providing simple cover. In the days after the battle, counter-attacks on the town were considered likely and coalition officials suggested sustained defence would be necessary; British forces plan to reinforce Musa Qala but have emphasised that future defence of the village will be largely Afghan controlled. The optimistic picture of Afghan capability presented by ISAF command has been challenged. A reporter on the ground, writing for The Times, notes that the Afghan forces "could barely function without NATO's protection and NATO had to cajole them to move forward".

British Prime Minister Gordon Brown was in Helmand at the time of the assault, visiting troops at Camp Bastion. He suggested success at Musa Qala would provide a step toward Afghan peace and promised continued reconstruction relief. Coalition and Afghan government plans include the construction of a local mosque, the rebuilding of a district centre, police buildings, schools, and the repair of the electricity infrastructure. The governor of Helmand, Assadullah Wafa, said a delegation would visit Musa Qala to distribute 5,000 tons of aid to returning civilians in the immediate aftermath of the battle. On 26 December, engineers from 69 Gurkha Field Squadron, 36 Engineer Regiment moved into Musa Qala and started rebuilding the district centre. Their task includes the construction of a perimeter fence made of Hesco bastions, and sangars (watchtowers) made of sandbags.

Various Taliban supplies were seized by coalition forces following the battle. On 13 December, British and Afghan army units located bomb factories and weapons caches as they moved further into the outskirts of Musa Qala and searched Taliban positions. At the same time, the first civilians started to return to the area, some with reports of Taliban punishments and claims of active Pakistani and Arab jihadis. A new orientation of British strategy in Helmand is to use military force to curb the influence of local drug barons, whose trade supports the insurgents. On 16 December, British troops burned an estimated £150 to £200 million worth of heroin that had been found in a drug factory and other buildings in Musa Qala.

The strategic purpose of controlling Musa Qala is both to squeeze Taliban operations in south-western Afghanistan and to serve as a symbol of Afghan National Army and ISAF strength; the town had taken on iconic proportions, according to British officials. The Taliban, however, continue to enjoy significant civilian support despite their atrocities and the broader campaign to win over the region remains difficult. Troop shortages have made it difficult for NATO to hold areas seized from the Taliban in southern Afghanistan.

Civilian return to the town was slow, with shops still shuttered on 16 December. Civilian casualty reports were conflicting: one resident claimed 15 dead bodies lay in a single street and another that his family were dead under rubble. The coalition rejected such claims, admitting only that two children had been injured, and possibly killed, when a car driving at high speeds towards ISAF troops during the battle overturned when the driver was shot dead.

Coalition and Afghan authorities continued their efforts to win over Taliban sympathizers. However a "miscommunication between authorities" created some tension. In late December, two western diplomats were expelled from Afghanistan. Governor Assadullah Wafa accused them of holding secret talks with the Taliban and proposing bribes to them; the secret talks were denied as a misunderstanding by a UN spokesperson. In January 2008, Mullah Abdul Salaam was appointed governor of Musa Qala district by the Afghan government, a gesture that was intended to encourage other Taliban commanders to change sides.

== Taliban commanders ==
News reports mentioned numerous Taliban commanders having participated in the Battle of Musa Qala, many reported killed or captured:

- Enqiadi, reported to be a Taliban commander prior to the battle.
- Mullah Ahmadullah, Taliban commander who spoke with the Associated Press during the battle.
- Mullah Abdul Salaam, key tribal leader of the Alizai who defected to the coalition side (see above).
- Mullah Faizullah, deputy Taliban shadow governor of Helmand province, killed in an airstrike.
- Mullah Tor Jan, Musa Qala area commander, supposedly killed in an airstrike. His actual whereabouts remain unknown, as he was again reported killed in an engagement with Afghan and Coalition forces on March 13, 2008.
- Mullah Matin Akhund (also known as Abdul Matin), Taliban district chief of Musa Qala, mistakenly reported captured.
- Mullah Rahim Akhund, Taliban governor of Helmand province, mistakenly reported captured.
