= Dan Zimmerman (politician) =

American politician

Daniel J. Zimmerman (born 1965) is an American retired military officer and politician who served as the 10th Wisconsin Secretary of Veterans Affairs in the Administration of Scott Walker.

== Background ==
Born and raised in New Berlin, Wisconsin, Zimmerman graduated from New Berlin West High School in 1983. Zimmerman received a Bachelor of Science degree in Geography with a Political Science emphasis from the University of Wisconsin–La Crosse and a Master of Arts degree in Homeland Security from American Military University.

Zimmerman served in the United States Army for 25 years. He served as an Army Intelligence officer and Combat Engineer soldier. Zimmerman was deployed several times, including a 2006-2007 deployment as the Director of Strategic Initiatives and de facto Chief of Staff for the Civilian Police Assistance Training Team in Baghdad, Iraq. Zimmerman is a decorated combat veteran, having been awarded two Bronze Star Medals, five Meritorious Service Medals, and other Army, NATO, and foreign medals.

After retiring from the military in 2008, Zimmerman worked as a contracted consult for the United States National Guard and as an exercise officer at the Wisconsin Department of Military Affairs. Zimmerman later served as director of the Reserve Officer Training Corps programs at both Marian University and Ripon College, and served as the founding director of Homeland Security programs at Marian University.

== Political career ==
After retirement from the military, Zimmerman was elected to the Ripon Board of Education. Zimmerman was later elected chairman of the Big Hills Lake Management District in Waushara County. Zimmerman also became president of the National Republican History Museum Foundation.

In 2017, Zimmerman was appointed by Governor of Wisconsin Scott Walker to serve as Secretary of Veterans Affairs. In the role, Zimmerman serves as the primary advocate for the nearly 400,000 veterans residing in Wisconsin.
