= United States Army Installation Management Command =

U.S. Army's primary provider of installation management support

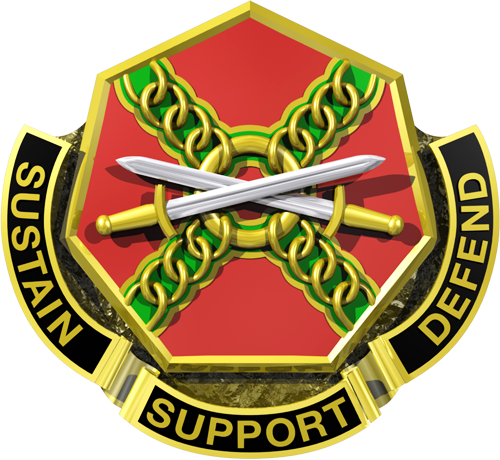
- IMCOM Distinctive Unit Insignia
- Active: 2006–present
- Country: United States of America
- Branch: United States Army
- Type: Support
- Role: Headquarters
- Part of: U.S. Army Materiel Command
- Garrison/HQ: Fort Sam Houston
- Mottos: Sustain, Support, Defend
- Colors: Buff and scarlet
- Website: U.S. Army Installation Management Command

Commanders
- Commanding General: LTG James M. Smith
- Deputy Commanding General: LTG James M. Smith

Insignia
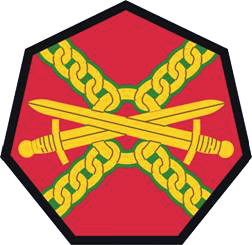
- IMCOM Shoulder Sleeve Insignia

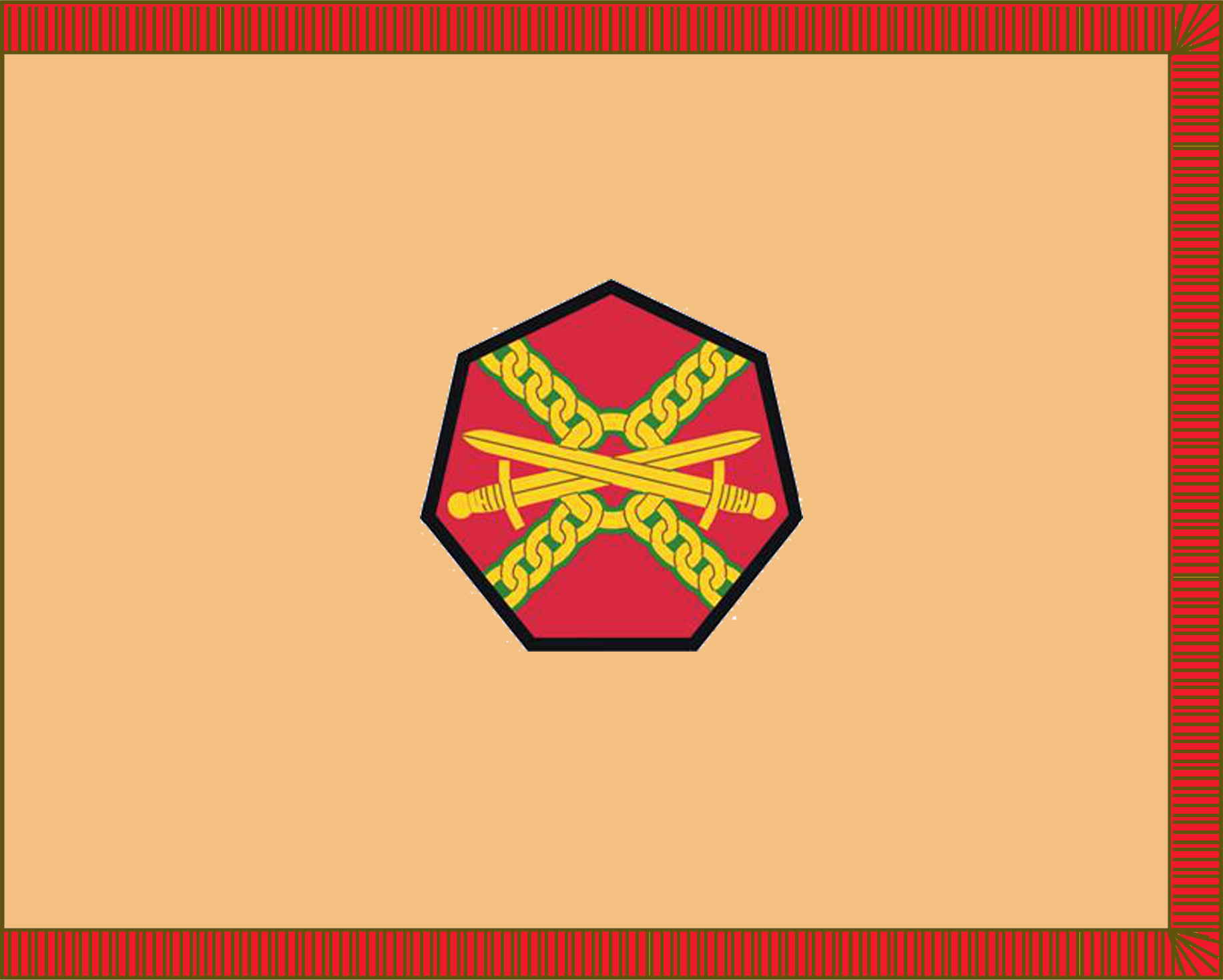
- US Army Installation Management Command Flag

The United States Army Installation Management Command (IMCOM) is a support formation of the United States Army responsible for the day-to-day management of Army installations around the globe. Army garrisons are communities that provide many of the same types of services expected from any small city. IMCOM is a major subordinate command of U.S. Army Materiel Command (AMC). IMCOM is headquartered at Fort Sam Houston.

== History ==
IMCOM was activated on 24 October 2006, to reduce bureaucracy, apply a uniform business structure to manage U.S. Army installations, sustain the environment and enhance the well-being of the military community. It consolidated three organizations under a single command as a direct reporting unit:

1. The former Installation Management Agency (IMA)
2. The former Community and Family Support Center, now called Family and MWR Programs, which was formerly a subordinate command of IMCOM.
3. The former Army Environmental Center, now called the Army Environmental Command (AEC), which is a subordinate command of IMCOM.

Prior to IMCOM, the Army's 184 installations were managed by one of 15 Major Commands. Support services varied – some provided better services, some provided worse. In September 2001, Army Secretary Thomas E. White introduced the Transformation of Installation Management (TIM), formerly known as Centralized Installation Management (CIM), pledging the Army would implement better business practices and realign installation management to create a more efficient and effective corporate management structure for Army installations worldwide. On 1 Oct. 2002, the Army formed IMA as a field operating agency of the Assistant Chief of Staff for Installation Management (ACSIM) as part of an ongoing effort to realign installations.

Many of the issues with the 15 major commands holding responsibility for base support was that the structure created many inequities throughout the Army. There were no common standards, consistent services, or an acutely managed infrastructure. This created an environment where funding was often diverted from installation support to operations. Additionally, there were too many military personnel conducting garrison support operations rather than mission duties. The creation of IMCOM was a commitment to eliminate these inequities, focus on installation management and enhance the well-being of soldiers, families, and civilians. IMCOM’s continued existence is currently under review due to continued challenges and failures in the ability to provide adequate quality of life for soldiers and families. Many senior installation commanders have publicly articulated their desire to see the disbandment of IMCOM, reduction in civilian workforce, and return of installation management under their authority and control of military personnel.

Centralizing installation management was a culture change in the Army; working through the transfers of personnel and funding issues was difficult. In a large organizational change, IMCOM became the Army’s single agency responsible for worldwide installation management, managing 184 Army installations globally with a staff of 120,000 military, civilian and contract members across seven regions on four continents.

== Total Army Strong ==
Originally named "The Army Family Covenant" in 2007, Army leaders undertook a long-term commitment to resource and standardize critical support programs for Soldiers, their families and civilians. The covenant was focused on specific programs which commanders couldn't change. The focus was:

- Standardizing and funding existing family programs and services
- Increasing accessibility and quality of healthcare
- Improving Soldier and family housing
- Ensuring excellence in schools, youth services, and child care
- Expanding education and employment opportunities for family members

In 2014, the program was renamed "Total Army Strong" and commanders were given the flexibility of tailoring local programs best suit their communities.

The Army Family Covenant is the Army’s statement of commitment to provide high quality services to Soldiers – Active component or Reserve components, single or married, regardless of where they serve – and their Families.

The Installation Management Command supports the Total Army Strong and provides a set of tools Soldiers and Army Families can use to locate and access the facilities and services they need.

== IMCOM Directorates ==
The Army Installation Management Command is organized into five directorates, which serve as the intermediate echelon between IMCOM HQ and the garrison, these directorates are:

- IMCOM Training, based at Joint Base Langley–Eustice, Virginia and directly supports Army Training and Doctrine Command, the United States Military Academy, Fort Hamilton and the Army War College.
- IMCOM Western Hemisphere, based at Fort Bragg, North Carolina and directly supports Forces Command, Army Test and Evaluation Command (White Sands Missile Range) and Army Reserve Command.
- IMCOM Sustainment, located at Redstone Arsenal, Alabama and directly supports the Army Materiel Command, Military District of Washington, Army Test and Evaluation Command, Army Medical Command and U.S. Army South.
- IMCOM Europe, based in Germany and supports U.S. Army Europe.
- IMCOM Pacific, located in Hawaii and supports U.S. Army Pacific.

== List of commanding generals ==
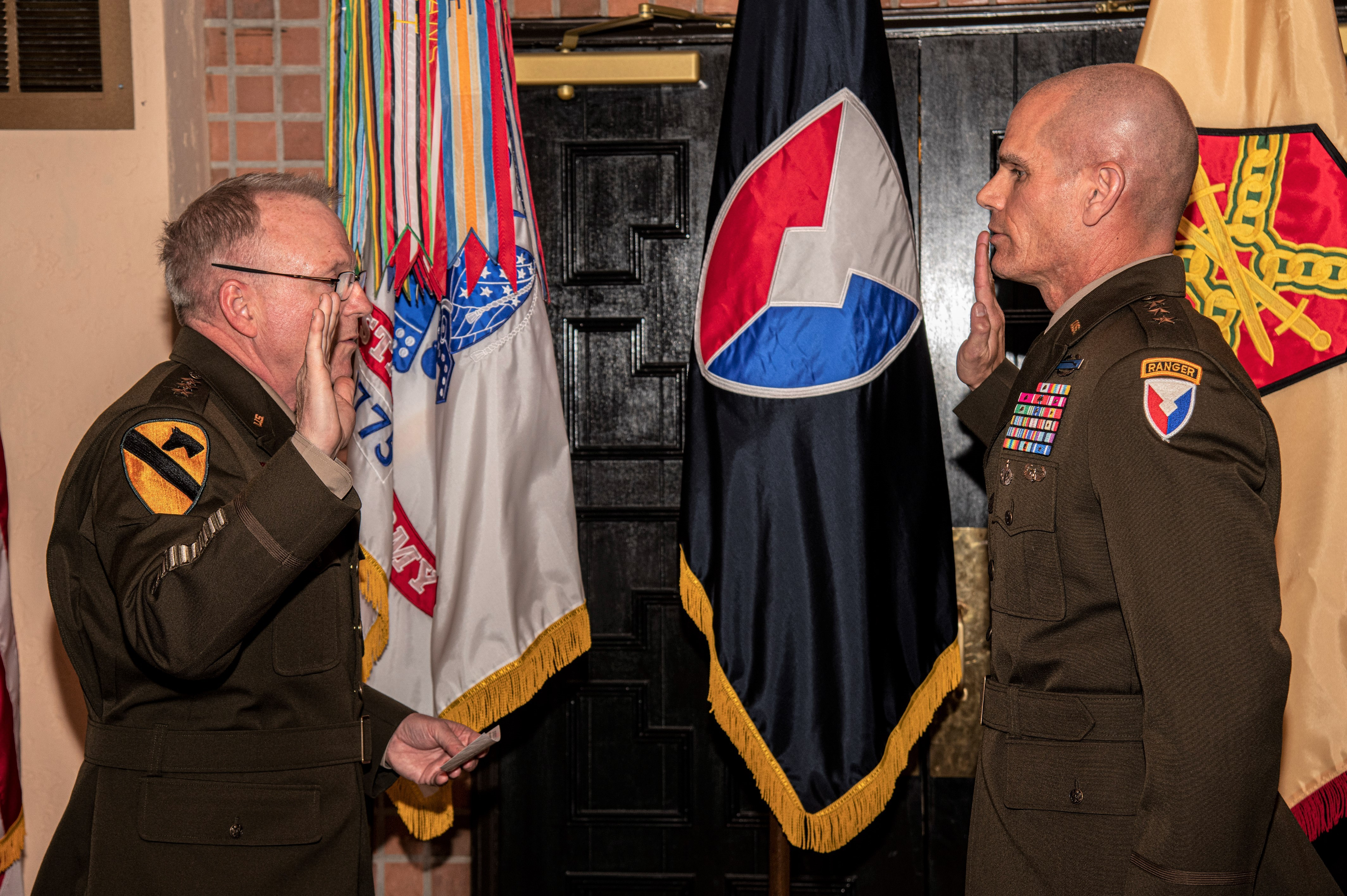
Outgoing IMCOM commander, Lt. Gen. Douglas Gabram swears in his successor, Lt. Gen. Omar J. Jones as commander on July 5, 2022.

No.	Commanding General		Term		
No.	Portrait	Name	Took office	Left office	Duration
Assistant Chief of Staff for Installation Management and Commanding General, U.S. Army Installation Management Command
1	Robert Wilson	Lieutenant General; Robert Wilson	October 24, 2006	November 2, 2009	3 years, 10 days
2	Rick Lynch	Lieutenant General; Rick Lynch	November 2, 2009	November 17, 2011	2 years, 15 days
3	Michael Ferriter	Lieutenant General; Michael Ferriter	November 17, 2011	April 8, 2014	2 years, 142 days
4	David D. Halverson	Lieutenant General; David D. Halverson	April 8, 2014	November 3, 2015	1 year, 209 days
Commanding General, U.S. Army Installation Management Command
5	Kenneth R. Dahl	Lieutenant General; Kenneth R. Dahl	November 3, 2015	September 5, 2018	2 years, 306 days
6	Bradley Becker	Lieutenant General; Bradley Becker	September 5, 2018	August 15, 2019	344 days
–	Timothy McGuire	Major General; Timothy McGuire; Acting	August 15, 2019	June 22, 2020	312 days
7	Douglas Gabram	Lieutenant General; Douglas Gabram	June 22, 2020	July 5, 2022	2 years, 13 days
8	Omar J. Jones IV	Lieutenant General; Omar J. Jones IV	July 5, 2022	July 31, 2025	3 years, 26 days
9	James M. Smith	Lieutenant General; James M. Smith	July 31, 2025	Incumbent	1 year, 108 days
