= Andrew Mackay (British Army officer) =

Major General Andrew Mackay CBE
- Born: Elgin, Scotland
- Military career
- Allegiance: United Kingdom
- Branch: British Army
- Years of service: 1982–2009
- Rank: Major General
- Service number: 513345
- Unit: King's Own Scottish Borderers
- Commands: 2nd Infantry Division; Task Force Helmand; 52nd Infantry Brigade; 1st Battalion, KOSBs; CPATT
- Conflicts / operations: The Troubles; Operation Banner; Bosnian War; Kosovo War; Iraq War; War in Afghanistan
- Awards: Commander of the Order of the British Empire; Queen's Commendation for Valuable Service; Legion of Merit (United States)

Major General Andrew Douglas Mackay, CBE is a former British Army officer who commanded British forces in Helmand, Afghanistan. This was the principal opium-growing region and Britain was responsible in the NATO International Security Assistance Force for the suppression of opium.

== Military career ==
Mackay served in the Royal Hong Kong Police for three years before he was commissioned into the King's Own Scottish Borderers in 1982. He served in Northern Ireland as a company commander and worked on the strategic and operational planning in the Balkans during the Bosnian War and Kosovo War. He was made commanding officer of 1st King's Own Scottish Borderers in 1998.

On promotion to brigadier Mackay served for a year in Baghdad, Iraq. In that capacity he was tasked with setting up and commanding the Civilian Police Assistance Training Team (CPATT). CPATT was responsible for mentoring, training, equipping and organising the Iraqi Police and the Ministry of Interior. During this period Mackay served alongside General David Petraeus and they are said to be close friends. He became commander of the 52nd Infantry Brigade in 2004 and commanded Task Force Helmand in Afghanistan from October 2007, leading the successful assault on Musa Qala in the north of Helmand in December 2007. This action was later described as the "best operation to come out of Afghanistan in years" by the Pentagon. The author Stephen Grey subsequently wrote a best selling book of the battle for Musa Qaleh called Operation Snakebite within which Mackay and his style of leadership featured. The brigade's tour of Helmand was controversial and led to considerable debate within military circles on the emphasis that Mackay placed on the role of influence and non-kinetic operations. Mackay's approach to COIN was also featured in Mark Urban's three part BBC series Afghanistan: War without End. Patrick Rose wrote that "52 Brigade was the first to utilise Influence centric approach; laying the foundations of structures used now".

Mackay was appointed General Officer Commanding 2nd Division and Governor of Edinburgh Castle in May 2009 but resigned only a few months later in September, citing "personal reasons". However, other sources attributed his resignation to frustration over the War in Afghanistan. He subsequently expressed the opinion, in a paper co-authored with Commander Steve Tatham and delivered to the Defence Academy, that the Ministry of Defence was "institutionally incapable of keeping pace with rapid change and the associated willingness to adapt". In 2011 he co-authored with Tatham a book entitled Behavioural Conflict: Why Understanding People and Their Motivations Will Prove Decisive in Future Conflict.

The BBC has twice covered Mackay's recapturing of Musa Qala in specialist programming. In November 2014 he wrote and narrated a BBC Radio 4 documentary about his experiences of Afghanistan. Entitled 'The Lessons of War' he interviewed soldiers, senior US and British generals including David Petraeus, politicians and civil servants to understand if there was ever a high level strategy for the campaign. Mackay told the BBC that "I think whoever you are when you go to an extreme environment such as Helmand, you are never the same person when you come back. I was interested in considering the role that I played as the commander of British forces in Helmand and the journey that it had taken me on."

In September 2015 BBC News ran a specialist feature, entitled 'The Art of Influence', featuring Mackay, on its News Journal website.

Mackay now runs a strategic advisory company – Complexas Ltd – which provides specialist services to the international extractive industries, specifically in Africa. Mackay and Tatham also collaborated with Professor Jim Derleth to write a new paper on Corporate Social Responsibility (CSR) in Africa.

Military offices
| Preceded by David McDowall | General Officer Commanding 2nd Division; May–September 2009 | Succeeded by David Shaw |
