= Paul Eaton =

United States Army general

Paul D. Eaton
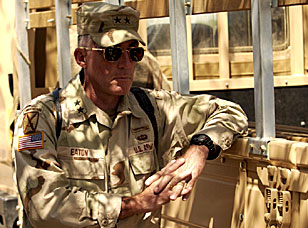
- Born: 1950 (age 75–76)
- Spouse: P.J.
- Military career
- Allegiance: United States
- Branch: United States Army
- Service years: 1972–2006
- Rank: Major general
- Commands: Coalition Military Assistance Training Team; United States Army Infantry School
- Conflicts: Iraq War
- Awards: Army Distinguished Service Medal; Defense Superior Service Medal; Legion of Merit (4)

Paul D. Eaton (born 1950) is a former United States Army officer who commanded the operations to train Iraqi troops during Operation Iraqi Freedom. Eaton served in that capacity between 2003 and 2004, then returned to the US to become Deputy Chief of Staff for Operations and Training, United States Army Training and Doctrine Command, Fort Monroe, Virginia.

He previously served as Senior Adviser to the now-defunct National Security Network, a progressive Washington, D.C.–based think tank focused on foreign policy and defense issues.

== Early life and education ==
Eaton was raised in Oklahoma. His father, U.S. Air Force Colonel Norman Dale Eaton, graduated from the U.S. Military Academy in 1949 and went on to become a U.S. Air Force pilot. He was piloting a B-57B when it crashed on a night interdiction mission over Salavan Province, Laos on 13 January 1969 and he and the other crewman, Paul E. Getchell, were listed as missing in action for many years. His remains were recovered, identified and buried at Arlington National Cemetery in early 2007.

Eaton followed in his father's footsteps to West Point in 1968, graduating with the class of 1972. He is fluent in French, receiving a Master of Arts from Middlebury College in French and Political Science.

== Career ==
As a lieutenant and captain, Eaton served in the 4th Infantry Division, Fort Carson, Colorado, and was later transferred to Germany as part of 4th Brigade, 4th Infantry Division ("Brigade 76"), where he served as an assistant brigade S3 (operations) officer and later was an infantry company commander. As major and lieutenant colonel Eaton was assigned to key battalion and brigade staff positions in the 9th Infantry Division, then on the I Corps staff. He also commanded the 3rd Battalion, 14th Infantry, 2nd Brigade of the 10th Mountain Division at Fort Drum, New York, and later served as the G-3 (operations officer) of the division during Operation Restore Hope in Somalia.

As a colonel in the mid-1990s he commanded an Army brigade in Germany and following promotion to brigadier general was the assistant division commander of the 1st Armored Division. In 2000, he returned to the U.S. to serve as deputy commanding general of the U.S. Army Infantry Center and School at Fort Benning, Georgia, and later he led the creation of the Army's new Stryker brigades at Fort Lewis, Washington. As a major general he returned to Fort Benning to be commanding general of the Army Infantry Center and School. He was then assigned to Iraq as Commanding General of the Coalition Military Assistance Training Team (CMATT), where he was in charge of training the Iraqi military from 2003 to 2004.

Following the first Iraqi army battalion's graduation, their first mission received heavy casualties and raised questions about the efficacy of Iraqi soldiers trained under U.S. supervision. During an initial mission in April 2004 to assist U.S. Marines in Fallujah and under the supervision of a Marine advisory team, the Iraqi soldiers ran from the scene when they first were attacked by insurgents.

"The convoy got stalled when one of the IAF soldiers driving one of the trucks simply jumped out and ran, leaving the truck running. This truck struck a civilian vehicle, creating a jam that prevented part of the convoy from moving. About 30 Iraqi soldiers were lost in this ambush. Some simply ran away, some sold their AK-47s and donned civilian clothes, and some had civilian clothes under their uniforms, so they simply took off their uniforms and ran."

The Marine advisors managed to salvage the convoy and get them to safety, but with significant casualties. What was a battalion of 695 Iraqi soldiers has been reduced significantly with 30 casualties in the ambush, alongside 8 wounded, 24 combat deserters, 104 mutineers, 78 AWOL (absent without leave) and 170 on leave. This stands in contrast to the support of Lt. Gen. Ricardo S. Sanchez, the senior U.S. commander in Iraq, whose remarks during the Iraqi battalion's graduation spoke of "high expectations that in fact they would help us bring security and stability back to the country."

Upon return to the US he was Deputy Chief of Staff for Operations and Training, United States Army Training and Doctrine Command (TRADOC), Fort Monroe, Virginia.

=== VoteVets and the Vet Voice Foundation ===
After retiring from the Army in 2006 Eaton was a frequent guest on various media outlets, where he often criticized the George W. Bush administration's prosecution of the Iraq War. In 2007, Eaton appeared in a political ad for VoteVets.org, similar to the ones prepared by retired Army Major General John Batiste.

Eaton asserted that President George W. Bush did not heed the advice given by his military commanders. Eaton appeared on Bill Maher's HBO talk show and spoke out strongly against those who launched the Iraq War. In 2008 Eaton served as an advisor to Senator Hillary Clinton's presidential campaign. Following Clinton's concession of the Democratic primary, Eaton has made several appearances in support of Senator Barack Obama's presidential campaign. In July 2016, Eaton appeared in a political campaign ad critical of Donald Trump, using the catchphrase "Too Dangerous for America."

Eaton currently serves as a senior advisor to the Vet Voice Foundation which encourages veterans to be active participants in their return to civilian life.

On April 7, 2026, when President Donald Trump threatened “A whole civilization will die tonight, never to be brought back again” if Iran did not meet his deadline, Eaton released a statement warning that any order to that effect would be illegal and should be refused by every service member.

== Awards and decorations ==
Eaton's awards and decorations include the Army Distinguished Service Medal, Defense Superior Service Medal, Legion of Merit (with 3 Oak Leaf Clusters), Meritorious Service Medal (with 2 Oak Leaf Clusters), Army Commendation Medal (with 2 Oak Leaf Clusters), Army Achievement Medal, Expert Infantryman Badge, Parachutist Badge, Ranger Tab, and the Joint Chiefs of Staff Identification Badge.

== Personal life ==
Eaton's wife, P.J., is a former U.S. Army captain and a daughter of a United States Marine Corps colonel. She is now a licensed mental health counselor who primarily works with perpetrators of domestic violence. They were married in 1973. They have two sons and a daughter.

In the 2024 United States presidential election, Eaton endorsed Kamala Harris.
