= 52nd Infantry Brigade (United Kingdom) =

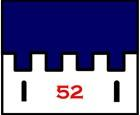
- Modern Insignia of 52 Infantry Brigade, symbolising its role as the main formation in the city of Edinburgh Garrison.
- Active: 1914–1918; 1939–1945; 1982–2010
- Country: United Kingdom
- Branch: British Army
- Type: Infantry
- Role: Light infantry
- Part of: 3rd Infantry Division
- Garrison/HQ: Redford Barracks, Edinburgh
- Engagements: First World War Battle of the Somme Battle of Arras (1917) Third Battle of Ypres First Battle of the Somme (1918) Second Battle of the Somme (1918) Battle of Havrincourt Battle of Épehy Battle of Cambrai (1918) Battle of the Selle Battle of the Sambre (1918) War in Afghanistan (2001–present) Battle of Musa Qala, 2007

Commanders
- Current commander: Brigadier C.J. Lawrence

The 52nd Infantry Brigade was a formation of the British Army, which was first formed in 1914 as part of Kitchener's Army. The brigade was disbanded in 1919, but reformed in British India during the Second World War and disbanded in 1945. It was again formed in 1982, and existed until 2010.

== History ==
=== First World War ===
It first formed in September 1914 as part of the 17th (Northern) Division, part of the K2 Army Group . It spent the whole war with the Division on the Western Front, until May 1919 when it was disbanded.

==== Order of battle ====
The following units served with the brigade.

- 10th (Service) Battalion, Lancashire Fusiliers (left August 1917)
- 12th (Service) Battalion, Manchester Regiment
- 9th (Service) Battalion, Duke of Wellington's (West Riding Regiment)
- 9th (Service) Battalion, Northumberland Fusiliers (until August 1917)
- 3/4th Battalion, Queen's Own (Royal West Kent Regiment) (joined 3 August 1917, disbanded by 20 February 1918)
- 52nd Machine Gun Company (joined 12 February 1916, left 24 February 1918)
- 52nd Trench Mortar Battery (formed by 15 June 1916)

=== Second World War ===
The Brigade was reformed in September 1943 as a training formation for jungle warfare replacements. It was redesignated as Headquarters Training Group on 1 August 1945, and ceased to exist as the 52nd Brigade.

==== Order of battle ====
The following units served with the brigade.

- 20th Battalion, Royal Fusiliers (from 15 November 1943)
- 7th Battalion, South Lancashire Regiment (from 20 November 1943)
- 12th Battalion, Sherwood Foresters (from 1 January 1944)
- 8th Battalion, York and Lancaster Regiment (from 1 May 1945)

=== 1982-2010 ===
The brigade was reformed in 1982, when the Lowland District was redesignated. The 52nd (Lowland) Brigade is linked with the historical 52nd (Lowland) Infantry Division. The brigade consisted of the 1st and 2nd Battalions of the 52nd Lowland Volunteers, as well as other TA units in the Scottish Lowlands.

The Brigade was retitled 52 Infantry Brigade on 1 April 2002, taking command of Regular Army units in Scotland and the North West of England and giving up its regional and TA responsibilities to 51 Scottish Brigade. This freed 52 Brigade to parent regular light role battalions for operational deployments. 52 Infantry Brigade was transferred to 3rd (UK) Division on 1 April 2007. The Brigade was only used once operationally, for a deployment to Afghanistan in 2007/08.

==== Operation Herrick VII ====
In November 2006, it was reported that Land Command planners had offered up HQ 52 Infantry Brigade, under the command of Brigadier Andrew Mackay for a November 2007 deployment to Afghanistan for Operation Herrick VII, and that the rotation plan 'was now awaiting final approval by government ministers.'

In July 2007, the Ministry of Defence announced that 52 Brigade would provide the command element for the UK Task Force on Operation Herrick VII in Afghanistan. They served in Afghanistan between 7 September and 8 March, and were relieved in spring 2008 by 16 Air Assault Brigade. During the time that the Brigade were in Afghanistan, they successfully retook the strategic Taliban stronghold of Musa Qala. Brigadier MacKay subsequently received a CBE for his work.

===== 2007 Order of Battle =====
The Brigade in 2007 consisted of the Brigade HQ which was split between Redford Barracks and Edinburgh Castle and the following units:

- 52 Infantry Brigade Headquarters and Signal Squadron (258 Signal Squadron)
- 1st Battalion, The Rifles (Light Role Support Infantry Battalion) – Edinburgh
- 3rd Battalion, The Rifles (Light Role Infantry Battalion) – Redford Barracks
- 2nd Battalion, Royal Gurkha Rifles (Light Role Infantry Battalion) – Sir John Moore Barracks
- 2nd Battalion, Yorkshire Regiment (Light Role Infantry Battalion) – Weeton Barracks
- 2nd (Royal Highland Fusiliers) Battalion, Royal Regiment of Scotland (Light Role Infantry Battalion) – Edinburgh

==== Disbandment ====
On its return the Brigade returned to Regional tasks including being a Regional Training Centre and involvement in the Edinburgh Tattoo. The headquarters of 52 Infantry Brigade were located at Edinburgh's Redford Barracks, with some administrative functions located in the New Barrack Block at Edinburgh Castle. The unit no longer exists under Army 2020, and was disbanded in 2010.

== See also ==
- Military history of Scotland
