= Rick Lynch =

US Army lieutenant general (born 1955)

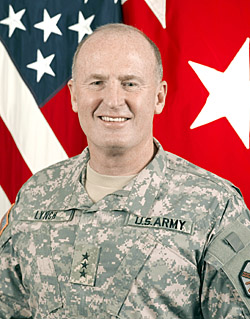
- Lynch as commander of the United States Army Installation Management Command in 2010
- Born: 1955 (age 70–71); Hamilton, Ohio, US
- Alma mater: United States Military Academy; Massachusetts Institute of Technology; United States Army Command and General Staff College; United States Army War College
- Spouse: Sarah Cockerham (m. 1982)
- Children: 2
- Military career
- Service: United States Army
- Service years: 1977–2012
- Rank: Lieutenant General
- Units: US Army Corps of Engineers; US Army Armor Branch
- Commands: 1st Battalion, 8th Cavalry Regiment; 1st Brigade, 4th Infantry Division; 3rd Infantry Division; III Armored Corps; United States Army Installation Management Command
- Wars: Gulf War; Kosovo Force; Iraq War
- Awards: Army Distinguished Service Medal (2); Defense Superior Service Medal (2); Legion of Merit (2); Bronze Star Medal (2); Defense Meritorious Service Medal; Joint Service Commendation Medal; Army Achievement Medal (2)
- Other work: Leadership and strategic planning consultant Public speaker Author

Rick Lynch (born 1955) is a retired United States Army officer. A 1977 graduate of the United States Military Academy at West Point, he served from 1977 until retiring in 2012. He attained the rank of lieutenant general, and his command assignments included: 1st Battalion, 8th Cavalry Regiment; 1st Brigade, 4th Infantry Division; 3rd Infantry Division; III Armored Corps; and United States Army Installation Management Command. He is a veteran of the Iraq War, and his awards include the two awards of the Army Distinguished Service Medal, two awards of the Defense Superior Service Medal, two awards of the Legion of Merit, two awards of the Bronze Star Medal, the Defense Meritorious Service Medal, the Joint Service Commendation Medal, and two awards of the Army Achievement Medal.

== Biography ==
Rick Lynch was born in Hamilton, Ohio in 1955, a son of Calvin Lynch and Dorothy "Dodi" Lynch. He was raised and educated in Hamilton, and is a 1973 graduate of Hamilton's Taft High School (now Hamilton High School). In 1973, he was appointed to the United States Military Academy by US Representative Walter E. Powell. Lynch graduated in 1977 and received his commission as a second lieutenant of Engineers. During his college career Lynch attained the rank of cadet captain and regimental commander. He was on the dean's list, was at the head of his Russian language class, was a member of the freshman volleyball club, and played intra-mural handball, soccer, and flickerball.

=== Military and civilian education ===
- United States Military Academy, Bachelor of Science, general studies, 1977
- Massachusetts Institute of Technology, Master of Science, mechanical engineering with robotics focus, 1985
- Engineer Officer Basic Course
- Armor Officer Advanced Course
- Combined Arms and Services Staff School (CAS3)
- United States Army Command and General Staff College
- United States Army War College, 1996

== Military career ==
Lynch's early assignments included command of a combat engineer company and a mobile assault bridge company in the 17th Engineer Battalion. After transferring to the Armor branch, he served as executive officer of the 11th Armored Cavalry Regiment during Operation Desert Storm. Lynch later commanded 1st Battalion, 8th Cavalry Regiment and 1st Brigade, 4th Infantry Division. Major staff assignments included: Joint Chiefs of Staff Joint Advanced Warfighting Program; robotics project officer at the Armor Center's combat development directorate; and chief of force development at the Armor Center. Assignments after attaining general officer rank in 2001 included: assistant division commander, 4th Infantry Division; chief of staff, Kosovo Force; and deputy chief of staff for operations, Allied Joint Force Command Naples. During the Iraq War, he served as deputy chief of staff for strategic effects and press spokesman for Multi-National Force – Iraq.

Lynch commanded the 3rd Infantry Division from 2006 to 2008, including deployment to Iraq during the Iraq War troop surge of 2007. After returning to the United States, he was assigned to command III Armored Corps. His final assignment prior to retiring in 2012 was commander of the United States Army Installation Management Command and the army's assistant chief of staff for Installation Management.

== Later career ==
Lynch's post-military career included work as executive director of the University of Texas at Arlington Research Institute (UTARI), where he was responsible for developing partnerships between the faculty and staff, industry, and government. He also authored several books, including:

- We're Not Robots: How Leading with Humanity Creates High-Performing Organizations
- Adapt or Die: Leadership Principles from an American General
- Work Hard, Pray Hard: The Power of Faith in Action.

In addition, Lynch formed R Lynch Enterprises, which provides speaking services and consulting on topics including strategic planning and leadership.

== Awards ==
Lynch's major awards include:

- Army Distinguished Service Medal with oak leaf cluster
- Defense Superior Service Medal with oak leaf cluster
- Legion of Merit with oak leaf cluster
- Soldier's Medal
- Bronze Star Medal with oak leaf cluster
- Defense Meritorious Service Medal
- Meritorious Service Medal with four oak leaf clusters
- Joint Service Commendation Medal
- Army Commendation Medal with three oak leaf clusters
- Army Achievement Medal with oak leaf cluster
- Parachutist Badge
- Joint Chiefs of Staff Identification Badge

In 2023, Lynch was the commencement speaker at Clarkson University and was awarded the honorary degree of Doctor of Engineering.
