= United States Army Environmental Command =

United States Army command responsible for environmental programs

- Active: November 15, 1972 – present
- Country: United States
- Branch: United States Army
- Type: Subordinate command
- Role: Environmental cleanup, compliance, conservation and pollution prevention
- Part of: United States Army Installation Management Command
- Headquarters: Fort Sam Houston, Joint Base San Antonio, Texas
- Website: aec.army.mil

Commanders
- Commander: COL, Danielle C. Taylor

The United States Army Environmental Command (USAEC) is a subordinate command of the United States Army Installation Management Command (IMCOM). USAEC manages the Army's environmental programs, including contaminated-land cleanup, regulatory compliance, resource conservation, and pollution prevention. It is headquartered at Fort Sam Houston, part of Joint Base San Antonio, Texas, having relocated from Aberdeen Proving Ground, Maryland, in 2010.

The organization traces its origin to 1972, when the Army created an office to oversee destruction of chemical weapons, and was known from about 1980 to 1993 as the U.S. Army Toxic and Hazardous Materials Agency (USATHAMA) and from 1993 to 2006 as the U.S. Army Environmental Center.

== History ==
=== Chemical demilitarization origins (1972–1980) ===
The command was established on November 15, 1972, when the Army created the Program Manager for Demilitarization of Chemical Materiel to destroy the nation's stocks of toxic chemical agents and munitions. In 1975 the office also took on management of the newly created Installation Restoration Program, which assessed environmental conditions at Army installations. It was renamed the Department of the Army Project Manager for Chemical Demilitarization and Installation Restoration and placed under the United States Army Materiel Command (AMC).

=== USATHAMA (1980–1993) ===
Between 1978 and 1980 the Army's environmental responsibilities grew to include research, testing and pollution control technology, and the organization became the U.S. Army Toxic and Hazardous Materials Agency (USATHAMA), based at Aberdeen Proving Ground. Under the Installation Restoration Program, USATHAMA carried out installation assessments and records searches at Army sites, a number of which were later placed on the Superfund National Priorities List, such as the Alabama Army Ammunition Plant.

As the Army's environmental work expanded, parts of the mission were separated out. A dedicated program manager was created in 1985 for the cleanup of Rocky Mountain Arsenal in Colorado, and in 1986 a separate program was set up for destruction of chemical agents and weapons. In 1988, when environmental compliance was added to its responsibilities, USATHAMA moved from AMC to the United States Army Corps of Engineers.

=== Army Environmental Center (1993–2006) ===
In 1993 the agency's role shifted from carrying out programs to managing them. It was renamed the U.S. Army Environmental Center, a field operating agency at Aberdeen Proving Ground reporting to the newly created Assistant Chief of Staff for Installation Management.

=== Army Environmental Command (2006–present) ===
In 2006 the center became the U.S. Army Environmental Command, and in October of that year it joined the newly formed Installation Management Command as a subordinate command.

The 2005 Base Realignment and Closure round directed the command to move to Fort Sam Houston. Operations and personnel relocated between June 2009 and September 2011; the command's colors were cased at Aberdeen Proving Ground on May 5, 2010, and uncased at Fort Sam Houston on May 21, 2010. USAEC was the first element of the IMCOM community to complete the move to San Antonio, which brought about 200 jobs to the area.

On March 1, 2019, IMCOM was realigned as a major subordinate command of Army Materiel Command, returning USAEC to the AMC chain of command it had left in 1988.

== Mission and programs ==
USAEC describes its work in four program areas: cleanup, compliance, conservation and pollution prevention. The command's workforce is predominantly civilian and includes biologists, chemists, engineers and lawyers who advise and oversee installation environmental programs across the Army.

- Cleanup – management of restoration at active and former Army sites, including community engagement through Restoration Advisory Boards.
- Compliance – the Environmental Performance Assessment System (EPAS), under which USAEC teams assess each IMCOM installation on a three-year cycle for compliance with laws such as the Clean Air Act and Clean Water Act, or with the applicable governing standards at overseas garrisons.
- Conservation – natural and cultural resource management intended to keep training lands available for military use.
- Pollution prevention – technical support for reducing waste and environmental liabilities at installations.

== Leadership ==
USAEC is a brigade-level command led by a colonel, assisted by a command sergeant major. Commanders have included:

| Commander | Term | Notes |
|---|---|---|
| Col. Maria Gervais | 2008–2010 | Later a lieutenant general |
| Col. Scott D. Kimmell | 2010–? | First commander at Fort Sam Houston |
| Col. Timothy Greenhaw | 2016–2018 | |
| Col. Isaac C. Manigault | 2018–2020 | |
| Col. Alicia M. Masson | 2020–2022 | |
| Col. Matthew F. Kelly | 2022–2024 | |
| Col. Vance M. Brunner | 2024– | Assumed command June 27, 2024 |

== See also ==
- United States Army Installation Management Command
- United States Army Chemical Materials Activity
- Defense Environmental Restoration Program
