= Frank Helmick =

United States general

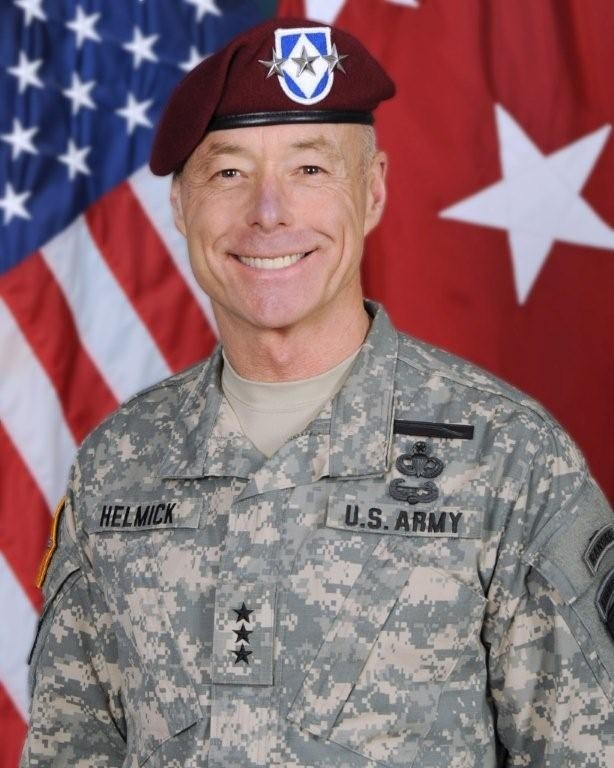
- Born: April 29, 1953 (age 73)
- Military career
- Allegiance: United States of America
- Branch: United States Army
- Service years: 1976–2012
- Rank: Lieutenant General
- Commands: XVIII Airborne Corps and Fort Bragg; Multi-National Security Transition Command Iraq; Southern European Task Force
- Conflicts: Iraq War: Operation Iraqi Freedom
- Awards: Defense Distinguished Service Medal; Distinguished Service Medal; Defense Superior Service Medal; Legion of Merit; Bronze Star Medal

Frank Helmick (born April 29, 1953) is a retired United States Army lieutenant general. He is the former commanding general of the XVIII Airborne Corps. From February to December 2011, he additionally served as the deputy commanding general for operations, United States Forces – Iraq. Prior to assuming command of the XVIII Airborne Corps, LTG Helmick commanded the Multi-National Security Transition Command - Iraq along with the NATO Training Mission-Iraq from July 3, 2008, to October 7, 2009.

Helmick has held numerous command and senior staff positions. He has commanded and served in many units in both operational and training commands: Commander 3rd Battalion, 504th Parachute Infantry Regiment, 82nd Airborne Division, Fort Bragg, North Carolina; Commander Ranger Training Brigade, Fort Benning, Georgia; Assistant Division Commander 101st Airborne Division (Air Assault), Fort Campbell, Kentucky; Commander of the Southern European Task Force (Airborne), Vicenza, Italy.

His staff assignments include service in the 82nd Airborne Division, the Joint Staff, and the Office of the Secretary of Defense where he served as the Senior Military Advisor to the Deputy Secretary of Defense.

== Career ==
=== Iraq War ===
Helmick was the commander who led the attack in Mosul that killed Uday and Qusay Hussein, Saddam Hussein's sons.

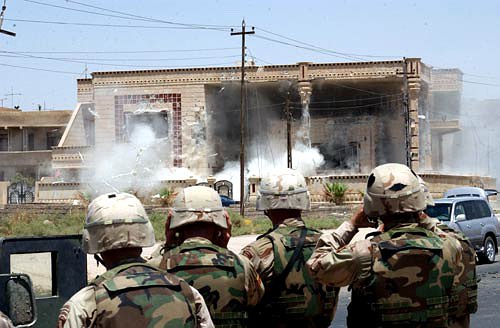
U.S. Army soldiers from the 101st Airborne Division (Air Assault) watch as a TOW missile strikes the side of a building that was suspected of harboring Uday and Qusay Hussein in Mosul, Iraq, July 22, 2003. Uday and Qusay were killed in a gun battle as they resisted efforts by coalition forces to apprehend and detain them.

On August 24, 2008, Helmick survived a suicide bombing of the MRAP vehicle he was riding in near Forward Operating Base Marez in Mosul. The suicide car bomb attack killed the attacker and damaged the International MaxxPro Plus vehicle, but Helmick, Brigadier General Raymond "Tony" Thomas, an Iraqi general and others inside the vehicle were not seriously injured.

== Personal life ==
Helmick has attended a variety of military schools including the United States Military Academy, Infantry Officer Basic Course, the Armor Officer Advanced Course, the Naval Postgraduate School, the United States Armed Forces Staff Course at the Armed Forces Staff College, and the United States Army War College.

== Awards and decorations ==
Expert Infantryman Badge
Combat Action Badge
Ranger Tab
Master Parachutist Badge
Air Assault Badge
Office of the Secretary of Defense Identification Badge
Joint Chiefs of Staff Identification Badge

Defense Distinguished Service Medal with two oak leaf clusters
Distinguished Service Medal
Defense Superior Service Medal
Legion of Merit with two oak leaf clusters
Bronze Star Medal with oak leaf cluster
Meritorious Service Medal with three oak leaf clusters
Joint Service Commendation Medal
Army Commendation Medal with silver oak leaf cluster
Army Achievement Medal with oak leaf cluster
Good Conduct Medal
Joint Meritorious Unit Award
Army Superior Unit Award
National Defense Service Medal with one bronze service star
Armed Forces Expeditionary Medal
Global War on Terrorism Expeditionary Medal
Iraq Campaign Medal with three campaign stars
Global War on Terrorism Service Medal
Army Service Ribbon
Overseas Service Ribbon
NATO Medal (Kosovo)
Multinational Force and Observers Medal

== Assignments ==
From	To	Assignments
November 1976	July 1977	Platoon Leader, B Company, 1st Battalion, 5th Cavalry, 1st Cavalry Division, Fort Hood, Texas
July 1977	July 1980	Platoon Leader, Executive Officer, and Company Commander, C Company, 2nd Battalion, 7th Cavalry, 1st Cavalry Division, Fort Hood, Texas
August 1983	June 1984	Organizational Effectiveness Staff Officer, XVIII Airborne Corps, Fort Bragg, North Carolina
June 1984	May 1985	Aide-de-Camp to the Deputy Commanding General, XVIII Airborne Corps, Fort Bragg, North Carolina
May 1985	April 1986	S-3 (Operations), 3rd Battalion (Airborne), 325th Infantry Regiment, 82nd Airborne Division, Fort Bragg, North Carolina
April 1986	April 1989	S-3 (Operations) and Executive Officer, 3rd Battalion (Airborne), 325th Infantry Regiment, Vicenza, Italy
February 1990	December 1990	Assignment Officer, Infantry Branch, United States Total Army Personnel Command, Alexandria, VA
December 1990	November 1991	Distribution Management Officer and Personnel Management Officer, Officer Distribution Division, United States Total Army Personnel Command, Alexandria, VA
November 1991	February 1994	Chief (Exercises), Operations Officer and Executive Officer, 75th Ranger Regiment, Fort Benning, GA
February 1994	May 1996	Commander, 3rd Battalion, 504th Parachute Infantry Regiment, 82nd Airborne Division, Fort Bragg, North Carolina
May 1996	July 1997	G-3 (Operations), 82nd Airborne Division, Fort Bragg, North Carolina
July 1998	June 2000	Commander, Ranger Training Brigade, Fort Benning, Georgia
June 2000	July 2002	Chief, Operations and Intelligence Division, J-34, The Joint Staff, Washington, DC
July 2002	June 2003	Assistant Division Commander (Maneuver) and Acting Division Commander, 24th Infantry Division (Mechanized), Fort Riley, Kansas
June 2003	April 2004	Assistant Division Commander (Operations), 101st Airborne Division (Air Assault), Fort Campbell, Kentucky and Operation Iraqi Freedom, Iraq
April 2004	May 2006	Senior Military Assistant to the Deputy Secretary of Defense, Office of the Deputy Secretary of Defense, Washington, DC
July 2006	July 2008	Commanding General, United States Army Southern European Task Force, Italy
July 2008	November 2009	Commander, Multi-National Security Transition Command – Iraq / Commander, NATO Training Mission – Iraq, Operation Iraqi Freedom, Iraq
November 2009	June 2012	Commanding General, XVIII Airborne Corps and Fort Bragg, North Carolina
February 2011	December 2011	Deputy Commanding General - Operations, United States Forces - Iraq

== Effective dates of promotion ==
Rank	Date Of appointment
Second Lieutenant	June 2, 1976
First Lieutenant	June 2, 1978
Captain	August 1, 1980
Major	August 1, 1987
Lieutenant Colonel	March 1, 1993
Colonel	June 1, 1998
Brigadier General	March 1, 2003
Major General	November 2, 2006
Lieutenant General	July 3, 2008
