= Civilian Police Assistance Training Team =

Civilian Police Assistance Training Team (CPATT)
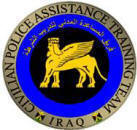
- CPATT personnel in Iraq
- Active: May 1, 2003 – present
- Country: United States-led coalition
- Branch: Various (United States, United Kingdom, Italy, Canada, Denmark, Czech Republic)
- Role: Advisory and training support for Iraqi police
- Part of: MNSTC-I
- Garrison/HQ: International Zone, Green Zone, Baghdad, Iraq
- Engagements: Iraq War

Commanders
- Previous commander: Brigadier Andrew Mackay
- Previous commander: Major General Nelson J. Cannon

The Civilian Police Assistance Training Team or CPATT was a multinational advisory team operating within the US-led coalition in Iraq to rebuild the Iraqi Police.

Its officially stated mission was 'In partnership with the Iraqi government, the Civilian Police Assistance Training Team (CPATT) assists in the development of the Ministry of Interior, (MoI), and its Forces in order to contribute to the defeat of insurgency and to create a safe and secure Iraq in which the government can establish democratic rule of law.'

== Organization ==
CPATT was commanded by US Major General Michael Jones and is headquartered in the International Zone, Green Zone, in Baghdad. It is one of three training teams which are part of MNSTC-I Multi-National Security Transition Command.

CPATT was a subordinate command to the Multi-National Security Transition Command – Iraq (MNSTC-I) that was started by General David Petraeus during the start of the Iraq war. In executing its duties, CPATT funnels its funds to man, train, and equip the civil security forces of the Ministry of Interior in Iraq. This includes the Iraqi Police Service, the Department of Border Enforcement, the National Police and additional specialized units. The coalition civilian police personnel consist mainly of two groups. The International Police Liaison Officers (IPLOs) who are contracted directly through the US Department of State – Bureau for International Narcotics and Law Enforcement Affairs (INL) and the International Police Trainers (IPTs) who are contracted through the US Department of Justice. The United Kingdom provides trainers to the Baghdad facilities and the Basrah region. Smaller groups of police officers are provided by Italy (Carabinieri), Canada, Denmark and the Czech Republic.

== History ==
On May 1, 2003 the first civilian police advisors arrived in Iraq and began the process of assessing the training needs of the Iraqi police. The first supervisory entity was known as the Office for Reconstruction and Humanitarian Assistance (ORHA), which was headed by retired US Army Lieutenant General Jay Garner. The successor to ORHA was the Coalition Provisional Authority (CPA), headed by Ambassador L. Paul Bremer, who was the Civil Administrator. Ambassador Bremer appointed Iraqi officials to serve as the Iraq Governing Council and developed a longer term plan for conducting elections.

CPATT was initially developed in response to an assessment report on Iraqi security forces and Coalition efforts at rebuilding them, prepared by a team headed by US Army retired Major General Karl Eikenberry. His report was delivered in early 2004 and it sought, in part, to replicate the successes for the Iraqi police that had been achieved by the Coalition Military Assistance Training Team (CMATT) for the Iraqi Armed Forces. Lt Gen Ricardo Sanchez who commanded the Multi National Force - Iraq then set up a Police Working Group under the command of Brigadier Andrew Mackay to examine the extent of the problem, recommend solutions including the appropriate organisational structure.

Some CPA policies dramatically affected the course and nature of police reconstitution programs. CPA Order Number One, entitled the “De-Ba’athification of Iraqi Society,” dismissed all persons holding any of the top four ranks in the Ba’ath Party from their positions and further forbade them to hold a position in a future Iraqi government.

Under Saddam Hussein’s regime, in order to hold a high rank in a government concern, it was virtually mandatory to also hold a high rank in the Ba’ath Party. By dismissing such great numbers of government employees out of hand, the CPA also lost some badly needed institutional knowledge on how government agencies functioned and how problems might best be attacked.

In March 2004, Brigadier Andrew Mackay of the British Army was appointed as the first Commanding General of CPATT. Initially, CPATT was subordinate to Major General Eaton and the Office of Security Transition (OST), but in June 2004, the Multi-National Security Transition Command – Iraq (MNSTC-I) was established and LTG David Petraeus appointed as its Commanding General. In 2008 MNSTC-I reorganized, creating two Directorates the Directorate of Interior Affairs (DoIA) and the Directorate of Defense Affairs (DDA). CPATT, currently under the command of Major General Nelson J. Cannon, is now a subordinate unit of DoIA.

In June 2009, the organization structure changed again with the creation of the Iraqi Training and Advisory Mission (ITAM) led by US Army Major General Richard J. Rowe, Jr, the Iraqi Security Assistance Mission (ISAM), and the Partnership Strategy Group (PSG-I). ITAM and ISAM, INCTF and PSG-I report to the Deputy Commanding General. ITAM was focused on institutional training while ISAM focused on Foreign Military Sales.

Under the new ITAM structure the Civilian Police Assistance Training Team became ITAM-Police.
