= Michael Ferriter =

United States Army general

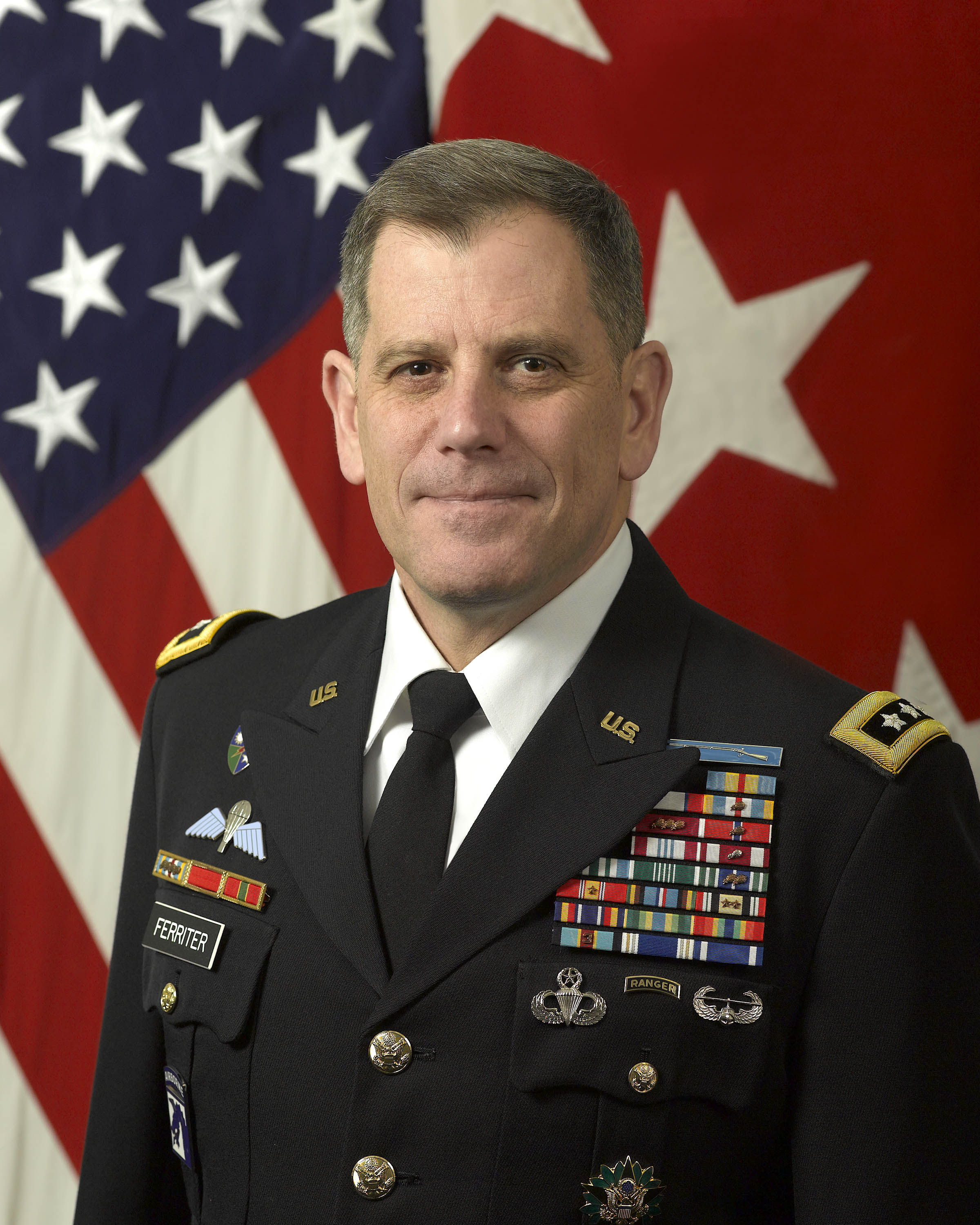
- Military career
- Allegiance: United States of America
- Branch: United States Army
- Service years: 1979 - 2014
- Rank: Lieutenant General
- Commands: United States Army Installation Management Command; United States Army Maneuver Center of Excellence; United States Army Infantry Center; 11th Infantry; 3d Battalion, 75th Ranger Regiment; 2d Battalion, 504th Parachute Infantry
- Conflicts: Operation Restore Hope; Operation Iraqi Freedom; Operation New Dawn
- Awards: Distinguished Service Medal; Defense Superior Service Medal; Legion of Merit; Bronze Star Medal; Defense Meritorious Service Medal; Meritorious Service Medal; Army Commendation Medal

Michael Ferriter is an American retired United States Army Lieutenant General. He served as commanding general of the United States Army Installation Management Command/U.S. Army Assistant Chief of Staff for Installation Management from 2011 until 2014. During his career he has participated in Operation Restore Hope in Somalia, and served three tours of duty in Iraq. On June 19, 2018, he was named president and CEO of the National Veterans Memorial and Museum in Columbus, Ohio.

== Military career ==
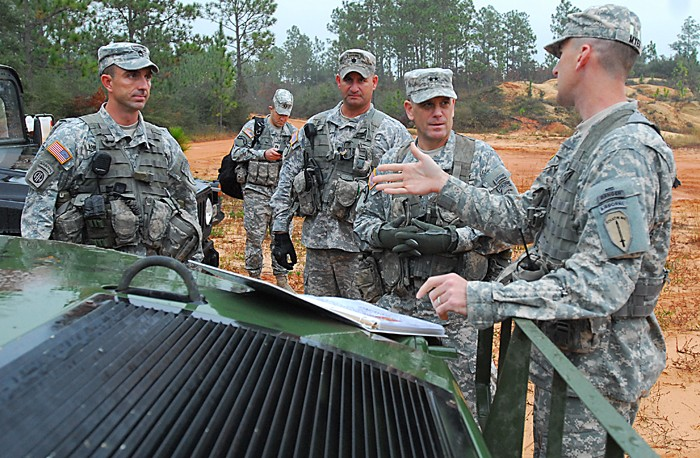
Ferriter, second from right, is briefed on a 10-day field training exercise students undergo in the swamp at Fort Benning, Georgia

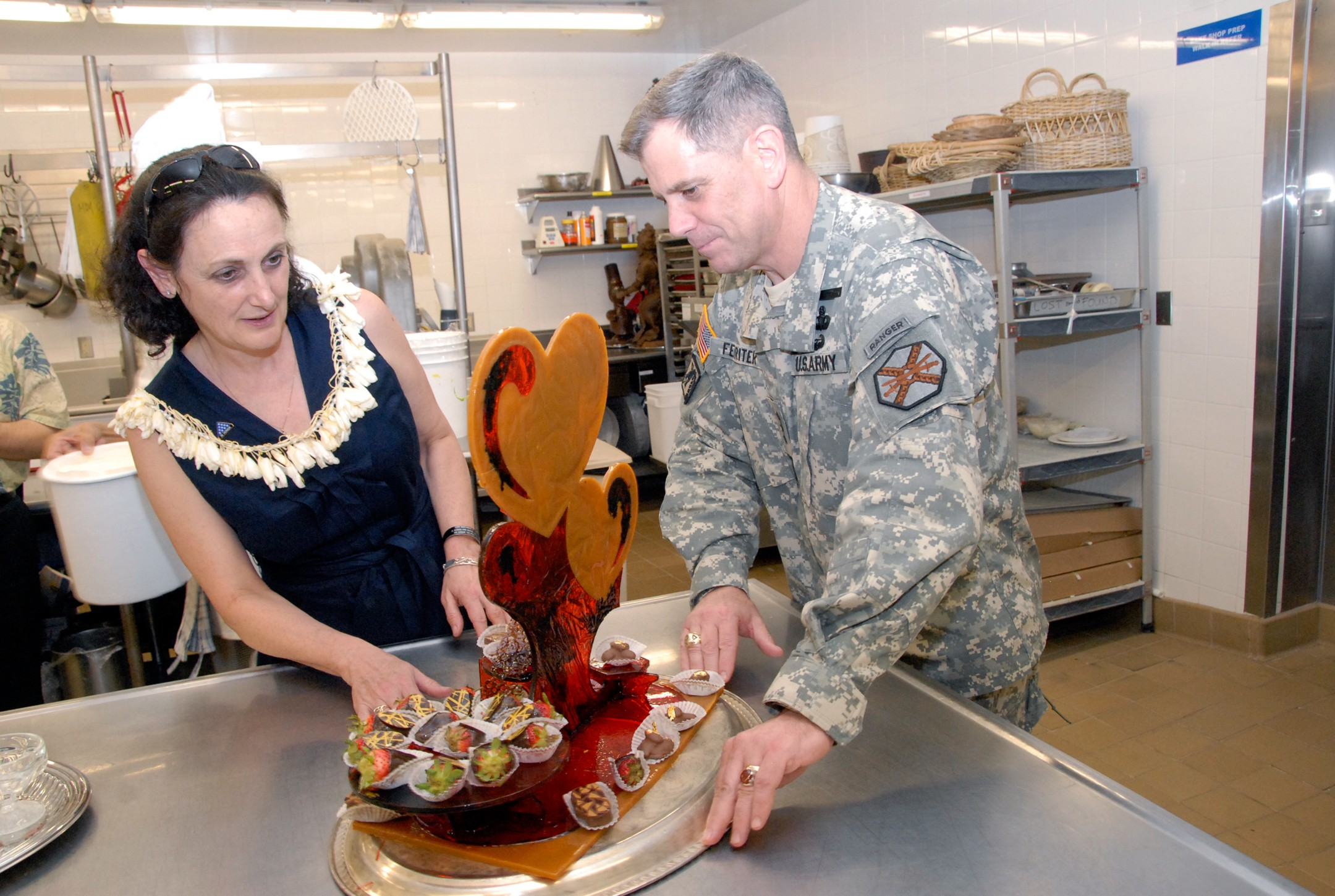
Ferriter and his wife, Margie, admire a table decoration made of pulled sugar at the Hale Koa Hotel at Fort DeRussy, Hawaii.

Ferriter graduated from The Citadel with a Bachelor of Science degree in Business Administration in May 1979, and was commissioned in the infantry as a Second Lieutenant. After the Infantry Officer Basic Course, his first troop assignment was with the 2d Battalion, 16th Infantry, at Fort Riley, Kansas, where he commanded a weapons platoon and a support platoon, and then became S4 (Logistics) on the battalion staff.

After attending the Infantry Officer Advanced Course at Fort Benning, Georgia, from April to October 1983, he became Assistant S3 (Operations) on the staff of the 6th Battalion, 327th Infantry at Fort Wainwright, Alaska, and then commander of its C Company. He was posted to Fort Lewis, Washington, in October 1986, where he was S5 (Civil Military Operations) and then S1 (Personnel) on the staff of the 2nd Battalion, 75th Ranger Regiment, and then commander of its B Company. This was followed in July 1989 by service as S3 (Operations), on the staff of the 4th Battalion, 23d Infantry (Mechanized), which was part of the 9th Infantry Division, but still based at Fort Lewis.

Ferriter attended the United States Army Command and General Staff College at Fort Leavenworth, Kansas, between July 1989 and July 1990. He then became the Regiment S5 (Civil Military Operations) of the 75th Ranger Regiment at Fort Benning. After a time as S3 (Operations), on the staff of the 3d Battalion, he became the Regiment S3 (Operations). In this capacity, he participated in Operation Restore Hope in Somalia. He commanded the 2d Battalion, 504th Parachute Infantry of the 82d Airborne Division at Fort Bragg, North Carolina, from November 1994 to June 1996 and the 3d Battalion, 75th Ranger Regiment at Fort Benning from July 1996 to June 1998.

In August 1998 he became a Senior Service College Fellow at Tufts University's Fletcher School of Law and Diplomacy in Medford, Massachusetts. He assumed command of the 11th Infantry at Fort Benning in July 1991. His first Joint Staff assignment was as deputy director for operations and plans, J3, and then executive assistant to the commander, United States Joint Forces Command, in Norfolk, Virginia. This was followed by duty as assistant division commander (operations) of the 82d Airborne Division at Fort Bragg, North Carolina in June 2004. He then served in Operation Iraqi Freedom as deputy commanding general (operations) of the Multi-National Corps – Iraq, after which he returned to being J-3 of the Joint Forces Command in Norfolk.

Ferriter was deputy commanding general (operations) of the XVIII Airborne Corps at Fort Bragg from August 2007 until January 2008, when he returned to Iraq for a second tour as deputy commanding general (operations) of the Multi-National Corps – Iraq, again returning to duty as deputy commanding general (operations) of the XVIII Airborne Corps at Fort Bragg in April 2009. In June 2009 he became commanding general of the United States Army Infantry Center and commandant of the United States Army Infantry School at Fort Benning. This was followed by duty as commanding general of the United States Army Maneuver Center of Excellence there from October 2009 to November 2010.

From January to October 2011 Ferriter was deputy commander for advising and training of the United States Forces – Iraq as part of Operation New Dawn. From November 2011 until May 2014, he served as assistant chief of staff for installation management and commanding general, United States Army Installation Management Command in Washington, D.C.

== Personal life ==
"The Ferriters are a great Army Family," noted the Chief of Staff of the United States Army, General Raymond T. Odierno "and IMCOM is fortunate to have them". As IMCOM Commander, Ferriter is quoted as saying "Always remember that the strength of our nation is our Army. The strength of our Army is our soldiers. The strength of our soldiers is our Families. And that’s what makes us Army Strong."

== Awards ==
His awards and badges include the Distinguished Service Medal, Defense Superior Service Medal (with Oak Leaf Cluster), Legion of Merit (with 3 Oak Leaf Clusters), Bronze Star Medal (with Oak Leaf Cluster), Defense Meritorious Service Medal, Meritorious Service Medal (with 5 Oak Leaf Clusters), Army Commendation Medal (with Oak Leaf Cluster), Army Achievement Medal (with 2 Oak Leaf Clusters), Expert Infantryman Badge, Master Parachutist Badge, Air Assault Badge, and Ranger Tab.

== Dates of rank ==
Insignia	Rank	Dates	Source
	Second Lieutenant	12 May 1979	
	First Lieutenant	21 February 1981	
	Captain	1 April 1983	
	Major	1 Oct 1990	
	Lieutenant Colonel	1 July 1994	
	Colonel	1 June 1999	
	Brigadier General	1 March 2005	
	Major General	2 October 2008	
	Lieutenant General	5 January 2011	
