= United States Forces – Iraq =

American military unit

- Active: January 1, 2010 – December 15, 2011
- Country: United States
- Size: 112,000 (January 2010)
- Part of: United States Central Command
- Headquarters: Victory Base Complex, Baghdad
- Engagements: Iraq War

Commanders
- Commanding General: Raymond T. Odierno (until September 2010); Lloyd Austin
- Deputy Commanding General: Frank Helmick (until July 2011); Thomas Spoehr
- Command Sergeant Major: Lawrence K. Wilson (until September 2010); Joseph R. Allen
- Notable commanders: Michael D. Barbero

Insignia
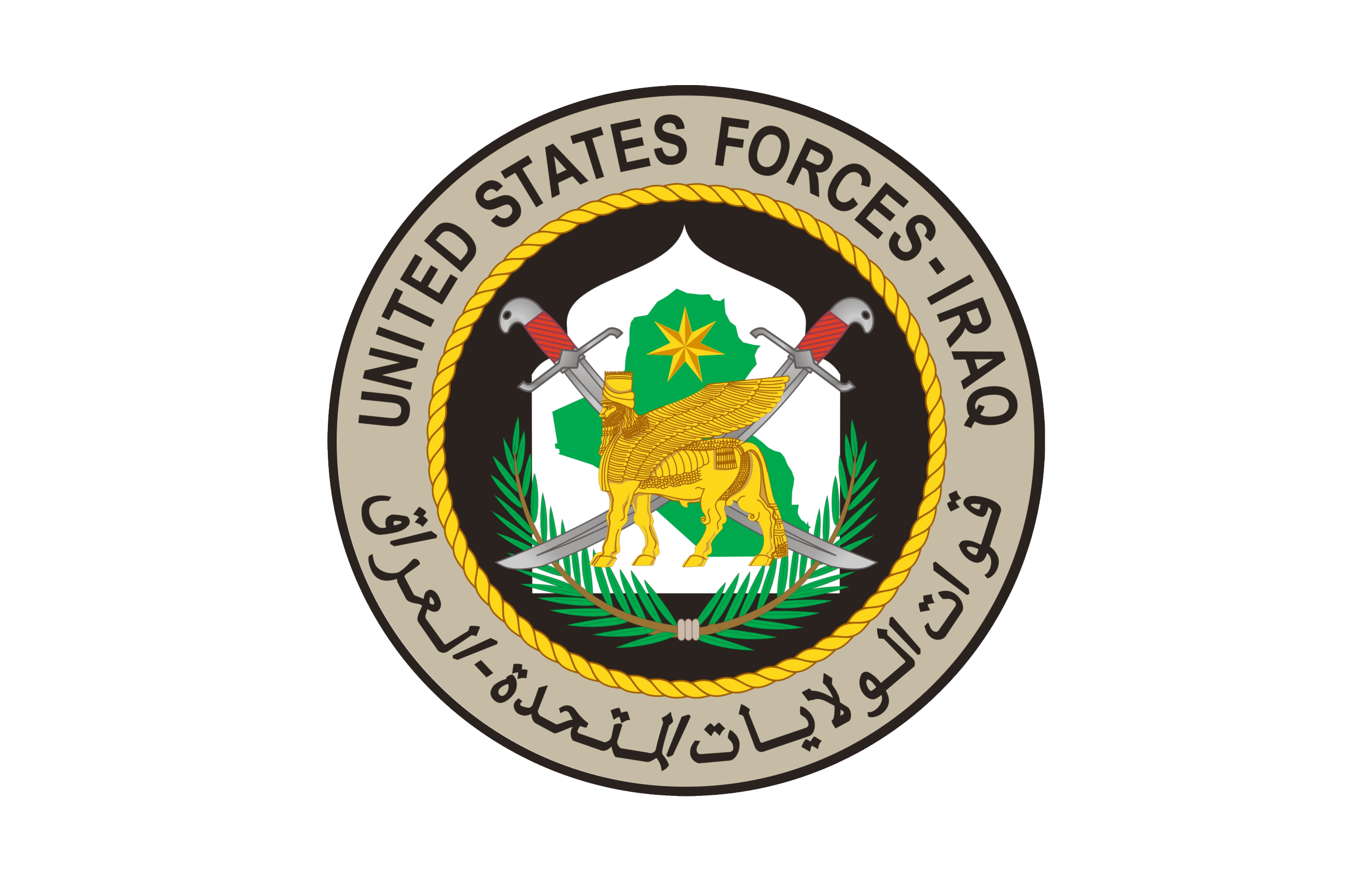
- Flag

The United States Forces – Iraq (USF-I) was a United States military sub-unified command, part of U.S. Central Command. It was stationed in Iraq as agreed with the Government of Iraq under the U.S.–Iraq Status of Forces Agreement. USF–I replaced the previous commands Multi-National Force – Iraq, Multi-National Corps – Iraq, and Multi-National Security Transition Command – Iraq from January 2010. General Raymond T. Odierno initially served as commanding general but he was replaced by General Lloyd Austin in September of 2010. The logo of the USF-I depicts a lamassu.

As of May 2011, all non-U.S. coalition members had withdrawn from Iraq. The vast majority of Department of Defense personnel then withdrew by 18 December 2011. Only 147 DOD personnel remained at the Embassy of the United States, Baghdad.

== Background ==
United States Forces – Iraq was the military component of the American and Iraqi bilateral relationship, responsible for defense and security cooperation. The U.S.–Iraq Strategic Framework Agreement reads:

In order to strengthen security and stability in Iraq, and thereby contribute to international peace and stability, and to enhance the ability of the Republic of Iraq to deter all threats against its sovereignty, security, and territorial integrity, the Parties shall continue to foster close cooperation concerning defense and security arrangements without prejudice to Iraqi sovereignty over its land, sea, and air territory.

The United States occupied Iraq between the toppling of the Ba'athist Iraqi government and the dissolution of the Coalition Provisional Authority on 28 June 2004. Thereafter, the United States remained in Iraq after obtaining United Nations Security Council approvals and resolutions, negotiated with involvement from the Transitional Government of Iraq. On 1 January 2009, the Government of Iraq obtained full responsibility for security in all of Iraq. Consequently, United States Forces – Iraq did not have responsibility for, nor control of, any ground in Iraq. Its mission was limited to defense and security cooperation only.

== History ==
During 2008 and 2009, all non-U.S. foreign forces withdrew from Iraq. Withdrawal of all non-U.S. forces was complete by 31 July 2009. As of 1 January 2009, the Iraqi government became fully responsible, through its security ministries, for maintaining and providing security and rule of law for its populace. Furthermore, as of 28 June 2009, no foreign forces were stationed within any of Iraq's major cities. The United States decided after negotiations to cease combat operations, that is, patrolling, serving arrest warrants, route clearance, etc., within Iraq by 1 September 2010, and to transition to an advisory, training and assistance role. The changing mission entailed major troop reductions. Numbers dropped from 115,000 on 15 December 2009, to 50,000 by 1 September 2010, and to zero by 31 December 2011.

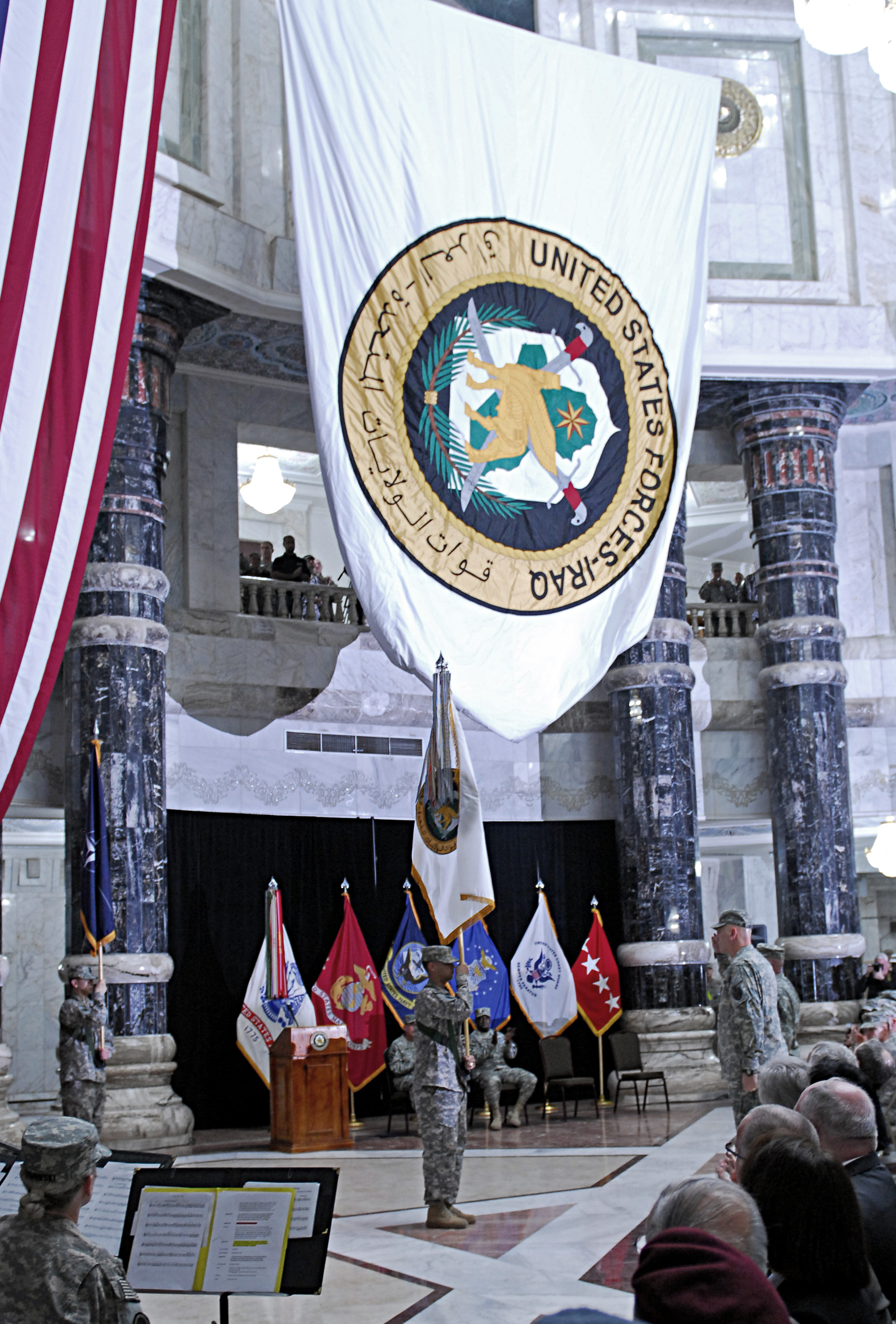
General Ray Odierno of the U.S. Army salutes the newly unfurled USF–I flag during the command's activation ceremony in January 2010.

Multi-National Force – Iraq, Multi-National Corps – Iraq and Multi-National Security Transition Command – Iraq) were merged together on 1 January 2010. The streamlining reduced the total number of staff positions by 41%, and serves the new advise, train and assist role of the U.S. forces under the U.S.–Iraq Strategic Framework Agreement. The reduced number of staff positions decreased the personnel requirements on the United States armed forces. This also meant that further space was created for the reconstitution of the U.S. military after the end of significant combat operations. (This reconstitution may include, for example, longer leave for many personnel, enhanced space for psychological counselling, equipment repair and maintenance, transport of enormous amounts of equipment, supplies, and materiel south to Kuwait and onward, reconsideration of requirements, etc.).

The new USF–I was claimed to be organized into three divisions, which as of January 2010 were actually four. United States Division – North took over from the former MND–N, United States Division – Center takes over from United States Force – West and MND–Baghdad, amalgamated on 23 January 2010, and United States Division – South, took over from the old MND–South. In December 2009-January 2010 when the transition occurred, the 34th Infantry Division was providing the headquarters of MND/USD South. On 3 February 2010, the 1st Infantry Division took command of USD–South (covering nine Governorates of Iraq, including Wasit Governorate and Babil Governorate) from the 34th Infantry Division. A number of Advise and Assist (A&A) Brigades were created to carry out the Advise and Assist mission. Advise and Assist brigades were "standard combat brigades with a complement of forty-eight extra majors and colonels to serve as advisers to Iraqi troops."

MNSTC–I became U.S. Forces – Iraq, Advising and Training, which was under a major general (Jane's Defence Weekly, January 2010), double-hatted as Commander, NATO Training Mission – Iraq (NTM–I).

=== Withdrawals ===
- 1 January 2009 – The U.S.–Iraq Status of Forces Agreement went into effect, and gave the Government of Iraq de jure responsibility of maintaining and providing security for all of its people. Approximately 150,000 foreign troops in Iraq.
- 28 June 2009 – Foreign forces were no longer stationed within any of Iraq's major cities. Proclaimed as a national holiday by Iraqi Prime Minister Nouri al-Maliki.
- 31 July 2009 – The last large groups of non-U.S. foreign forces completed their withdrawal from Iraq.
- 1 January 2010 – The major commands Multi-National Force – Iraq, Multi-National Corps – Iraq and Multi-National Security Transition Command – Iraq merged into the unified command United States Forces – Iraq, reducing the total number of staff positions by 41%. Approximately 112,000 U.S. troops in Iraq.
- 7 March 2010 – Iraq held parliamentary elections, its second under its democratic constitution, and is seen as an important milestone for the young Iraqi political system; this leaves approximately 96,000 U.S. troops in Iraq.
- 1 September 2010 – American forces ceased all combat operations, i.e. patrolling, serving arrest warrants, route clearance, etc., and transitioned to a pure advise, train and assist role. Operation Iraqi Freedom is officially concluded, and the advise and assist mission continues under Operation New Dawn. 49,700 U.S. troops in Iraq.
- 31 December 2011 – U.S. Army and U.S. Marine Corps units and formations complete their withdrawal from Iraq. All security responsibilities were then assumed by the Iraqi Armed Forces and other security agencies, including the Ministry of Interior. The Office of Security Cooperation - Iraq, part of the larger Embassy of the United States, Baghdad held the remaining DOD support personnel, totalling about 1,000 contractors and about 147 DOD uniformed personnel. It operated from ten locations around Iraq, and managed about 370 Foreign Military Sales cases, totaling more than US $9 billion of pending arms sales, citing a February 2012 Congressional Research Service report; training; and follow-on support functions. The biggest program underway was the much-delayed sale of 18 Lockheed Martin F-16 Fighting Falcon fighters.
