= Abdul Salaam Alizai =

Abdul Salaam Alizai عبدالسلام علیزی
- Other name: Mullah
- Occupation: Military Commander
- Known for: Former member of the Taliban movement and leader of the Alizai
- Notable work: In the 1980s, Mullah Abdul Salaam Alizai was part of the resistance Against the Soviets. Abdul Salaam Alizai is a former member of the Taliban movement who defected to the Afghan government in December 2007.

Mullah Abdul Salaam Alizai is a former member of the Taliban movement who defected to the Afghan government in December 2007. He is a leader of the Alizai, a Pashtun tribe.

In the 1980s, Mullah Abdul Salaam took part in the resistance against the Soviets. During the Taliban rule of Afghanistan, he was a military commander, and held the posts of governor of Orūzgān Province, and later district governor of Kajaki. He was said to be on good terms with Taliban leader Mullah Omar.

After the demise of the Taliban regime in 2001, Mullah Abdul Salaam returned to a civilian life but was later imprisoned by the governor of Helmand province Sher Mohammed Akhundzada for eight months. The two men both belong to the Alizai tribe, but are from rival sub-tribes. Eventually, they reconciled and Mullah Salaam served as head of Sher Mohammed's security detail, but the enmity between sub-tribes has not abated. Mullah Salaam later returned to his home town of Musa Qala to become a member of the local tribal council.

In mid-June 2006, as part of the Helmand province campaign, ISAF troops were deployed to Musa Qala, where they came under heavy attack by Taliban elements. In October 2006, both forces agreed to withdraw from the town, but in February 2007, the Taliban returned and seized control of Musa Qala. Mullah Salaam claimed that when the Taliban convened a Shura (council) to attack the ISAF, he refused to participate. However, during the Taliban takeover of February 2007, he is said to have led his tribal force in support of the Taliban. Later, he began negotiations with an Irish diplomat working for the European Union who persuaded him to join the government. In the autumn of 2007, Mullah Salaam travelled to Kabul where he met President Hamid Karzai and persuaded him that he could provoke a tribal uprising against the Taliban. Upon his return, he was soon arrested by the Taliban and taken for further prosecutions to the court where he fought with his barehands and used their weapons against them while on his way to the court. He was supported by a tribal uprising against the Taliban where coalition and Afghan commanders then planned Operation Mar Kardad to recapture Musa Qala from the Taliban. The offensive began on December 7, 2007. However, once coalition troops had driven away the Taliban, he was appointed governor of Musa Qala District.

Having rallied to the government, he became a target for the Taliban. In January 2008, a suicide bomber injured several of his bodyguards.

After June 2008, his relations with the British appear to have significantly degraded. He accused British soldiers of undermining his authority by releasing people he had imprisoned and refusing to fund his "war chest", which he claims is for buying the support of Taliban commanders. In response, the British have accused him of concerning himself only with his own profit, and neglecting the reconstruction of Musa Qala. They have also charged that he has been taxing the illegal opium poppy crop, while his militia is said to have engaged in thievery and extortion. Mullah Salaam has denied the charges.

On January 1, 2009, Taliban militants attacked his house in the village of Shah Kariz, killing 20 of his bodyguards, but Salaam was absent at the time, and escaped injury.
