= Alizai (Pashtun tribe) =

Durrani Pashtun tribe

Alizai or Alizay (Pashto: علیزی) is a Pashtun tribe in southwestern and central Afghanistan. It belongs to the Panjpai confederation of the larger Durrani tribe of Ahmad Shah Durrani. Qadyr Alizai, an entrepreneur and economist in Kabul, is the chief. Their heartland is Zamindawar, north of Helmand province. They primarily inhabit the Musa Qala district.

== Geographic distribution ==
In 2007, Alizai tribesmen in the village of Musa Qala in Helmand province united under Mullah Abdul Salam and fought alongside the Taliban. Mullah Abdul Salam later agreed to change sides and was appointed by President Hamid Karzai as the governor of Musa Qala district.

== Notable people ==
- Sardar Ahmed Nawaz Khan Alizai - Tribal chief of the Alizai tribe in Balochistan, Pakistan
- Sardar Shahzaman Khan Alizai - Politician Mastung, Balochistan
- Malik Saleem Khan Alizai - Tehsildar Mastung, Balochistan
- Muhammad Waseem Alizai - Pakistani professional boxer
- Abdul Salaam Alizai – Governor of Uruzgan
- Ahmadullah Alizai – Governor of Badghis and Kabul
- Zubayr 'Ali Za'i - Renowned Islamic Scholar From Pakistan

== See also ==
- Ishakzai
