= Michael D. Barbero =

United States Army general

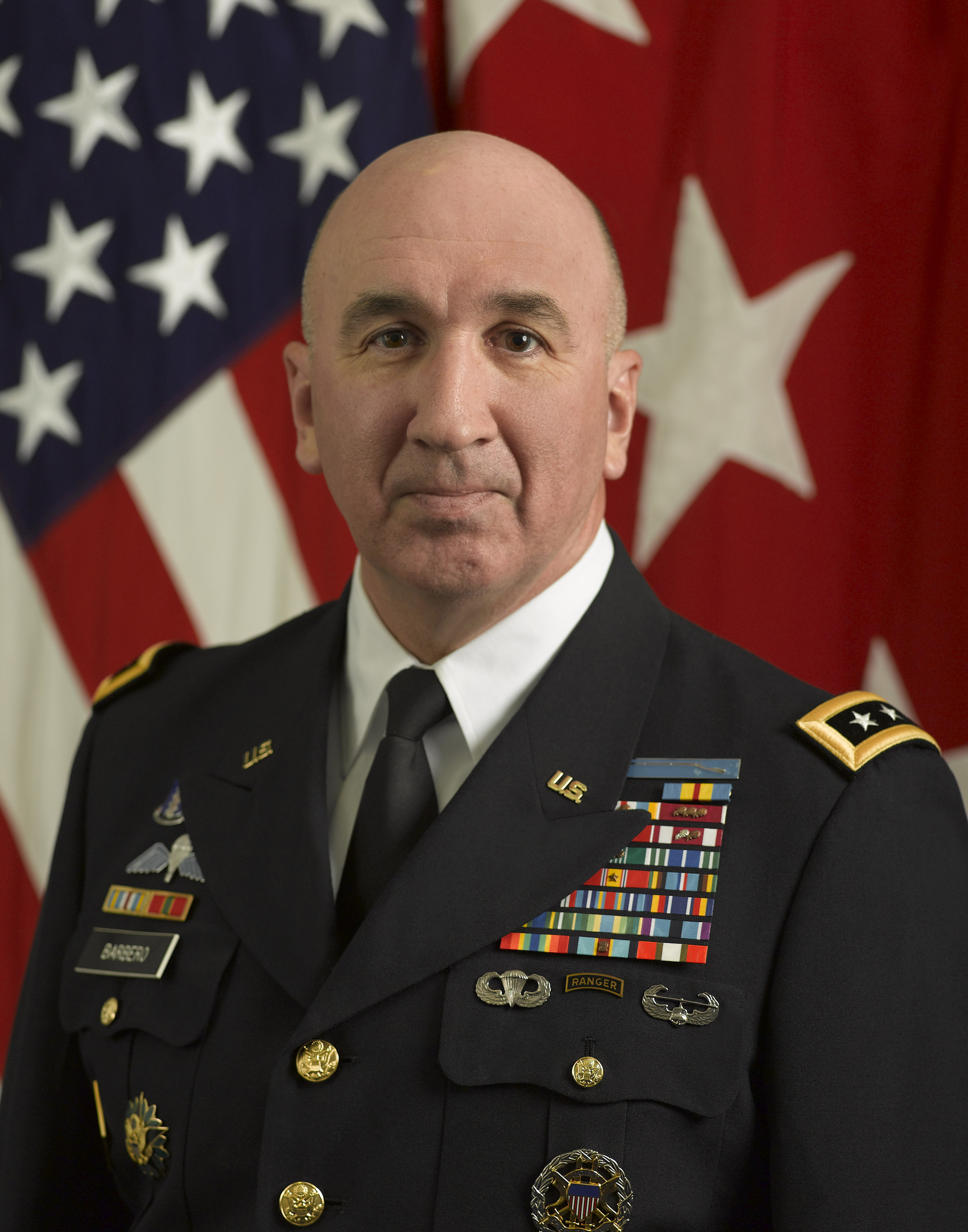
- Born: September 14, 1953 (age 73); West Germany
- Military career
- Allegiance: United States
- Branch: United States Army
- Service years: 1976–2013
- Rank: Lieutenant general
- Commands: Joint Improvised Explosive Device Defeat Organization; U.S. Army's Joint Readiness Training Center and Fort Polk; United States Army Infantry Center and Fort Benning; Multi-National Security Transition Command – Iraq; NATO Training Mission – Iraq
- Conflicts: Operation Iraqi Freedom; Operation Enduring Freedom; Operation Just Cause; New Dawn
- Awards: Defense Superior Service Medal (with Oak Leaf Cluster); Legion of Merit (with 3 Oak Leaf Cluster)

Michael Douglas Barbero (born September 14, 1953) is a former United States Army officer who now works as a consultant.

== Early life and education ==
Born in West Germany in 1953, Barbero was commissioned in the infantry upon graduation from the United States Military Academy at West Point with a B.S. degree in 1976. He holds a master's degree in national security and strategic studies from the National Defense University, Washington, D.C. Barbero is also a graduate of the U.S. Army's Command and General Staff College and the School of Advanced Military Studies Program.

== Career ==
Lieutenant General Michael D. Barbero served as Director, Joint Improvised Explosive Device Defeat Organization (JIEDDO) from March 2011 until May 2013. In this post, he was responsible for leading the Defense Department's actions to rapidly provide counter-IED capabilities in support of combatant commanders, military services and other federal agencies to enable the defeat of the IED as a weapon of strategic influence.

Following his commissioning as an infantry officer in 1976, Lieutenant General Barbero served in a variety of tactical assignments in mechanized, light and air assault infantry units. He served in the 1st Cavalry Division, 2d Infantry Division, two tours in the 101st Airborne Division, the 7th Infantry Division, the 10th Mountain Division and the 4th Infantry Division.

In addition to infantry assignments at the tactical level, he commanded at every grade, from lieutenant colonel to lieutenant general. He commanded the 3d Battalion, 187th Infantry Battalion in the 101st Airborne Division and the 2d Brigade, 10th Mountain Division. As a brigadier general, he commanded one of the Army's combat training centers, the Joint Readiness Training Center and Fort Polk, Louisiana. As a major general, he commanded the United States Army Infantry Center and Fort Benning, Georgia. Immediately prior to joining JIEDDO, he commanded the Multi-National Security Transition Command–Iraq and NATO Training Mission–Iraq.

Other staff assignments included service as the executive assistant to the commander of Joint Forces Command/Supreme Allied Commander Atlantic, the Deputy Director for Regional Operations on the Joint Staff and the Chief of Staff, III Corps and Fort Hood, Texas, Austin.

Lieutenant General Barbero served nearly four years in Iraq over three separate tours. During the first year of Operation Iraqi Freedom, from 2003 to 2004, he served as the assistant division commander of the 4th Infantry Division. He next served in Iraq as the Deputy Chief of Staff, Strategic Operations at Multi-National Force – Iraq during "the surge" in 2007 and 2008. Finally, during his most recent deployment, from 2009 to January 2011, he was responsible for the training, equipping and development of all Iraqi security forces and building the ministerial capabilities of both the Ministries of Interior and Defense, while serving simultaneously as the Commander of Multi-National Security Transition Command - Iraq and the Commander of the NATO Training Mission - Iraq. He also deployed to Panama and participated in Operation Just Cause in December 1989.

=== Consulting ===
Barbero has worked as a consultant for Ironhand Security, Intelligent Decisions Systems and Jones Group International. He has worked as a paid advisor to the Saudi, Kuwaiti and Libyan governments.

== Awards and decorations ==
Expert Infantryman Badge
Basic Parachutist Badge
Ranger Tab
Air Assault Badge
Joint Chiefs of Staff Identification Badge
Army Staff Identification Badge
4th Infantry Division Combat Service Identification Badge
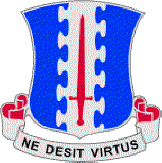
187th Infantry Regiment Distinctive Unit Insignia
Australian Parachutist Badge
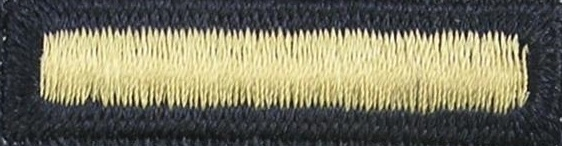
8 Overseas Service Bars

Defense Distinguished Service Medal
Army Distinguished Service Medal
Defense Superior Service Medal with one bronze oak leaf cluster
Legion of Merit with three oak leaf clusters
Bronze Star Medal with oak leaf cluster
Meritorious Service Medal with one silver and one bronze oak leaf clusters
Army Commendation Medal with oak leaf cluster
Army Achievement Medal
Army Good Conduct Medal
Joint Meritorious Unit Award with oak leaf cluster
Superior Unit Award
National Defense Service Medal with one bronze service star
Armed Forces Expeditionary Medal with service star
Iraq Campaign Medal with two service stars
Global War on Terrorism Expeditionary Medal
Global War on Terrorism Service Medal
Korea Defense Service Medal
Armed Forces Service Medal
Humanitarian Service Medal
Army Service Ribbon
Army Overseas Service Ribbon with bronze award numeral 2
NATO Meritorious Service Medal
NATO Medal for Service with ISAF
Multinational Force and Observers Medal
National Order of Merit (France), Knight

== See also ==
- Operation Enduring Freedom
- Operation Iraqi Freedom
- Operation New Dawn
- War on terror
- Joint Improvised Explosive Device Defeat Organization
- United States Army Joint Readiness Training Center and Fort Polk
- United States Army Infantry Center and Fort Benning
- Multi-National Security Transition Command – Iraq
- NATO Training Mission – Iraq
