= Coalition Military Assistance Training Team =

The Coalition Military Assistance Training Team (CMATT) was a part of the Coalition Provisional Authority created to organize, train and equip the Iraqi Army from 2003. It later became part of Multi-National Security Transition Command - Iraq (MNSTC-I). CMATT had initial plans to stand up nine infantry brigades in three divisions, a coastal defense force, and lay the framework of an aviation arm of the military.

Among CMATT's goals were developing a force that was:

- under political control,
- accountable to the nation, and
- defensive in capability

Additionally, CMATT advisors established (or reestablished) Iraqi Army Infantry, logistics, administration, medical services, signals, and military police schools.

On June 25, 2003, the U.S. Army, acting on behalf of the CPA, awarded the Vinnell Corporation a $48.0 million "cost plus fixed fee" contract to train the first nine battalions, or 9,000 recruits, of a 44,000 person-strong New Iraq Corps, which quickly became the "New Iraqi Army". Separately, a $30.0 million task order was issued under the existing Logistics Civil Augmentation Program for logistical support to the NIA training program.

CMATT's main recruiting stations were located in Baghdad, Basra and Mosul. The most desired recruits were those who had prior military service or are skilled in specific professions such as first aid, heavy equipment operation, food service and truck driving. "In the early phases of the effort, it took CMATT 1,000 recruits to produce an active battalion of 757 soldiers." Soldier fallout usually occurred due to voluntary withdrawal or failure to meet training standards.

Due to the demand for the initial battalions to become active as soon as possible, the first four battalions' officers, non-commissioned officers, and enlisted soldiers are being trained simultaneously (in separate groups). By late January 2004 training for the enlisted soldiers of the first three battalions had been completed. Notable differences in training between CMATT and former training under Saddam's regime include schooling in human rights, the laws of land warfare, and tolerance in a multi-ethnic team.

Based on the philosophy used by the U.S. military to boost its own size in response to World War II — that an army can be built faster by focusing on the training on its leadership rather than enlisted soldiers — CMATT pursued a similar strategy of focusing recruitment and training on commissioned and non-commissioned officers for the remaining 23 Iraqi battalions. Upon successful completion of officer training, these groups of officers were intended to form the battalion's leadership cadre, which would then be responsible, under CMATT, for overseeing its own recruitment, training, and readiness of its enlisted men. It was hoped that having the Iraqi leadership train its own will overcome problems faced by CMATT's training process; namely recruitment, desertion, and unit loyalty.

In 2004, a small Air Cell was established within the CMATT, made up of coalition officers, to guide the creation of the reborn Iraqi Air Force. Advisory Support Teams were formed at Basra, Kirkuk, Taji, and Talil to build capacity within the new Iraqi air units.

== Dissolution ==
CMATT was dissolved after the establishment of MNSTC-I in June–July 2004. The initial aim for the New Iraqi Army, of developing U.S. style mechanized divisions to defend the country from invasion from its surrounding neighbors, had to change to developing the necessary security forces to protect the Iraqi population from the Iraqi insurgency. It was replaced with the Coalition Army Advisory Training Team.

The Air Cell was replaced, as part of MNSTC-I, with the Coalition Air Force Transition Team, established on 18 November 2005.
