= 197th Infantry Brigade (United States) =

- Shoulder sleeve insignia
- Active: 24 June 1921–29 September 1945 (various designations); 25 March 1948–1 August 1961; 1 August 1962–16 August 1991 (197th Infantry Bge.); 9 November 2006–11 December 2013; 31 July 2020–present
- Country: United States
- Branch: United States Army
- Type: Infantry
- Role: Training
- Size: Brigade (1,900) Mobilization(5,000-7,000)
- Part of: Maneuver Center of Excellence
- Garrison/HQ: Fort Benning, Georgia
- Nickname: Sledgehammer / (special designation) "FOLLOW ME"
- Decorations: World War II; Rhineland; Ardennes-Alsace; Central Europe; Southwest Asia; Defense of Saudi Arabia; Liberation and Defense of Kuwait

Commanders
- Current commander: Col. Christopher Hallows
- Command Sergeant Major: CSM Blake A. Simms
- Notable commanders: COL Theodore "Ted" Reid, Desert Shield/Desert Storm; General William W. Hartzog, about 1985-1987; LTG Carmen J. Cavezza, 1981–1983; LTG Michael Spigelmire, late 1970s BG Edwin L. Kennedy, 1971-1973; MG William B. Steele, 1973–1974; COL Jack L. Treadwell, 1966–1968

Insignia
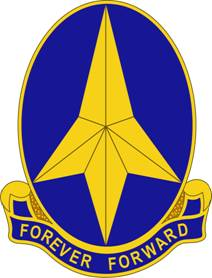
- Distinctive unit insignia

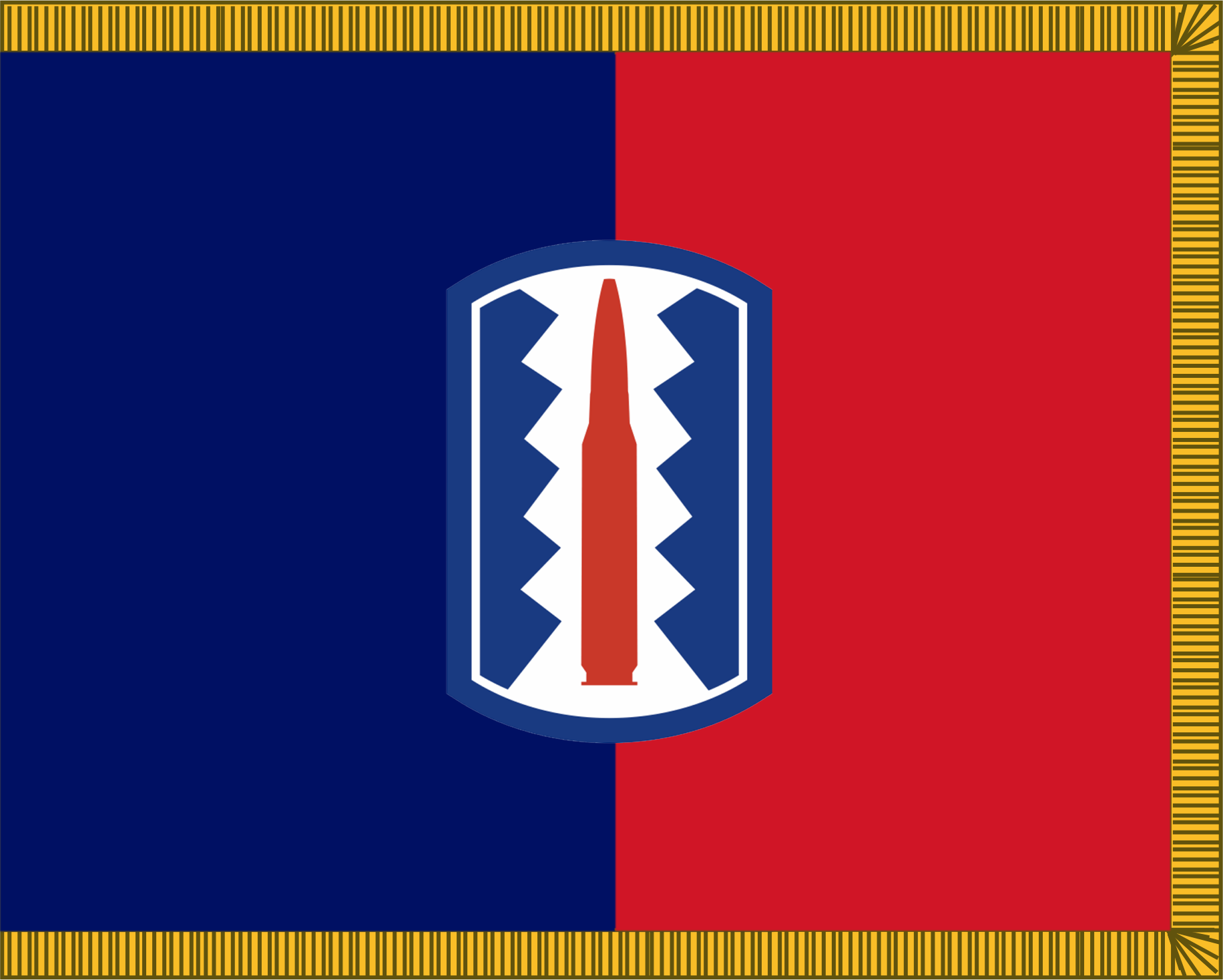
- 197th Infantry Brigade Flag

The 197th Infantry Brigade ("Sledgehammer" / "FOLLOW ME") is an active Infantry brigade of the United States Army. The brigade was active as an Organized Reserve unit from 1921 to 1942, in the Regular Army from 1962 to 1991, and as a TRADOC training unit from 2007 to 2013. The brigade saw service in Operation Desert Storm with the 24th Infantry Division. On July 31, 2020, the brigade was activated as a training brigade in Fort Benning, Georgia, to serve the increased training needs of the army.

== History ==
For the new Reorganization Objective Army Division (ROAD) brigade at Fort Benning, Georgia, the adjutant general on 1 August 1962 restored elements of the 99th Reconnaissance Troop, which thirty years earlier had been organized by consolidating infantry brigade headquarters and headquarters companies of the 99th Infantry Division, as Headquarters and Headquarters Companies, 197th and 198th Infantry Brigades. The following month the 197th Infantry Brigade was activated at Fort Benning. When the Third U.S. Army activated the brigade to support training at the Infantry Center, it consisted of a composite artillery battalion (105-mm. and 155-mm. howitzers and Honest Johns), an armor battalion, a mechanized infantry battalion, two infantry battalions, an engineer company, and a chemical platoon, but no support battalion. At some point, a support battalion was organized. The support battalion was composed of A company, the brigade administration company; B company was a medical company providing medics for training event; C company was the brigade supply company, and D company was a transportation company. The battalion was composed mostly of soldiers returning from Viet Nam having only several months to serve on active duty. Colonel Dorchek was the Support Battalion Commander. A company consisted of the Brigade Chaplains, Brigade Adjutant General section, and the Brigade Judge Advocate General Section. A company also contained the battalion consolidated mess hall. A company was commanded 1969-1970 by Captain Terrence Rudes and the First Sergeant was John A. Hoyt. In 1969, Colonel Willard Latham assumed command of the 197th Brigade. He later became the Post Commander at Ft. Benning. COL Edwin L. Kennedy succeeded COL Latham in command in an unusual coincidence. LTC Kennedy had succeeded LTC Latham in battalion command in Berlin, Germany in 1968. This was COL Kennedy's second brigade command having commanded the 196th Light Infantry Brigade in Vietnam previously. The strength of the brigade was approximately 3,500 men.

In late 1965 an infantry battalion of the 197th Infantry Brigade was inactivated at Fort Benning to provide personnel for expanding the Army in Vietnam. In early 1973, to provide personnel needed for the Infantry School, Continental Army Command directed that the school support troops be reorganized and the 197th be restructured as a unit in the Strategic Army Force. On 21 March 1973 the brigade officially joined the strategic force, fielding one battalion each of infantry, mechanized infantry, and armor.

The intent of this reorganization at the time was that the brigade would align with XVIIIth Corps possible contingency assignment to potential Middle East situations. If activated, the brigade would be the Corps heavy force element. It was also understood that the brigade would become as a longer-term objective, though remaining at Ft, Benning, a divisional maneuver brigade of a mechanized division that would at some point activate at Ft. Stewart, Georgia. The division that would form was believed at the time to be the 24th Mechanized Division.

An aggressive brigade training and validation by Forces Command followed the new mission assignment for the brigade. It included many joint exercises and other deployments locally at Ft. Benning in support of Infantry Center missions that were part of a massive Army modernization that was initiating.

The Infantry Center missions along with the aggressive reorganization and training program relative to the new mission orientation of the brigade saw deployments such as the following. As part of the XVIIIth Corps mission, the brigade deployed as a brigade or as subordinate formations to MacGregor Range, New Mexico, Fort Stewart, Georgia and Eglin Air Force Base, Florida and participation in XVIIIth Corps CPXs at Fort Bragg, North Carolina, The brigade also made demanding deployments to Infantry Center missions. As examples the brigade's 3rd Battalion, 7th Infantry deployed a detachment for four months of first 69, then after an extensive machine-gun gunnery period, 49 soldiers in support of the Squad Automatic Weapons Test administered by the U.S. Army Infantry Board in 1974 for four months. The 1st Battalion (Mechanized), 58th Infantry, almost immediately after their return from a month long gunnery and maneuver training density at McGregor Range, New Mexico, deployed Companies A and B for six months in support of Mechanized Infantry Combat Vehicle (MICV) Tests 1 & 2, what became the Bradley Infantry Fighting Vehicle in 1976.

Company A, with three tank sections from the 2nd Battalion 69th Armor (7 tanks) under operational control reconfigured for the Multiple Integrated Laser Engagement System (MiILES) using test battle scenarios that collected the digitized engagement data as a Soviet Motorized Rifle Battalion. Company B configure as a U.S. mechanized force using both M113s and MICVs. These and other support missions by the brigade and its soldiers made major contributions to the Army's then massive modernization effort in progress that would continue through the 1990s.

One scenario of the MICV Test at Turrentine Range and Company A's performance of a Soviet armored attack may have played a role in the ultimate production Bradley M2 acquiring the tube-launched, optically tracked, wire-guided missile (TOW) launcher installed on the vehicle's turret. A significant development supported by the work of the two 1st Battalion, 58th Infantry companies.

Also important and in keeping with larger Army objectives at this time was a major National Guard partnership training mission with a sister Tennessee National Guard mechanized brigade. This mission continued for a year until the Tennessee brigade reorganized as armored cavalry. This activity involved companies for example of the 58th Infantry hand-receipting the companies M113s to the sister mechanized company from Tennessee and then administering the Army Training and Evaluation Program (ARTEP) to the company during their summer active training (AT).

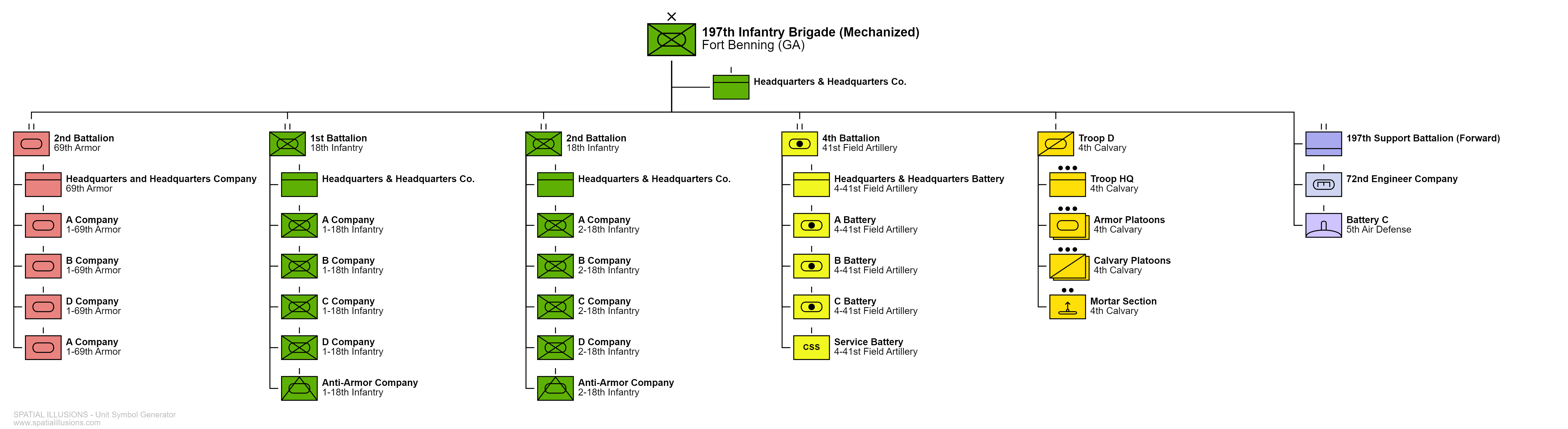
197th Infantry Brigade (Mechanized) Organization 1989

Primarily garrisoned at Kelley Hill Barracks at Fort Benning, the brigade with the extensive mission orientation outlined to not only support the Infantry Center and School but also to specialize in desert, jungle and urban warfare and support other aligned missions as assigned, generally aligned with XVIIIth Airborne Corps contingencies, assured a very active brigade program. Eventually, the 197th Infantry Brigade (Mechanized) (Separate), a stand-alone heavy brigade, would deploy for active combat operations and in the Middle East.

During the Gulf War (Desert Storm) the brigade ultimately served as part of the 24th Mechanized Division based at Fort Stewart, Georgia as the division's third brigade. Soldiers in the 197th who are veterans of the Gulf War wear as their combat patch the patch of the 197th, not the 24th. However, The Institute of Heraldry has not yet minted a combat service identification badge (CSIB) for the 197th.

The 197th was inactivated within months of returning from the war, and its units reflagged as the 3rd Brigade, 24th Infantry Division. The motto of the 197th is "Sledgehammer" and the unit is unofficially known as the "$1.97" (the "dollar ninety-seven"), the "Buck and Change", and the "Bite the Bullet" brigade.

Reactivated in 2007 at Fort Benning, GA as part of TRADOC, the brigade "access(ed) and train(ed) Soldiers and Infantry leaders, demonstrate(ed) Infantry tactics, provide(ed) subject matter expertise, develop(ed) doctrine and support(ed) the USAIS in order to provide the army with soldiers and leaders prepared to fight and win."

The 197th Infantry Brigade was inactivated on 13 December 2013 in order that the U.S. Army would reach manning goals through reductions in the force.

On July 31, 2020, the brigade was activated as a Training Brigade at Ft. Benning, GA.

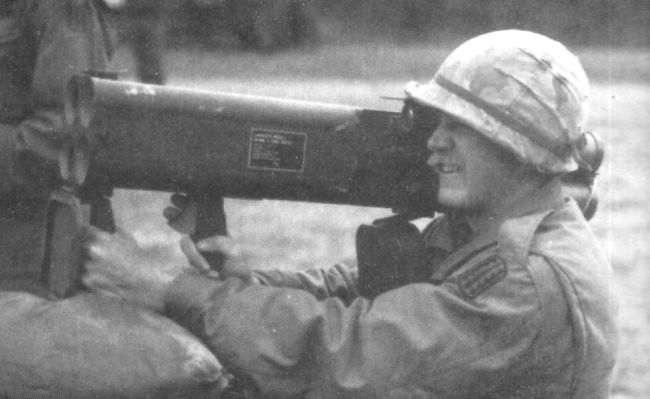

== Organization ==
=== 1968–1978 ===
- Headquarters and Headquarters Company (HHC)
- 3rd Battalion, 7th Infantry
- 1st Battalion (Mechanized), 58th Infantry
- 2nd Battalion, 69th Armor
- Troop A, 15th Cavalry
- 72nd Engineer Company (Combat)
- 2nd Battalion, 10th Field Artillery
- 298th Signal Platoon (Detachment)
- 179th Military Intelligence Detachment
- 197th Military Police Platoon
- 197th Support Battalion
- 197th Aviation Platoon (Detachment)
- 197th Infantry Brigade Replacement Detachment
- 183rd Chemical Platoon

=== 1979–1987 ===
- Headquarters and Headquarters Company
- 3rd Battalion, 7th Infantry
- 1st Battalion (Mechanized), 58th Infantry
- 2nd Battalion, 69th Armor
- 5th Battalion, 82nd Field Artillery
- Troop A, 15th Cavalry
- 72nd Engineer Company (Combat)
- 179th Military Intelligence Detachment
- 187th Pathfinder Platoon

=== 1987-Gulf War ===
During Operation Desert Storm, the brigade was composed of:

- Headquarters and Headquarters Company
- 1st Battalion, 18th Infantry
- 2nd Battalion, 18th Infantry
- 2nd Battalion, 69th Armored
- 4th Battalion, 41st Field Artillery
- Battery C, 1st Battalion, 5th Air Defense Artillery
  - 3rd Squad, 4th Platoon, Battery A, 1st Battalion, 5th Air Defense Artillery (attached)
- 197th Support Battalion
- 72nd Engineer Company
- Troop D, 4th Cavalry

=== TRADOC 2007–2013 ===
When activated under TRADOC in 2007, the brigade consisted of:

- Headquarters and Headquarters Company
- 1st Battalion, 29th Infantry Regiment
  - US Army Infantry Experimental Forces Company
  - Bradley Master Gunner Course
  - Mechanized Leader Course
  - Stryker Leader & Transition Courses
  - Stryker/Bradley Proponent Office
  - Mechanized New Equipment Training Company
- 2nd Battalion, 29th Infantry Regiment
  - Small Arms Ranges, Experimentation and Support
  - Sniper School
  - Combatives School
- CONUS Replacement Center (CRC)

=== TRADOC 2020– ===
When activated under TRADOC in 2020, the brigade consisted of:

- Headquarters and Headquarters Company

- 1st Battalion, 46th Infantry Regiment (BCT)

- 2nd Battalion, 29th Infantry Regiment (OSUT)

- 2nd Battalion, 47th Infantry Regiment (OSUT)

- 3rd Battalion, 47th Infantry Regiment (OSUT)

- 3rd Battalion, 54th Infantry Regiment (OSUT)

== Lineage and honors ==
=== Lineage ===
- Constituted 24 June 1921 in the Organized Reserves as Headquarters and Headquarters Company, 197th Infantry Brigade, and assigned to the 99th Division
- Organized in November 1921 at Pittsburgh, Pennsylvania
- Redesignated 23 March 1924 as Headquarters and Headquarters Company, 197th Brigade
- Redesignated 24 August 1936 as Headquarters and Headquarters Company, 197th Infantry Brigade
- Converted and redesignated 12 February 1942 as the 99th Reconnaissance Troop (less 3d Platoon), 99th Division (Headquarters and Headquarters Company, 198th Infantry Brigade, concurrently converted and redesignated as the 3d Platoon, 99th Reconnaissance Troop, 99th Division)
- Troop ordered into active military service 15 November 1942 and reorganized at Camp Van Dorn, Mississippi, as the 99th Cavalry Reconnaissance Troop, an element of the 99th Infantry Division
- Reorganized and redesignated 2 August 1943 as the 99th Reconnaissance Troop, Mechanized
- Inactivated 29 September 1945 at Camp Myles Standish, Massachusetts

(Organized Reserves redesignated 25 March 1948 as the Organized Reserve Corps; redesignated 9 July 1952 as the Army Reserve)

- Converted and redesignated (less 3d Platoon) 1 August 1962 as Headquarters and Headquarters Company, 197th Infantry Brigade, and relieved from assignment to the 99th Infantry Division concurrently withdrawn from the Army Reserve and allotted to the Regular Army (3d Platoon, 99th Reconnaissance Troop, Mechanized, concurrently redesignated as Headquarters and Headquarters Company, 198th Infantry Brigade - hereafter separate lineage)
- Activated 24 September 1962 at Fort Benning, Georgia
- Inactivated 16 August 1991 at Fort Benning, Georgia
- Transferred 9 November 2006 to the United States Army Training and Doctrine Command
- Headquarters activated 18 July 2007 at Fort Benning, Georgia
- Inactivated 12 December 2013 at Fort Benning, Georgia
- Activated 31 July 2020 as a training Brigade at Ft. Benning, Georgia.

=== Campaign participation credit ===
- World War II: Rhineland, Ardennes-Alsace, Central Europe
- Southwest Asia: Defense of Saudi Arabia, Liberation and Defense of Kuwait

=== Decorations ===
- Belgian Fourragere 1940
  - Cited in the Order of the Day of the Belgian Army for action at the SIEGFRIED LINE
  - Cited in the Order of the Day of the Belgian Army for action at ELSENBORN RIDGE
  - Cited in the Order of the Day of the Belgian Army for action in the ARDENNES

== See also ==
- The Institute of Heraldry: 197th Infantry Brigade
