= Michael Spigelmire =

United States Army general

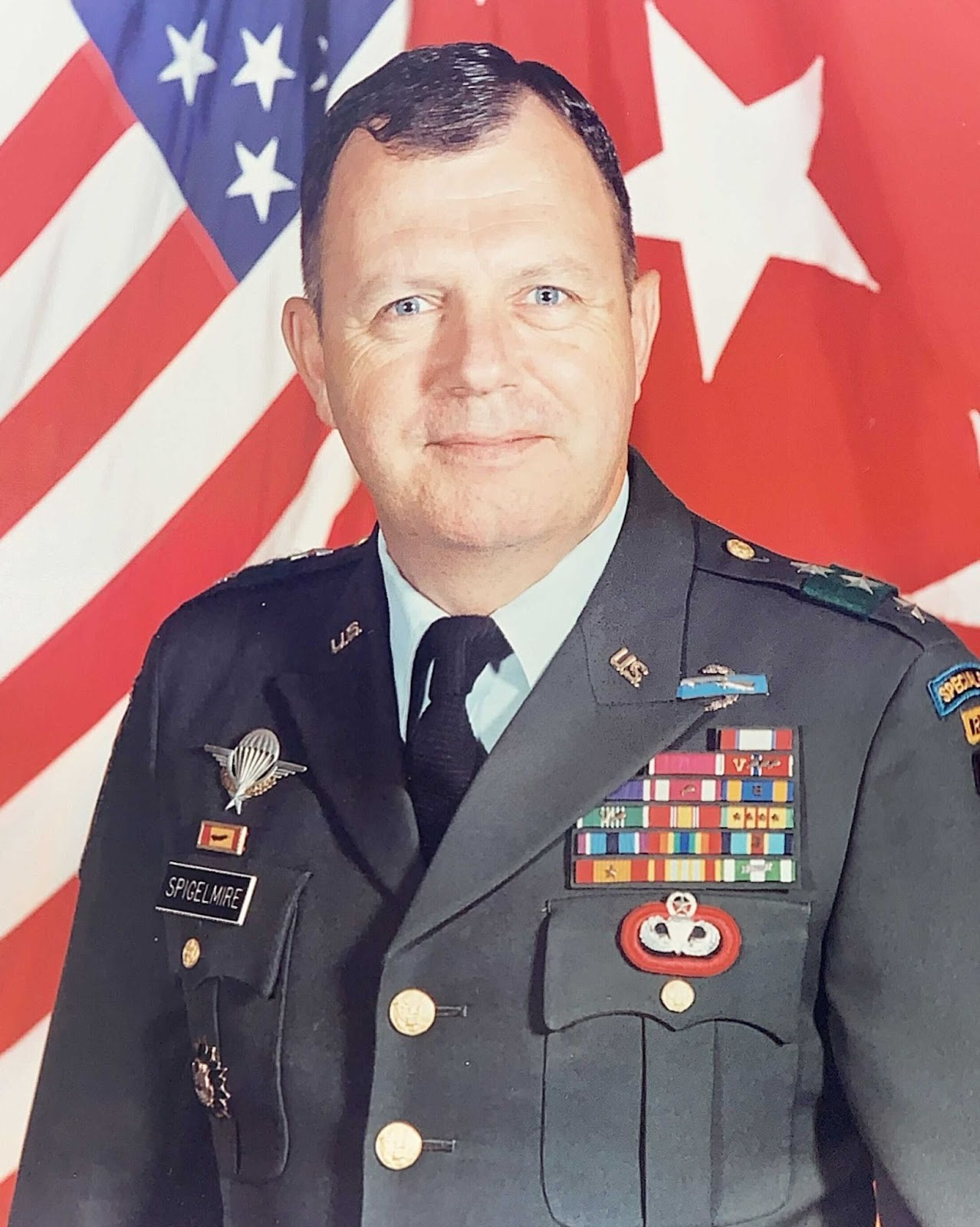
- Born: November 12, 1938 (age 87); Frederick, Maryland, U.S.
- Military career
- Allegiance: United States
- Branch: United States Army
- Rank: Lieutenant General
- Commands: VII Corps; United States Army Special Operations Command; United States Army Infantry School; 24th Infantry Division (Mechanized); 197th Infantry Brigade
- Conflicts: Vietnam War
- Awards: Army Distinguished Service Medal; Legion of Merit; Bronze Star Medal (4); Purple Heart

Michael Spigelmire (born November 12, 1938) is a retired lieutenant general of the United States Army.

== Early life and education ==
The youngest child of Charles Edgar Spigelmire and Josephine Spigelmire (née Kaminski), Michael Spigelmire was raised in Baltimore, Maryland, and educated at Loyola High School and Loyola College in Maryland, both Jesuit institutions. He was in Reserve Officers' Training Corps during college, and upon graduation from Loyola College with a bachelor's degree in political science, received a commission as a second lieutenant in the United States Army. His military education includes completion of the Infantry School, United States Army Command and General Staff College, and the United States Army War College. He earned a master's degree in international relations from Georgetown University.

== Military career ==
Spigelmire's military career includes an initial tour of duty in Germany, where he served in company and division level positions with the 24th Infantry Division and as an A-Team detachment executive officer and commander with the 10th Special Forces Group. He was then assigned to Vietnam, where he commanded a company and later served as a battalion adjutant with the 1st Cavalry Division. A stateside tour as an instructor with the Infantry School at Fort Benning, Georgia ensued, followed by another combat tour as a district senior advisor in Vietnam.

In 1972, Spigelmire was assigned to the Pentagon, where he served as an Operation Staff Officer in the Office of the Deputy Chief of Staff for Military Operations. Thereafter, he served as an Assistant Secretary to the General Staff, Office of the Chief of Staff, Army. Returning to duty with troops, he was a brigade executive officer and later commanded a battalion in the 1st Cavalry Division. He returned to Fort Benning in 1978 as Deputy Director for Combat Developments, United States Army Infantry School and later, as Commander, 197th Infantry Brigade. Subsequently, he had another tour in Europe as Assistant Chief of Staff (Operations), G-3, VII Corps. In 1984, he assumed duties at Fort McPherson as Assistant Deputy Chief of Staff for Operations (Plans, Operations, and Mobilization), United States Forces Command.

In August 1985, Spigelmire was named as the Assistant Division Commander, 24th Infantry Division (Mechanized), Fort Stewart, Georgia. He served as division commander until September 1988. Returning again to Fort Benning, Georgia Spigelmire commanded the United States Army Infantry Center and served simultaneously as the Commandant, United States Army Infantry School. In June 1990, he assumed command of the United States Army Special Operations Command at Fort Bragg, North Carolina, where he served until August 1991.

In September 1991, Spigelmire assumed command of the VII Corps in Stuttgart, Germany, with the mission to inactivate the corps, withdraw 80,000 troops from Germany and return the VII Corps colors to the United States.

Spigelmire's awards and decorations include the Army Distinguished Service Medal, Legion of Merit, the Bronze Star Medal with "V" Device (with three Oak Leaf Clusters), the Purple Heart, the Meritorious Service Medal (with Oak Leaf Cluster), Air Medals, the Army Commendation Medal with "V" Device (with Oak Leaf Cluster), the Combat Infantryman Badge, the Master Parachutist Badge, and Ranger Tab, the Special Forces Tab, and the Army Staff Identification Badge.

== Post-military career ==
Spigelmire retired from the army in July 1992. In August 1992, he assumed the position of Deputy Director, Operations for The Atlanta Committee for the Olympic Games. In 1994 he became the Director of Outlying Site and Department of Defense Relations, working with municipal, state and federal officials.

Spigelmire currently is an independent consultant in Leadership, Management and Defense issues, with offices in Destin, Florida. Additionally, he is the Senior Mentor for the Air Force Special Operations School Terrorist Response Senior Seminar and a member of the National Research Council Committee on Army Science and Technology for Homeland Defense. Spigelmire is a member of The Association of the U.S. Army, The Air Force Association and a Life Member of The National Infantry Association, The Army War College Foundation and The Special Operations Forces Association. He is also a trustee of the National Infantry Foundation.

== Personal life ==
Spigelmire, previously married to Cecelia Malloy with one son, has been married for many years to the former Diane Cast, of Columbus, Georgia. Their son, Christopher, is a lieutenant colonel in the United States Air Force.
