= United States Army Infantry School =

U.S. Army school dedicated to training infantrymen for service in the Army

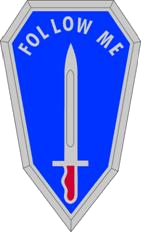
- School headquarters', Airborne and Ranger Training Brigade's distinctive unit insignia
- Founded: 1918
- Country: United States
- Allegiance: United States Army Transformation and Training Command
- Branch: United States Army
- Type: Light Infantry
- Role: Infantry training
- Part of: Maneuver Center of Excellence
- Garrison/HQ: Fort Benning, Georgia
- Motto: "Follow Me"
- Colors: The official color of the United States Army Infantry is Blue

Commanders
- Current commander: Brig. Gen. Jim D. Keirsey

Insignia
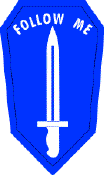
- Shoulder sleeve insignia

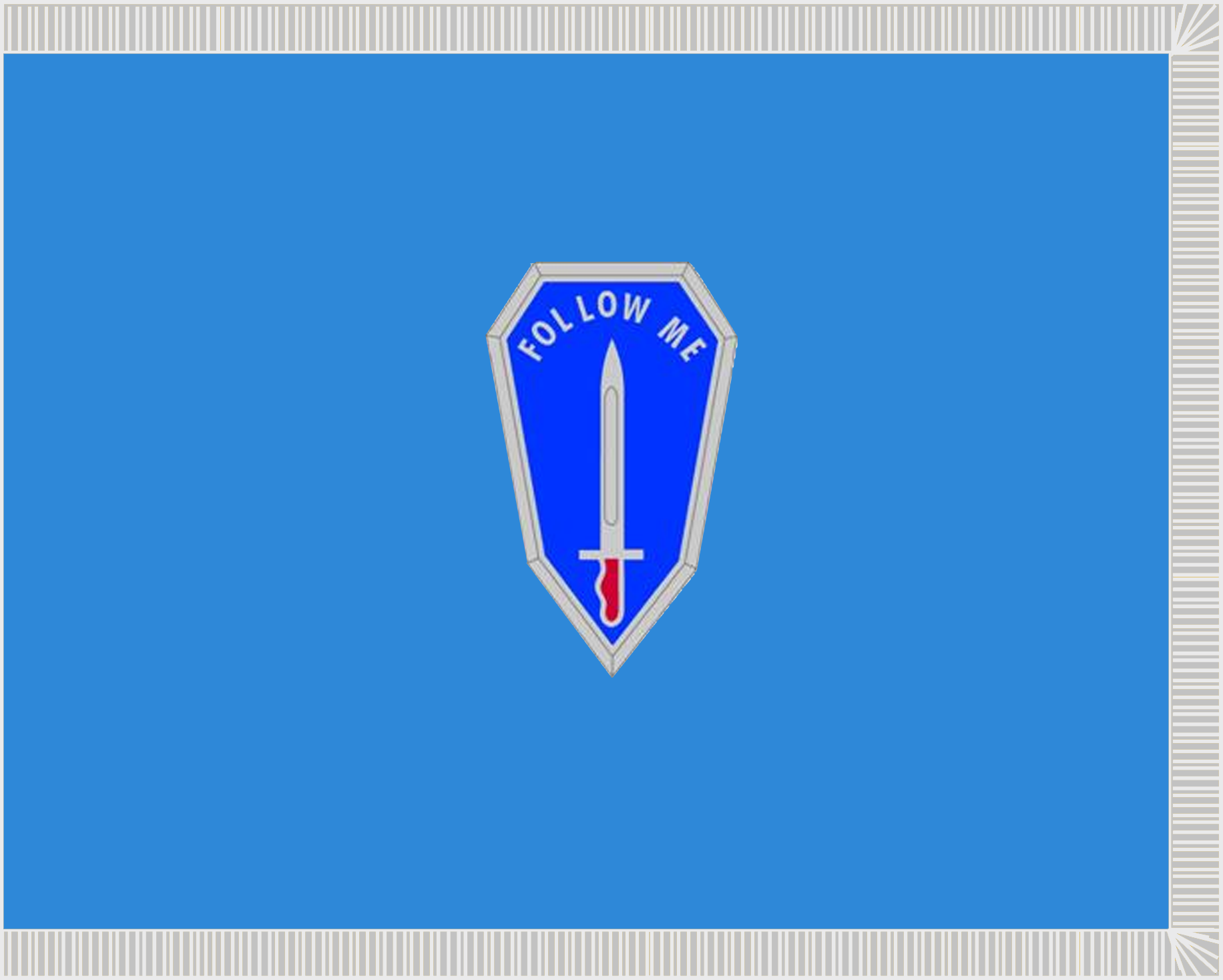
- US Army Infantry School Flag

The United States Army Infantry School is a school located at Fort Benning, Georgia, that is dedicated to training infantrymen for service in the United States Army.

== Organization ==
The school is made up of the following components:

- 197th Infantry Brigade
  - 2nd Battalion, 29th Infantry
  - 1st Battalion, 46th Infantry
  - 2nd Battalion, 47th Infantry
  - 3rd Battalion, 47th Infantry
  - 3rd Battalion, 54th Infantry
- 198th Infantry Brigade (Reflagged from Infantry Training Brigade) (ITB)
  - 1st Battalion, 19th Infantry
  - 2nd Battalion, 19th Infantry
  - 1st Battalion, 50th Infantry
  - 2nd Battalion, 54th Infantry
  - 2nd Battalion, 58th Infantry

For new recruits beginning their specialized training in the infantry, the 197th and 198th Infantry Brigades conduct 22 weeks of One Station Unit Training (OSUT) consisting of both Basic Combat Training (BCT) and Advanced Individual Training (AIT). The mission of the brigades is to transform civilians into disciplined infantrymen that possess the Army Values, fundamental soldier skills, physical fitness, character, confidence, commitment, and the Warrior Ethos to become adaptive and skillful infantrymen ready to close with and destroy the enemies of the United States.

- 199th Infantry Brigade (Reflagged from 11th Infantry Regiment)
  - 2nd Battalion, 11th Infantry (Infantry Basic Officer Leader Course) (IBOLC)
  - 3rd Battalion, 11th Infantry (Officer Candidate School) (OCS)
  - 3rd Battalion, 81st Armor Regiment (MCoE Provost)
  - Maneuver Captains Career Course
  - International Student Training Detachment
  - United States Army Sniper School
  - Henry Caro Non-Commissioned Officers Academy
    - Maneuver Senior Leaders Course (M-SLC), formerly Advanced Noncommissioned Officer Course (ANCOC)
    - Advanced Leaders Course (ALC), formerly Basic Noncommissioned Officer Course (BNCOC)
    - Warrior Leader Course (WLC), formerly Primary Leadership Development Course (PLDC)
- Airborne and Ranger Training Brigade
  - 4th Ranger Training Battalion (Camps Rogers and Darby)
    - Ranger School (Darby phase)
    - Reconnaissance and Surveillance Leaders Course (RSLC)
  - 5th Ranger Training Battalion (Camp Frank D. Merrill)
    - Ranger School (Mountain phase)
  - 6th Ranger Training Battalion (Camp Rudder, Auxiliary Field 6, Eglin Air Force Base, Florida)
    - Ranger School (Swamp phase)
  - 1st Battalion, 507th Infantry Regiment
    - Airborne School
    - Jumpmaster School
    - Silver Wings (MCoE Command Exhibition Parachute Team)
- Combined Arms and Tactics Directorate (CATD)
- Directorate of Operations and Training/G-3
  - Training Support Center
- Office of Infantry Proponency (OIP) "Warrior Ethos" program that was launched in 2003 by the United States Army.

Infantry officers who have completed commissioning and the Basic Officer Leadership Course then attend the Infantry Officer Basic Leadership Course in 2nd battalion. This is a course of instruction, as the name implies, in basic infantry skills, including marksmanship, machine gunnery, tactics, and planning.

The brigade also conducts specialized training for soldiers in Basic Airborne, Pathfinder, and Jumpmaster Courses.

=== Former Units ===
For many years the 1st and 2nd Battalions of the 29th Infantry Regiment provided branch specific programs of instruction as part of the Infantry school. In July 2007 the 29th Infantry Regiment was reflagged into the 197th Infantry Brigade as part of the Army's transition to a Brigade focused structure. This organization continued until 12 December 2013 when the 197th Infantry Brigade was deactivated. Shortly thereafter the programs of instruction provided by the 29th Infantry Regiment were consolidated under 1st Battalion 29th Infantry Regiment, reflagged as part of the 316th Cavalry Brigade, and the 2nd Battalion 29th Infantry Regiment was deactivated. Under the purview of the Maneuver Center of Excellence (MCoE), as part of the 316th Cavalry Brigade, 1st Battalion 29th Infantry Regiment continues to teach combat skills and support MCoE training, the Infantry School, and Infantry Soldiers and leaders by providing the following courses:

- Bradley Leaders Course (BLC)
- Bradley Master Gunner (BMG) Course
- Combatives Course
- Dismounted C-IED Tactics Master Trainer (DCT-MT)
- Heavy Weapons Leader Course
- Simulations Training Managers Course (STMC)
- Stryker Leader Course (SLC)
- Stryker Master Gunner Course (SMGC)
- Small Unmanned Aircraft System Master Trainer (SUAS)

== Commandant ==
The Chief of Infantry is the proponent of the school and its commandant.

No.	Image	Name	Start	End
1		Colonel Henry E. Eames	5 October 1918	22 April 1919
2		Major General Charles S. Farnsworth	22 April 1919	31 July 1920
3		Brigadier General Walter H. Gordon	1 August 1920	8 November 1923
4		Brigadier General Briant H. Wells	9 November 1923	8 March 1926
5		Brigadier General Edgar T. Collins	9 March 1926	1 May 1929
6		Brigadier General Campbell King	2 May 1929	31 May 1933
7		Brigadier General George H. Estes	1 June 1933	30 September 1936
8		Brigadier General Asa L. Singleton	1 October 1936	31 August 1940
9		Major General Courtney Hodges	1 September 1940	3 March 1941
10		Major General Omar N. Bradley	4 March 1941	10 February 1942
11		Major General Leven C. Allen	11 February 1942	18 September 1943
12		Major General Charles H. Bonesteel Jr.	19 September 1943	27 June 1944
13		Major General Fred L. Walker	28 June 1944	11 July 1945
14		Major General John W. O'Daniel	12 July 1945	1 July 1948
15		Major General Withers A. Burress	1948	1951
16		Major General John H. Church	1951	1952
17		Major General Robert Young	1952	1953
18		Major General Guy S. Meloy	1953	1954
		Major General Paul L. Freeman	1958	1960
		Major General Charles W. G. Rich	1963	1964
		Major General Robert H. York	1965	1967
		Major General John M. Wright	1967	1969
		Major General Thomas M. Tarpley	1973	1975
		Major General John W. Foss	1983	1985
		Major General Kenneth C. Leuer	1987	1989
47		Major General Benjamin Freakley	2003	2005
48		Major General Walter Wojdakowski	2005	2008
49		Major General Michael Barbero	2008	2009
50		Major General Michael Ferriter	2009	2009
51		Brigadier General Bryan Owens	2009	2011
52		Brigadier General Walter E. Piatt	2011	2012
53		Brigadier General David B. Haight	2012	2013
54		Colonel Robert E. Choppa	2013	2014
55		Brigadier General James E. Rainey	2014	2015
56		Brigadier General Peter Jones	2015	2017
57		Brigadier General Christopher T. Donahue	2017	2018
58		Colonel Townley R. Hedrick	2018	2018
59		Major General David M. Hodne	2018	2021
60		Brigadier General Larry Q. Burris Jr.	2021	2023
61		Major General Monte L. Rone	2023	2024
62		Brigadier General Phillip Kiniery	2024	Current

== See also ==
- Basic Officer Leaders Course
- United States Army branch insignia
- Guidon (United States)
- Combat Infantryman Badge
- Infantry Shoulder Cord
