= 29th Infantry Regiment (United States) =

- Coat of arms
- Active: 1901–1946; 1949–
- Country: United States
- Branch: United States Army
- Type: Infantry
- Role: Training
- Part of: TRADOC
- Garrison/HQ: Fort Benning, Georgia
- Nickname: "Pioneers" (special designation)
- Motto: We Lead the Way
- Engagements: Philippine Insurrection; World War II; *Battle of the Bulge/ Korean War

Commanders
- Notable commanders: Laurence B. Keiser

Insignia
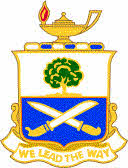
- Distinctive unit insignia

The 29th Infantry Regiment ("Pioneers") is a unit of the United States Army first formed in 1813.

== History ==
=== Previous 29th Regiments ===
The first 29th Infantry was constituted on 29 January 1813, and served in the War of 1812. Following this, the regiment was merged with the 6th Infantry.

The second 29th Infantry was constituted on 3 May 1861, as the 3d Battalion, 11th Infantry Regiment, one of the nine "three-battalion" regiments of regulars, each battalion containing eight companies of infantry, in contrast to the original ten regular regiments of infantry, which were organized on the traditional ten-company line.

Following the Civil War, the Army was reorganized by Congress in July 1866, and the 11th was divided into three regiments, each battalion receiving two additional companies and being organized along traditional lines. The 1st Battalion retained the designation of the 11th Infantry, while the 2nd Battalion became the 20th Infantry and the 3rd Battalion the 29th Infantry. The 29th Infantry was disbanded in the 1869 reduction of the Army to 25 regiments.

=== Third 29th Regiment ===
The present 29th Infantry was created by Congressional order on 2 February 1901. The regiment actually formed on 3 March 1901 at Fort Sheridan, Illinois under the command of Colonel W.M. Van Horn.

Their regimental flag was described as: "...a large white eagle on a field blue, bearing in its beak a ribbon on which were embroidered words "Twenty-nine Infantry..."

One year after its organization, the 29th set sail from San Francisco for the Philippines. The regiment served with distinction on the islands of Cebu, Panay, and Negros. After quelling the insurgency, the regiment remained to suppress bandits until its departure in April, 1904. The 29th performed garrison duties in Utah and Arizona until 1907, when it returned to the Philippines. In 1909 it was transferred in garrison duties in upstate New York, where it remained until 1915, when it was dispatched to Panama for duty guarding the Panama Canal. The regiment participated in a number of jungle exercises, and also guarded German prisoners of war.

The 29th left Panama in September 1918 and arrived at Camp Beauregard, Louisiana shortly thereafter. The regiment was assigned to the newly formed 17th Division, which was preparing to sail to Europe. In late September an epidemic of influenza struck which delayed preparations. By the time the epidemic was over, the Armistice of 1918 had been signed, ending the war in Europe. The regiment remained in Camp Shelby, Mississippi demobilizing troops returning from overseas.

In 1919, the 29th arrived at Fort Benning and immediately assumed the duties of the support and demonstration regiment for the then-new Infantry School. In addition, it was given the mission of actually building the post. For eight years the men of the 29th lived in tents while they built the Cuartel Barracks, Gowdy Field, and Doughboy Stadium, among other things. During this time the regiment adopted the motto "We Lead The Way" in light of its mission as Demonstration Regiment and trainers for the Infantry School. During the time between the World Wars, the 29th Infantry Regiment trained infantry soldiers and leaders, demonstrated tactics and tested innovations in Infantry warfare at Fort Benning including providing soldiers for the first parachute unit in the U.S. armed forces. The 3rd Battalion was inactivated at Fort Benning on 3 October 1922, but was reactivated on 1 October 1933 at Fort Sill, Oklahoma using the personnel and equipment from the 1st Battalion, 38th Infantry Regiment. The 29th Infantry Regiment was concurrently assigned to the 7th Infantry Brigade, 4th Division. The regiment was relieved from assignment to the 4th Division on 16 October 1939.

=== World War II and later ===
When the United States entered World War II, the 29th Infantry was still at Fort Benning, but moved to Fort Jackson, South Carolina, on 3 May 1943. Three months later the regiment moved to Iceland, where it defended the rocky coastline until shipped to England in preparation for the invasion of Europe. In August, 1944 the regiment deployed to France where it provided security to the "Red Ball Express", the supply route which kept the armored thrust rolling into Germany. During the "Battle of the Bulge", the regiment secured and defended river crossings along the Meuse River in the vicinity of Namur and Liege, Belgium. The Regiment saw heavy combat near Jemelle and Rochefort, Belgium and was then deactivated in October, 1946. The 29th served in the Army of occupation at Frankfurt on Main and then in the Bremen Enclave near Bremerhaven at Camp Grohn.

Reactivated on the island of Okinawa in May, 1949, the 29th Regiment was attached to the 24th and 25th Divisions from 24 July 1950 to 5 September 1950. The 1st and 3rd Battalions suffered heavy losses during fighting in the vicinity of Chinju, Masan, and during the establishment of the Pusan perimeter in the Korean War. The regiment returned to Okinawa in September 1950 where it remained until it returned to Fort Benning in November 1954.

Battery C (Composite), 83d Field Artillery, was activated on 21 March 1973 and attached to the 1st Battalion, 29th Infantry. It was located at Kelly Hill on Fort Benning. Battery C provided Field Artillery support to the Infantry School. The battery was equipped with six 105-mm howitzers M101A1, and seven 14.5-mm field artillery trainers M31. The heavy platoon had higher-caliber weapons: two 155-mm howitzers (SP) M109, two 8-inch howitzers (SP) M110 and two 175-mm guns (SP) M107. The support section, in addition to providing ammunition in the field, was also equipped with a 105-mm howitzer M101A1 and a 155-mm howitzer (T) M114A1.

On 17 July 2007, Headquarters & Headquarters Company, 29th Regiment, was deactivated and reflagged 197th Infantry Brigade to follow suit with the rest of the Army under the regimental system. 2nd Battalion, 29th Infantry Regiment, remains within the 197th Infantry Brigade, and continue to provide support the United States Army Infantry School.

On 15 December 2013, the 1st Battalion, 29th Infantry Regiment moved to the 316th Cavalry Brigade following the inactivation of the 197th Infantry Brigade on 13 December 2013.

On 15 March 2019, the battalion was reassigned to the 199th Infantry Brigade.

On 15 June 2021, the 1st Battalion, 29th Infantry Regiment returned to the 316th Cavalry Brigade and currently remains there.

== Current mission ==
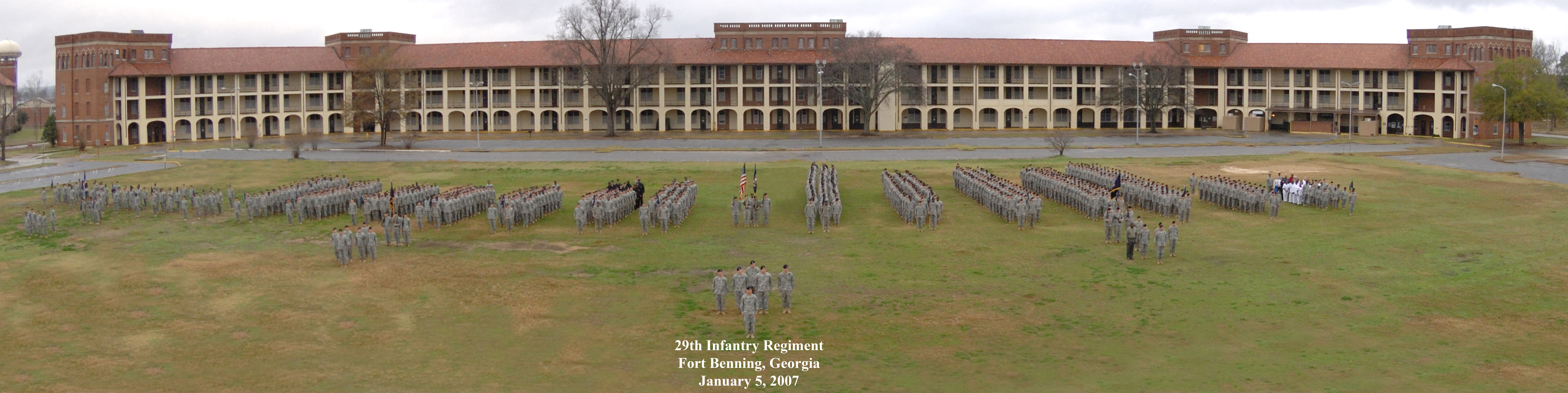
Official photo, 5 January 2007

Today, elements of the 29th Infantry Regiment are located at Fort Benning, GA. The 1,300 officers, non-commissioned officers, soldiers, and civilians assigned to 1st and 2nd Battalion provide instruction in courses that train civilians up to colonels on and in a wide variety of subjects and equipment; subject matter expertise for the development and evaluation of new doctrine and equipment; support Reserve Component units in their periodic training; provide troops, vehicles, and equipment to support Armor School resident instruction; and have prepotency for a variety of field manuals.

== Programs Of Instruction (POI) ==
In its role under the United States Army Armor School, the 1st battalion of the 29th Infantry Regiment provides training to the soldiers of the US Army. Below is a list of the courses currently taught by the 1-29th Infantry Regiment:

- United States Army Sniper Course (USASC)
- Master Marksmanship Training Course (MMTC)
- Stryker Master Gunner (SMG)
- Stryker Leaders Course (SLC)
- Heavy Weapons Leader Course (HWLC)
- Combatives Master Trainer Course (CMTC)
- Small Unmanned Aerial System Master Trainer Course (SUAS-MT)
- Dismounted Counter IED Tactics Master Trainer (DCT-MT)

1-29th IN BN Facebook Page

1-29th IN BN Instagram Page

== One Station Unit Training (OSUT) ==
Under the United States Army Infantry School, The 2nd Battalion, 29th Infantry Regiment is part of the 197th Infantry Brigade and plays a crucial role in training civilians to become soldiers and eventually infantrymen. 2-29th IN BN prepares trainees through rigorous instruction in combat skills, tactics, and discipline.

== Active battalions ==
- 1st Battalion, 29th Infantry Regiment, 316th Cavalry Brigade (POI) – "Pioneers, We Lead the Way"
- 2d Battalion, 29th Infantry Regiment, 197th Infantry Brigade (OSUT) – "Forever Forward"
