= Orwin C. Talbott =

Orwin Clark Talbott
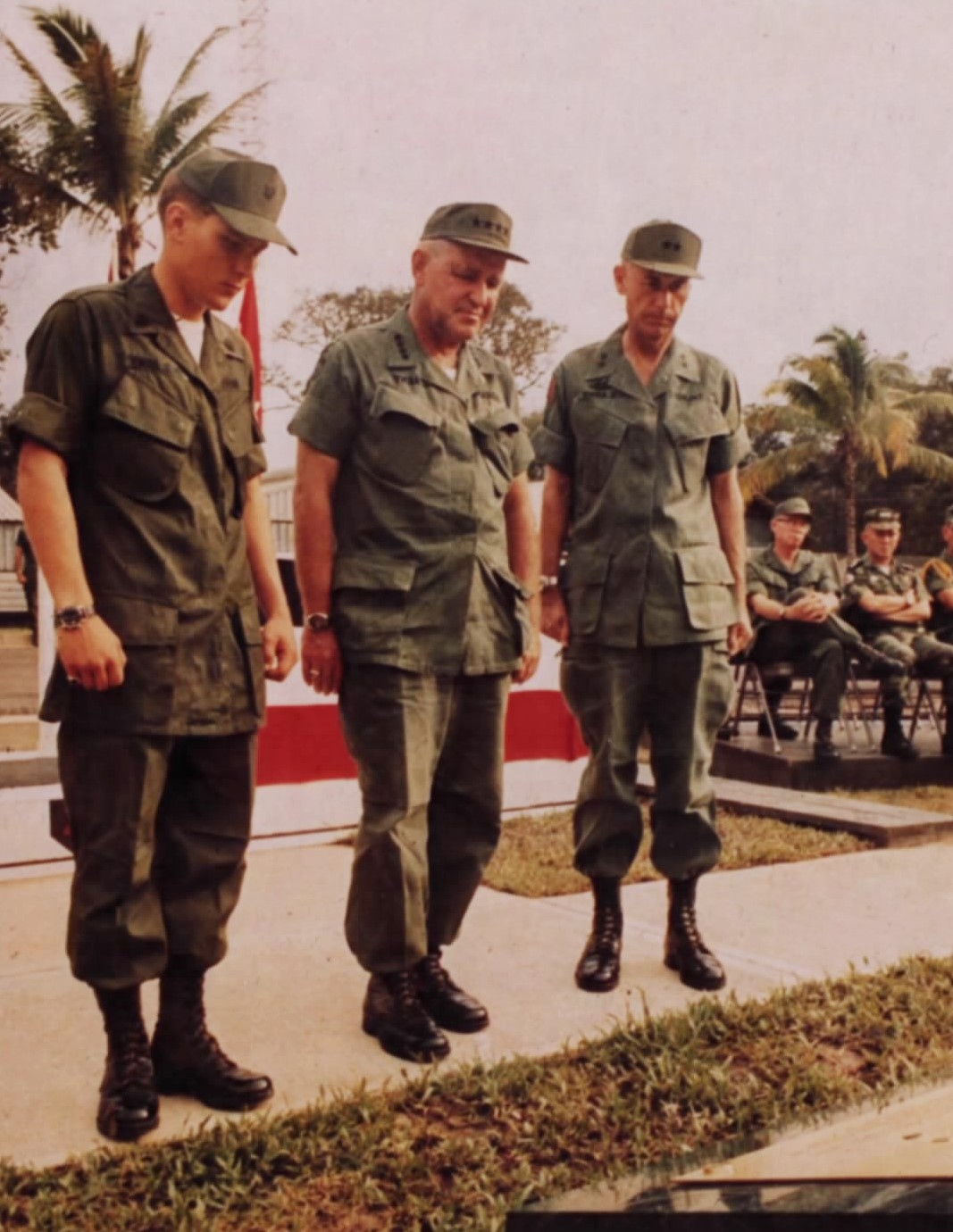
- Talbott (right) with GEN Creighton Abrams (center), COMUSMACV and SP5 Keith L. Ware, II (left), read plaque honoring MG Keith L. Ware at Di An Base Camp
- Born: 18 June 1918; San Jose, California
- Died: 26 April 2011 (aged 92); Washington, D.C.
- Burial place: Arlington National Cemetery
- Military career
- Allegiance: United States of America
- Branch: United States Army
- Rank: Lieutenant general
- Commands: 1st Infantry Division; Fort Benning
- Conflicts: World War II; Vietnam War
- Awards: Distinguished Service Medal (2); Silver Star (3); Legion of Merit; Distinguished Flying Cross (4); Bronze Star (3); Purple Heart (3); Legion of Honour; Croix de Guerre; Gallantry Cross

Lieutenant general Orwin C. Talbott (18 June 1918 – 26 April 2011) was a United States Army officer who served in World War II and the Vietnam War.

== Early life ==
Orwin Talbott was born on 18 June 1918 in San Jose, California to Ernest Orwin Talbott (1885–1951) and his wife Anna Violet Smith. His father was the principal of Molinos High School and his mother was a teacher at another school. He studied at the University of California, Berkeley, but did not graduate.

== Military career ==
In 1941, he joined the U.S. Army. During World War II, he served in the 359th Infantry Regiment, part of the 90th Infantry Division. He first became a company commander and later a battalion commander. He and his unit took part in the Allied landings in Normandy, where his troop transport the USS Susan B. Anthony was sunk by mines off Utah Beach on 7 June 1944. He was awarded the Silver Star twice during the war.

After the war, Talbott stayed in the Army. Between 1959 and 1963 he was a member of the staff of General Lyman Lemnitzer who served as Chief of Staff of the Army (1959–1960), Chairman of the Joint Chiefs of Staff (1960–1962) and Supreme Allied Commander Europe. In 1963, Talbott left Lemnitzer's staff. Subsequently, he commanded a brigade of the 24th Infantry Division in Augsburg, West Germany. He was later transferred to Fort Carson, Colorado, where he served on the staff of the 5th Infantry Division.

In 1968 he was transferred to South Vietnam where he served as assistant division commander of the 1st Infantry Division. In September 1968 he assumed command of the division after General Keith L. Ware died when his helicopter was shot down. In October he received a third Silver Star. He hosted the visit by President Richard Nixon to the division's Dĩ An Base Camp on 31 July 1969. Talbott retained command of the division until August 1969.

In September 1969, he assumed command of Fort Benning. In this capacity, Talbott oversaw the trial of William Calley for his role in the My Lai massacre.

In 1973 he was promoted to Lieutenant general. At the same time, he became deputy commander of the United States Army Training and Doctrine Command. He retired from the Army in 1975.

== Later life and death ==
Following his retirement from the Army he lived in Annapolis, Maryland. There he was head of the Maryland Historical Trust for six years. In 1983, together with other retired generals Lyman L. Lemnitzer and Bruce Palmer Jr. he established the Army Historical Foundation. In 1994 he introduced President Bill Clinton during the 50th anniversary ceremony of the Normandy landings at Utah Beach. In 1999, he moved to Washington, D.C.. He died of a heart attack at Walter Reed Army Medical Center on 26 April 2011. He was buried at Arlington National Cemetery.

== Decorations ==
His decorations include the Distinguished Service Medal (2), Silver Star (3), Legion of Merit, Distinguished Flying Cross (4), Bronze Star (3), Purple Heart (3), Legion of Honour (France), Croix de Guerre (France) and Gallantry Cross (South Vietnam).
