= McKenna Military Operations in Urban Terrain Site =

Coordinates: 32.37030°N 84.80491°W

The McKenna Military Operations in Urban Terrain (MOUT) site was an urban village built by Army engineers for urban training of soldiers on a US Army base in Fort Benning, Georgia. The site belongs to the Soldier Battlelab and was primarily used for live, virtual and constructive experimentation on soldier systems, weapons, and equipment. The McKenna MOUT site was approximately 200 meters square, and included 15 buildings resembling a European village. There was a church, small houses, domestic residences and office-style buildings.

== Virtual MOUT ==
A replica of the existing military base in Fort Benning, Georgia was designed by the Army Research Laboratory (ARL), called virtual McKenna MOUT. The software representation was modeled on the real training site at Fort Benning, Georgia. The software was developed in the early 2000s, for use as a training aid and simulation tool to collect soldier data through sensors. Data collected included individual or team performance and decision-making capabilities. ARL began the program in June 2002 and the software was released publicly in April 2005.

=== History ===
In 1998, the MOUT Advanced Concept Technology Demonstration (ACTD) commissioned ARL to develop a realistic method to assess infantry situational awareness. The software created a virtual world intended to simulate variables effecting cognitive performance of individuals and teams of soldiers, including situational awareness, mission planning, navigation, advanced sensors, and team interaction.

MOUT was a custom environment complete with precise depictions of buildings, terrain, vegetation, enemy units and real training scenarios. MOUT was also developed for savings associated with collection of virtual performance data in lieu of costly field experiments, which were estimated to be up to $50,000 per day at the Fort Benning site.

The first virtual representation of the McKenna MOUT site was based on the shooter PC game, Tom Clancy's Rainbow Six 3: Raven Shield1, which focused on small unit warfare in urban environments.

=== Design ===
The layout of the replica was based on a satellite photo of Fort Benning, along with photographs of interior building plans. The locations of buildings and roads within the virtual McKenna MOUT site were collected using survey data taken at the site.

=== Operation ===
ARL utilized a free-play approach using freeze frames and knowledge assessment questionnaires to assess infantry situational awareness. Two sets of questionnaires were tailored based on the scenario being used, with embedded events included to elicit specific situational awareness responses in the users. Day and night scenarios included the soldiers using their current equipment and then scenarios using new technology. The same scenario was then rerun with different opposing forces and obstacles. The percentage of correct questions for each freeze frame was computed for the two conditions.
