= Lynching of Felix Hall =

1941 lynching of African American soldier in Georgia, United States

Felix Hall was a Black man from Alabama who, at age 19, was lynched, probably by fellow soldiers in Fort Benning, Georgia. Hall had volunteered to join an African-American unit being trained in Fort Benning. He was last seen alive on February 12, 1941, in one of the fort's white neighborhoods. His body was found six weeks later, on March 28, hanging by a noose tied to a tree in a ravine near the Chattahoochee River.

The killers were never found, and evidence suggests that no serious efforts were made at the time by the Army or the FBI to discover the cause of Hall's death. Investigators first called the death a suicide, despite Hall's hands being tied, and later called it a sex crime. Two prime suspects were identified, Sergeants Henry Green and James Carl Hodges. Hodges died in 1961. In an interview decades later, one of Hodges's daughters, Dorothy Carter, said she wouldn't be surprised if her father was involved, recalling her father as a violent drunk who would beat her and her siblings, then break down into tears.

"If a group got together, he would have been right in the middle of it saying, 'Let's go. Let's go.' He was a coward. He wouldn't have done it on his own, but if a group was going, he would have been right in the middle of it."

Another possible suspect who was never named was Hall's white boss at a sawmill, Henry J. Smith, who died in 1951. The day before Hall's murder, Smith had allegedly threatened to kill him and told him not to return to work the next day.

In 2021, a plaque in Hall's memory was installed at Fort Benning. Congressman Sanford D. Bishop Jr., who represents the district where Fort Benning is located, said, "This memorial reminds us of our duty to assure equality and justice for all those who follow in Private Hall’s footsteps in service to our nation."
