= William B. Steele =

United States Army general (1929–2026)

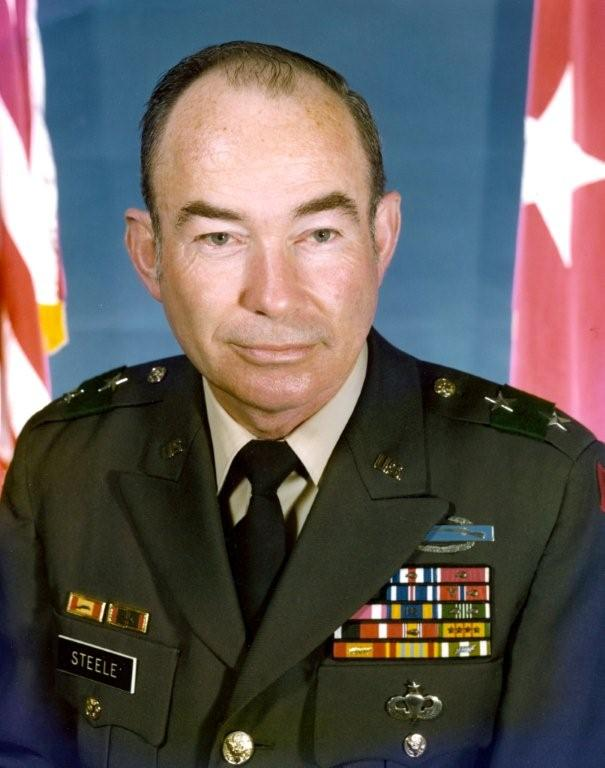
- Steele, during his tenure as a major general
- Born: August 17, 1929; Atlanta, Georgia, U.S.
- Died: February 7, 2026 (aged 96); Columbus, Georgia, U.S.
- Burial place: Lilly, Georgia
- Military career
- Allegiance: United States of America
- Branch: United States Army
- Service years: 1950–1979
- Rank: Major General
- Commands: 5th Battalion (Mechanized) 60th Infantry Regiment,9th Infantry Division, 197th Infantry Brigade (Mechanized), 5th Infantry Division (Mechanized), Fort Polk, Louisiana
- Conflicts: Vietnam War
- Awards: Distinguished Service Medal; Silver Star (2); Legion of Merit; The Distinguished Flying Cross; The Meritorius Service Medal (2); Air Medal (18) the Bronze Star Medal with "V" for Valor the Bronze Star Medal for Meritorius Service

William Berry Steele (August 17, 1929 – February 7, 2026) was a two-star general of the United States Army. He was a commander of the 5th Infantry Division (Mechanized) and Fort Polk, Louisiana. Steele graduated from the University of Georgia in 1950 with a BBA degree, cum laude, and was commissioned as a distinguished military graduate from the Reserve Officer Training Corps (ROTC), as a Second Lieutenant of Infantry in the U.S. Army.

He later attended the Navy Command and Staff College in Newport, Rhode Island, and the Army War College in Carlisle Barracks, Pennsylvania. In addition, he earned a master's degree in International Relations from George Washington University, in Washington, D.C. He spent 29 years in the Army, receiving numerous military decorations and awards, which include the Army Distinguished Service Medal, two Silver Star Medals, the Legion of Merit, the Distinguished Flying Cross, two Meritorious Service Medals, seventeen Air Medals, the Bronze Star Medal with "V" for Valor, the Bronze Star Medal for Meritorious Service and three Army Commendation Medals, as well as several foreign decorations.

== Early life and education ==
The only son of Wade Hampton Steele, Jr. and Frances Lucille Berry, William "Bill" Berry Steele was born in Atlanta, Georgia, on August 17, 1929. However, Bill grew up in rural middle Georgia near Lilly, Georgia, after his mother and father returned to Wade and Dora Steele's farm, his paternal grandparents, in the early years of the Depression. In 1935 the family moved to Fort Valley, Georgia, where Bill's father found a job with the Farm Security Administration (FSA). During Bill's childhood they lived in Tifton, Thomasville, and Athens, Georgia, then later Montgomery, Alabama; Bill and his family returned to Athens in subsequent years. In 1942, the family moved to Lyons, Georgia, but after the death of Bill's paternal grandfather Wade, the family moved back to the Lilly farm. Bill first attended Vienna High School and for his senior year he studied at Gordon Military High School in Barnesville, Georgia. After Gordon Military High School, Bill attended Gordon Junior College for two years, and then continued his studies at the University of Georgia. He also became an Army ROTC cadet.

During this time, Bill dated Virginia "Ginny" Nell Akin and they were married on August 7, 1949, when Bill had one more year to go at the University of Georgia. Upon graduation, Bill was commissioned as a Second Lieutenant of Infantry in the U.S. Army.

== Military career 1950-1979 ==
Steele first trained in Fort Benning, Georgia, with the 1st Battalion, 22nd Infantry Regiment where he was soon deployed to Schweinfurt, Germany. He commanded at every level of troop command from platoon to division level. He commanded rifle companies and held staff positions in the 3rd Infantry Division, the 4th Infantry Division and the 82nd Airborne Division. In August 1967, Steele took command of the 5th Infantry Battalion (Mechanized) in Vietnam and later completed his Vietnam tour as Chief Of Staff of the 9th Infantry Division (Forward). From 1972 to 1974 he commanded the 197th Independent Infantry Brigade (Mechanized) at Fort Benning, Georgia. Finally, he served as Commanding General of the 5th Infantry Division (Mechanized) from 1976 to 1978 and took the division and supporting forces to Germany on a NATO maneuver in 1978.

Steele also handled officer assignments and school selections in the Infantry Officer Assignment Branch of the Department of Army; he was military advisor to the King's Royal Guard in Saudi Arabia; he taught at the U.S. Army Infantry School and the Army War College; he was Executive Officer and Senior Aide to the Army Chief of Staff, General William Westmoreland, and he was Deputy Commander of the U.S. Army Recruiting Command.

== Post-military career with Aflac ==
Following his retirement from the Army in 1979, Steele joined Aflac, Inc. (American Family Life Assurance Company of Columbus) in Columbus, Georgia. While there, he successfully served in both their marketing and administration capacities, with his last four years spent as Senior Vice President for International Operations. He retired from Aflac in 1994, but continued to be active in Army-related matters, having been elected President of the National Infantry Association in 2011.

== Personal ==
Steele married Virginia "Ginny" Nell Akin (1928-2003) on August 7, 1949. They had two sons, Wade Shannon Steele (1951-2000) and William Berry Steele Jr. (1954-). Steele had four grandchildren and seven great-great grandchildren. On November 26, 2005, Steele married Sandra "Sandy" Ingram Cross.

He died on February 7, 2026 while at his home.

== My Journey ==
In 2012 Steele published My Journey, which retraces his life from rural Georgia during the Great Depression to his career in the military. The memoir features his personal sacrifices, triumphs, and tragedies, while ultimately it is about how proud he was to serve his country and to experience the joy and rewards of family life.
