= Fort Benning =

United States Army post in Georgia

- Part of United States Army Transformation and Training Command (T2COM); Special Operations Command (USSOCOM)
- Columbus, Georgia Metropolitan Statistical Area; Chattahoochee County, Georgia (93%) and Russell County, Alabama (7%) ≈182,000 acres (74,000 ha, 284 sq mi, 740 km^{2})
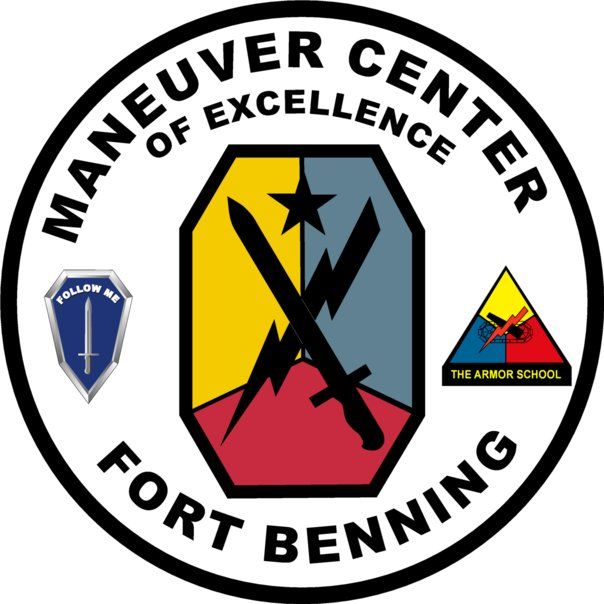
- Maneuver Center of Excellence

Site information
- Type: Army post
- Controlled by: United States Army
- Website: Official website

Location
- Location within Georgia Location within the United States
- Coordinates: 32°21′58″N 84°58′09″W

Site history
- Built: 1909; 117 years ago
- In use: 1918–present

Garrison information
- Garrison: Units and tenant units: 198th Infantry Brigade; 197th Infantry Brigade; 199th Infantry Brigade; 194th Armored Brigade; 316th Cavalry Brigade; Airborne and Ranger Training Brigade; Officer Candidate School; Henry Caro Noncommissioned Officer Academy; 75th Ranger Regiment; 551st Infantry Regiment; Army Marksmanship Unit; 283d MCOE Band; 17th Special Tactics Squadron, USAF; Western Hemisphere Institute for Security Cooperation (WHINSEC); United States Army Armor School; United States Army Infantry School; Martin Army Community Hospital

Fort Benning (named Fort Moore from 2023 to 2025) is a United States Army post in the Columbus, Georgia, area. Located on Georgia's border with Alabama, Fort Benning supports more than 120,000 active-duty military, family members, reserve component soldiers, retirees and civilian employees on a daily basis. As a power projection platform, the post can deploy combat-ready forces by air, rail, and highway for their designated mission. Fort Benning is the home of the United States Army Maneuver Center of Excellence, the United States Army Armor School, United States Army Infantry School, the Western Hemisphere Institute for Security Cooperation (formerly known as the School of the Americas), elements of the 75th Ranger Regiment, the 1st Security Force Assistance Brigade, and other tenant units.

Established in 1918 as Camp Benning, named after Confederate general Henry L. Benning in the American Civil War, it was the Home of the Infantry. (Note: Fort Sill encompassed the Infantry School in 1913; the Infantry school moved to Camp Benning in 1918.) In 1922 Camp Benning became Fort Benning. In 2005, it was transformed into the Maneuver Center of Excellence, as a result of the 2005 Base Realignment and Closure (BRAC) Commission's decision to consolidate a number of schools and installations to create various "centers of excellence". Included in this transformation was the move of the Armor School from Fort Knox to Fort Benning.

In May 2023, as part of the removal of names associated with the Confederacy, Fort Benning was renamed Fort Moore after General Hal Moore and his wife Julia Compton Moore. In March 2025, the secretary of defense ordered that the name of Fort Moore be changed back to Fort Benning. The base name now pays tribute to Corporal Fred G. Benning, who was awarded the Distinguished Service Cross for his extraordinary heroism in action during World War I with the U.S. Army in France in 1918.

== Name ==
The installation was originally named for Henry L. Benning, a brigadier general in the Confederate States Army during the Civil War. Fort Benning was one of the ten U.S. Army installations named for former Confederate generals that were renamed on 11 May 2023.

As a result of national protests following the 25 May 2020 murder of George Floyd, a black man, by Minneapolis police, Congress began to evaluate Democratic proposals to strip the names of Confederate leaders from military bases, including Fort Benning. The congressionally mandated Naming Commission recommended that Fort Benning be renamed Fort Moore after Lieutenant General Hal Moore and his wife Julia Compton Moore, both of whom are buried on post. On 6 October 2022, Secretary of Defense Lloyd Austin accepted the recommendation and directed the name change occur no later than 1 January 2024. The redesignation ceremony officially renaming Fort Benning as Fort Moore was held on 11 May 2023, the day the renaming took effect.

On March 3, 2025, Defense Secretary Pete Hegseth ordered the U.S. Army to rename the base back to Fort Benning, but with the new namesake of Corporal Fred G. Benning, who earned a Distinguished Service Cross in World War I. By March 4, 2025, the reverted name and logo of Fort Benning were displayed on portions of the official US Army website.

A pamphlet describing Fort Benning and Lawson Field

== History ==
Fort Benning was originally named after Confederate General Henry L. Benning. It is now named after US Army Corporal Fred G. Benning.

=== Establishment ===
Camp Benning was established on 19 October 1918, initially providing basic training for World War I units, post-war. Dwight D. Eisenhower served at Benning from 24 December 1918 until 15 March 1919, with about 250 of his Camp Colt, Pennsylvania, tankers who had been transferred to Benning after the armistice. In December 1918, a portion of the Camp Polk tank school near Raleigh, North Carolina was transferred to Camp Benning "to work in conjunction with the Infantry school". Camp Benning tank troops were moved to Camp Meade in February 1919.

In February 1920, Congress voted to declare Camp Benning a permanent military post and appropriated more than $1 million of additional building funds for the Infantry School of Arms, which later became the Infantry School. By the fall of 1920, more than 350 officers, 7,000 troops and 650 student officers lived at Camp Benning. The post was renamed to Fort Benning in 1922, after Henry L. Benning, a general in the army of the Confederate States of America. Benning fought against U.S. Army troops in the Civil War as commander of Confederate States Army forces.

In 1924, Brig. Gen. Briant H. Wells became the fourth commandant of the Infantry School and established the Wells Plan for permanent construction on the installation, emphasizing the importance of the outdoor environment and recreation opportunities for military personnel. During Wells' tenure, the post developed recreational facilities such as Doughboy Stadium, Gowdy Field, the post theater and Russ swimming pool. Doughboy Stadium was erected as a memorial by soldiers to their fallen comrades of World War I. One of the Doughboys' original coaches was a young captain named Dwight D. Eisenhower.

Lt. Col. George C. Marshall was appointed assistant commandant of the post in 1927 and initiated major changes. Marshall, who later became the Army Chief of Staff during World War II, was appalled by the high casualties World War I caused, he thought, by insufficient training. He was determined to prevent a lack of preparation from costing more lives in future conflicts. He and his subordinates revamped the education system at Fort Benning. The changes he fostered are still known as the Benning Revolution. Later in his life, Marshall went on to author the Marshall Plan for reviving postwar Europe and was awarded the Nobel Peace Prize in 1953.

=== World War II ===
In August 1940, two officers and 46 enlisted volunteers of what was known as the Parachute Test Platoon, made their first airborne jump over Lawson Field at Fort Benning after intensive training. Observers from several countries including Germany and the Soviet Union attended. These 48 were the seed that grew into the branches of America's Airborne Infantry.

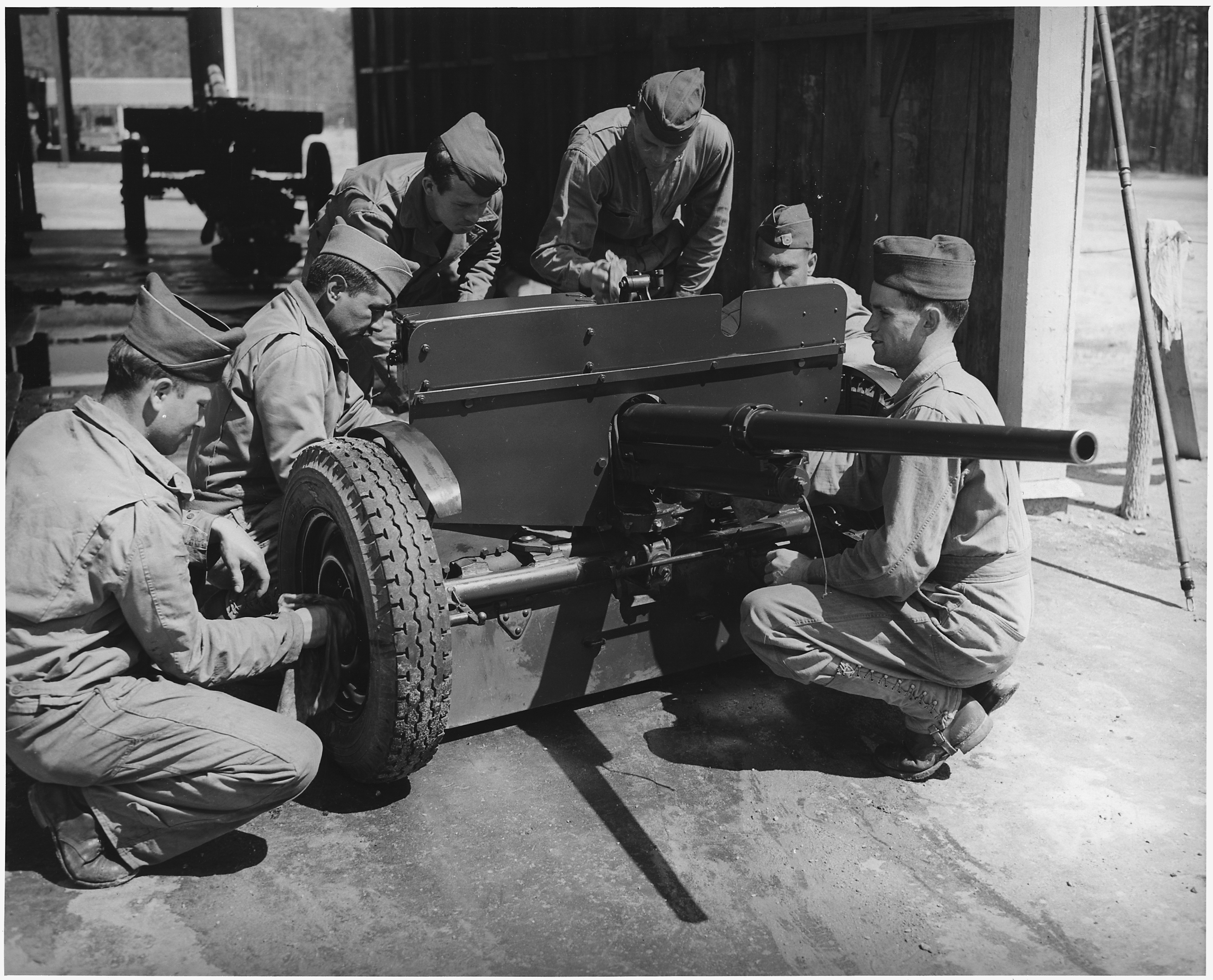
The crew of a 37 mm gun M3 anti-tank gun, in training at Fort Benning, Georgia, April 1942

During World War II, Fort Benning had 197,159 acres (79,787 ha) with billeting space for 3,970 officers and 94,873 enlisted persons. Among many other units, Fort Benning was the home of the 555th Parachute Infantry Company, whose training began in December 1943. The unit's formation was an important milestone for black Americans, as was explored in the first narrative history of the installation, Home of the Infantry. The battalion, later expanded to become the 555th Parachute Infantry Battalion and nicknamed the Triple Nickels, was trained at Fort Benning but did not deploy overseas and never saw combat during World War II.

During this period, the specialized duties of the Triple Nickels were primarily in a firefighting role, with over one thousand parachute jumps as smoke jumpers. The 555th was deployed to the Pacific Northwest of the United States in response to the concern that forest fires were being set by the Japanese military using long-range incendiary balloons. The 82nd Armored Reconnaissance Battalion was activated 15 July 1940, and trained at the Fort. The 17th Armored Engineer Battalion became active and started training 15 July 1940.

==== Racial killings ====
On 28 March 1941, the body of Private Felix "Poss" Hall was found hanged in a shallow ravine near what is now Logan Avenue. Born on 1 January 1922, in Millbrook, Alabama, he enlisted in the Army in August 1940. He was assigned to serve in the 24th Infantry Regiment at Fort Benning, an all-Black segregated unit formed after the Civil War. Two cousins and his best friend from Millbrook were also stationed at Fort Benning and bunked near him. Hall was known for being friendly and popular, and worked at the base sawmill. On 12 February he told his friends that he was headed to the post exchange for Black servicemen after his work shift. He was last seen alive around 4:00 p.m. in Block W, an all-White neighborhood between the mill and post exchange. He did not appear at bugle call the next morning, and was declared a deserter, nearly a month after his disappearance.

His body was found by soldiers on 28 March 1941, hanging against the edge of a ravine in a wooded area. His death was officially declared a homicide, although military officials speculated he had committed suicide. A Fort Benning physician examined his body on 8 April and ruled it a homicide. A 0.25-inch (6.4 mm) noose tied to a sapling was wrapped around his neck, his feet had been bound by baling wire and attached with a rope to other saplings, and his hands were tied behind him. The position of his feet indicated that he had attempted to pile dirt beneath his feet to help alleviate the pressure on his neck.

His murder became widely reported in Black newspapers throughout the country, and the only known publicly available photograph of Felix was published in The Pittsburgh Courier. The FBI conducted a 17-month long investigation, but ultimately no one was charged for the murder of Hall. On 3 August 2021, the Army unveiled a marker in memory of Felix Hall at the site where he was last seen alive. A memorial event was also held during the unveiling of his marker. His name is inscribed at the National Memorial for Peace and Justice.

On 23 March 1941, Private Albert King, a black serviceman, was killed by Sergeant Robert Lummus, who was White, following an altercation on a bus. After a night of drinking, King, Pfc. Lawrence Hoover, and their girlfriends, were riding on a bus around 3:30 a.m., back to their barracks. King was shouting and "cussing", according to the driver and other Black passengers. The driver stopped the bus near the Fort's gates and Sergeant Lummus, a Military Police motorcycle officer, boarded the bus. When Lummus tried to take King and Hoover off the bus, King ran out the front door, and Lummus hit Hoover with a blackjack.

After taking Hoover into custody, Lummus later found a Black soldier walking back toward the main post. Lummus approached King and threatened to arrest him. When King claimed that Lummus could not do so, Lummus shot King five times, killing him. During the trial, later that day, it was claimed that King had drawn a pocket knife when approached by Lummus, though Hoover denied that King had a pocket knife with him. Lummus was found not guilty of murder and transferred the next day to Fort Knox.

=== Cold War ===
At the start of the Korean War an Airborne Ranger Training Center was established by Colonel John G. Van Houten under the direction of General J. Lawton Collins.

The 4th Infantry Division, first of four divisions committed by the United States to the North Atlantic Treaty Organization, reorganized and completed its basic training at Fort Benning (Sand Hill and Harmony Church areas) from October 1950 to May 1951, when it deployed to Germany for five years.

The Airborne School on Main Post has three 249-foot (76 m) drop towers called "Free Towers." They are used to train paratroopers. The towers were modeled after the parachute towers at the 1939 World's Fair in New York. Only three towers stand today; the fourth tower was toppled by a tornado on 14 March 1954.

During the spring of 1962, General Herbert B. Powell, Commanding General, U.S. Continental Army Command, directed that all instruction at the Infantry School after 1 July reflect Reorganization Objective Army Division structures. Therefore, the Infantry School asked for permission to reorganize the 1st Infantry Brigade under a ROAD structure. Instead, the Army Staff decided to inactivate the Pentomic-structured brigade and replace it with a new ROAD unit, the 197th Infantry Brigade, which resolved a unit designation issue.

With the designation 1st Infantry Brigade slated to return to the 1st Infantry Division when it converted to ROAD, the existing unit at Fort Benning required a new title. The staff selected an infantry brigade number that had been associated with an Organized Reserve division that was no longer in the force. For the new ROAD brigade at Fort Benning, Georgia, the adjutant general on 1 August 1962, restored elements of the 99th Reconnaissance Troop, which thirty years earlier had been organized by consolidating infantry brigade headquarters and headquarters companies of the 99th Infantry Division, as Headquarters and Headquarters Companies, 197th and 198th Infantry Brigades.

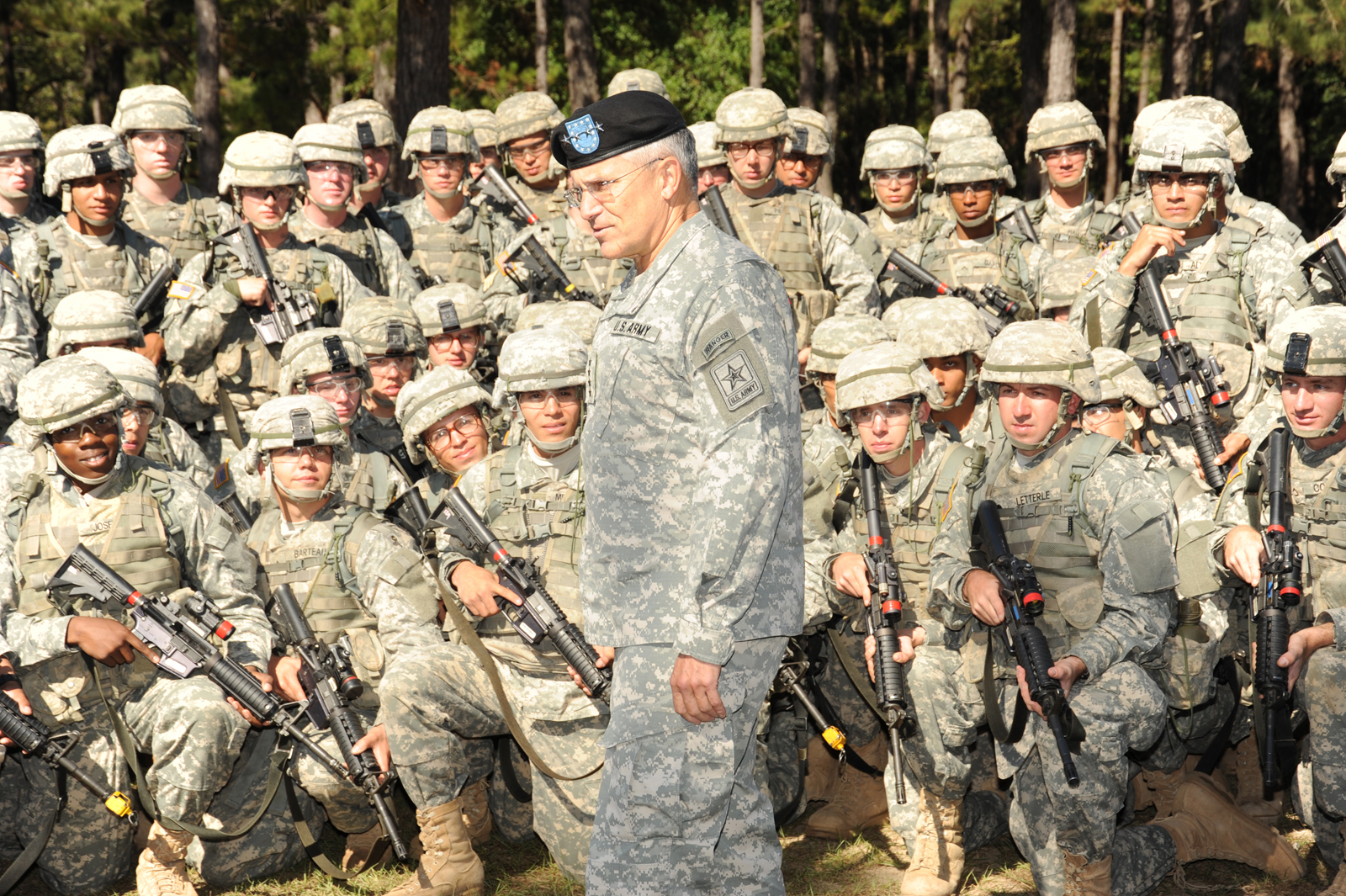
Chief of Staff of the United States Army George W. Casey Jr. at Fort Benning in 2009

Fort Benning was the site of the Scout dog school of the United States during the Vietnam War, where the dogs trained to detect ambushes in enemy terrain got their initial training, before being transferred to Vietnam for further advanced courses.

Fort Benning also had an urban village, McKenna Military Operations in Urban Terrain, built by Army engineers for urban training of soldiers. It was used for live, virtual and constructive experimentation on soldier systems, weapons, and equipment. The site was approximately 200 square meters, and included 15 buildings resembling a European village. There was a church, small houses, domestic residences and office-style buildings.

In 1984, following the signing of the Panama Canal Treaty, the School of the Americas relocated from Fort Gulick (Panama) to Fort Benning. After criticism concerning human rights violations committed by a number of graduates in Latin America, the school was renamed Western Hemisphere Institute for Security Cooperation.

=== 2024 missing weapons incident ===
31 M17 pistols, ENVGs and a thermal optic were reported stolen from Fort Moore's central armory. The Army's Criminal Investigation Division (CID) has offered a $15,000 reward for information leading to the recovery of the stolen items.

Fort Benning, Georgia Home of the Infantry

=== Commanding generals ===
- Colonel Henry E. Eames Oct 1918 – Apr 1919
- Major General Charles S. Farnsworth Apr 1919 – Jul 1920
- Major General Walter H. Gordon Sep 1920 – Nov 1923
- Brigadier General Briant H. Wells Nov 1923 – Mar 1926
- Brigadier General Edgar T. Collins Mar 1926 – May 1929
- Major General Campbell King May 1929 – May 1933
- Brigadier General George H. Estes Sep 1933 – Sep 1936
- Brigadier General Asa L. Singleton Oct 1936 – Aug 1940
- Brigadier General Courtney H. Hodges Oct 1940 – Mar 1941
- Brigadier General Omar N. Bradley Mar 1941 – Feb 1942
- Major General Leven C. Allen Feb 1942 – Sep 1943
- Major General Charles Hartwell Bonesteel Jr. Sep 1943 – Jun 1944
- Major General Fred L. Walker Jul 1944 – Jul 1945
- Major General John W. O'Daniel Jul 1945 – June 1948
- Major General Withers A. Burress Jul 1948 – Jan 1951
- Major General John H. Church Mar 1951 – May 1952
- Major General Robert Nicholas Young Jun 1952 – Jan 1953
- Major General Guy S. Meloy Jr. Jan 1953 – June 1954
- Major General Joseph H. Harper Jun 1954 – May 1956
- Major General George E. Lynch May 1956 – Aug 1956
- Major General Herbert B. Powell Aug 1956 – Apr 1958
- Major General Paul L. Freeman May 1958 – Apr 1960
- Major General Hugh P. Harris Apr 1960 – Jul 1961
- Major General Ben Harrell Aug 1961 – Feb 1963
- Major General Charles W. G. Rich Feb 1963 – Aug 1964
- Major General John A. Heintges Aug 1964 – Jul 1965
- Major General Robert H. York Jul 1965 – Jul 1967
- Major General John M. Wright Jul 1967 – May 1969
- Major General George I. Forsythe May 1969 – Aug 1969
- Major General Orwin C. Talbott Sep 1969 – Feb 1973
- Major General Thomas M. Tarpley Feb 1973 – Aug 1975
- Major General Willard Latham Aug 1975 – Jul 1977
- Major General William J. Livsey Jul 1977 – Apr 1979
- Major General David E. Grange Jr. Jun 1979 – Aug 1981
- Major General RL "Sam" Wetzel Aug 1981 – Jul 1983
- Major General James J. Lindsay Jul 1983 – Mar 1984
- Major General John W. Foss Mar 1984 – Jan 1986
- Major General Edwin H. Burba Jr. Jan 1986 – Jun 1987
- Major General Kenneth C. Leuer Jun 1987 – Sep 1988
- Major General Michael F. Spigelmire Sep 1988 – Jun 1990
- Major General Carmen J. Cavezza Jun 1990 – Oct 1991
- Major General Jerry A. White Oct 1991 – Sept 1994
- Major General John W. Hendrik Sep 1994 – Jul 1996
- Major General Carl F. Ernst Jul 1996 – Sep 1999
- Major General John M. Le Moyne Sep 1999 – Oct 2001
- Major General Paul D. Eaton Oct 2001 – Jun 2003
- Major General Benjamin C. Freakley Jul 2003 – Aug 2005
- Major General Walter Wojdakowski Aug 2005 – Nov 2008
- Major General Michael D. Barbero Nov 2008 – Jun 2009
- Major General Michael Ferriter Jun 2009 – Nov 2010
- Major General Robert B. Brown Nov 2010 – Jun 2012
- Major General H.R. McMaster Jun 2012 – July 2014
- Major General Austin S. Miller July 2014 – March 2016
- Major General Eric J. Wesley March 2016 - March 2018
- Major General Gary M. Brito March 2018 – July 2020
- Major General Patrick J. Donahoe July 2020 - July 2022
- Major General Curtis A. Buzzard July 2022 - July 2024
- Major General Colin P. Tuley July 2024 – present

== Post information ==
Portions of Fort Benning are in Muscogee, Chattahoochee, and Marion counties in Georgia. Additionally, portions of Fort Benning are in Russell County, Alabama. Muscogee County is a consolidated city-county with Columbus, and Chattahoochee County is a consolidated city-county with Cusseta.

There are four main cantonment areas on Fort Benning: Main Post, Kelley Hill, Sand Hill, and Harmony Church.

=== Main Post ===
Main Post houses various garrison and smaller FORSCOM units of Fort Benning such as 14th Combat Support Hospital and 11th Engineer Battalion FORSCOM as well as a number of TRADOC-related tenants, e.g. the Officer Candidate School, the Non-Commissioned Officers Academy, and the Airborne School. McGinnis-Wickham Hall (formerly known as Infantry Hall) is the post headquarters and Maneuver Center of Excellence. Adjacent is the Ranger Memorial and the National Infantry Museum. The Army Infantry School conducts its graduations on Inouye Field, sprinkled with soil from the battlegrounds of Yorktown, Antietam, Soissons, Normandy, Corregidor, Korea, Vietnam, Iraq, and Afghanistan.

=== Kelley Hill ===
The 197th Infantry Brigade was located on Kelley Hill in the 1970s up to 1991. In the immediate aftermath of the Persian Gulf War, the 197th was reflagged as 3rd Brigade, 24th Infantry Division (Mechanized). This unit was reflagged in 1996 to 3rd Brigade, 3rd Infantry Division.

Kelley Hill formerly housed the 3rd Brigade Combat Team of the 3rd Infantry Division (Mechanized), the parent unit of two combined arms battalions; 1st Battalion, 15th Infantry Regiment, 2nd Battalion, 69th Armor Regiment, as well as 3rd Squadron, 1st Cavalry Regiment, 1st Battalion, 10th Field Artillery Regiment, and two support battalions; the 203rd Brigade Support Battalion and the Special Troops Battalion, 3rd BCT. Included in the roster was the 179th Military Intelligence Detachment.

Between 11 December 2015, and 15 December 2015, the 3rd BCT's six subordinate battalions performed inactivation ceremonies on Sledgehammer Field. On 16 December 2015, 1st Battalion, 28th Infantry Regiment Task Force (or Task Force 1-28) was activated in its place. Task Force 1-28 is a 1053-member unit "made up of selected soldiers from the six inactivated battalions that formed the 3rd Brigade Combat Team, 3rd Infantry Division".

Folder of souvenir postcards of Columbus and Fort Benning, Georgia

=== Sand Hill ===
Sand Hill is the primary location of the 198th Infantry Brigade and 197th Infantry Brigade responsible for training Infantry One Station Unit Training (OSUT). Its units include the following:

- 1st Battalion, 19th Infantry Regiment
- 2d Battalion, 19th Infantry Regiment
- 2d Battalion, 29th Infantry Regiment
- 1st Battalion, 46th Infantry Regiment
- 2d Battalion, 47th Infantry Regiment
- 3d Battalion, 47th Infantry Regiment
- 3d Battalion, 54th Infantry Regiment
- 1st Battalion, 50th Infantry Regiment
- 2d Battalion, 54th Infantry Regiment
- 2d Battalion, 58th Infantry Regiment
- 30th AG Battalion (Reception)

Fort Benning, "Home of the Infantry"

=== Harmony Church ===
Harmony Church area houses the 194th Armored Brigade, 316th Cavalry Brigade Armor School and the first phase of Ranger School, 4th Ranger Training Battalion (ARTB). After the 2005 Base Realignment and Closure (BRAC) Commission's decision to create the Maneuver Center of Excellence (MCoE), Harmony Church is now the new home of the Armor School.

== Command group ==
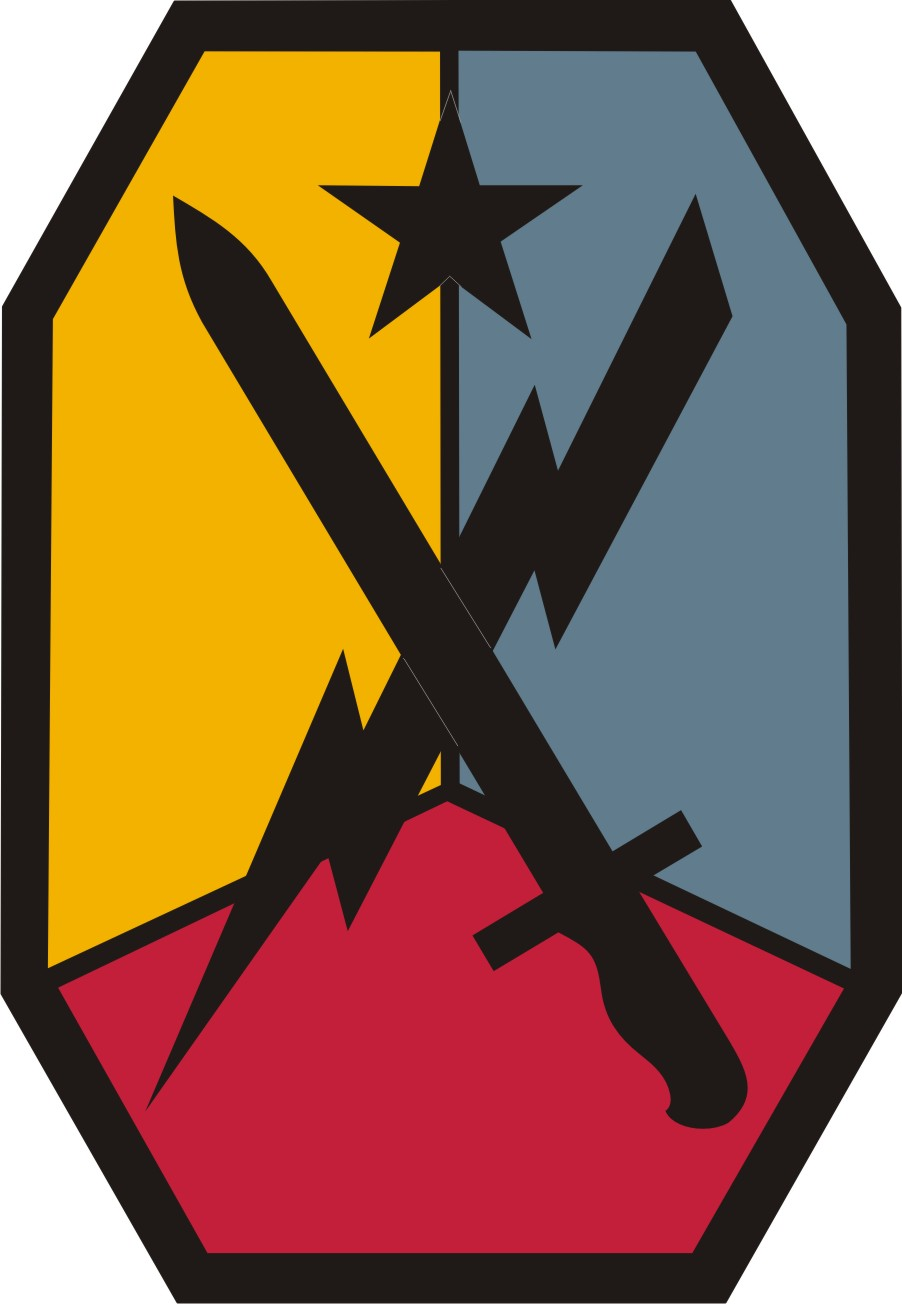
Shoulder patch

Current command team as at October 27, 2026:

- Commanding general, U.S. Army MCoE: Major General Colin Tuley
- Command Sergeant Major, U.S. Army MCoE: Command Sergeant Major Bryan D. Haydt
- Commandant, U.S. Army Infantry School: Brigadier General Jim D. Keirsey
- Command Sergeant Major, U.S. Army Infantry School: Command Sergeant Major Christopher D. Donaldson
- Commandant, U.S. Army Armor School: Brigadier General Kevin D. Bradley
- Command Sergeant Major, U.S. Army Armor School: Command Sergeant Major Ryan D. Roush
- Fort Benning Garrison Commander: Colonel Justin E. Daubert
- Fort Benning Garrison Command Sergeant Major: Command Sergeant Major Andrew J. Pitman

=== Units and tenant units ===
- 194th Armored Brigade, T2COM
  - 1st Battalion, 81st Armor Regiment
  - 2nd Squadron, 15th Cavalry Regiment
  - 5th Squadron, 15th Cavalry Regiment
  - 30th AG Reception Battalion, T2COM
- 316th Cavalry Brigade, T2COM
  - 1st Squadron, 16th Cavalry Regiment
  - 3rd Squadron, 16th Cavalry Regiment (Reconnaissance and Surveillance Leaders Course (RSLC))
  - 1st Battalion, 29th Infantry Regiment
- 197th Infantry Brigade, T2COM
  - 1st Battalion, 46th Infantry Regiment
  - 2nd Battalion, 29th Infantry Regiment
  - 2nd Battalion, 47th Infantry Regiment
  - 3rd Battalion, 47th Infantry Regiment
  - 3rd Battalion, 54th Infantry Regiment
- 198th Infantry Brigade, T2COM
  - 1st Battalion, 19th Infantry Regiment
  - 2nd Battalion, 19th Infantry Regiment
  - 1st Battalion, 50th Infantry Regiment
  - 2nd Battalion, 54th Infantry Regiment
  - 2nd Battalion, 58th Infantry Regiment
- 199th Infantry Brigade, T2COM
  - 2nd Battalion, 11th Infantry Regiment (Infantry Basic Officer Leadership Course (IBOLC))
  - 3rd Battalion, 11th Infantry Regiment (Officer Candidate School)
  - 2nd Squadron, 16th Cavalry Regiment (Armor Basic Officer Leadership Course (ABOLC))
  - 3rd Battalion, 81st Armor Regiment (Provost Battalion, IMSO and MCoE Band)
  - Henry Caro Noncommissioned Officer Academy (NCOA)
    - Maneuver Senior Leaders Course (M-SLC)
    - Advanced Leaders Course (Infantry) (IN-ALC)
    - Advanced Leaders Course (Armor) (AR-ALC)
    - Warrior Leader Course (WLC)
  - Command and Tactics Directorate (CATD)
- Airborne and Ranger Training Brigade (ARTB), T2COM
  - 4th Ranger Training Battalion
  - Headquarters and Headquarters Company (HHC), 507th Parachute Infantry Regiment (Jumpmaster School)
  - Headquarters and Headquarters Company (HHC), 507th Parachute Infantry Regiment Pathfinder School
  - 1st Battalion, 507th Parachute Infantry Regiment (Airborne School)
  - Silver Wings Command Exhibition Parachute Demonstration Team
- Western Hemisphere Institute for Security Cooperation, T2COM
- 75th Ranger Regiment, (USASOC)
  - 3rd Ranger Battalion
  - Regimental Special Troops Battalion (RSTB)
  - Regimental Military Intelligence Battalion (RMIB)
- Martin Army Community Hospital, AMEDD
- Love Dental Clinic, DENTAC, United States Army Dental Command
- U.S. Army Marksmanship Unit, (USAAC)
- 17th Air Support Operations Squadron (18th ASOG), USAF
- 551st Infantry Regiment, USAWHC

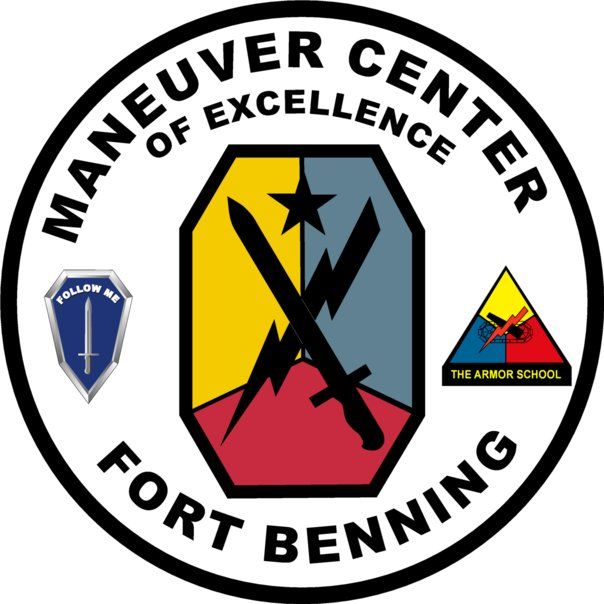

== Armor School move ==
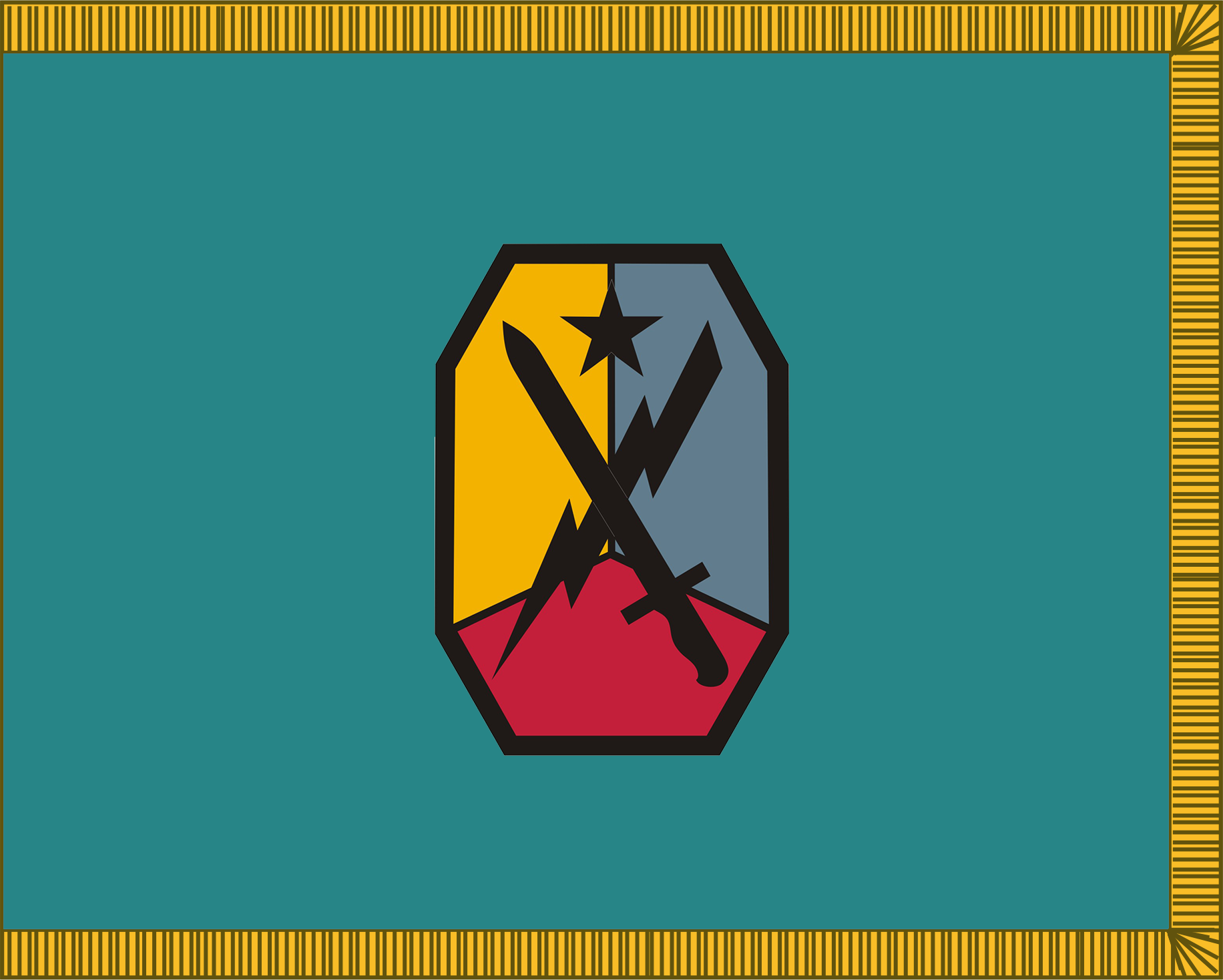
US Army Maneuver Center of Excellence Flag

Fort Benning was selected by the Base Realignment and Closing Commission to be the home of the new Maneuver Center of Excellence (MCoE). This realignment co-located the United States Army Armor Center and School, formerly located at Fort Knox, Kentucky, with the Infantry Center and School. This transformation was completed September 2011.

== Education ==
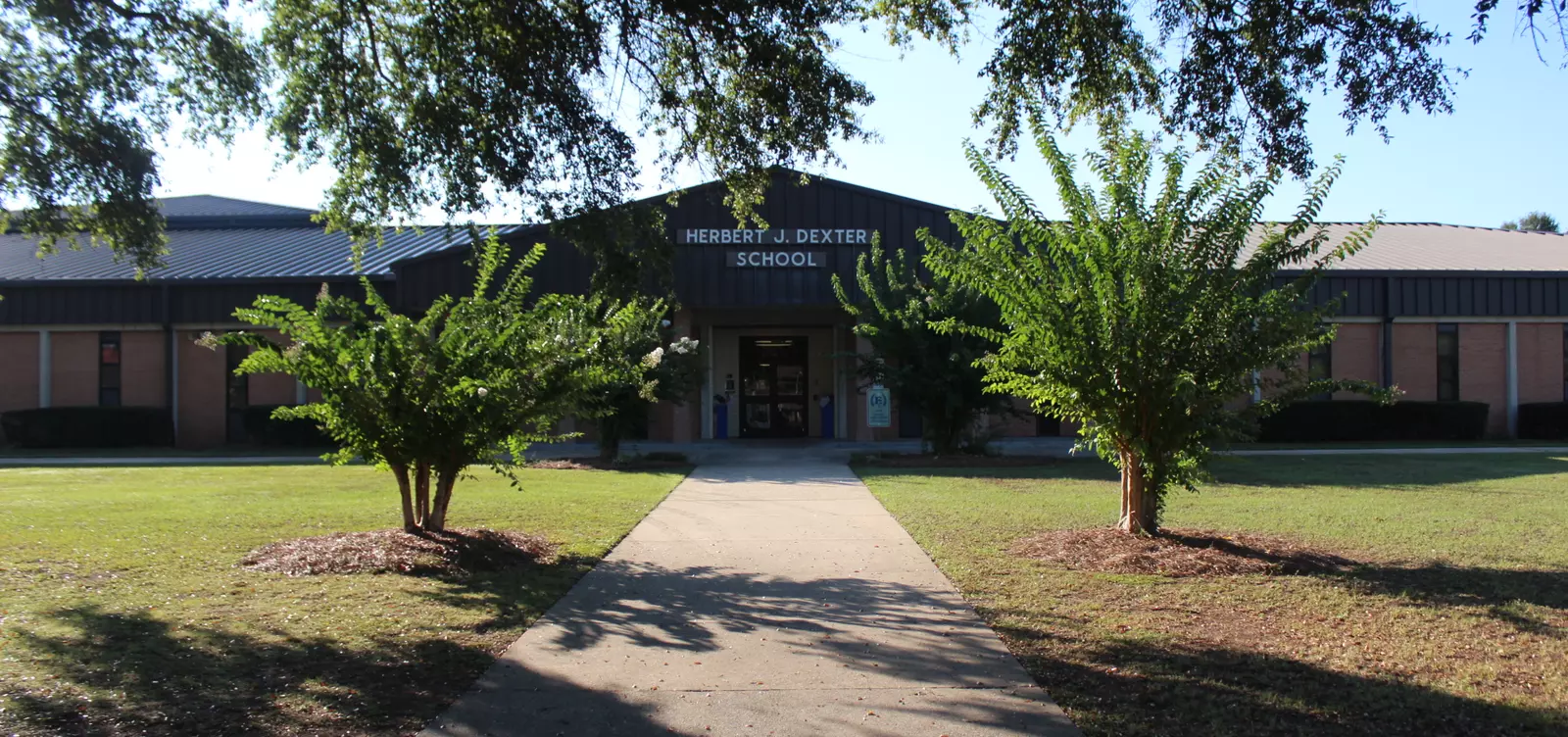
Herbert J. Dexter Elementary School

The Department of Defense Education Activity (DoDEA) operates on-base schools for Fort Benning children:

- Faith Middle School
- Herbert J. Dexter Elementary School
- McBride Elementary School
- Stowers Elementary School
- White Elementary School

High school students attend local public high schools operated by countywide school districts. The portion in Muscogee County is zoned to high schools of Muscogee County Schools. The portion in Chattahoochee County is zoned to Chattahoochee County Schools.

Any Fort Benning pupil, however, may attend Muscogee County schools if their parents wish, as per House Bill 224.

== See also ==
- 17th Armored Engineer Battalion
