= 58th Infantry Regiment (United States) =

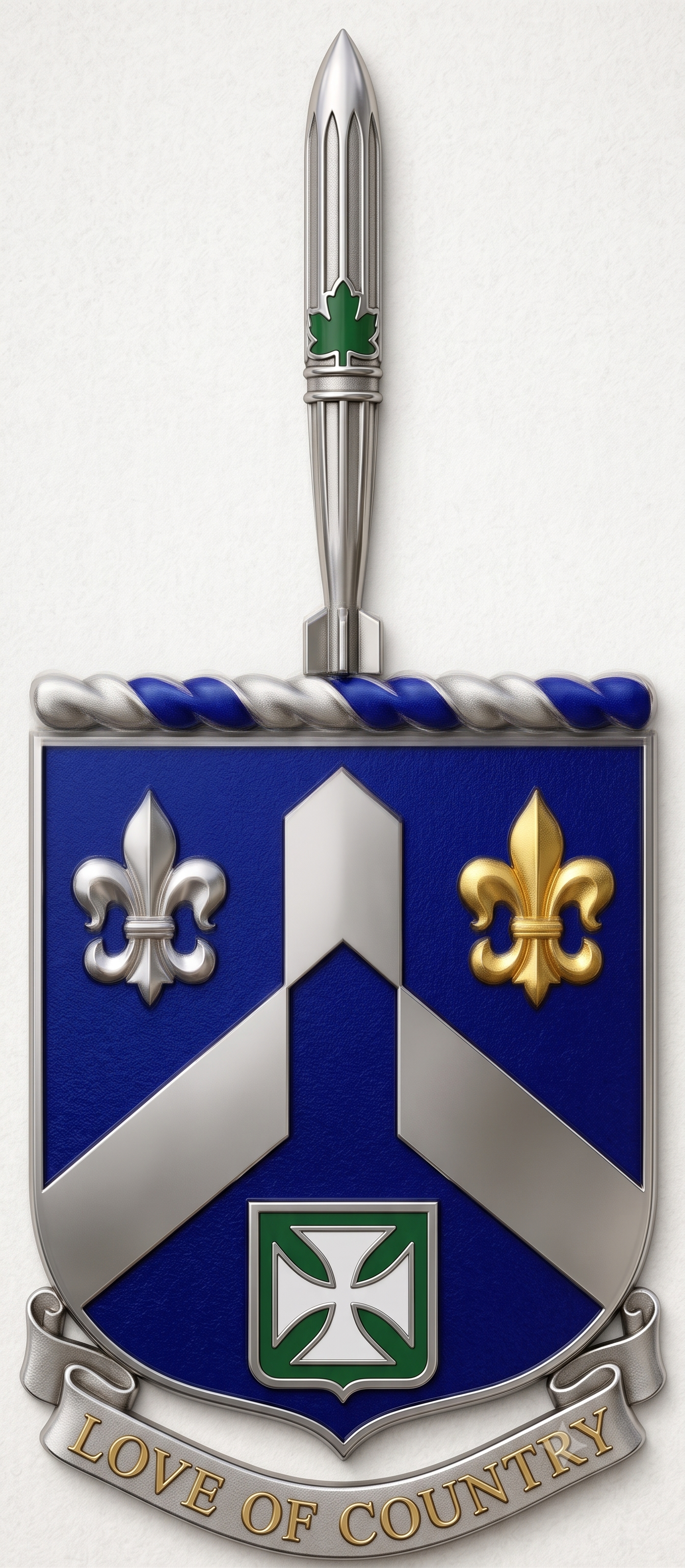
- Coat of arms
- Active: 1917-
- Country: United States
- Branch: United States Army
- Type: Infantry
- Home station: Fort Benning
- Motto: Love of Country

Insignia
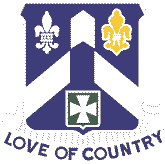
- Distinctive unit insignia

The 58th Infantry Regiment is a regiment of the United States Army first established in 1917.

The regiment was organized in 1917 from the Fourth Infantry as shown on the distinctive unit insignia; the field is blue for Infantry; the regiment served in France in the Fourth Division, shown by the ivy leaves from the shoulder sleeve insignia; the torpedo commemorates the first losses of the regiment when the troopship RMS Moldavia carrying some of the regiment was torpedoed on 23 May 1918; the broken chevron commemorates the piercing of the German line between Soissons and Rheims, which are represented by the silver and golden fleurs-de-lis taken from the coat of arms of those cities, respectively.

Currently the regiment may have two battalions. Starting in 1962, the 1st Battalion, 58th Infantry served with the 197th Infantry Brigade at Fort Benning, while the separate Companies D, E, and F served for varying periods in Vietnam, from 1966 to 1972, under the 93d MP Battalion, the 4th Infantry Division, and the 101st Airborne Division (Airmobile), respectively. Company D provided security for the deep-water port of Qui Nhon and LRP to protect the fuel pipeline from Qui Nhon to Plieku, Companies E and F performed long range reconnaissance missions and were later redesignated as ranger companies of the 75th Infantry.

The 1st Battalion appears to have been reflagged as the 4th Battalion, 7th Infantry Regiment in the mid-1980s.

The lineage of the former Company B, 58th Infantry Regiment was reorganized and redesignated effective 1 July 1957 as Headquarters and Headquarters Company, 2d Armored Rifle Battalion, 58th Infantry, and assigned to the 2d Armored Division (organic elements concurrently constituted and activated). It was inactivated 1 July 1963 at Fort Hood, Texas, and relieved from assignment to the 2d Armored Division. On 1 April 1975 it was redesignated as the 2d Battalion, 58th Infantry, assigned to the 2d Armored Division, and activated at Fort Hood, Texas, then inactivated again on 31 May 1981 at Fort Hood, Texas, and relieved from assignment to the 2d Armored Division. Its headquarters transferred on 28 August 1987 to the United States Army Training and Doctrine Command and activated at Fort Benning, Georgia, as a training unit. (It took over the personnel and mission of the 4th Battalion, 2d Infantry Training Brigade.) On 1 October 2005 it was re-designated as the 2d Battalion, 58th Infantry Regiment. The battalion is tasked to provide trained and ready soldiers for the Army as part of the 198th Infantry Brigade.

== History ==
The 58th Infantry was constituted on 15 May 1917 in the Regular Army as the 58th Infantry and organized 5 June 1917 at Gettysburg National Park, Pennsylvania, from personnel of the 4th Infantry Regiment. Assigned to the 4th Infantry Division 19 November 1917. Inactivated 21 June 1922 at Fort George Wright, Washington, disbanded 31 July 1922.

Reconstituted 8 April 1942 in the Regular Army as the 58th Infantry Regiment. Activated 24 April 1942 at Fort Lewis, Washington. Regiment broken up 26 January 1944 and its elements reorganized and redesigned as follows:

- Headquarters disbanded.
- 1st Battalion as the 203d Infantry Battalion (inactivated 2 March 1945 at Camp Shelby, Mississippi)
- 2d Battalion as the 204th Infantry Battalion (inactivated 8 March 1945 at Camp Shelby, Mississippi)
- 3d Battalion as the 205th Infantry Battalion (inactivated 8 March 1945 at Camp Shelby, Mississippi)

Headquarters, 58th Infantry reconstituted 10 July 1951 in the Regular Army and consolidated with the 203d Infantry Battalion (inactivated 2 March 1945 at Camp Shelby, Mississippi) and with the 58th Armored Infantry Battalion (constituted 15 May 1917 in the Regular Army as the 1st Battalion, 49th Infantry) and consolidated unit designated as the 58th Armored Infantry Battalion, an element of the 8th Armored Division. Relieved from the 8th Armored Division 23 July 1956. Activated 15 August 1956 in Germany; inactivated 9 August 1957 in Germany.

204th Infantry Battalion inactivated 8 March 1945 at Camp Shelby, Mississippi. Redesignated 30 September 1948 as the 43d Armored Infantry Battalion. Activated 28 January 1949 at Fort Sill, Oklahoma as an element of the 2d Armored Division. Relieved from the 2d Armored Division and inactivated 1 July 1957 in Germany.

205th Infantry Battalion inactivated 6 March 1945 at Camp Shelby, Mississippi Redesignated 18 June 1948 as the 45th Armored Infantry Battalion and assigned to the 5th Armored Division, then serving in a training role. Activated 6 July 1948 at Camp Chaffee, Arkansas. Inactivated 1 February 1950 at Camp Chaffee. Relieved from the 5th Armored Division 15 February 1957.

58th, 43d, and 45th Armored Infantry Battalions consolidated 1 July 1959 to form the 58th Infantry, a parent regiment under the Combat Arms Regimental System.

Company C, 58th Infantry was assigned to the 194th Infantry Brigade (later redesignated as the 194th Armored Brigade) on 2 October 1962 and activated on 21 December 1962 at Fort Ord, CA, as a mechanized infantry company. Its existence was brief, however, and the unit was inactivated on 15 May 1964.

On 15 May 1965 Company C was activated in Germany at Nellingen, Germany, by HQ USAREUR General Order 127, 11 May 1965, under the provisions of TOE 7-157E (Infantry Long Range Patrol Company). The order assigned the company to the Seventh Army. HQ Seventh Army General Order 87, 3 August 1965, further assigned the company to VII Corps. Although not included in the designation, the TOE required that all personnel be Airborne qualified. The unit was formed from personnel and equipment of the US Army Long Range Reconnaissance Patrol Company (Airborne) which was inactivated on 15 May 1965 by HQ USAREUR General Order 120, 6 May 1965. Captain Raymond H. Miller was the commander. At the time it was activated, Company C (Long Range Patrol), 58th Infantry, had an authorized strength of six officers and 159 enlisted personnel. At the same time C-58th was activated in VII Corps, Company D (LRP), 17th Infantry was activated in V Corps. Company C later relocated to Fort Carson, CO, where it was inactivated on 10 February 1969 as the unit was reflagged as Company B (Ranger), 75th Infantry.

Companies D, E, and F, 58th Infantry served in Vietnam.

- Company D deployed from Fort Lewis, WA to Vietnam on 29 November 1966 and would remain in Vietnam until 22 June 1972. Co D served as "a rifle security company attached to the 93d Military Police Battalion at Phu Thang, being transferred in 1969 to the 18th Military Police Brigade control at Qui Nhon. It was later posted to Phu Tai under the U.S. Army Support Command, Cam Ranh Bay."
- Company E served as a Long-Range Patrol (LRP) company to the 4th Infantry Division from 20 December 1967 – 1 February 1969, when all LRP companies were reflagged as lettered Ranger companies to the 75th Infantry Regiment. Co E 58th (LRP) would become Co K, 75th Infantry (RANGER) in 1969.
- Company F served as a LRP company to the 101st Airborne Division (Airmobile) from 10 January 1968 – 1 February 1969 when it was reflagged as Co L, 75th Infantry (RANGER). Co F, 58th Infantry (LRP) was based at Camp Eagle near Hue in I Corps, and operated in areas such as the A Shau Valley and the Roung Roung Valley, gathering vital intelligence on the NVA units operating and infiltrating into those areas.

By 1974 the 1st Battalion, 58th infantry was a mechanized infantry battalion assigned to the 197th Infantry Brigade (Separate) at Fort Benning, Georgia. The brigade was reorganizing as a separate mechanized infantry brigade with a go to war mission as the XVIII Airborne Corps heavy force package. During the period 1973-77 the battalion supported several important Army modernization initiatives. On return from three months of gunnery and maneuver training in 1976 at McGregor Range in New Mexico (the brigade and battalion had previously deployed from Kelley Hill Barracks at Ft. Benning to Eglin Air Force Base, Florida for a several week joint exercise), deployed Companies A and B for four months in support of the MICV (Mechanized Infantry Combat Vehicle) Developmental/Operational Tests 1 and 2.

The MICV later became the Bradley Infantry Fighting Vehicle and the Tests also deployed the MILEs systems with their sensors, laser weapons effect systems and other force on force technologies later deployed to Fort Irwin and the National Training Center. Company A was assigned a tank platoon and additional tank section from 2d Battalion, 69th Armor. The company then trained and validated as a unit capable of replicating a Soviet motorized rifle battalion. Company B formed MICV configured platoons along with its M113A1 equipped platoons to operate as a U.S. ground force against a Soviet ground force. The two companies were deployed almost continuously for four months in the Turrentine Range Area and other locations on Fort Benning performing one force on force exercise after another to develop data that eventually led to the deployment of the Bradley Fighting vehicle to the Army.

At the time Company A was an over-strength company of some 220 men (the then-MTOE authorized 187 men) having also been selected as a unit that would retrain NCOs in over strength MOSs as infantry NCOs. A provisional 4th mechanized infantry platoon was formed. This additional platoon with the three tank sections allowed the company to render a Soviet motorized rifle battalion footprint during the force-on-force exercises of the tests. All of this work made important contributions to the Army's highly effective heavy force capabilities that deployed in the two following Iraq Wars.

The 2d Battalion, 58th Infantry was activated at Fort Hood, Texas on 1 April 1975, and assigned to the 2d Armored Division as part of Brigade 75, a program that stationed a forward brigade in Europe while maintaining three brigades at Fort Hood. The battalion deployed to Hohenfels Training Area in Germany in October 1976 as part of the rotations in place at the time, and redeployed in March 1977, remaining at Fort Hood until inactivation on 31 May 1981. On 28 August 1987, the unit was activated at Fort Benning as part of the United States Army Training and Doctrine Command.

The coat of arms was originally approved for the 58th Infantry Regiment on 18 Jun 1921. It was amended on 20 Mar 1924 to correct the shield. On 15 Aug 1942 it was re-designated for the 58th Infantry Regiment (Reinforced). The coat of arms was re-designated for the 58th Infantry on 26 November 1958.

== Campaign streamers ==
World War I

- Aisne-Marne
- St. Mihiel
- Meuse-Argonne
- Champagne 1918
- Lorraine

World War II

- Aleutian Islands
- Rhineland
- Ardennes-Alsace
- Central Europe

Vietnam

- Counteroffensive Phase II
- Counteroffensive Phase III
- Tet Counteroffensive
- Counteroffensive Phase IV
- Counteroffensive Phase V
- Counteroffensive Phase VI
- Tet69 Counteroffensive
- Summer-Fall 1969
- Winter-Spring 1970
- Sanctuary Counteroffensive
- Counteroffensive Phase VII
- Consolidation I
- Consolidation II
- Cease-Fire

== Decorations ==
Meritorious Unit Commendation, Streamer embroidered VIETNAM 1967-1968, Company D cited
