= 54th Infantry Regiment (United States) =

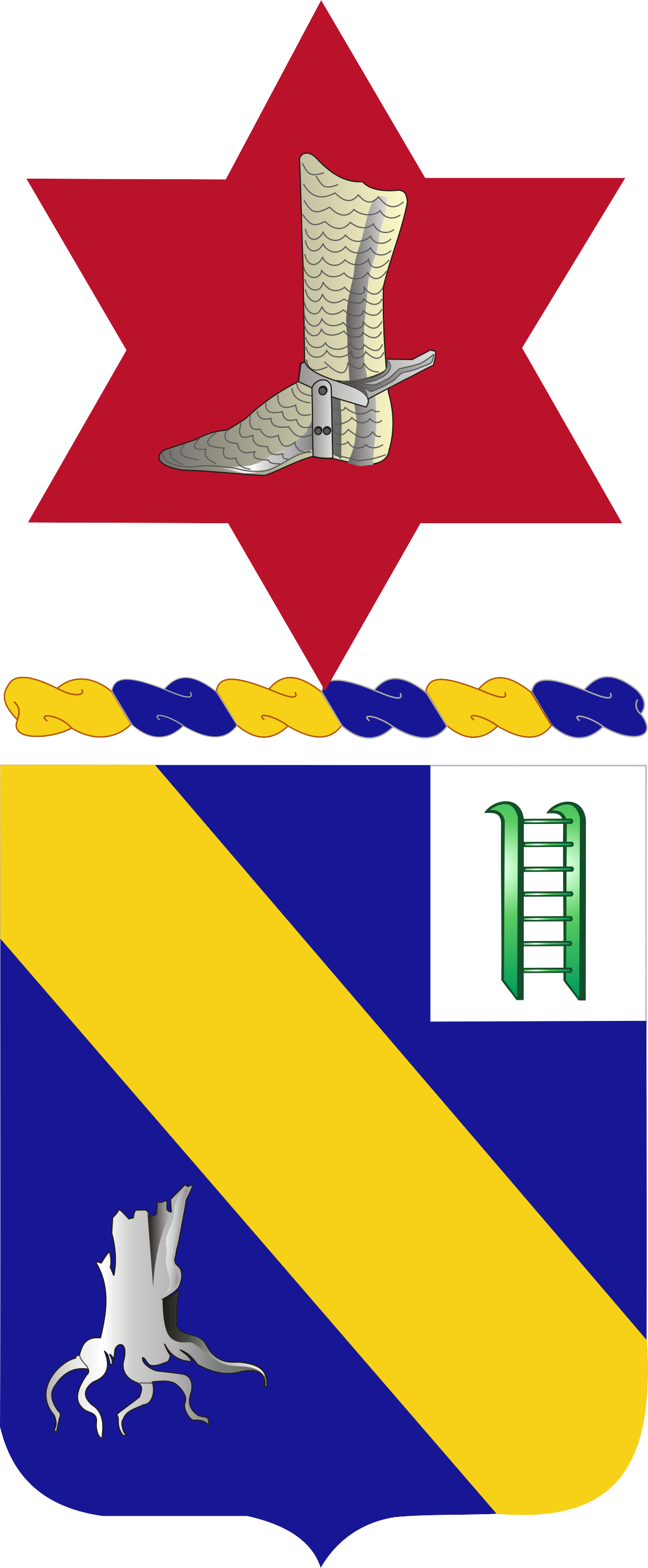
- Coat of arms
- Active: 1917–present
- Country: United States
- Branch: United States Army
- Type: Infantry training
- Motto: I will cast my shoe over it
- Engagements: World War II

Commanders
- Notable commanders: Clement A. Trott

Insignia
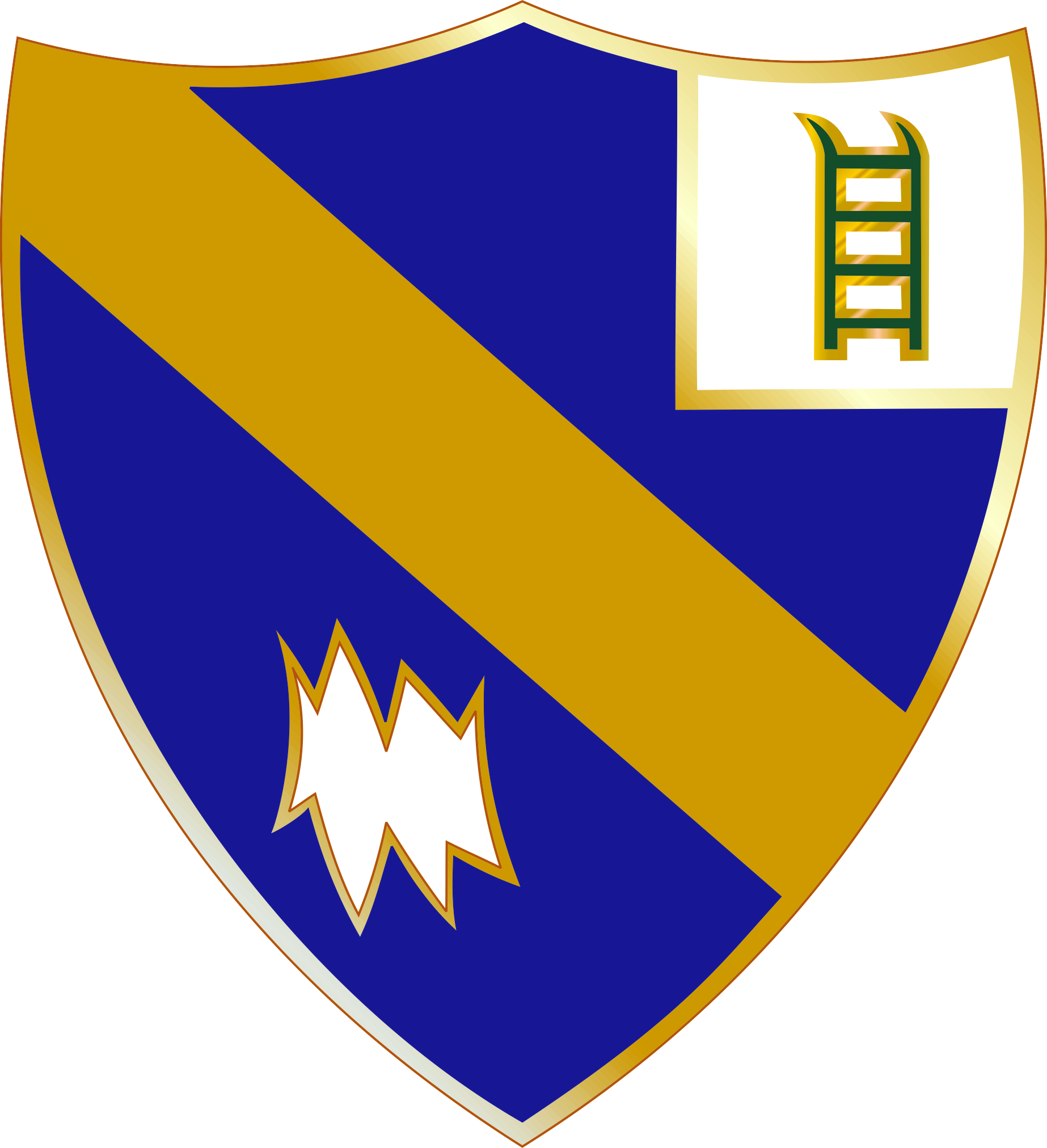
- Distinctive unit insignia

The 54th Infantry Regiment (for a time, known as the 54th Armored Infantry Regiment) is a United States Army Regimental System parent regiment of the United States Army. It is represented in the active Army by the 2nd and 3rd Battalions, which conduct infantry One Station Unit Training (OSUT) at Fort Benning, Georgia.

== History ==
The regiment was constituted on 15 May 1917 in the Regular Army as the 54th Infantry. It was organized on 16 June 1917 at Chickamauga Park, Georgia. It was assigned on 16 November 1917 to the 6th Division. It saw service in France during World War I, earning battle honors for the Meuse-Argonne and Alsace 1918 campaigns. On 29 June 1922, the 2nd Infantry Regiment was designated as the 54th's "Active Associate" unit, intended to furnish a cadre to reactivate the regiment in the event of war. On 17 July 1922, the 17th Infantry Regiment was designated as the regiment's Active Associate. The 54th Infantry Regiment was inactivated on 24 October 1922 at Fort Wayne, Michigan.

On 24 March 1923, the regiment was relieved from the 6th Division and assigned to the 7th Division. In 1926, the regiment was organized as a "Regular Army Inactive" unit with Organized Reserve personnel with its headquarters at Omaha, Nebraska. The "Active Associate" program was discontinued in 1927. In 1930, the regiment was affiliated with the Reserve Officers Training Corps programs at Creighton University and the University of Nebraska, and was manned using Regular Army program staff and Reserve personnel commissioned from the programs. The regiment was relieved on 1 October 1940 from assignment to the 7th Division. Redesignated 14 June 1942 as the 54th Armored Infantry, it was then assigned on 15 July to the 10th Armored Division and activated at Fort Benning.

The regiment was broken up on 20 September 1943 and its elements were reorganized and redesignated as elements of the 10th Armored Division as follows:

- 54th Infantry (less 1st, 2nd, and 3rd Battalions) as the 54th Armored Infantry Battalion
- 1st Battalion as the 61st Armored Infantry Battalion
- 2nd Battalion as the 20th Armored Infantry Battalion
- 3rd Battalion disbanded

- Battalions inactivated 13–23 October 1945 at Camp Patrick Henry, Virginia.
- Relieved 14 September 1950 from assignment to the 10th Armored Division, concurrently consolidated broken up and its elements redesignated as elements of the 10th Armored Division as follows:

- 54th Infantry (less 1st, 2nd, and 3rd Battalions) as the 54th Armored Infantry Battalion
- 1st Battalion as the 561st Armored Infantry Battalion
- 2nd Battalion as the 520th Armored Infantry Battalion
- Former 3rd Battalion reconstituted as the 554th Armored Infantry Battalion

- Battalions relieved 1 April 1957 from assignment to the 10th Armored Division.
- 54th, 561st, 554th Armored Infantry Battalions consolidated 1 July 1959 to form the 54th Infantry, a parent regiment under the Combat Arms Regimental System. Battalions of the regiment then served during the Vietnam War.
- Withdrawn 16 June 1989 from the Combat Arms Regimental System, reorganized under the U.S. Army Regimental System, and transferred to the United States Army Training and Doctrine Command with headquarters at Fort Benning, Georgia.

Today, the 2nd Battalion, 54th Infantry Regiment is a One Station Unit Training battalion on Sand Hill, Fort Benning, Georgia. It has been the starting place for the training of tens of thousands of United States Army infantrymen over the past three decades.

The 3rd Battalion, 54th Infantry regiment was reactivated on 2 August 2019 as a One Station Unit Training unit on Sand Hill, Fort Benning, Georgia. The unit was reactivated to enable the success of the Army's new 22-week OSUT training regime.

== Campaign participation credit ==
- World War I:
1. Meuse-Argonne;
2. Alsace 1918
- World War II:
1. Rhineland;
2. Ardennes-Alsace;
3. Central Europe
- Vietnam:
1. Counteroffensive, Phase II;
2. Counteroffensive, Phase III;
3. Tet Counteroffensive;
4. Counteroffensive, Phase IV;
5. Counteroffensive, Phase V;
6. Counteroffensive, Phase VI;
7. Tet 69/Counteroffensive;
8. Summer-Fall 1969;
9. Winter-Spring 1970;
10. Sanctuary Counteroffensive;
11. Counteroffensive, Phase VII;
12. Consolidation I;
13. Consolidation II;
14. Cease-Fire

== Decorations ==
- Presidential Unit Citation for BASTOGNE
- Meritorious Unit Commendation (Army) for VIETNAM 1967-1968
- Belgian Fourragere 1940 with Palm for BASTOGNE; cited in the Order of the Day of the Belgian Army for action at BASTOGNE.
