= 16th Cavalry Regiment (United States) =

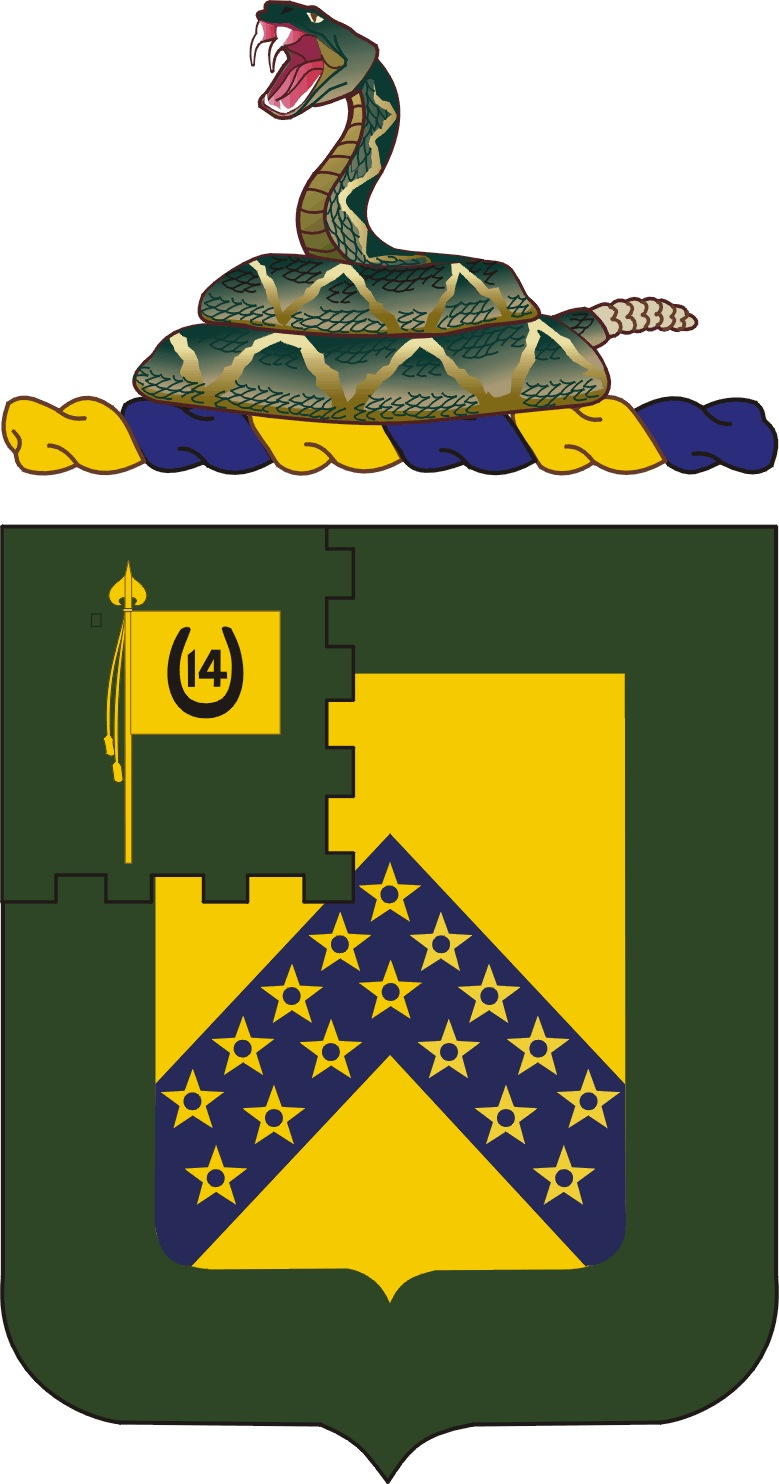
- Coat of Arms of the 16th Cavalry Regiment
- Active: 1916–present
- Country: United States
- Type: Armor
- Home station: Fort Benning
- Motto: "Strike Hard"

Insignia
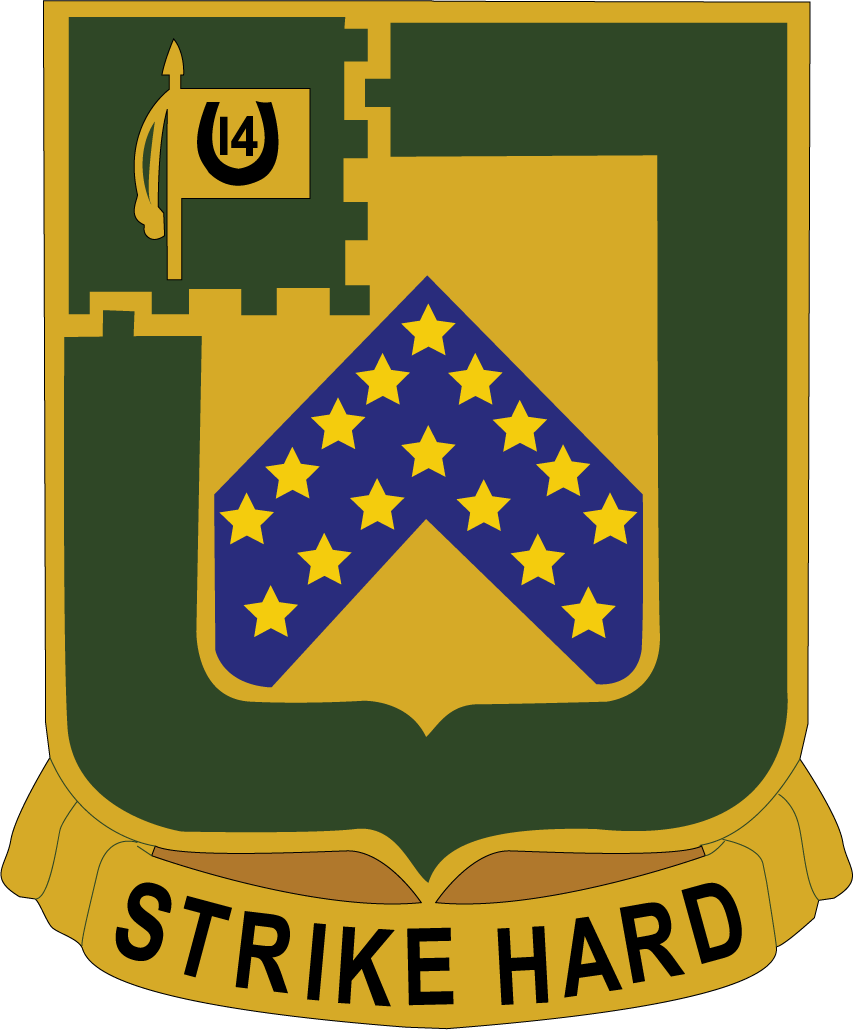
- Regimental distinctive insignia

The 16th Cavalry Regiment is a United States Army Regimental System regiment of the Armor Branch of the United States Army. It was first established in 1916. In 2025-26 the regiment includes three squadrons (1st, 2nd, and 3rd), all assigned to the 316th Cavalry Brigade, Fort Benning, Georgia, supporting the United States Army Armor School.

== Lineage and History ==
The regiment was constituted 1 July 1916 in the Regular Army as the 16th Cavalry and organized at Fort Sam Houston, Texas. It was inactivated on 12 November 1921 at Forts Sam Houston and McIntosh, Texas.

Redesignated 15 June 1942 as the 16th Cavalry, Mechanized, and activated at Camp Forrest, Tennessee.

Regiment broken up 22 December 1943 and its elements reorganized and redesignated as follows:

- Headquarters and Headquarters Troop as Headquarters and Headquarters Troop, 16th Cavalry Group, Mechanized
- 1st and 2d Squadrons as the 16th and 19th Cavalry Reconnaissance Squadrons, Mechanized

After 22 December 1943 the above units underwent changes as follows:

- Headquarters and Headquarters Troop, 16th Cavalry Group, Mechanized, converted and redesignated 1 May 1946 as Headquarters and Headquarters Troop, 16th Constabulary Squadron, and assigned to the 4th Constabulary Regiment (organic elements concurrently constituted and activated)

Reorganized and redesignated 10 February 1948 as Headquarters and Service Troop, 16th Constabulary Squadron Relieved 1 February 1949 from assignment to the 4th Constabulary Regiment Inactivated 27 November 1950 in Germany Redesignated 9 March 1951 as Headquarters and Headquarters Company, 16th Armored Cavalry Group (organic elements of the 16th Constabulary Squadron concurrently disbanded) Activated 1 April 1951 at Camp Cooke, California Reorganized and redesignated 1 October 1953 as Headquarters and Headquarters Company, 16th Armor Group

- 16th Cavalry Reconnaissance Squadron, Mechanized, inactivated 10 February 1946 at Camp Hood, Texas
- 19th Cavalry Reconnaissance Squadron, Mechanized, inactivated 10 November 1945 at Camp Campbell, Kentucky. Redesignated 1 August 1946 as Headquarters and Headquarters Troop, 19th Cavalry Group, Mechanized (organic elements of the 19th Cavalry Reconnaissance Squadron, Mechanized, concurrently absorbed) and activated at Fort Riley, Kansas. Inactivated 6 November 1946 at Fort Riley, Kansas.

Redesignated 2 January 1953 as Headquarters and Headquarters Company, 19th Armored Cavalry Group and activated in Germany. Redesignated 1 October 1953 as Headquarters and Headquarters Company, 19th Armor Group. Inactivated 1 July 1955 in Germany.

Headquarters and Headquarters Company, 16th Armor Group (active) consolidated 2 July 1955 with Headquarters and Headquarters Company, 19th Armor Group, and the 16th Cavalry Reconnaissance Squadron, Mechanized, and consolidated unit designated as Headquarters and Headquarters Company, 16th Armor Group

(Former elements of the 16th Cavalry withdrawn 1 March 1957 from Headquarters and Headquarters Company, 16th Armor Group and redesignated as elements of the 16th Cavalry)

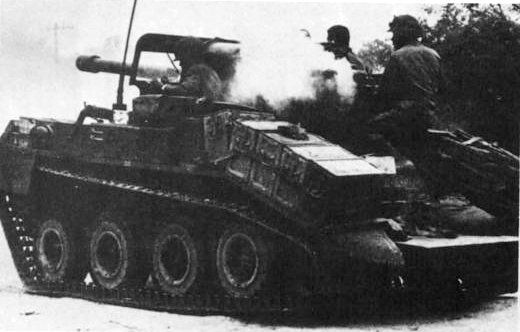
M56 Scorpion SPAT of 16th Armor, US 173rd Airborn Brigade firing at Viet Cong during Operation Toledo 17 June 1966.

Headquarters and Headquarters Company, 16th Armor Group, inactivated 15 April 1968 at Fort Knox, Kentucky; Headquarters concurrently reorganized and redesignated as the 16th Armor, a parent regiment under the Combat Arms Regimental System

16th Armor redesignated 2 September 1969 as the 16th Cavalry

Withdrawn 25 March 1987 from the Combat Arms Regimental System, reorganized under the United States Army Regimental System, and transferred to the United States Army Training and Doctrine Command with headquarters at Fort Knox, Kentucky. On 7 July 2010, the first, second, and third Squadrons were activated at Fort Benning, Georgia under the 316th Cavalry Brigade.

== 1st Squadron ==
The First Squadron, Sixteenth Cavalry Regiment (1-16 Cav) provides support in the form of both soldiers and equipment for the 316th Cavalry Brigade and its subordinate squadrons, as well as for the courses offered through the brigade. Additionally, the squadron is tasked with the support and execution of the annual Maneuver Warfighter Conference, Sullivan Cup, and Gainey Cup competitions as well as providing funeral details for soldiers across the south-eastern region of the United States.

The 550 hundred soldier squadron is currently commanded by LTC Carl Danko and CSM Kevin Stewart serves as the Squadron's Command Sergeant Major.

“Strike” Squadron is currently composed of four Troops that support 11 programs of instruction across the brigade and US Army Armor School:

- Anvil Troop
- Bonecrusher Troop
- Cobra Troop
- Darkhorse Troop

The 1st Squadron has been awarded the Meritorious Unit Commendation as well as the Army Superior Unit Award and served as the primary tactical support element for Operation Distinguished Gentleman in January 2025, which assisted numerous federal agencies during the State funeral proceedings for former US President James Earl Carter.

== 2nd Squadron, 16th Cavalry ==
The Second Squadron, Sixteenth Cavalry Regiment (or 2-16 Cav) is responsible for the Armor Basic Officer Leaders Course (ABOLC), which provides Initial Entry Training for all newly commissioned officers into the Armor Branch. The squadron was assigned to the 199th Infantry Brigade during the Maneuver Center of Excellence reorganization in 2014. The Squadron returned to the 316th Cavalry Brigade in 2019 only to be reassigned under the 199th Infantry Brigade in 2021.

== 3rd Squadron, 16th Cavalry Regiment ==
The 3rd Squadron, 16th Cavalry Regiment (3-16 CAV) forges Army Leaders to build readiness. It is responsible for functional leader training and education. The Squadron (SQDN) is organized with the Army's Department of Reconnaissance and Security, the Department of Combat Power, and the Department of Lethality within the Army University's Armor School at the Maneuver Center of Excellence, Fort Benning, Georgia. The Squadron is commanded by Lieutenant Colonel Brandon C. Cave, and CSM Carvet C. Tate serves as the Squadron's Command Sergeant Major.

The 3rd Squadron 16th Cavalry hosts the following courses:

• Cavalry Leaders Course (CLC)

• Army Reconnaissance Course (ARC)

• Maneuver Leaders Maintenance Course (MLMC)

• Master Gunner Common Core (MGCC)

• Abrams Master Gunner (AMG)

• Bradley Master Gunner (BMG)

• Stryker Master Gunner (SMG)

• Tank Commanders Course (TCC)

• MGS Commanders Course (MGSCC)

• Simulations Training Managers Course (STMC)

• Abrams, Stryker, and Field Maintenance New Equipment Training Team (NETT)

=== Department of Reconnaissance and Security -Phantom Troop ===
The Department of Reconnaissance and Security is the US Army's premier institution for training Reconnaissance and Security (R&S) knowledge, skills and abilities to leaders assigned to Cavalry formations or US Army and US Military formations conducting reconnaissance-focused operations. The Department of R&S provides training to leaders from the Squad to Brigade Staff level, and supports R&S training and education throughout the US Army. The cornerstone R&S courses offered at Fort Moore include Army Reconnaissance Course (ARC) and the Cavalry Leaders Course (CLC).

=== Department of Lethality - Maverick Troop ===
The Department of Lethality educates non-commissioned officers to become the technical and tactical experts on the training and employment of combat platforms - world renown as the experts in their craft. The department hosts the following courses: Master Gunner Common Core (MGCC), Abrams Master Gunner (AMG, Bradley Master Gunner (BMG, Stryker Master Gunner (SMG), Tank Commanders Course (TCC, MGS Commanders Course (MGSCC), and the Simulations Training Managers Course (STMC)

=== Department of Combat Power - Navajo Troop ===
The Department of Combat Power travels to Brigade Combat teams to educate operators and leaders about new Abrams and Stryker platforms as well as Field Maintenance through the New Equipment Training Team (NETT). It also hosts the Maneuver Leaders Maintenance Course (MLMC).

=== Recent History ===
In 2010 the Squadron moved from Fort Knox to Fort Benning and transferred responsibility for the Armor Captains Career Course to 3-81AR creating the Maneuver Career Course. The unit assumed responsibility for all International students training on Fort Benning and all Reconnaissance training.

As part of the Maneuver Center of Excellence Reorganization in 2014, the squadron was reorganized into three Troop and one Airborne Company. Assault Company (IN IET Support) was transferred from 2-29 IN which cased its colors in April 2014. Navajo Troop remained with the squadron and in addition to ARC and CLC assumed control of the SUAS-MT and DCT-MT Courses. Able Company (AR/CAV/BCT IET Support) was attached from 3-81 AR. Delta Company was attached from the Ranger Training Brigade and in addition to RSLC assumed responsibility for ASA A&B. On 1 October 2014, these units were permanently task organized to the 3rd Squadron and renamed A Troop, B Troop, C Troop, and D Company respectively.

On May 18, 2017, A and C Troops were inactivated and the IET support committees were transferred to the 198th and 194th Brigades. On October 5, 2017, B Troop and D Co. were inactivated. H Troop was re-activated with Vietnam era lineage to support the squadron. The Reconnaissance and Security (R&S) Courses were re-aligned under a new Department of R&S while the Department of Security Force Assistance was activated to train Combat advisors for the Security Force Assistance Brigades. On May 4, 2018, the Department of Subterranean Operations was activated.

In January 2019, the Squadron assumed the Maneuver Leaders Maintenance Course (MLMC) under Hawk Troop. On March 12, 2019, the Squadron re-activated M, N, and P Troops as part of a large MCOE re-organization to re-align the Armor and Infantry Schools. RSLC was returned to ARTB as D Company, the SUASMT course, and the SbT program were transferred to 1st Battalion, 29th Infantry, in the 199th Brigade. The Master Gunner School returned to 3rd Squadron along with the New Equipment Training Team. Today the Squadron continues to forge functional skills in excellent leaders to enhance Army readiness in reconnaissance, security, and lethality.

== Distinctive unit insignia ==
- Description

A Gold color metal and enamel device 1 1/8 inches (2.9 cm) in height overall consisting of a shield blazoned: Or a bordure Vert, on a chevron Azure 16 mullets pierced of the field; on a canton embattled (for the 6th Cavalry) Vert (for the 3d Cavalry) a staff erect attached thereto a standard flotant Or charged with a horseshoe, heels upward encircling the Arabic numeral "14" Sable (for the 14th Cavalry). Attached below the shield a Gold scroll inscribed "STRIKE HARD" in Black letters.

- Symbolism

The regiment was constituted in 1916 and organized with personnel from the 3d, 6th and 14th Cavalry which are shown on the canton. Green was the color of the facings of the Mounted Rifles, now the 3d Cavalry; the embattled partition line commemorates the first engagement of the 6th Cavalry when it assaulted artillery in earthworks at Williamsburg in 1862. The shield is yellow (Or), the Cavalry color; the blue chevron is for the old blue uniform, the 16 mullets (spur rowels) indicating both the numerical designation as well as mounted service. The green border and the rattlesnake crest symbolize the birth and subsequent service of the organization on the Mexican Border. The motto has a direct reference to the crest.

- Background

The distinctive unit insignia was originally approved for the 16th Cavalry on 28 October 1958. It was amended to correct the symbolism on 23 June 1960. It was redesignated for the 16th Armor on 22 August 1968. The insignia was redesignated for the 16th Cavalry on 12 May 1970.

== Coat of arms ==
- Shield

Or a bordure Vert, on a chevron Azure 16 mullets pierced of the field; on a canton embattled (for the 6th Cavalry) Vert (for the 3d Cavalry) a staff erect attached thereto a standard flotant Or charged with a horseshoe, heels upward encircling the Arabic numeral "14" Sable (for the 14th Cavalry).

- Crest

On a wreath of the colors a rattlesnake coiled to strike Proper. Motto STRIKE HARD.

- Symbolism

The regiment was constituted in 1916 and organized with personnel from the 3rd, 6th and 14th Cavalry which are shown on the canton. Green was the color of the facings of the Mounted Rifles, now the 3rd Cavalry; the embattled partition line commemorates the first engagement of the 6th Cavalry when it assaulted artillery in earthworks at Williamsburg in 1862. The shield is yellow (Or), the Cavalry color; the blue chevron is for the old blue uniform, the 16 mullets (spur rowels) indicating both the numerical designation as well as mounted service. The green border and the rattlesnake crest symbolize the birth and subsequent service of the organization on the Mexican Border. The motto has a direct reference to the crest.

- Background

The coat of arms was originally approved for the 16th Cavalry on 12 February 1924. It was redesignated for the 16th Cavalry Regiment (Mechanized) on 22 August 1942. It was redesignated for the 16th Cavalry Reconnaissance Squadron, Mechanized, on 5 April 1944. The coat of arms was redesignated for the 16th Cavalry on 28 October 1958. It was amended to correct the symbolism on 23 June 1960. It was redesignated for the 16th Armor on 22 August 1968. The coat of arms was redesignated for the 16th Cavalry on 12 May 1970.

== See also ==
- List of armored and cavalry regiments of the United States Army
