= Excellence in Armor =

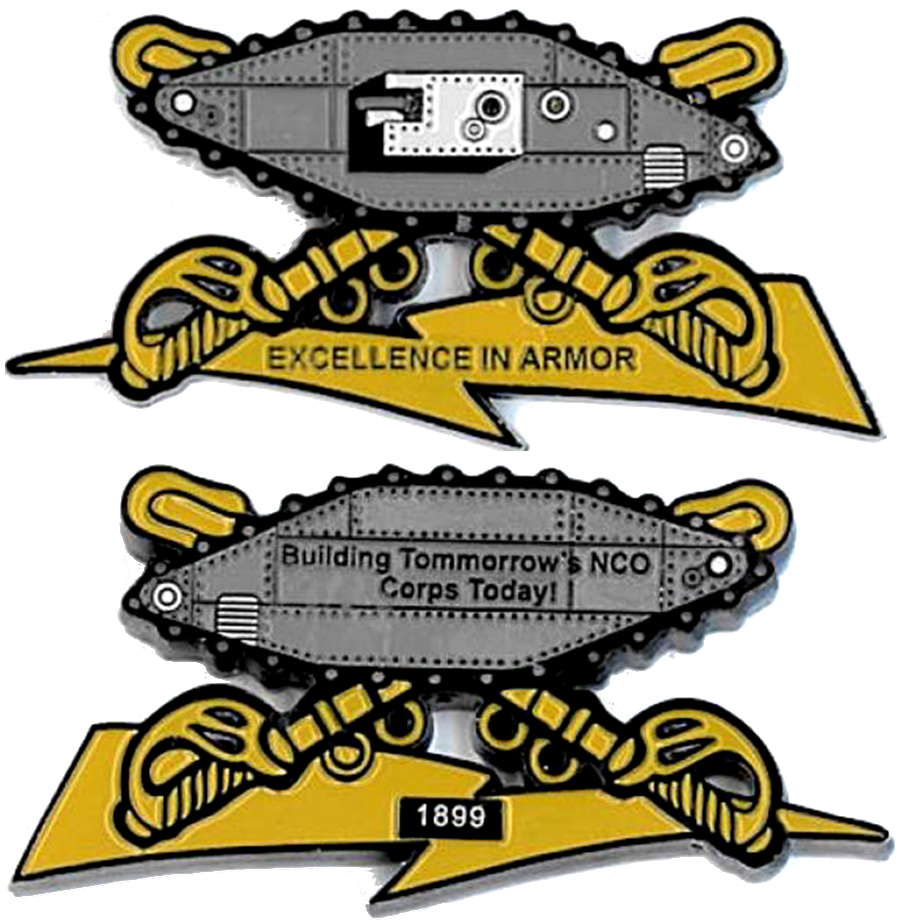
Excellence in Armor award coin (top=obverse, bottom=reverse)

Excellence in Armor (EIA) is a program of the United States Army Training and Doctrine Command that awards outstanding Armor and Cavalry Soldiers whose performance is routinely above the standard and demonstrate superior leadership potential. The EIA was initially proposed in May 1984 and implemented in October 1987. The program rewards outstanding armor and cavalry soldiers with a Certificate of Achievement, a challenge coin from the U.S. Army's Chief of Armor, awarding of the personnel development skill identifier (PDSI) “E4J,” and will set the soldier apart from their peers during promotion boards.

According to U.S. Army Armor School, the EIA program identifies outstanding Armor Branch soldiers in the ranks of Private (E-1/OR-1) through Sergeant (E-5/OR-5) and 2nd Lieutenant (O-1/OF-1a) through Captain (O-3/OF-3) who have demonstrated performance and leadership potential in One Station Unit Training (OSUT) or Armor Basic Officer Leaders Course (ABOLC) under the auspices of the 194th Armored and 316th Cavalry Brigades of the U.S. Army Armor School. Other Armor Branch soldiers who have earned the Expert Soldier Badge can also earn the EIA by submitting a request to the U.S. Army Armor School.

One of the established goals of the program is to "increase combat readiness across Armor and Cavalry units through identification and promotion of highly qualified highly motivated armor and cavalry soldiers."
