= Fort Knox =

United States Army post in Kentucky, United States

- Kentucky

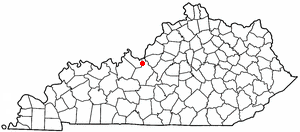
- Location of Fort Knox in Kentucky

Site information
- Type: Military base
- Controlled by: 1861–1865: Contested; 1865–present: United States
- Website: home.army.mil/knox/

Location
- Coordinates: 37.90°N 85.95°W

Site history
- Built: 1918
- In use: 1861–1865: Civil War; 1865–1903: Settlement; 1903–1918: Training grounds; 1918–1925: Camp Knox; 1925–1928: National Forest; 1928–1931: Camp Knox; 1932–present: Fort Knox

Garrison information
- Current commander: Col. Christopher J. Ricci; Fort Knox Garrison Commander
- Occupants: Brig. Gen. Sean Crockett; Commanding General, Fort Knox

Fort Knox is a United States Army installation in Kentucky, south of Louisville and north of Elizabethtown. It is adjacent to the United States Bullion Depository (also known as Fort Knox), which is used to house a large portion of the United States' official gold reserves.

The 109,000-acre (170 sq mi; 440 km^{2}) base covers parts of Bullitt, Hardin and Meade counties. It currently holds the Army Human Resources Center of Excellence, including the Army Human Resources Command. It is named in honor of Henry Knox, Chief of Artillery in the American Revolutionary War and the first United States secretary of war.

For 60 years, Fort Knox was the home of the U.S. Army Armor Center and School, and was used by both the Army and the Marine Corps to train crews on the American tanks of the day; the last was the M1 Abrams main battle tank. The history of the U.S. Army's Cavalry and Armored forces, and of General George S. Patton's career, is shown at the General George Patton Museum on the grounds of Fort Knox.

In 2011, the U.S. Army Armor School moved to Fort Benning, Georgia, where the Infantry School is also based. In 2014, the U.S. Army Cadet Command relocated to Fort Knox and all summer training for ROTC cadets now takes place there.

On 16 October 2020, V Corps was reactivated at Fort Knox, just over seven years after the colors were last cased in Wiesbaden, Germany, in July 2013.

== Bullion depository ==
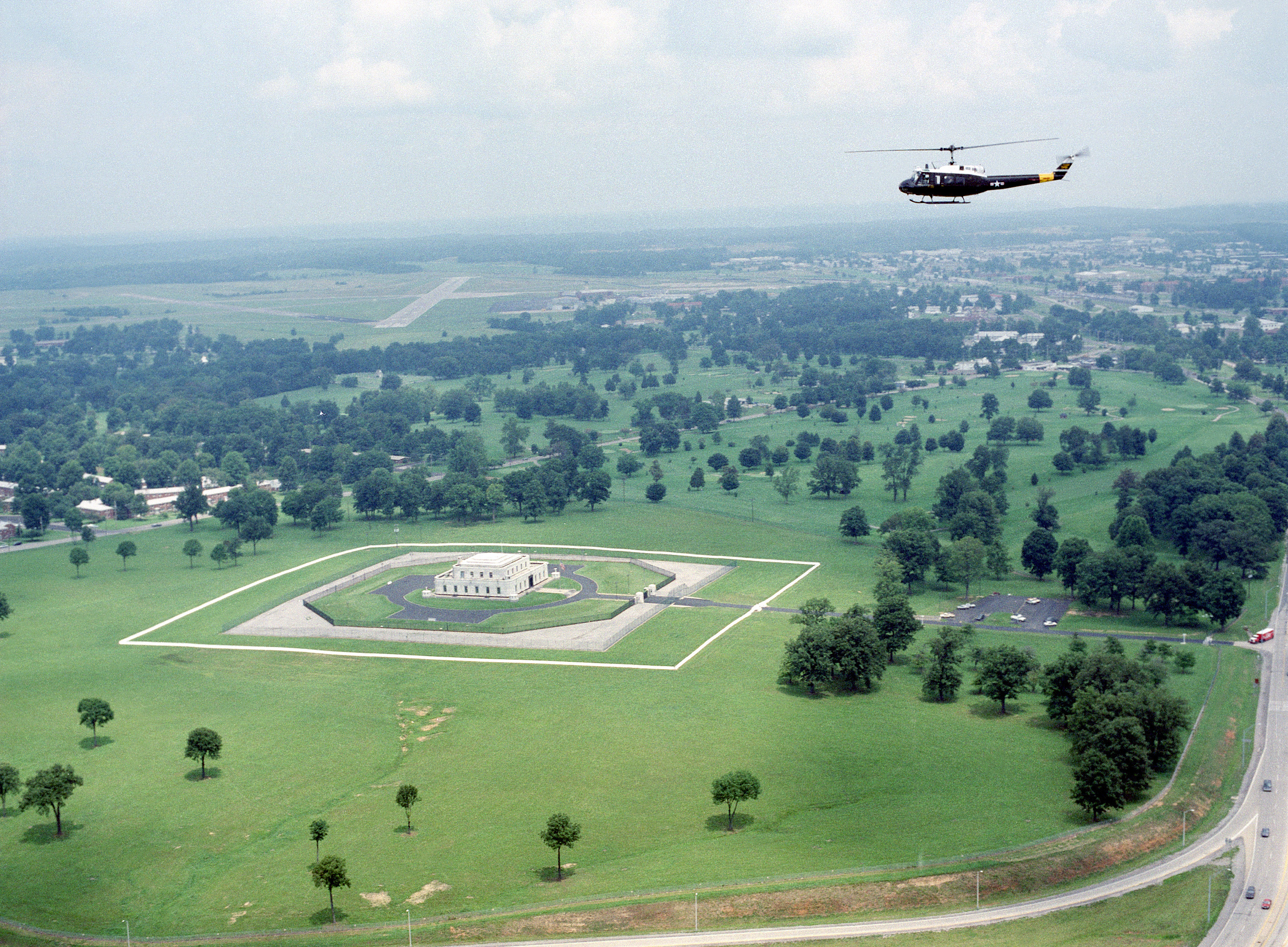
Aerial view of the Bullion Depository. Godman Army Airfield can be seen in the background.

The United States Bullion Depository, often known as Fort Knox, is a fortified vault building adjacent to the Fort Knox Army Post. It is operated by the United States Department of the Treasury, and stores over half the country's gold reserves. It is protected by the United States Mint Police, and is well known for its physical security.

The depository was built by the Treasury in 1936 on land transferred to it from Fort Knox. Early shipments of gold totaling almost 13,000 metric tons were escorted by combat cars of the 1st U.S. Cavalry Regiment to the depository. It has in the past safeguarded other precious items, such as the original copies of both the Constitution of the United States and the United States Declaration of Independence.

== Census-designated place ==
Parts of the base in Hardin and Meade counties form a census-designated place (CDP), which had a population of 12,377 at the 2000 census, 10,124 at the 2010 census, and 7,742 at the 2020 census.

== Commemorations ==
The General George Patton Museum of Leadership at Fort Knox includes an exhibit "highlighting leadership issues" that arose from the attacks of 11 September 2001; the exhibit includes two firetrucks, one of which, designated "Foam 161", was partially charred and melted in the attack upon the Pentagon.

Fort Knox is also the location of the United States Army's Human Resources Command's Timothy Maude Center of Excellence, named in honor of Lieutenant General Timothy Maude, the highest-ranking member of the U.S. military to die in the attacks of 11 September 2001.

== History ==
=== Fortification ===
Fortifications were constructed near the site in 1861, during the Civil War when Fort Duffield was constructed. Fort Duffield was located on what was known as Muldraugh Hill on a strategic point overlooking the confluence of the Salt and Ohio Rivers and the Louisville and Nashville Turnpike. The area was contested by both Union and Confederate forces. Bands of organized guerrillas frequently raided the area during the war. John Hunt Morgan and the 2nd Kentucky Cavalry Regiment of the Confederate Army raided the area before staging his infamous raid across Indiana and Ohio.

=== Post Civil War ===
After the Civil War, the area now occupied by the Army was home to various small communities. In October 1903, military maneuvers for the Regular Army and the National Guards of several states were held at West Point, Kentucky, and the surrounding area. In April 1918, field artillery units from Camp Zachary Taylor arrived at West Point for training. 20,000 acres (8,100 ha) near the village of Stithton were leased to the government and construction for a permanent training center was started in July 1918.

=== New camp ===
The new camp was named after Henry Knox, the Continental Army's chief of artillery during the Revolutionary War and the country's first secretary of war. The camp was extended by the purchase of a further 40,000 acres (16,000 ha) in June 1918 and construction properly began in July 1918. The building program was reduced following the end of the war and reduced further following cuts to the army in 1921 after the National Defense Act of 1920. The camp was greatly reduced and became a semi-permanent training center for the 5th Corps Area for Reserve Officer training, the National Guard, and Citizen's Military Training Camps (CMTC). For a short while, from 1925 to 1928, the area was designated as "Camp Henry Knox National Forest."

=== Air Corps use ===
The post contains Godman Army Airfield, which was used by the United States Army Air Corps and its successor, the United States Army Air Forces, as a training base during World War II. It was used by the Kentucky Air National Guard for several years after the war until they relocated to Standiford Field in Louisville. The airfield is still used by the United States Army Aviation Branch.

=== Protection of America's founding documents ===
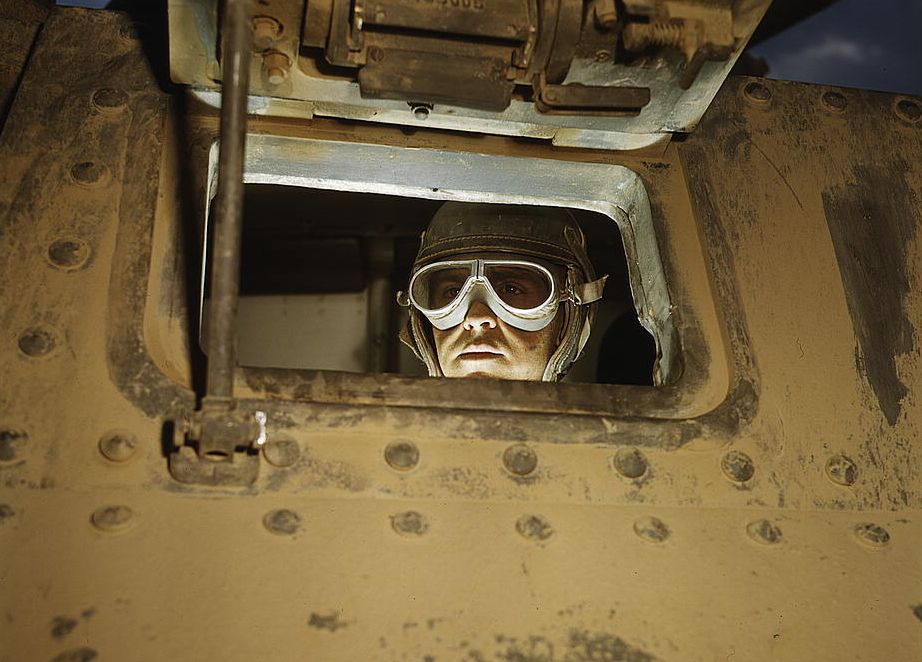
A tank driver at Fort Knox in 1942

For protection after the Japanese attack on Pearl Harbor in 1941, the Declaration of Independence, the Constitution of the United States and the Gettysburg Address were moved for safekeeping to the United States Bullion Depository until Major W. C. Hatfield ordered their release after the D-Day Landings on 19 September 1944.

=== Mechanized military unit occupation ===
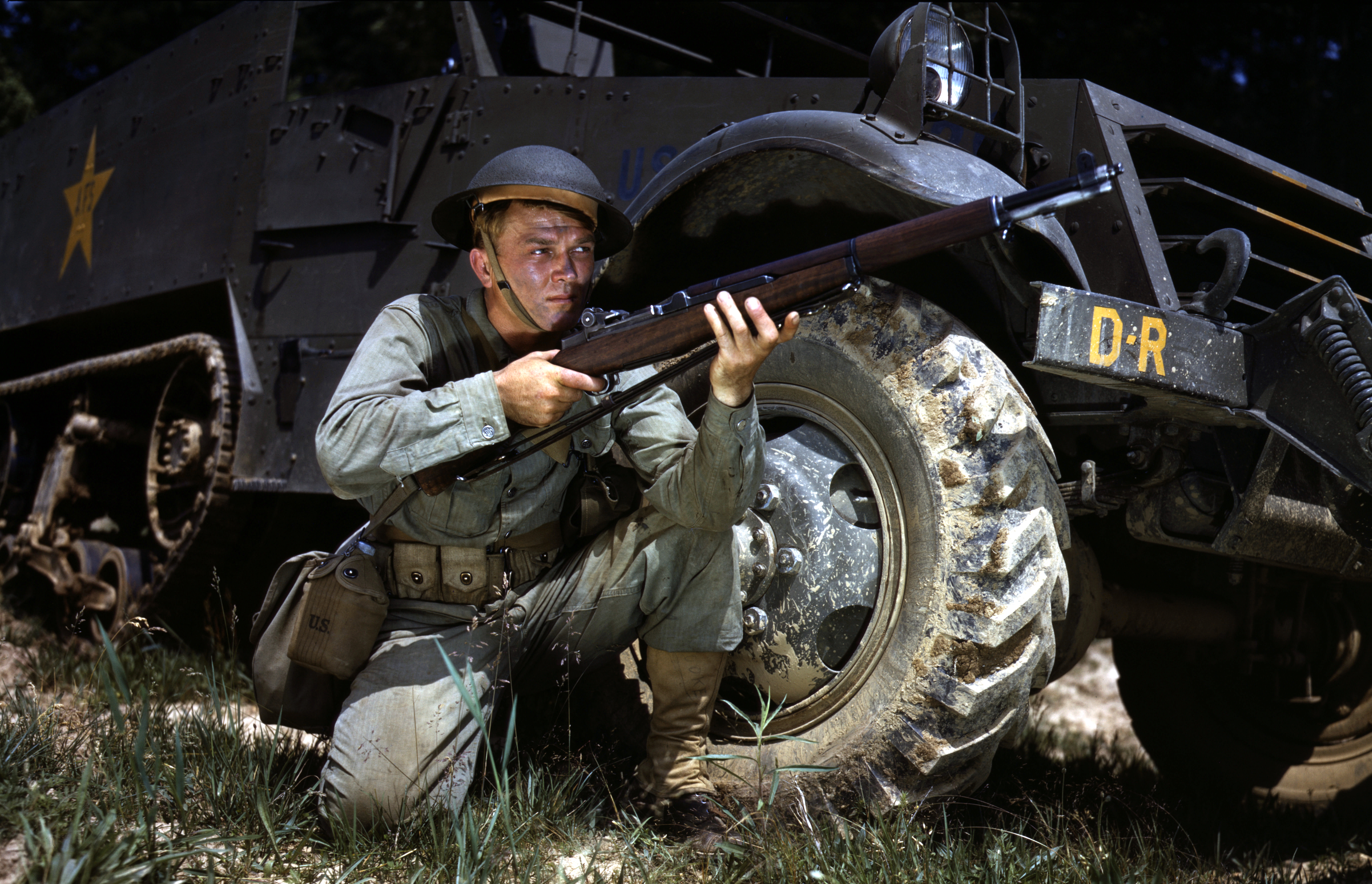
Infantryman wearing Brodie helmet, kneeling in front of M3 Half-track, holds an M1 Garand rifle. Fort Knox, June 1942

In 1931 a small force of the mechanized cavalry was assigned to Camp Knox to use it as a training site. The camp was turned into a permanent garrison in January 1932 and renamed Fort Knox. The 1st Cavalry Regiment arrived later in the month to become the 1st Cavalry Regiment (Mechanized).

In 1936 the 1st was joined by the 13th to become the 7th Cavalry Brigade (Mechanized). The site quickly became the center for mechanization tactics and doctrine. The success of the German mechanized units at the start of World War II was a major impetus to operations at the fort. A new Armored Force was established in July 1940 with its headquarters at Fort Knox with the 7th Cavalry Brigade becoming the 1st Armored Division.

The Armored Force School and the Armored Force Replacement Center were also sited at Fort Knox in October 1940, and their successors remained there until 2011, when the Armor School moved to Fort Benning, Georgia. The site was expanded to cope with its new role. By 1943, there were 3,820 buildings on 106,861 acres (43,245 ha). A third of the post has been torn down within the last ten years, with another third slated by 2010.

=== 1947 Universal Military Training Experimental Unit ===
In 1947, Fort Knox hosted the Universal Military Training Experimental Unit, a six-month project that aimed to demonstrate the feasibility and effectiveness of providing new 18–20 year-old Army recruits with basic military training that emphasized physical, mental, and spiritual well-being. This project was undertaken with the aim of persuading the public to support President Harry S. Truman's proposal to require all eligible American men to undergo universal military training.

Stripes (1981) was filmed using the exterior of Fort Knox but did not show the inside of the facility for security reasons.

=== 1993 shooting ===
On 18 October 1993, Arthur Hill went on a shooting rampage, killing three and wounding two more before attempting to take his own life, Hill shot and severely wounded himself. The shooting occurred at Fort Knox's Training Support Center. Prior to the incident, Hill's coworkers claimed they were afraid of being around a mentally unstable person who was at work. Hill died on 21 October of complications from his attempted suicide.

=== 2013 shooting ===
On 3 April 2013, a civilian employee was shot and killed in a parking lot on post. The victim was an employee of the United States Army Human Resources Command and was transported to the Ireland Army Community Hospital, where he was pronounced dead. This shooting caused a temporary lockdown that was lifted around 7 p.m. the same day. U.S. Army Sgt. Marquinta E. Jacobs, a soldier stationed at Fort Knox, was charged on 4 April with the shooting. Jacobs pleaded guilty to charges of premeditated murder and aggravated assault, and was sentenced to 30 years in prison on 10 January 2014.

== Human Resources Command ==
The Army Human Resources Command Center relocated to Fort Knox from the Washington D.C./Virginia area beginning in 2009. New facilities are under construction throughout Fort Knox, such as the new Army Human Resource Center, the largest construction project in Fort Knox's history. It is a $185 million, three-story, 880,000-square-foot (82,000 m^{2}) complex of six interconnected buildings, occupying 104 acres (42 ha).

In May 2010, The Human Resource Center of Excellence, the largest office building in the state, opened at Fort Knox. It employs nearly 4,300 soldiers and civilians.

== Education ==
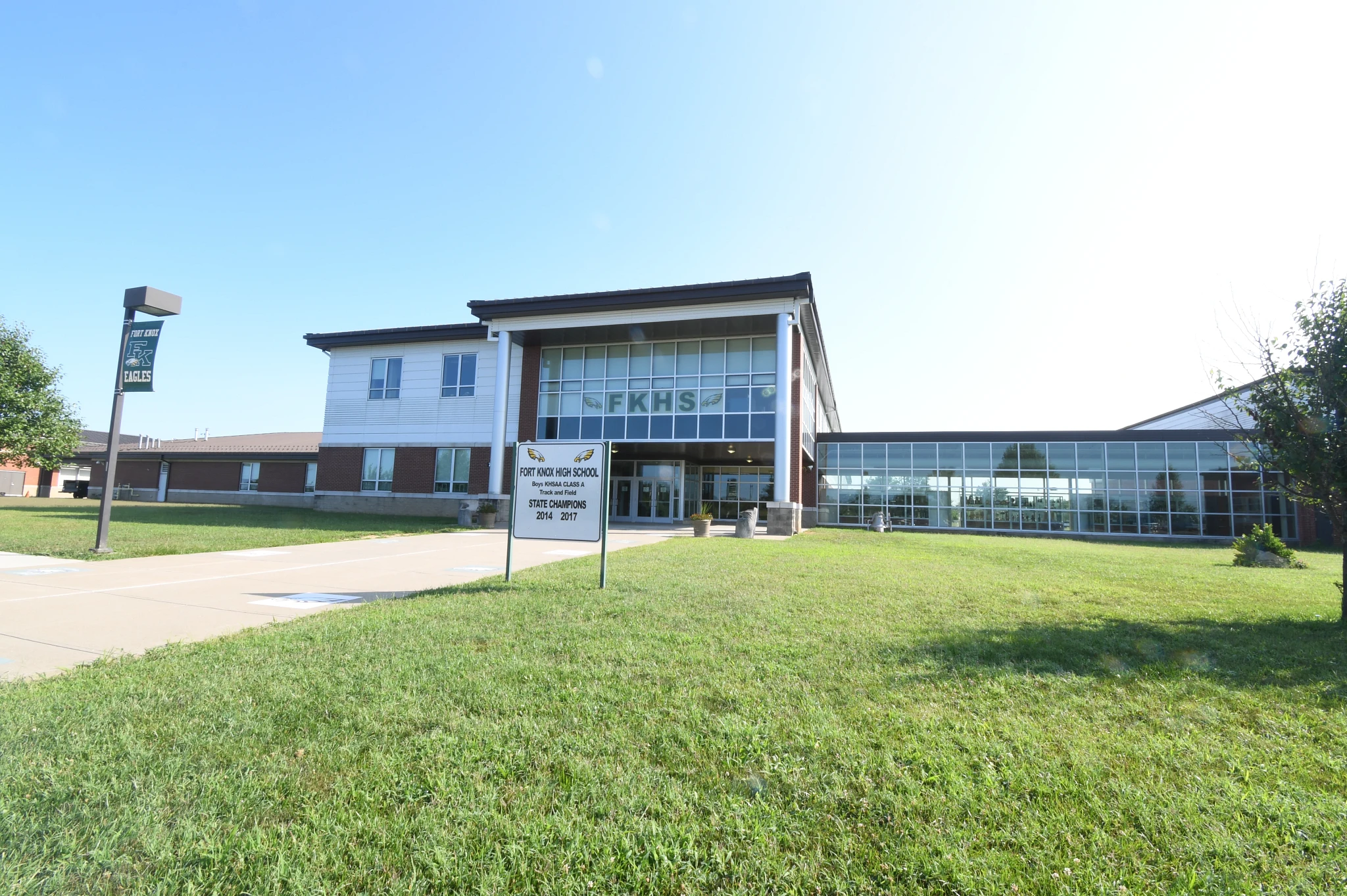
Fort Knox Middle High School

The Department of Defense Education Activity (DoDEA) operates on-post public schools for all sections of the property. They are:

- Kingsolver Elementary School (Pre-Kindergarten–Grade 5)
- Van Voorhis Elementary School (Pre-Kindergarten–Grade 5)
- Scott Intermediate School (Grades 6–8)
- Fort Knox Middle High School (Grades 9–12)

The secondary school, formerly Fort Knox High School, was built in 1958 and has undergone only a handful of renovations since then, including a new building which was completed in 2007.

Crittenberger Elementary School was formerly in Fort Knox.

== Units and tenants ==
=== Current ===
- V Corps
- United States Army Recruiting Command (Fort Knox Senior Commander as of October 2022)
  - U.S. Army Recruiting Division
  - U.S. Army 3rd Recruiting Brigade
  - U.S. Army Medical Recruiting Brigade
  - U.S. Army Marketing and Engagement Brigade
  - U.S. Army Recruiting and Retention College
- United States Army Cadet Command
- United States Army Human Resources Command
- First Army Division East
  - 4th Cavalry Brigade
- 1st Sustainment Command (Theater)
- 84th Training Command
- 100th Training Division (Leader Development)
  - 83rd U.S. Army Reserve Readiness Training Center
- U.S. Army Garrison Fort Knox
- Army Reserve Aviation Command
- Army Reserve Careers Group
- 100th Army Band
- Ireland Army Health Clinic
- U.S. Army Cadet Command Law Enforcement Activity
  - 905th Military Working Dogs

=== Previous ===
- 3rd Sustainment Command (Expeditionary) (reassigned 2015 to Fort Bragg, North Carolina)
- 1st Armor Training Brigade (Cadre) (inactivated 2010)
- 3rd Brigade, 1st Infantry Division (inactivated 2014)
- 16th Cavalry Regiment (inactivated 2010; 1st, 2nd, and 3rd Squadrons reassigned under the 316th Cavalry Brigade)
- 316th Cavalry Brigade (reassigned 2011 to Fort Benning, Georgia)
- 194th Armored Brigade (reassigned 2011 to Fort Benning, Georgia)
  - 7th Squadron (Air), 1st Cavalry Regiment (inactivated 1976)
  - 81st Armored Regiment
  - 15th Cavalry Regiment
  - 46th Infantry Regiment
- 477th Bombardment Group (reassigned 1946 to Lockbourne Army Airfield, Ohio)
- 46th Adjutant General Battalion (Reception) (inactivated 2011)
- 113th Army Band (inactivated 2016)

== Geography ==
Fort Knox is located at 37°54'09.96" North, 85°57'09.11" West, along the Ohio River. The depository itself is located at 37°52'59.59" North, 85°57'55.31" West.

According to the Census Bureau, the base CDP has a total area of 20.94 square miles (54.23 km^{2}), of which 20.92 sq mi (54.18 km^{2}) is land and 0.03 sq mi (0.08 km^{2})—0.14%—is water. Communities near Fort Knox include Brandenburg, Elizabethtown, Hodgenville, Louisville, Radcliff, Shepherdsville, and Vine Grove, Kentucky. The Meade County city of Muldraugh is completely surrounded by Fort Knox.

=== Climate ===
The climate in this area is characterized by hot, humid summers and generally mild to cool winters. According to the Köppen Climate Classification system, Fort Knox has a humid subtropical climate, abbreviated "Cfa" on climate maps.

== Demographics ==
Historical population
| Census | Pop. | Note | %± |
|---|---|---|---|
| 2020 | 7,742 | | — |
U.S. Decennial Census

As of the census of 2000, there were 12,377 people, 2,748 households, and 2,596 families residing on base. The population density was 591.7 inhabitants per square mile (228.5/km^{2}). There were 3,015 housing units at an average density of 144.1/sq mi (55.6/km^{2}). The racial makeup of the base was 66.3% White, 23.1% African American, 0.7% Native American, 1.7% Asian, 0.4% Pacific Islander, 4.3% from other races, and 3.6% from two or more races. Hispanics or Latinos of any race were 10.4% of the population.

There were 2,748 households, out of which 77.7% had children under the age of 18 living with them, 86.0% were married couples living together, 6.1% had a female householder with no husband present, and 5.5% were non-families. 4.9% of all households were made up of individuals, and 0.1% had someone living alone who was 65 years of age or older. The average household size was 3.49 and the average family size was 3.60.

The age distribution was 34.9% under the age of 18, 25.5% from 18 to 24, 37.2% from 25 to 44, 2.3% from 45 to 64, and 0.1% who were 65 years of age or older. The median age was 22 years. For every 100 females, there were 155.7 males. For every 100 females age 18 and over, there were 190.3 males. These statistics are generally typical for military bases.

The median income for a household on the base was US$34,020, and the median income for a family was $33,588. Males had a median income of $26,011 versus $21,048 for females. The per capita income for the base was $12,410. About 5.8% of the population and 6.6% of the population were below the poverty line, including 7.6% of those under the age of 18 and 100.0% of those 65 and older.

== See also ==
- Elizabethtown metropolitan area
- Louisville metropolitan area
- Goldfinger (film)
- List of attractions and events in the Louisville metropolitan area
- List of World War II military service football teams
- List of World War II prisoner-of-war camps in the United States
