= United States Army Armor School =

U.S. Army school dedicated to training in armored warfare

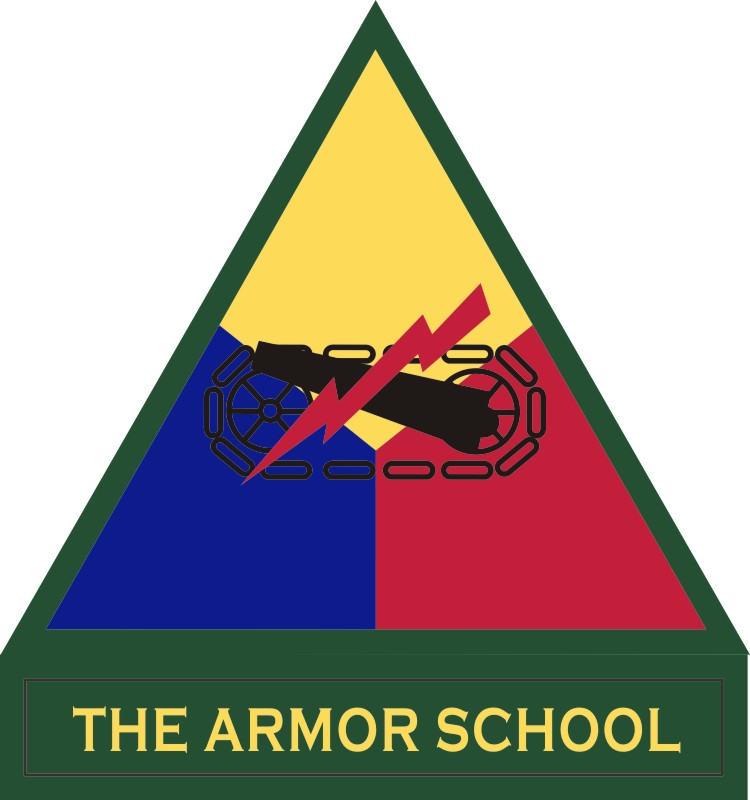
- US Army Armor School shoulder sleeve insignia
- Founded: 1940 - present
- Country: United States
- Allegiance: United States Army Transformation and Training Command
- Branch: United States Army
- Type: School
- Role: Armor and Cavalry Training
- Part of: Maneuver Center of Excellence
- Garrison/HQ: Fort Benning, Georgia
- Motto: "Forge the Thunderbolt"
- Colors: Blue, Red, Yellow
- Anniversaries: October 1, 1940

Commanders
- Commandant: BG Kevin D. Bradley
- Command Sergeant Major: CSM Ryan Roush

Insignia
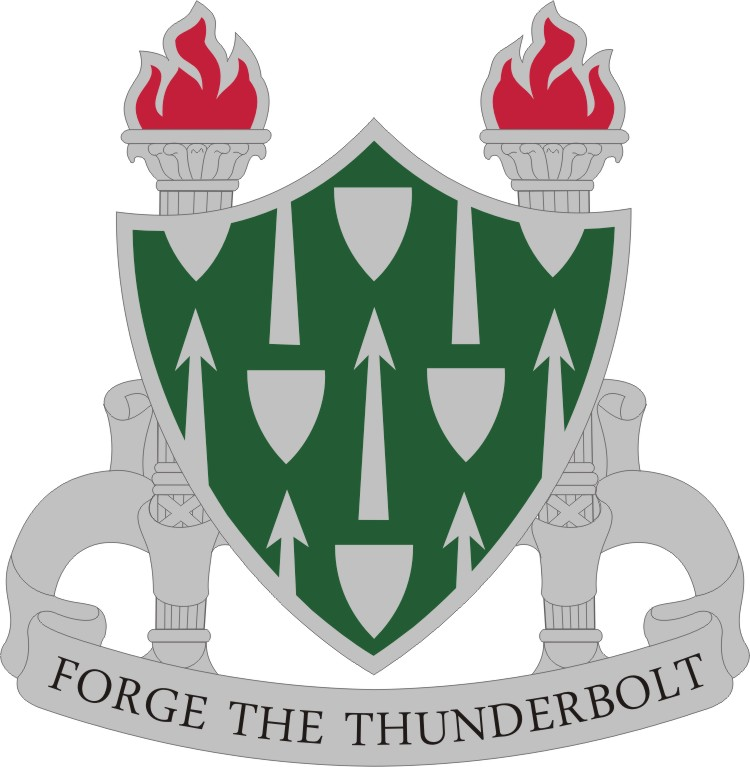
- Distinctive unit insignia

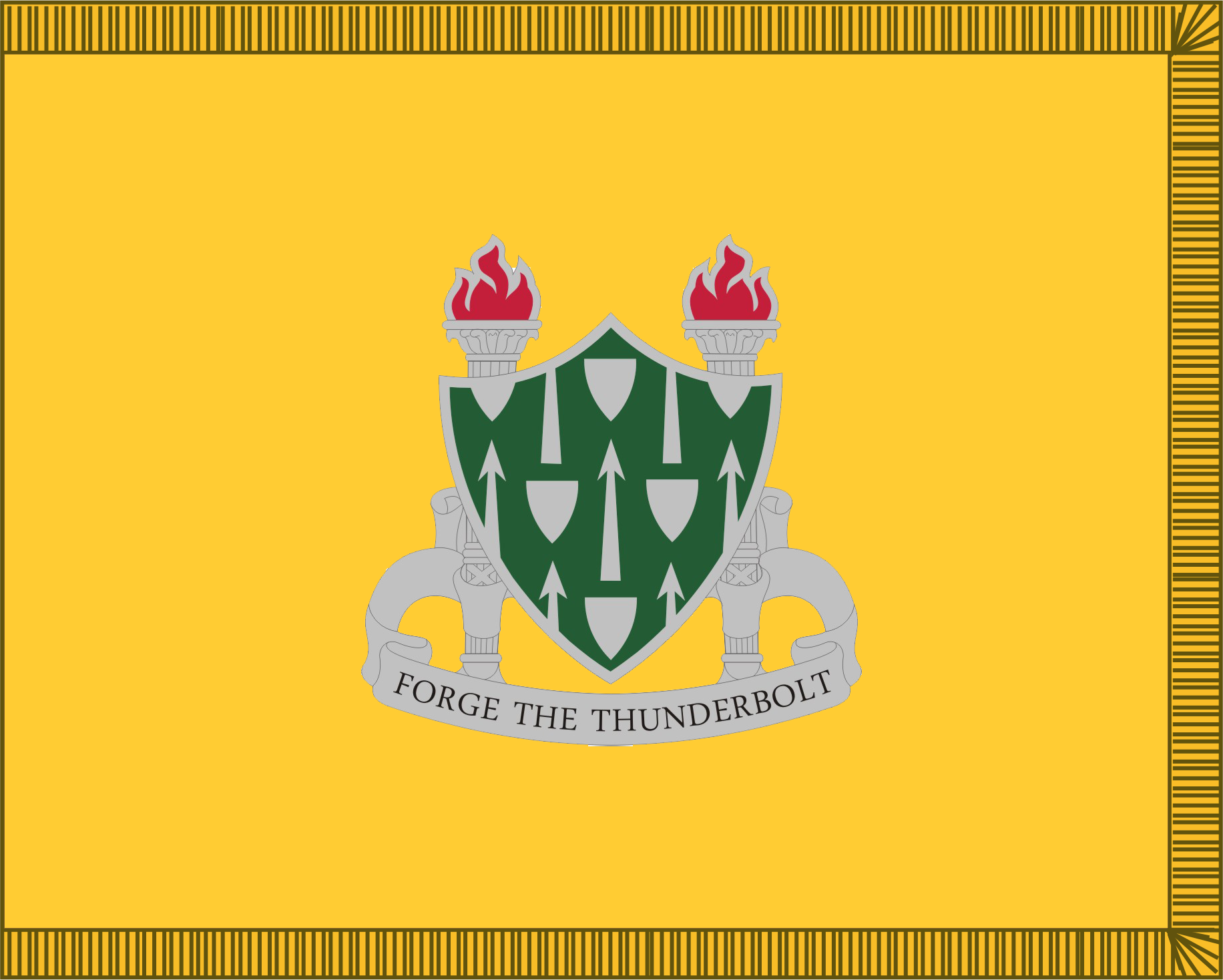
- US Army Armor School Flag

The United States Army Armor School (USAARMS) (formerly Armored Force School) is a military training school located at Fort Benning, Georgia. Its primary focus is the training of United States Army soldiers, non-commissioned officers, warrant officers, and commissioned officers. It also trains for equipment handling, including the M1 Abrams, the Bradley Fighting Vehicle, and the Stryker Mobile Gun System. The Armor School moved to Fort Benning in 2010 as part of the United States Base Realignment and Closure program.

The school was supervised by Continental Army Command until the 1970s, then up until 2025, it was part of United States Army Training and Doctrine Command.

== History ==
The United States Army Armor School was established on October 1, 1940, in Fort Knox, Kentucky, with the first class starting November 4th of the same year. The school was established by then–Lieutenant Colonel Stephen G. Henry under the guidance of Brigadier General Adna R. Chaffee Jr., for whom the headquarters building is now named. On July 1, 1957, the school was given its current name. It originally consisted of seven departments: Tank, Wheeled vehicle, Motorcycle, Communication, Tactics, Gunnery, and Field Engineering.

== 194th Armored Brigade—Programs of Instruction ==
The 194th Armored Brigade is focused on developing soldiers in initial entry training—led by Drill Sergeants—and advanced armor and cavalry training via subject matter expert instructors. The brigade conducts training including One Station Unit Training (OSUT), Basic Combat Training (BCT), and Advanced Individual Training (AIT) for the following U.S. Army career fields:

- Armor Crewman (19K)
- Cavalry Scouts (19D)
- M1A2 SEPv2 Abrams System Maintainer (91A)
- Bradley Fighting Vehicle System "Maintainer" (91M)

== 316th Cavalry Brigade—Programs of Instruction ==
The 316th Cavalry Brigade educates and trains leaders serving in all components throughout the U.S. Army to operate in critical assignments, in order to increase maneuver units' ability to fight as part of a combined arms team and deliver direct fires effectively on the battlefield. The brigade is responsible for conducting the following course for the U.S. Army, U.S. Marine Corps, and some international military students:

=== Armor Basic Officer Leaders Course ===
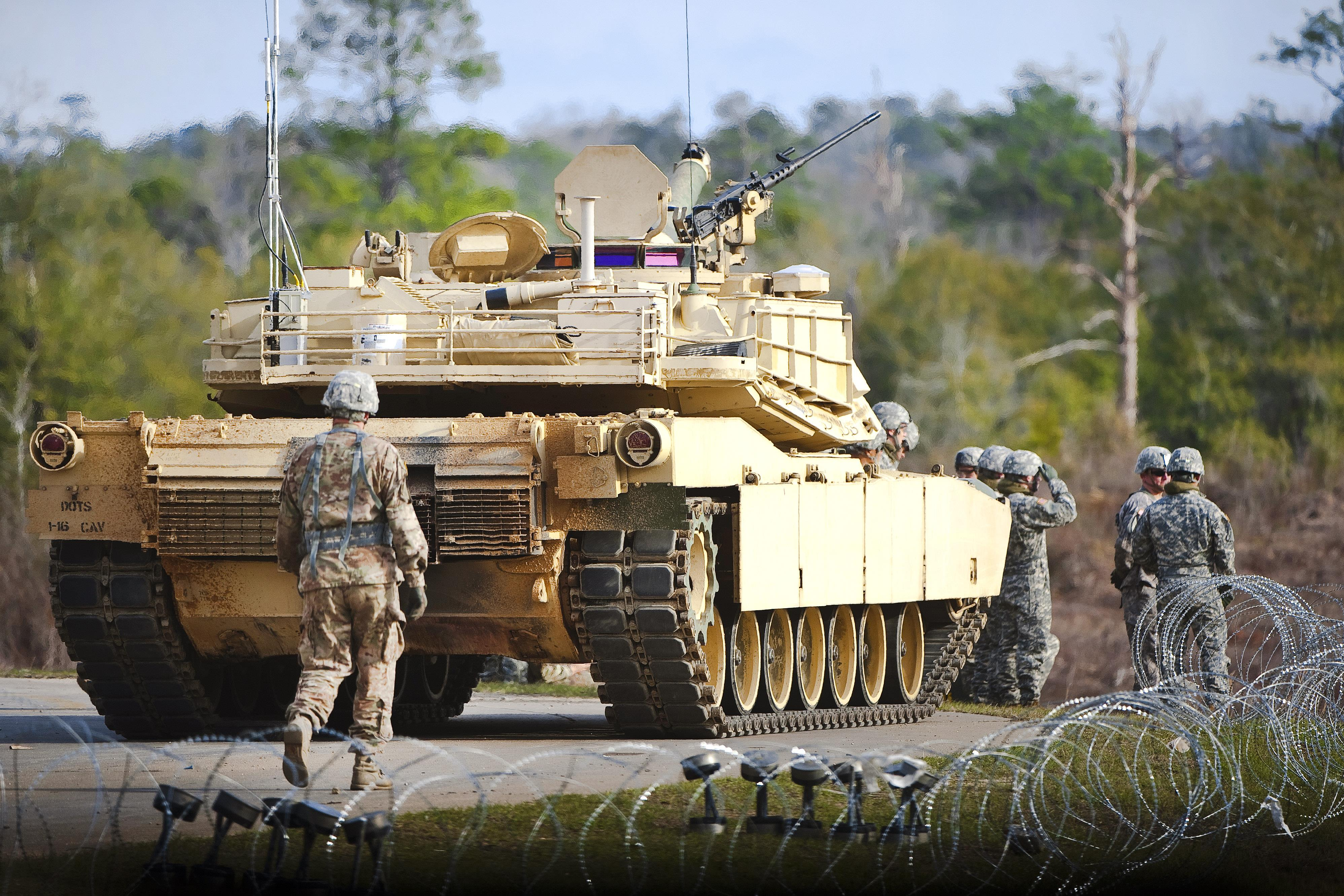
Officers in the ABOLC prepare an M1A2 for live-fire training at Ft. Benning.

The Armor Basic Officer Leaders Course (ABOLC) is the introductory skills course for United States Army Cavalry and Armor Second and First Lieutenants. These officers (all recent graduates of the United States Military Academy, Army Reserve Officers' Training Corps, and Officer Candidate School) receive 19 weeks of training in basic leadership skills, maneuver and firepower tactics, gunnery, platoon and company level strategy, and strategic and tactical planning. The purpose of ABOLC is to produce armor officers capable of decisive and effective operations to lead a tank platoon in support of a combined arms team.

=== Cavalry Leaders Course ===
The Cavalry Leaders Course trains officers, warrant officers, and non-commissioned Officers (NCOs) who are involved in the planning and execution of reconnaissance collection and tactical security tasks at the Troop and Squadron level, as well as joint asset planners and operators who help support ground operations. Students focus on applying the fundamentals of reconnaissance and security, as well as established doctrine and TTPs, into the planning of various high intensity and counter insurgency operations in time constrained environments.

=== Maneuver Leaders Maintenance Course ===
The Maneuver Leaders Maintenance Course (MLMC) is a ten-day course designed to develop maneuver leaders expertise in battalion and small unit level maintenance operations. Students are taught maintenance fundamentals and how to administer a command maintenance program with a focus on Preventative Maintenance Checks and Services (PMCS) and 5988E flow. In addition, they learn to execute command maintenance and a Commander's Inspection Program (CIP) for maintenance in accordance with U.S. Army specifications. Additional instruction focuses on maintenance information systems, that is, how battalion/squadron level systems interface with higher level maintenance organizations and Global Combat Support System-Army (GCSS-A) to order repair parts for the battalion/squadron. Using GCSS-A, students track and account for all battalion/squadron level materiel readiness financial resources. Students learn to assess materiel readiness issues using business intelligence and business warehouse tools. Students learn to apply AR 750-1 to determine the effectiveness of a Command Maintenance Discipline Program (CMDP). Students also learn to conduct maintenance in the tactical environment including, but not limited to recovery operations and the planning considerations for Unit-Maintenance Collection Point (UMCP) emplacement.

=== Scout Leader's Course ===
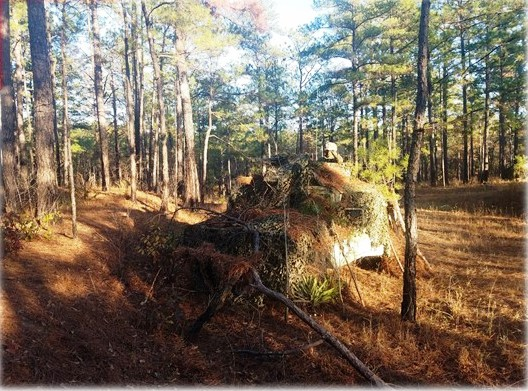
Soldiers practice vehicle concealment and observation in the woods of Ft. Benning.

The Scout Leader's Course (formerly the Army Reconnaissance Course or ARC) is designed to train reconnaissance, security leaders and develop advanced skills of R&S. They develop their skills to better understand the commander's information requirements, to communicate battlefield information, and to develop understanding of employing supporting assets while maneuvering a scout platoon in a combined arms unit.

=== Simulations Training Management Course ===
The Simulations Training Management Course (STMC) trains soldiers assigned to armor brigade combat teams and Stryker brigade combat teams to manage simulation training for stabilized and mounted machine gun platforms. Initial training includes mounted machine gun gunnery scenario development utilizing the Engagement Skills Trainer (EST). The second training module cover AGTS, MGS AGTS, and COFT-SA manager's functions, track crew progression, system troubleshooting, and PAAR capabilities or VBS3 scenario development based on platform specific student needs. The final module covers unit training plans and exportable training packages certifying students to train peers and subordinates at their home station.

=== Advanced Situational Awareness Course ===
The Advanced Situational Awareness (ASA) Course curriculum focuses on teaching students to integrate the six domains of human behavior into training and combat; and to demonstrate how they can be applied to enhance the Squads ability to achieve overmatch in a universal operational environment. This is accomplished by placing students in classroom and field environments, and presenting them with experiential based, predictive, tactical based, problem solving situations. ASA focuses on:

- Integrate ASA principles and Human Behavior Pattern Recognition and Analysis (HBPR & A) problem-solving into training and combat operations
- Mitigate insider threats using (HBPR & A)
- Apply Human Behavior Pattern Recognition and Analysis to Soldier fitness and resilience
- Sustain ASA basic knowledge, abilities and attitudes training

=== Dismounted C-IED Tactics Master Trainer Course ===
The Dismounted Counter-Improvised Explosive devices (C-IED) Tactics Master Trainer (DCT-MT) Course is a two-week course teaching Master Trainers (MT) the foundations to become a subject matter expert in C-IED tactics. The MT will apply knowledge to assist leaders with C-IED training, planning, executing, and supervising at company and battalion level. The MT will advise unit leaders and personnel about IED threats; recommend enablers to mitigate IED threats; incorporate C-IED TTPs into the unit training plan; conduct a company level C-IED training program.

=== Tank Commander's Course ===
The Tank Commander's Course (TCC) focuses on technical rather than tactical instruction. The instruction includes crew stations and duties, tank maintenance, unit gunnery management, bore sighting, armor accuracy checks, plumb and synchronization, tank ammunition and weapons, screening, and tank gunnery. Students are trained using conventional training methods, stand-alone training devices, and simulators. The course is a gunnery systems intensive functional course that trains the soldier to function as an M1A1 or M1A2 SEP tank commander.

=== Mobile Gun System Commander's Course ===
The Mobile Gun System Commander's Course (MGSCC) is designed to train officers and non-commissioned officers to be technically and tactically proficient on the Stryker Mobile Gun System (MGS). The MGS Commander's Course is designed to produce leaders that are fully qualified as an MGS Commander, with the technical and tactical knowledge to maintain and employ the MGS in a combat environment.

=== Master Gunner Common Core ===
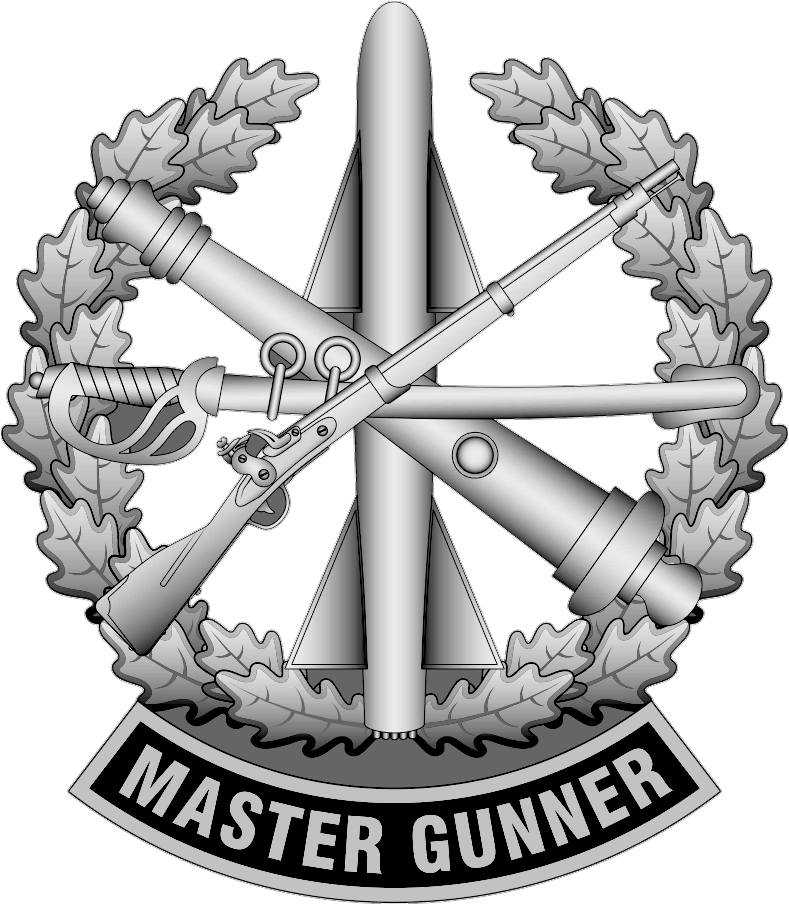
The Master Gunner Identification Badge is awarded to soldiers who complete one of the U.S. Army's master gunner courses.

The Master Gunner Common Core (MGCC) trains non-commissioned officers on

** advanced universal gunnery methodologies,

** gunnery training with a focus on vehicle mounted machine gun weapons systems,

** planning and implementation of gunnery training programs.

MGCC is taught in 27 days in four modules:

1. Direct fire and weapons training
2. Ammunition and ballistics
3. Gunnery training management
4. Unit training plan

The mission of the Master Gunner is to train the unit for combat and act as subject matter expert for all weapon system platforms in the Armored Brigade Combat Team (ABCT). The Master Gunner advises commanders at all echelons, and assists with the planning, development, execution, and evaluation of all combat and gunnery-related training (individual, crew, and collective).

=== Abrams Master Gunner Course ===
The Abrams Master Gunner Course (AMG) is a thirty-nine-day course with the mission of creating Master Gunners for the U.S. Army. Four days of the course are spent in the field and the balance thirty-four days consist of classroom instruction. Students complete six exams and an all-hands-on exams with 100% accuracy. This is the most focused of the courses offered at the Armor School, with eighteen students per class and a 2:1 student to teacher ratio. It focuses on the M1A2 Abrams System Enhancement Package (SEP) Tank.

=== Bradley Master Gunner Course ===
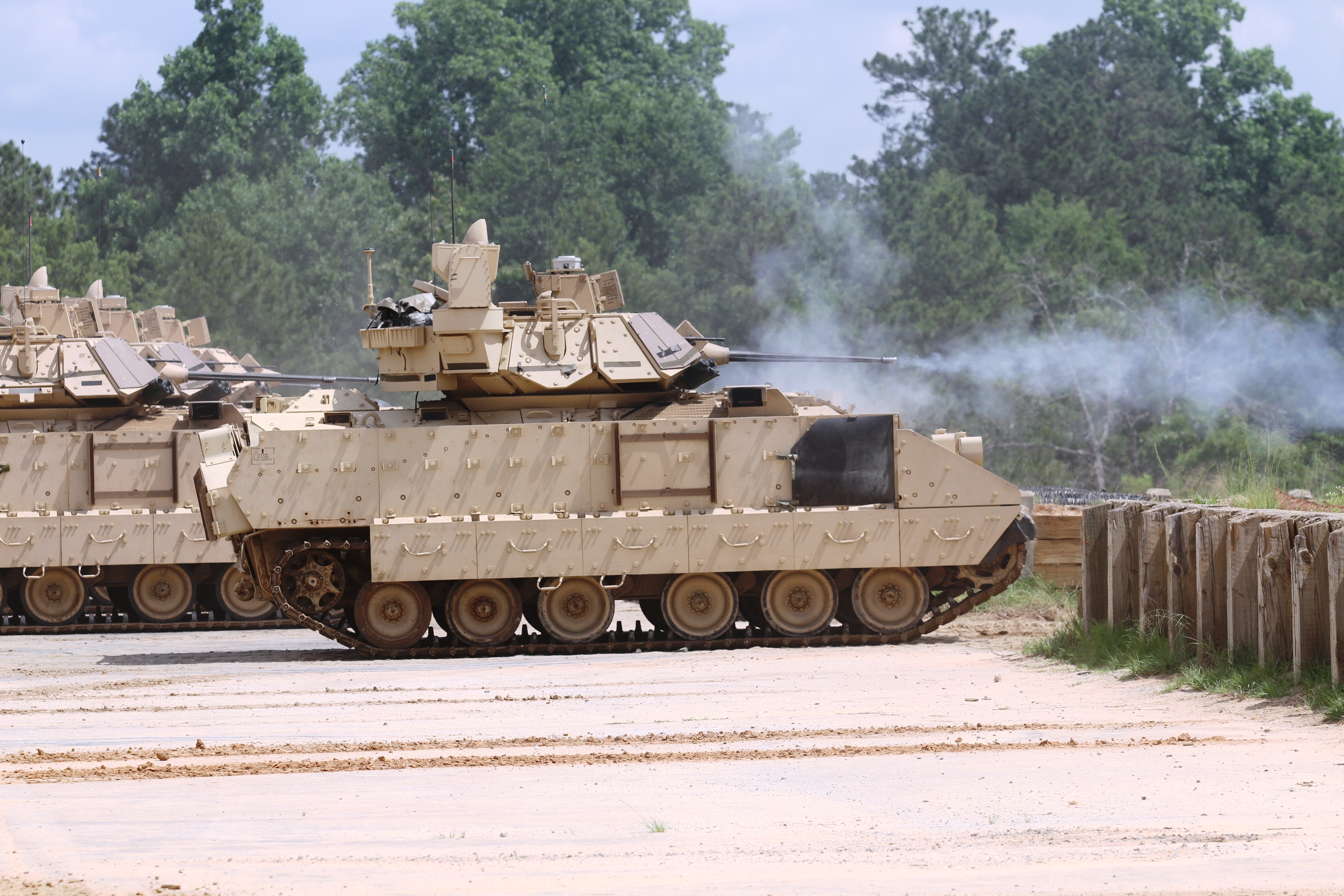
A Bradley Fighting Vehicle conducts gunnery training at Ft. Benning.

The Bradley Infantry Fighting Vehicle System Master Gunner Course (BMG) is an eight-week two-day course which utilizes small group training methodologies to train master gunners on Bradley Fighting Vehicle weapon systems maintenance and ABCT gunnery training strategies. BMG focuses on two core training requirements:

- Maintenance training, which focuses on identifying malfunctions, troubleshooting, and maintaining the Bradley Fighting Vehicle turret components
- Gunnery training, which focuses on unit training plan development and briefs, and increasing lethality in unit gunnery programs

=== Stryker Master Gunner Course ===
Stryker Master Gunner Course (SMGC) is a thirty-nine-day course. The course mission is to train select non-commissioned officers to assist unit leaders in the planning and implementation of gunnery training programs. These master gunner graduates train unit combat vehicle crews in techniques and procedures to engage the full capability of their weapon platforms in precision direct fire engagements and can support unit level maintenance on Stryker variant fire controls and weapon systems.

== Awards ==
=== Sullivan Cup—Best Tank Crew Competition ===
The competition embodies its namesake, General (Retired) Gordon R. Sullivan. General Sullivan was commissioned as an Armor officer and commanded numerous armor formations throughout his career. General Sullivan retired from the Army after more than 36 years of service, which culminated as the 32nd Chief of Staff.

The competition is an event that tests U.S. Army soldiers, U.S. Marines, and international partners in tank crew maneuver, sustainment, and gunnery skills. The Sullivan Cup provides a realistic tank crew competition that takes place within the armor force and returns the mobile protected firepower gunnery to its place in the mounted force's mindset.

=== Gainey Cup—Best Scout Squad Competition ===
The Gainey Cup is named in honor of Command Sergeant Major William "Joe" Gainey, the first Senior Enlisted Advisor to the Chairman of the Joint Chiefs of Staff (SEAC). During his 33 years of service to our nation, he served in multiple enlisted leadership positions, from gunner to command sergeant major. His leadership, technical and tactical expertise epitomizes the professionalism of the U.S. cavalry formations around the world.

This competition is for scout squads from the U.S. Army and international partners. The Gainey Cup challenges these scout squads in tasks such as:

** conducting reconnaissance and security operations in close proximity to enemy forces,

** information relay to the commander's priority intelligence requirements,

** employment of indirect fires on known enemy positions,

** fighting for information through use of direct fire just to name a few.

=== Excellence in Armor ===
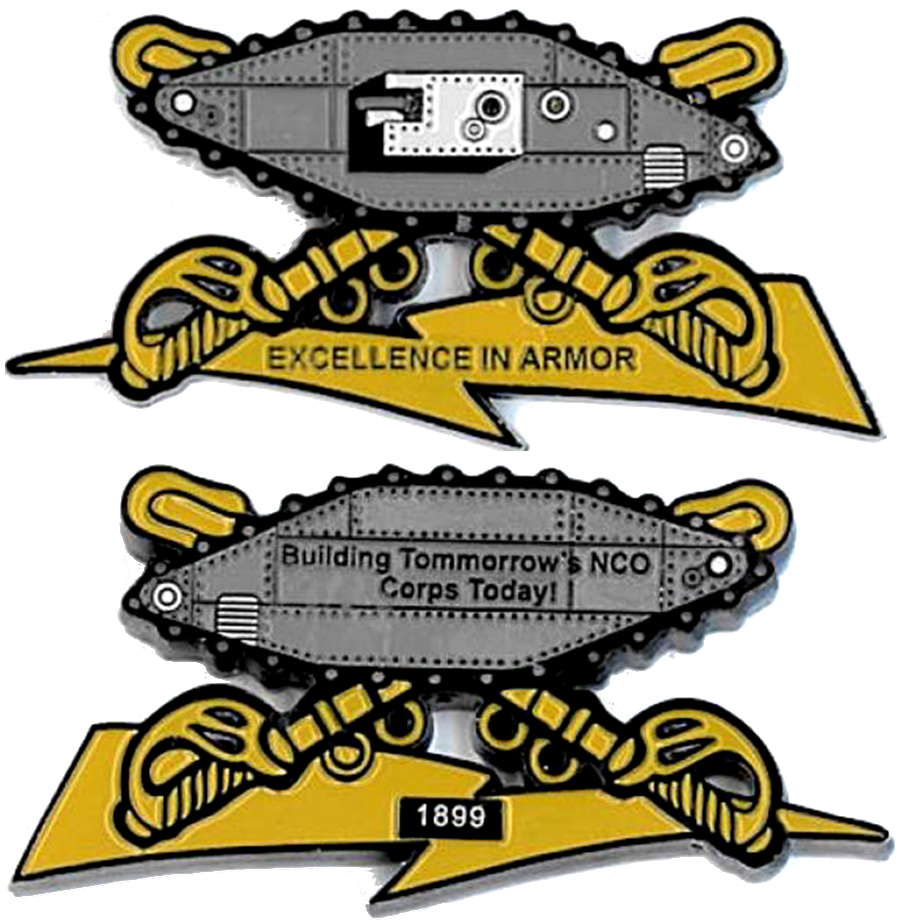
Excellence in Armor Coin

The purpose of the Excellence in Armor (EIA) Program is to identify outstanding armor and cavalry soldiers in the ranks of Private through Sergeant and 2nd Lieutenant through Captain who have demonstrated performance and leadership potential, either in OSUT or ABOLC.

The goal of the EIA Program is to:

- Increase combat readiness across Armor and Cavalry units through identification and promotion of highly qualified highly motivated armor and cavalry soldiers.
- Identify highly qualified, highly motivated armor and cavalry soldiers, whose superior potential warrants accelerated training in order to fully and more rapidly realize their-potential for advanced leadership roles.
- Encourage and facilitate armor and cavalry soldiers career progression and leadership growth.
- Provide incentives that will lead to early promotion and retention of highly qualified soldiers.
- Support commanders decision-making process for accelerated position appointments and promotion.

Soldiers receive a Department of the Army Certificate of Achievement, an EIA coin, and a Memorandum for Record from the Chief of Armor.

== See also ==
- Fort Benning Maneuver Center of Excellence
