= 316th Cavalry Brigade =

Unit of the US Army, part of US Army Armor School

- 316th Cavalry Brigade shoulder sleeve insignia
- Active: September, 1942 – present
- Country: United States
- Branch: United States Army
- Role: Training
- Size: 1,100
- Part of: U.S. Army Armor School
- Garrison/HQ: Fort Benning, Georgia
- Motto: "Perditor-Oris" (Latin: Destroyer)
- Colors: Scarlet and White
- Engagements: World War II; Cold War
- Decorations: Army Superior Unit Award 2010-2011

Commanders
- Current commander: Colonel Daniel B. Cannon
- Command Sergeant Major: CSM Glen E. Bennett

Insignia
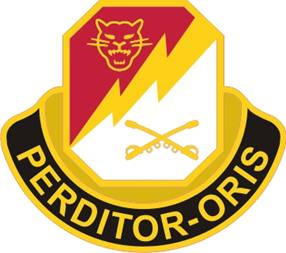
- Distinctive unit insignia

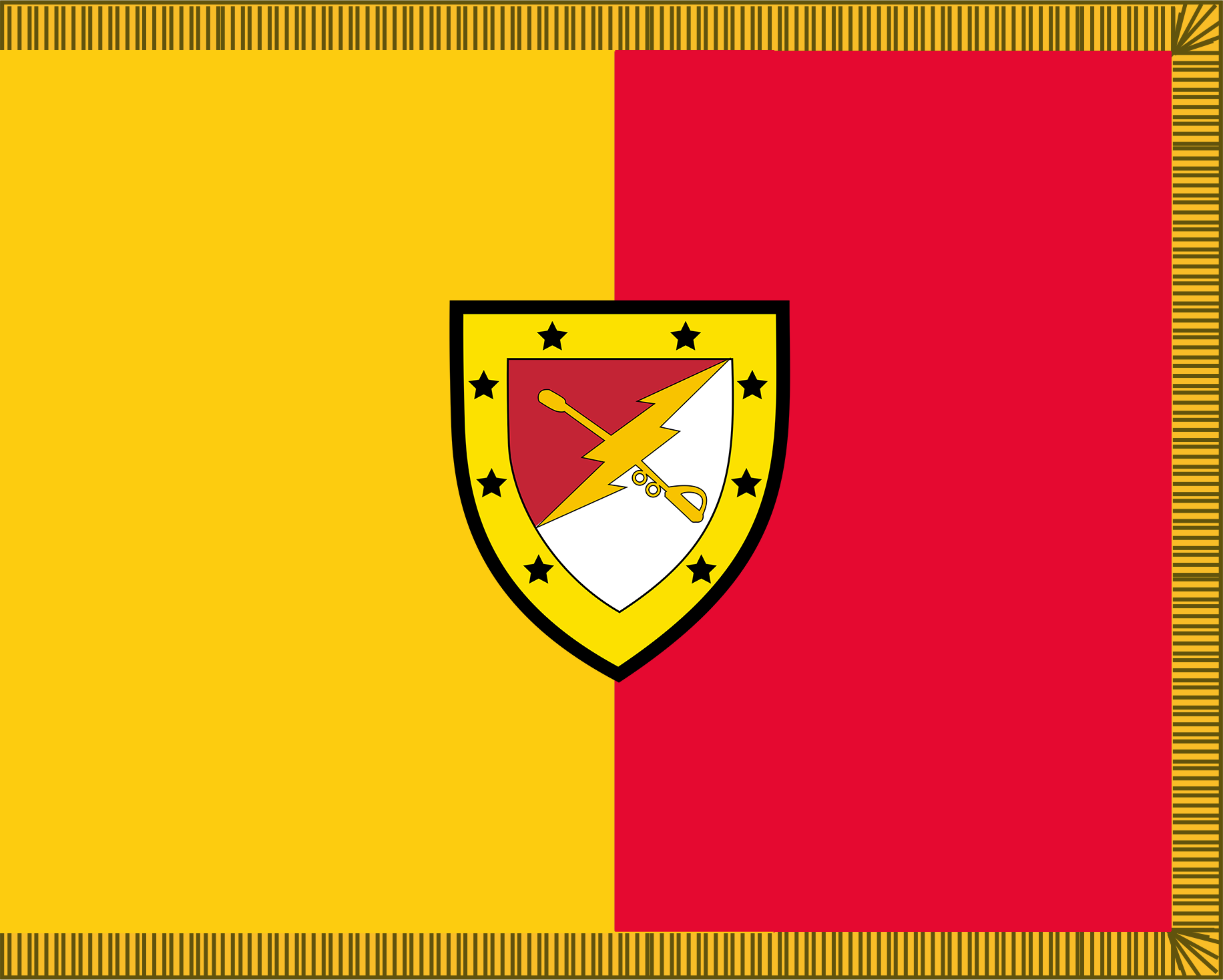
- 316th Cavalry Brigade Flag

The 316th Cavalry Brigade of the United States Army is the brigade responsible for the training of U.S. Army Cavalry and Armor officers and non-commissioned officers. The 16th Cavalry Regiment was redesignated as this unit in July 2010. The 316th Cavalry Brigade is currently assigned to Fort Benning, Georgia, in accordance with the Base Realignment and Closure of 2005.

== History ==
The 316th Cavalry Brigade was established on September 5, 1942, as a subordinate unit of the 8th Tank Destroyer Group and activated at Camp Hood (now Fort Cavazos, Texas) on October 13, 1942. The 8th Tank Destroyer Group arrived in England in September 1944 and landed in France in October 1944, supporting key operations in Northern France, the Battle of the Bulge, and Germany, including securing the Remagen Bridgehead in March 1945. The group coordinated tank destroyer units, secured rear areas, and engaged in combat operations.

After Germany's surrender, the 8th Tank Destroyer Group returned to the U.S. in July 1945 and was inactivated at Camp Bowie, Texas, in October 1945. With the disbanding of the Tank Destroyer Force, the group was redesignated as the 316th Cavalry Group on August 27, 1947. It was briefly activated in Omaha, Nebraska, before inactivating in December 1948.

In response to the Cold War, the 316th Cavalry Group was re-designated as the 316th Armored Cavalry Group and activated in Roswell, New Mexico, in 1952. It was redesignated as the 316th Armor Group in 1953 and inactivated in 1959.

On July 24, 2007, the unit was redesignated as the Headquarters and Headquarters Company, 316th Cavalry Brigade, and assigned to the U.S. Army Training and Doctrine Command (TRADOC). The brigade was activated on August 27, 2007, at Fort Knox, Kentucky, The year 2013 marked the second anniversary of the completion of the 2005 Base Realignment and Closure (BRAC) Act. This legislation resulted in the realignment of the Armor School from Fort Knox, Kentucky, to Fort Benning, Georgia. There, it assumed responsibility for training U.S. Army soldiers in the Armor branch, with some of its subordinate squadrons using historical designations as elements of the 16th Cavalry Regiment. The 316th Cavalry Brigade has evolved from a tank destroyer unit to a vital part of Army Armor and Cavalry training.

== Order of battle ==
=== Headquarters and Headquarters Troop ===
The Headquarters and Headquarters Troop is responsible for the day-to-day management of the Brigade, including personnel, intelligence, operations, logistics, and information technology.

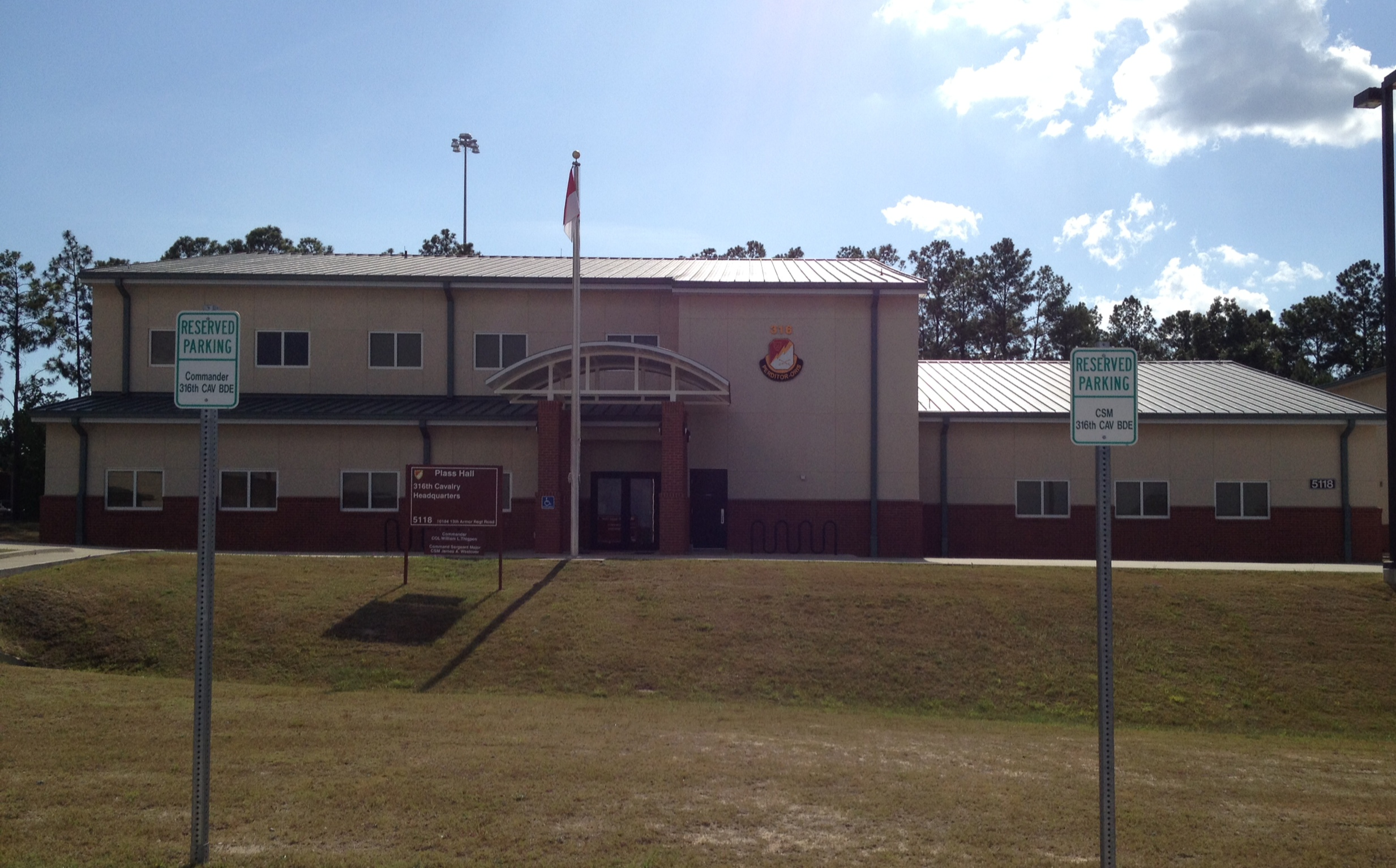
316th Cavalry Brigade HQ

=== 1st Squadron, 16th Cavalry Regiment ===
The First Squadron, Sixteenth Cavalry Regiment (1-16 CAV) provides support in the form of both soldiers and equipment for the 316th Cavalry Brigade and other units throughout MCoE such as; AMG, TCC, MLMC, and ABOLC. Additionally, the squadron is tasked with providing funeral details for soldiers across the south-eastern region of the United States.

The over-six hundred soldier squadron is commanded by Lieutenant Colonel Carl Danko, and CSM Kevin Stewart serves as the Squadron Command Sergeant Major. It is composed of four troops: Alpha "Anvil" Troop, Bravo "Bone Crusher" Troop, Charlie "Cobra" Troop, and Delta "Demon" Troop.

=== 1st Battalion, 29th Infantry Regiment ===
The First Battalion, 29th Infantry Regiment (1-29 Infantry, Pioneers) is responsible for training support to the Infantry School and Army Functional Courses such as: Stryker Leader Course, Master Gunner, and Sniper School. The Battalions command team is LTC Pete Escamilla and CSM Franklyn Rosario.

=== 3rd Squadron, 16th Cavalry Regiment ===
The 3rd Squadron, 16th Cavalry Regiment (3-16 CAV) forges Army Leaders to build readiness. It is responsible for functional leader training and education. The Squadron (SQDN) is organized with the Army's Department of Reconnaissance and Security, the Department of Combat Power, and the Department of Lethality within the Army University's Armor School at the Maneuver Center of Excellence, Fort Moore, Georgia. The Squadron is commanded by Lieutenant Colonel Hayden Scardina, and CSM Tommy Snyder serves as the Squadron's Command Sergeant Major.

The squadron hosts the following courses:

• Cavalry Leaders Course (CLC)

• Maneuver Leaders Maintenance Course (MLMC)

• Abrams Master Gunner (AMG)

• Bradley Master Gunner (BMG)

• Stryker Master Gunner (SMG)

• Tank Commanders Course (TCC)

• Abrams, Stryker, and Field Maintenance New Equipment Training Team (NETT)

=== Department of Reconnaissance and Security (Phantom Troop) ===
The Department of Reconnaissance and Security is the US Army's premier institution for training Reconnaissance and Security (R&S) knowledge, skills and abilities to leaders assigned to Cavalry formations or US Army and US Military formations conducting reconnaissance-focused operations. The Department of R&S provides training to leaders from the Squad to Brigade Staff level, and supports R&S training and education throughout the US Army. The cornerstone R&S courses offered at Fort Moore includes the Scout Leaders Course (SLC) and the Cavalry Leaders Course (CLC). The Department of R&S also integrates functionally related R&S training through with the Small Unmanned Aircraft Systems-Master Trainer (SUAS-MT)and the Reconnaissance and Surveillance Leader Course (RSLC).

=== Department of Lethality (Maverick Troop) ===
The Department of Lethality educates non-commissioned officers and officers to become the technical and tactical experts on the training and employment of combat platforms - world renown as the experts in their craft. The Department hosts the following courses: Abrams Master Gunner (AMG), Maneuver Leaders Maintenance Course (MLMC), Tank Commanders Course (TCC), and the New Equipment Training Teams (NETT).

=== Department of Combat Power (Navajo Troop) ===
The Department of Combat Power educates operators and leaders about the Bradley platform as well as Field Maintenance through the Bradley Master Gunner Course (BMG), Bradley Commanders Course (BCC), Bradly FM New Equipment Training Team ( FM NETT), and the Bradley OP New Equipment training Team (OP NETT).

=== Recent history ===
In 2010 the SQDN moved from Fort Knox to Fort Benning and transferred responsibility for the Armor Captains Career Course to 3-81AR creating the Maneuver Career Course. The unit assumed responsibility for all International students training on Fort Benning and all Reconnaissance training. As part of the Maneuver Center of Excellence Reorganization in 2014, the squadron was reorganized into three Troop and one Airborne Company. Assault Company (IN IET Support) was transferred from 2-29 IN which cased its colors in April 2014. Navajo Troop remained with the squadron and in addition to ARC and CLC assumed control of the SUAS-MT and DCT-MT Courses. Able Company (AR/CAV/BCT IET Support) was attached from 3-81 AR. Delta Company was attached from the Ranger Training Brigade and in addition to RSLC assumed responsibility for ASA A&B. On 1 October 2014, these units were permanently task organized to the 3rd Squadron and renamed A Troop, B Troop, C Troop, and D Company respectively. On May 18, 2017, A and C Troops were inactivated and the IET support committees were transferred to the 198th and 194th Brigades. On October 5, 2017, B Troop and D Co. were inactivated. H Troop was re-activated with Vietnam era lineage to support the SQDN. The Reconnaissance and Security (R&S) Courses were re-aligned under a new Department of R&S while the Department of Security Force Assistance was activated to train Combat advisors for the Security Force Assistance Brigades. On May 4, 2018, the Department of Subterranean Operations was activated. In January 2019, the Squadron assumed the Maneuver Leaders Maintenance Course (MLMC) under Hawk Troop. On March 12, 2019, the Squadron re-activated M, N, and P Troops as part of a large MCOE re-organization to re-align the Armor and Infantry Schools. RSLC was returned to ARTB as D Co., the SUASMT course, and the SBT program were transferred to 1-29IN in the 199th BDE. The Master Gunner School returned to 3rd SQDN along with the New Equipment Training Team. Today the Squadron continues to forge functional skills in excellent leaders to enhance Army readiness in reconnaissance, security, and lethality.

== Military Advisor Training Academy ==
The Combat Advisor Training Course (CATC) is focused on training U.S. Army Foreign Security Forces (FSF) Combat Advisors to serve as members of the Security Force Assistance Brigade. Graduates from the CATC will have the requisite knowledge, skills and attributes to competently train, advise, assist, accompany, and enable FSF. Students will be confident in the knowledge and skills needed to function in complex environments by, through, and with FSF as a member of an advisor team. The Academy is directed by LTC Gregory Bascomb and the course manager is 1SGT Joshua Florio.

== Heraldry ==
The shield in the shoulder insignia represents "defense and protection of the United States. The color black and the eight stars around the crest represent the original parent unit of the brigade, the 8th Tank Destroyer Group. The colors within the crest, scarlet and white, are the traditional colors of the United States Cavalry, and the color gold represents excellence. The lightning bolt in the center represents "denotes speed, mobility, and effectiveness, the characteristics of the combined forces with which the Brigade cooperates." The saber in the center is part of the United States Cavalry collar insignia.

On the distinctive unit insignia the panther is a symbol of the 8th Tank Destroyer Group.

== See also ==
- United States Army Training and Doctrine Command
- Armor Basic Officer Leadership Course
