= Fajr (disambiguation) =

Fajr, an Arabic word meaning "dawn", refers to the Muslim dawn prayer.

Fajr may also refer to:

== Religion ==
- Fajr nafl prayer, a surerogatory prayer before Fajr prayer

== Geography ==
- Fajr, Golestan, a village in Golestan province, Iran
- Fajr, Ramian, a village in Golestan province, Iran
- Fajr, Ilam, a village in Ilam province, Iran
- Fajr Rural District (Yazd County), Yazd province, Iran
- Shahrak-e Fajr (disambiguation), places in Iran

== Other uses ==
- Fajr International Film Festival, which is held annually in Iran
- F.C. Fajr Sepasi, an Iranian soccer team
- Fajr (satellite) Iranian satellite launched in 2015

== See also ==
- Al-Fajr (disambiguation)
- Fajr-5, an Iranian-made artillery rocket
- Fajr-3 (disambiguation)
- Fajr-27, a domestically manufactured Iranian rapid fire cannon system
- Operation Fajr-1, 2, 3, 4, 5, 6 and 8 (Operation Dawn 1,2,3,4,5,6 and 8), Iranian Operations in the Iran–Iraq War
- Dawn (disambiguation)
