= Shahrak-e Fajr =

Shahrak-e Fajr (Persian: شهرك فجر) may refer to:

- Shahrak-e Fajr, Fars
- Shahrak-e Fajr, Ilam
- Shahrak-e Fajr, Khuzestan
