= Al-Fajr =

Al-Fajr (الفجر) may refer to:

- Al-Fajr (sura), the 89th sura of the Qur'an
- Fajr, the first of the five salat prayers

== Media ==
- Al Fajr, a UAE newspaper based in Abu Dhabi
- El Fagr (Egyptian Arabic pronunciation of Al-Fajr), an Egyptian newspaper
- Al-Fajr English Weekly, a Palestinian English-language weekly formerly published in Jerusalem
- Al Fajr (Jerusalem), an Arabic newspaper published in Jerusalem from 1972 to 1993
- Al-Fajr (Tunisian newspaper), the now-defunct newspaper of the formerly banned Tunisian Islamist opposition movement Al-Nahda, now Ennahda
- Al-Fajr TV (est. 2004), an Islamic TV channel
- Al-Fajr (literary magazine), an Egyptian literary magazine associated with al-Madrasa al-Haditha
- Al-Fajr (1934-1935 magazine), an Egyptian magazine published by Hassan Dhu-l-Fiqar
- Al-Fajr Media, an Al-Qaeda media propaganda network

== Other uses ==
- Operation Phantom Fury, The Second Battle of Falluja, code-named Operation Al-Fajr and Operation Phantom Fury
- Al-Fajr Movement, a Syrian Islamic militant group, reported to have cooperated with Al-Nusra Front in 2012
