= 2nd Tank Battalion =

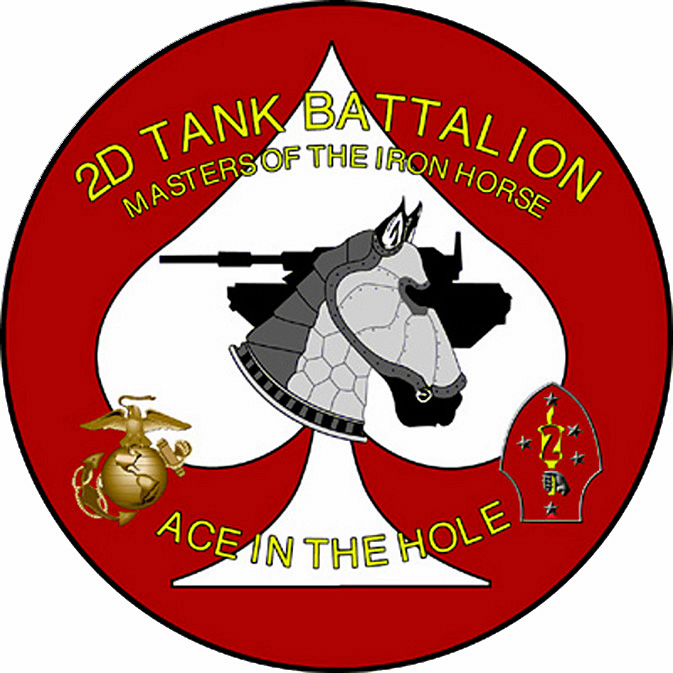
- 2nd Tanks Insignia
- Active: December 20, 1941–May 5, 2021
- Country: United States
- Branch: United States Marine Corps
- Type: Armored battalion
- Role: Armor protected firepower and shock action.
- Size: Battalion
- Part of: 2nd Marine Division; 2nd Marine Expeditionary Force
- Garrison/HQ: Marine Corps Base Camp Lejeune
- Nickname: Iron Horse
- Motto: "Ace in the Hole"
- Engagements: World War II: Battle of Tarawa; Battle of Saipan; Battle of Tinian; Battle of Okinawa; Operation Urgent Fury; Operation Desert Storm; War on terror: Operation Iraqi Freedom; War in Afghanistan

Commanders
- Battalion Commander: Lt Col Matthew Dowden
- Battalion Sergeant Major: Sgt Maj Joshua J. Smith

The 2nd Tank Battalion (2nd Tanks) was an armored battalion of the United States Marine Corps which was based out of the Marine Corps Base Camp Lejeune, North Carolina. It fell under the command of the 2nd Marine Division and the II Marine Expeditionary Force. Beginning in 2020 the United States Marine Corps deactivated all its tank battalions in order to conform to its 2030 modernization plan. The 2nd Tank Battalion was deactivated on May 5, 2021, after 79 years of service.

== History ==
=== World War II ===
The battalion formed on December 20, 1941, at Camp Elliott, San Diego, California, growing to the standard organization with a headquarters, service and four letter companies (Able, Baker, Charlie, Dog). Baker Company deployed to Samoa in January and Charlie Company sailed with the 2nd Marine Regiment to the Solomon Islands. On August 8, 1942, two M3 tanks participated in seizing Tanambogo Island against heavy resistance. 2nd Tanks participated in every action of the 2nd Marine Division to include the Battle of Tarawa, Battle of Saipan and Battle of Okinawa. After a brief tour with the Japan occupation force, the battalion returned to its permanent garrison at MCB Camp Lejeune.

=== Korean War ===
With the coming of the Korean War, most of the battalion's personnel immediately augmented the 1st Tank Battalion. It also provided the cadre for the 8th Tank Battalion, a wartime expansion force battalion. Garrison duty on the East Coast of the US involved support to routine deployments in the Mediterranean and Caribbean. 2nd Tank Battalion units became involved in two interventions in Lebanon, the Cuban Missile Crisis deployment, the Dominican Republic and the Guantanamo Base defense effort.

=== Vietnam & Post-war years ===
The Vietnam War again caused the battalion to provide replacements for the tank battalions deployed there. After the Vietnam War, peacetime deployments swelled with participation in NATO exercises. Units of the battalion also saw brief combat in the invasion of Grenada.

=== Gulf War ===
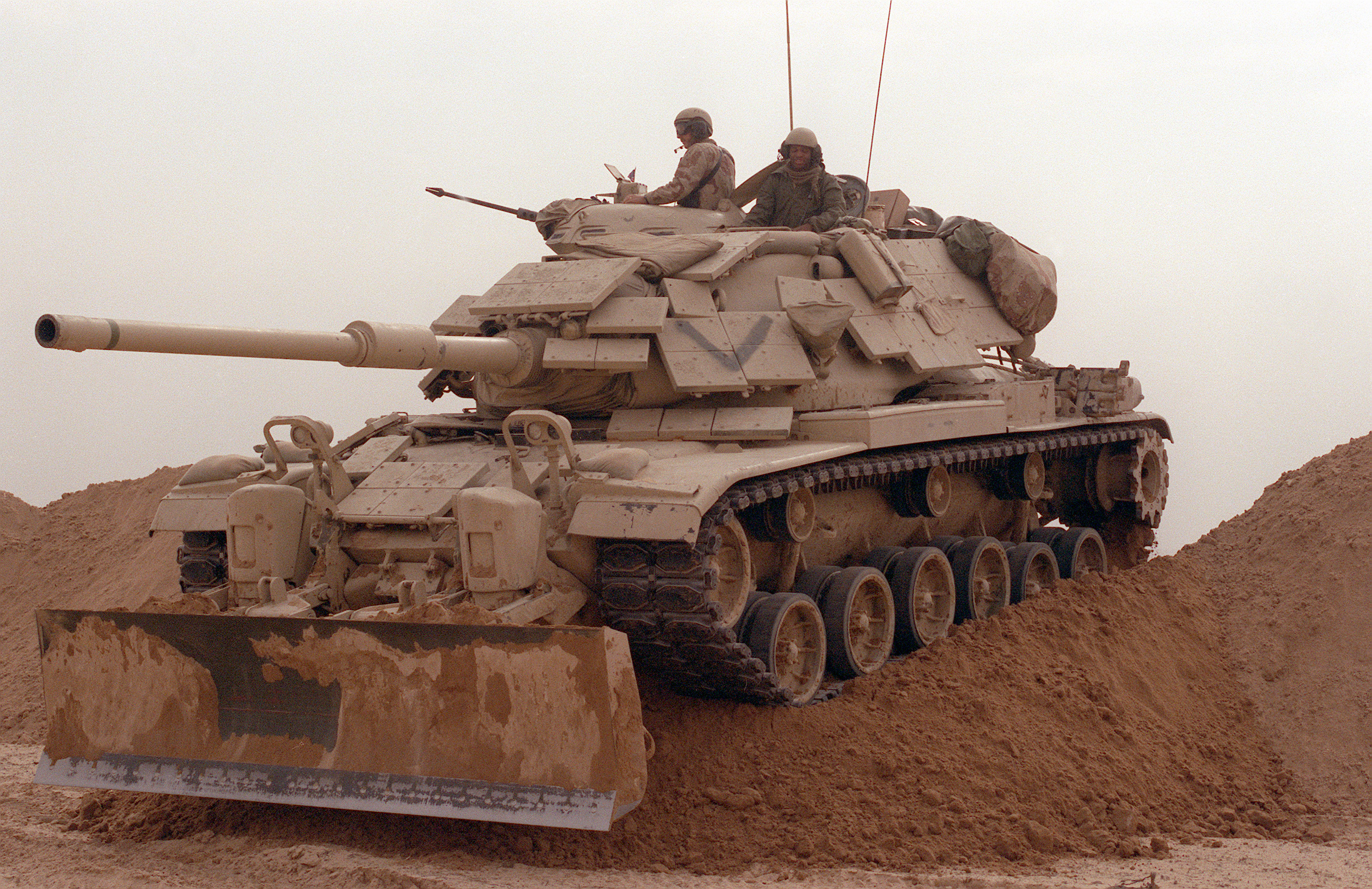
Marines from Company D, 2nd Tank Battalion, drive their M60A1 main battle tank during a breach exercise in Operation Desert Storm in 1991. The tank is fitted with reactive armor and an M-9 bulldozer kit.

The battalion as a whole saw its first combat since the Second World War in 1991, as it moved with the 2nd Marine Division to Saudi Arabia for the liberation of Kuwait. Augmented by companies of the 4th Tank Battalion, 2nd Tanks served as the division reserve for the four-day war in Kuwait.

=== Iraq War ===
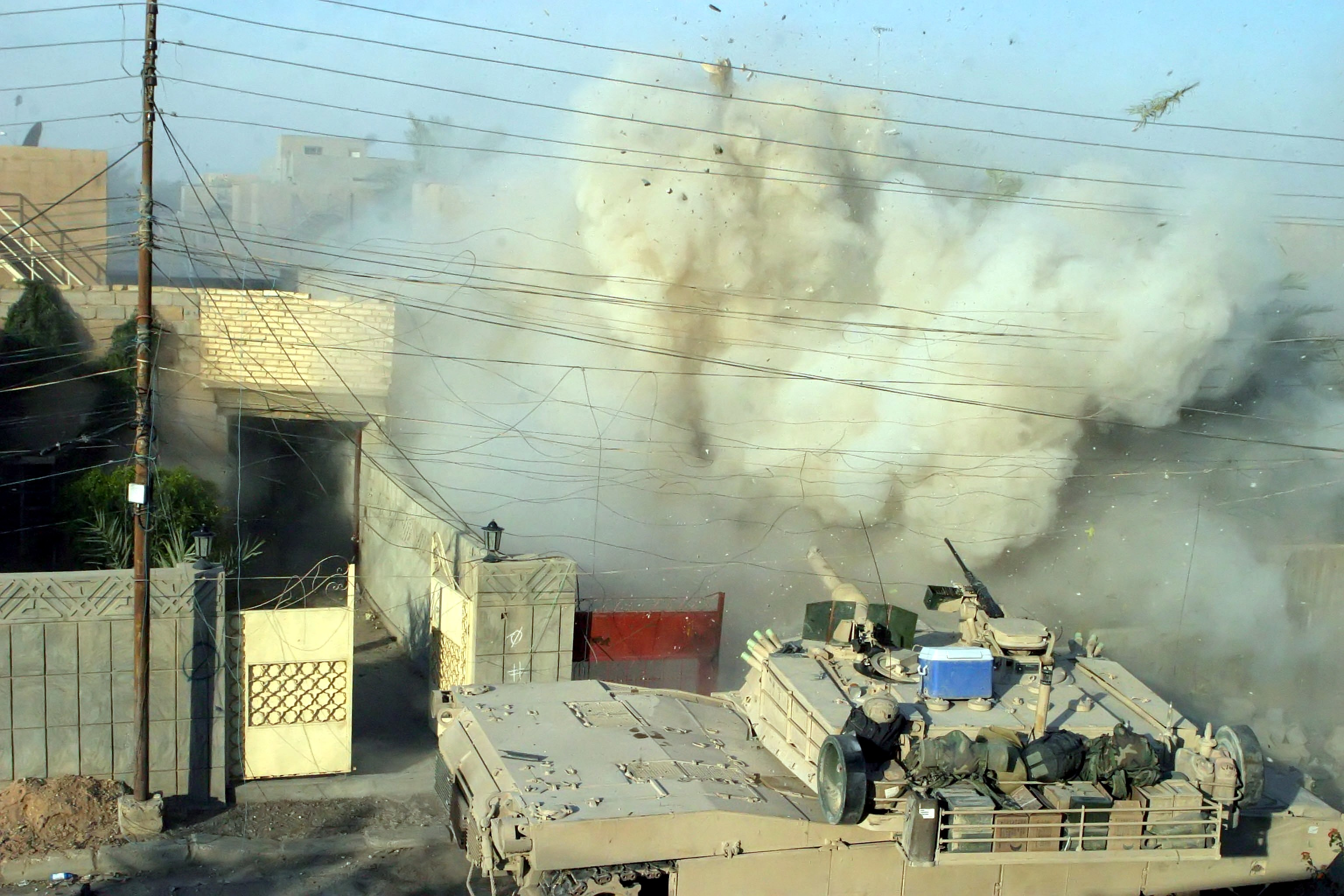
A Marine M1A1 Abrams, 2nd Tank Battalion, fires its main gun into a building to provide suppressive counter fire against insurgents in Fallujah, Al Anbar Province, Iraq during Operation Al Fajr, 2004.

The opening of 2003 found 2nd Tank Battalion preparing for deployment to Kuwait in support of Operation Iraqi Freedom. Led by Lt Col Michael J. Oehl they deployed under the operational control of the 1st Marine Division and were attached to Regimental Combat Team 5 (RCT-5) upon arrival in theater. On March 20, 2nd Tank Battalion led RCT-5 and 1st Marine Division across the southern Iraqi border, initiating an attack that would ultimately result in the seizure of the Iraqi capital of Baghdad and the destruction of the Saddam Hussein regime. 2nd Tank Battalion fought numerous engagements in support of Operation Iraqi Freedom, to include battles in An Numaniyah, Al Aziziyah, and eastern Baghdad. Following the seizure of Baghdad, Company D and the AT-TOW Platoon supported Task Force Tripoli and their movement into Tikrit. Upon the cessation of combat operations, 2nd Tank Battalion participated in humanitarian operations in Baghdad. The battalion redeployed to MCB Camp Lejeune on May 29, 2003.

In November 2004 while deployed for Operation Iraqi Freedom 2-2, Company C attached to Regimental Combat Team 1 (RCT-1), 1st Marine Division and Company A attached to Regimental Combat Team 7 (RCT-7), 1st Marine Division participated by assisting in portions of Operation Phantom Fury, the recapture of Fallujah.

== Afghanistan War ==
In December 2009, 2nd Tank Battalion deployed to Helmand Province for their inaugural deployment to Afghanistan as part of the surge. They remained in Afghanistan until 2013 as a result of the U.S. forces drawdown.

== Unit awards ==
A unit citation or commendation is an award bestowed upon an organization for the action cited. Members of the unit who participated in said actions are allowed to wear on their uniforms the awarded unit citation. 2nd Tanks has been presented with the following awards:

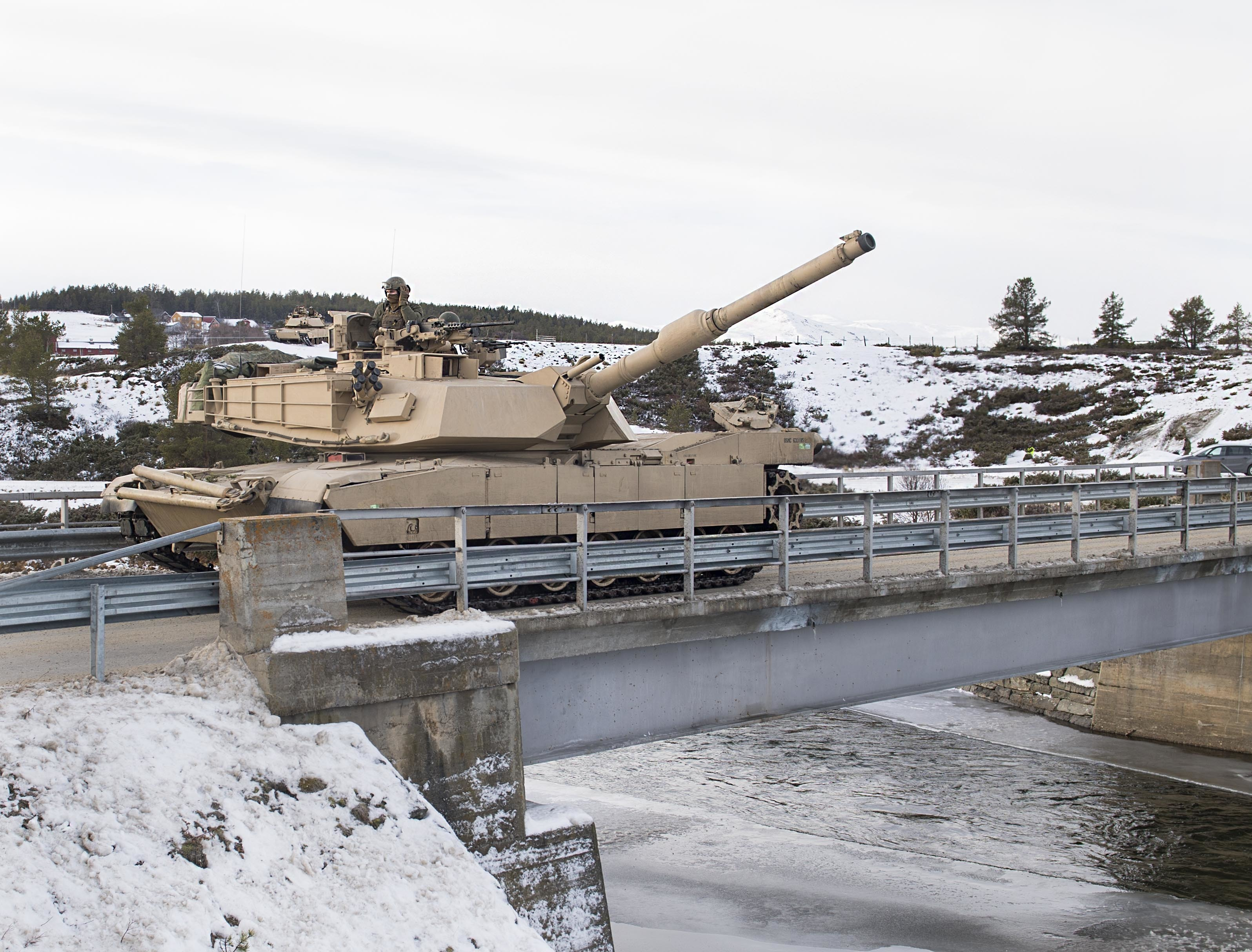
U.S. Marines with 2nd Tank Battalion, 2nd Marine Division, advance on their eastern objective defended by opposing Spanish forces during Exercise Trident Juncture 18 near Folldal, Norway on Nov. 3, 2018. Trident Juncture 18 enhances the U.S. and NATO Allies’ and partners’ abilities to work together collectively to conduct military operations under challenging conditions.

Ribbon	Unit Award
	Presidential Unit Citation with three Bronze Stars
	Navy Unit Commendation
	China Service Medal
	American Defense Service Medal with one Bronze Star
	Asiatic-Pacific Campaign Medal with one Silver Star and two Bronze Stars
	World War II Victory Medal
	Navy Occupation Service Medal with Asia and Europe clasp
	National Defense Service Medal with two Bronze Stars
	Armed Forces Expeditionary Medal
	Marine Corps Expeditionary Medal
	Southwest Asia Service Medal with three Bronze Stars
	Iraq Campaign Medal
	Global War on Terrorism Expeditionary Medal
	Global War on Terrorism Service Medal

== See also ==
- List of United States Marine Corps battalions
- Organization of the United States Marine Corps
