= Second Battle of Fallujah =

2004 battle of the Iraq War

- Part of the Iraq War
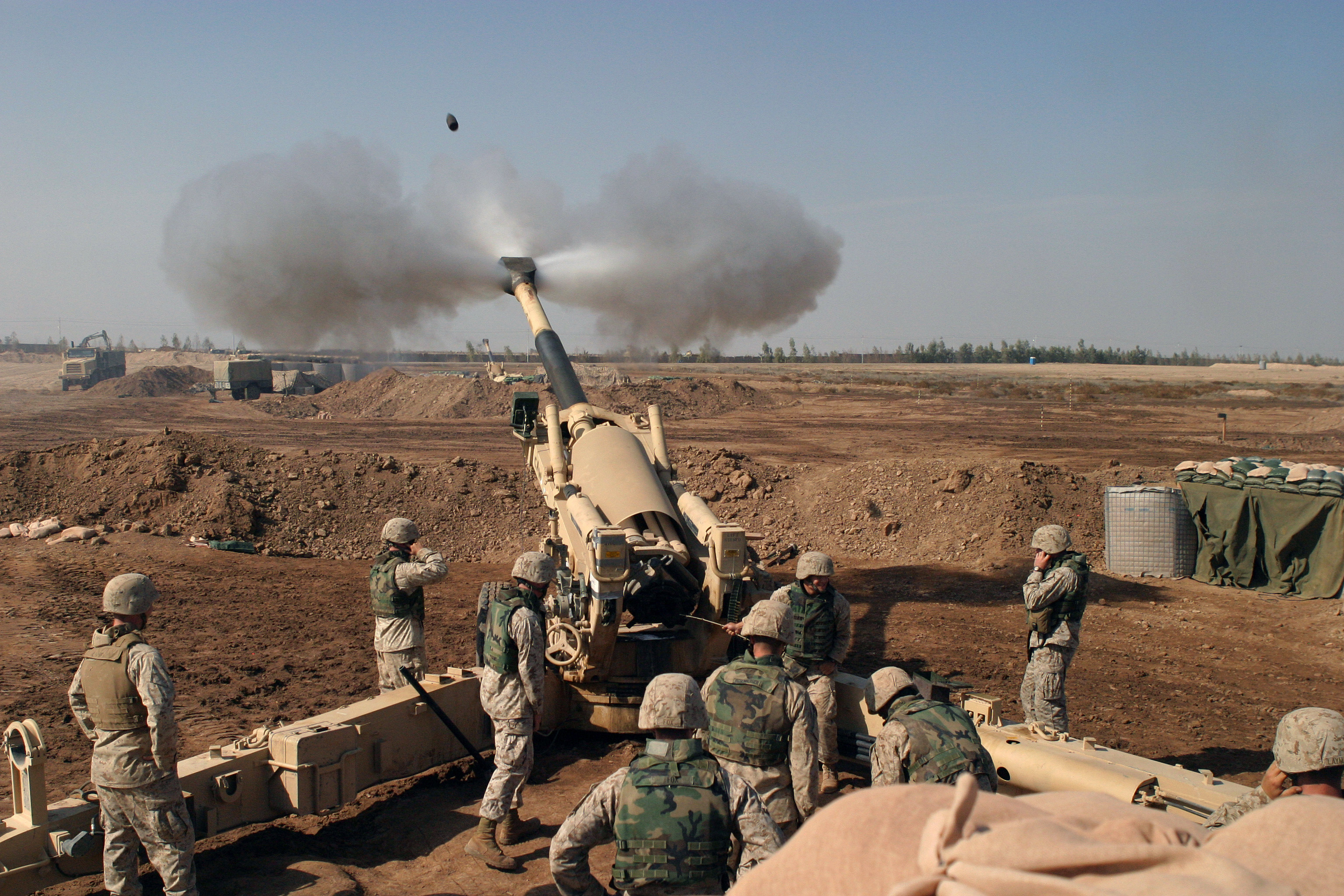
- U.S. Marines from Mike Battery, 4th Battalion, 14th Marines, firing an M198 howitzer from Camp Fallujah (November 2004)
Date	7 November – 23 December 2004 (1 month, 2 weeks and 2 days)
Location	Fallujah, Anbar Governorate, Iraq 33°21′N 43°47′E
Result	Coalition victory

Belligerents
United States; Iraq; United Kingdom	Al-Qaeda in Iraq; Islamic Army in Iraq; Ansar al-Sunnah; 1920 Revolution Brigades

Commanders and leaders
Keith J. Stalder; Richard F. Natonski; James Cowan	Abu Musab al-Zarqawi; Omar Hadid al-Dulaimi †; Abdullah Shaddad †; Abdullah al-Janabi; Abu Ayyub al-Masri

Strength
10,500; 2,000; 850	≈3,700–4,000

Casualties and losses
95 killed, 560 wounded (54 killed, 425 wounded from 7–16 November); 8 killed, 43 wounded 4 killed, 10 wounded	1,200–2,000 killed 1,500 captured (coalition estimate)
- Civilian casualties: 581–670 killed (Iraq Body Count); 800 killed (Red Cross)

The Second Battle of Fallujah, initially codenamed Operation Phantom Fury, Operation al-Fajr (Arabic: الفجر, lit. 'The Dawn') was an American led offensive of the Iraq War that began on 7 November 2004 and lasted about six weeks.

A joint military effort of the United States, the Iraqi Interim Government, and the United Kingdom, the battle was the war's first major engagement fought solely against the Iraqi insurgency, not the military forces of the Ba'athist Iraq government.

Operation Phantom Fury took place seven months after the First Battle of Fallujah, an attempt to capture or kill insurgent elements involved in the 2004 Fallujah ambush that killed four employees of the private military contractor Blackwater. After that battle, control of the city was transferred to an Iraqi-run local security force, which began stockpiling weapons and building complex defenses.

Led by the U.S. Marine Corps and U.S. Army, the Second Battle of Fallujah was later described as "some of the heaviest urban combat Marines and Soldiers have been involved in since Huế City in Vietnam in 1968" and as the toughest battle the U.S. military has been in since the end of the Vietnam War. It was the single bloodiest and fiercest battle of the entire conflict, including for American troops. It was also noted for the use of white phosphorus by U.S. forces.

== Background ==
In February 2004, control of Fallujah and the surrounding area in the Al Anbar Governorate was transferred from the United States 82nd Airborne Division to the 1st Marine Division. Shortly afterward, on 31 March 2004, four American private military contractors from Blackwater – Wesley Batalona, Scott Helvenston, Jerry Zovko, and Michael Teague – were ambushed and killed in the city. Images of their mutilated bodies were broadcast around the world. Journalist Jeremy Scahill later called this incident the Mogadishu moment of the Iraq War (referencing the Battle of Mogadishu, also known as the "Black Hawk Down" incident). Although tactical commanders in Iraq considered these deaths militarily insignificant, U.S. political leaders disapproved of a measured approach targeting the perpetrators and instead requested a larger assault into the city. A leak later revealed that the main factor behind this incident wasn't the killings themselves, but the circulation of images of the event which served as a symbol of opposition to American forces in Iraq.

Within days, U.S. Marine Corps forces launched Operation Vigilant Resolve (5 April 2004) to take back control of the city from insurgent forces. On 28 April 2004, Operation Vigilant Resolve ended with an agreement where the local population was ordered to keep the insurgents out of the city. The Fallujah Brigade, composed of local Iraqis under the command of a former Ba'athist officer named Muhammed Latif, took control of the city.

Insurgent strength and control began to grow to such an extent that by 24 September 2004, a senior U.S. official told ABC News that catching Abu Musab al-Zarqawi, said to be in Fallujah, was now "the highest priority," and estimated his troops at 5,000 men, mostly non-Iraqi jihadists. However, the stated purpose of the military operation in Fallujah was to weaken the insurgency in preparation for the planned Iraqi elections in January 2005.

== Preparations ==
=== Coalition forces ===
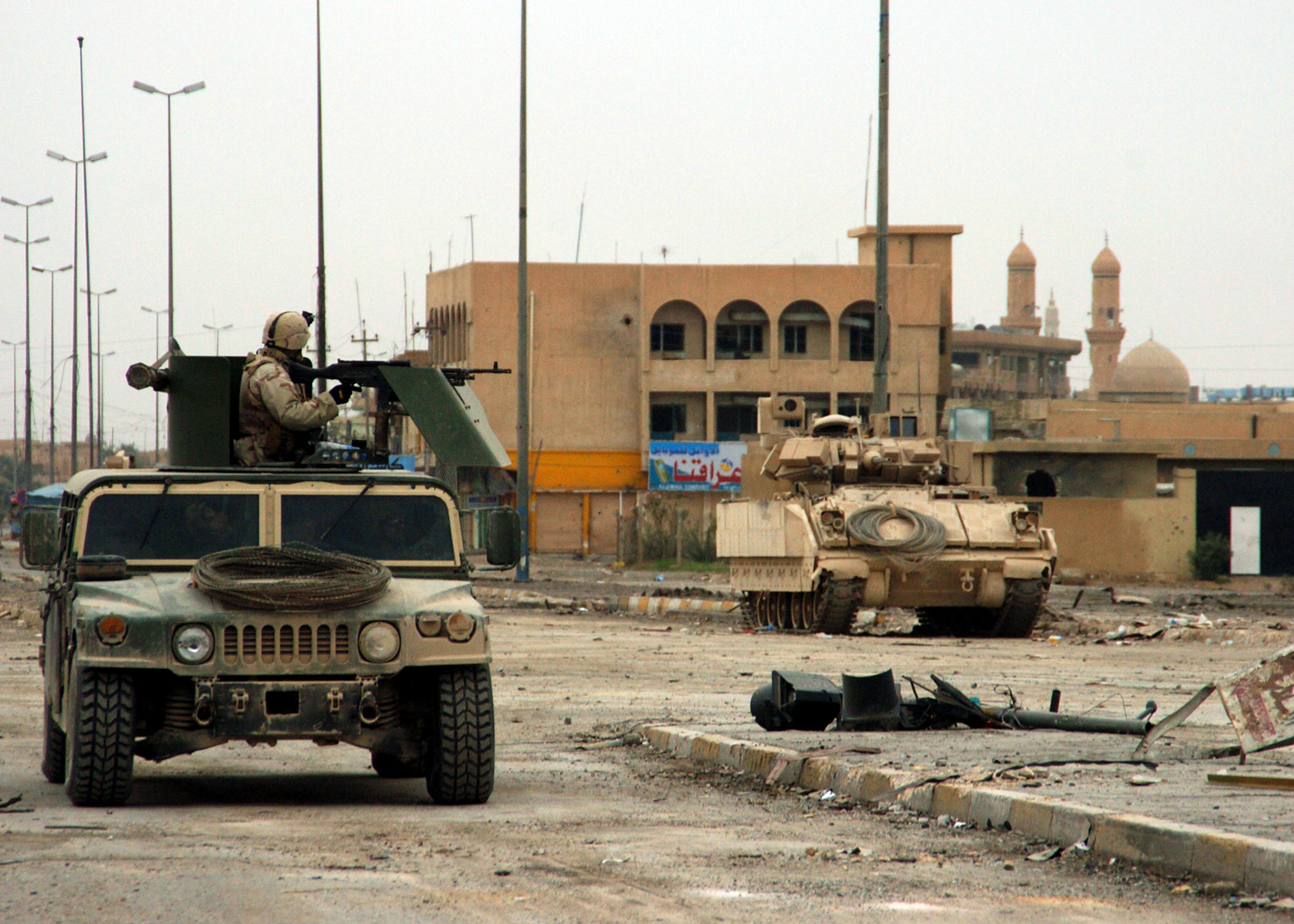
A Bradley Fighting Vehicle and HMMWV providing security while Seabees assigned to Naval Mobile Construction Battalion Four (NMCB-4) clear debris from the streets of Fallujah, Iraq.

I Marine Expeditionary Force. November 2004.

Before beginning their attack, U.S. and Iraqi forces had established checkpoints around the city to prevent anyone from entering, and to intercept insurgents attempting to flee. In addition, overhead imagery was used to prepare maps of the city for use by the attackers. American units were augmented by Iraqi interpreters to assist them in the planned fight. After weeks of withstanding air strikes and artillery bombardment, the militants in the city appeared to be vulnerable to direct attack.

U.S., Iraqi and British forces totaled about 13,500. The U.S. had gathered some 6,500 Marines and 1,500 Army Soldiers that would take part in the assault with about 2,500 Navy personnel in operational and support roles. U.S. troops were grouped in two Regimental Combat Teams: Regimental Combat Team 1 comprised 3rd Battalion/1st Marines, 3rd Battalion/5th Marines, and U.S. Army 2d Battalion/7th Cavalry. Regimental Combat Team 7 comprised the 1st Battalion/8th Marines, 1st Battalion/3rd Marines, U.S. Army 2d Battalion/2d Infantry, 2d Battalion/12th Cavalry. About 2,000 Iraqi troops assisted with the assault. All were supported by Marine fixed and rotary-winged aircraft, Navy and Air Force fixed-wing aircraft; and USSOCOM Sniper Elements.

The 850 strong 1st Battalion of the Black Watch was ordered to help U.S. and Iraqi forces with the encirclement of Fallujah. As part of Task Force Black, D Squadron of the British SAS prepared to take part in the operation, but British political nervousness about the possible scale of casualties stopped any direct UK involvement in the ground battle.

=== Insurgent forces ===
In April, Fallujah was occupied by about 500 "hardcore" and 1,000+ "part time" insurgents. By November, it was estimated that the numbers had doubled. Another estimate put the number of insurgents at 3,000; however, a number of insurgent leaders escaped before the attack.

Fallujah was occupied by virtually every insurgent group in Iraq: al-Qaeda in Iraq (AQI), Islamic Army of Iraq (IAI), Ansar al-Sunna, Army of Mohammed (AOM), the Army of the Mujahedeen and the Secret Islamic Army of Iraq. Three groups, (AQI, IAI and the National Islamic Army (1920 Revolution Brigade)) had their nationwide headquarters in Fallujah. An estimated 2,000 insurgents were from the Army of Mohammed (made up of ex Fedayeen Saddam fighters), Ansar al-Sunna and various smaller Iraqi groups.

Unlike what most cities in Iraq saw, the Battle of Fallujah did not have internal disputes between insurgents. The fighters consisted of both Sunnis and Shi'as; Soldiers of the Mahdi army fought alongside Sunni and Ba'athist groups against the United States. The Iraqi insurgents and foreign Mujahideen present in the city prepared fortified defenses in advance of the anticipated attack. They dug tunnels, trenches, prepared spider holes, and built and hid a wide variety of IEDs. In some locations, they filled the interiors of darkened homes with large numbers of propane bottles, large drums of gasoline, and ordinance, all wired to a remote trigger that could be set off by an insurgent when troops entered the building. They blocked streets with Jersey barriers and even emplaced them within homes to create strong points behind which they could attack unsuspecting troops entering the building. Insurgents were equipped with a variety of advanced small arms, and had captured a variety of U.S. armament, including M14s, M16s, body armor, uniforms and helmets.

They booby-trapped buildings and vehicles, including wiring doors and windows to grenades and other ordnance. Anticipating U.S. tactics to seize the roofs of high buildings, they bricked up stairwells to the roofs of many buildings, creating paths into prepared fields of fire which they hoped the troops would enter.

Intelligence briefings given prior to battle reported that coalition forces would encounter Chechen, Filipino, Egyptian, Saudi, Jordanian, and Syrian combatants, as well as native Iraqis.

=== Civilian presence ===
Most of Fallujah's civilian population fled the city before the battle, which greatly reduced the potential for noncombatant casualties. U.S. military officials estimated that 70–90% of the 300,000 civilians in the city fled before the attack, leaving 30,000 to 90,000 civilians still in the city. The military used leaflets and broadcasts to encourage civilians to leave the city before the assault. However, multiple news agencies reported that military-aged males were prevented from leaving or entering the city by the U.S. military. Additionally, not all civilians had the means to leave Fallujah before the battle. Jane Arraf, who was embedded with U.S. troops, said that some families wrote "We are family" on the doors of their homes, hoping the Marines would not attack during the battle.

== Battle ==
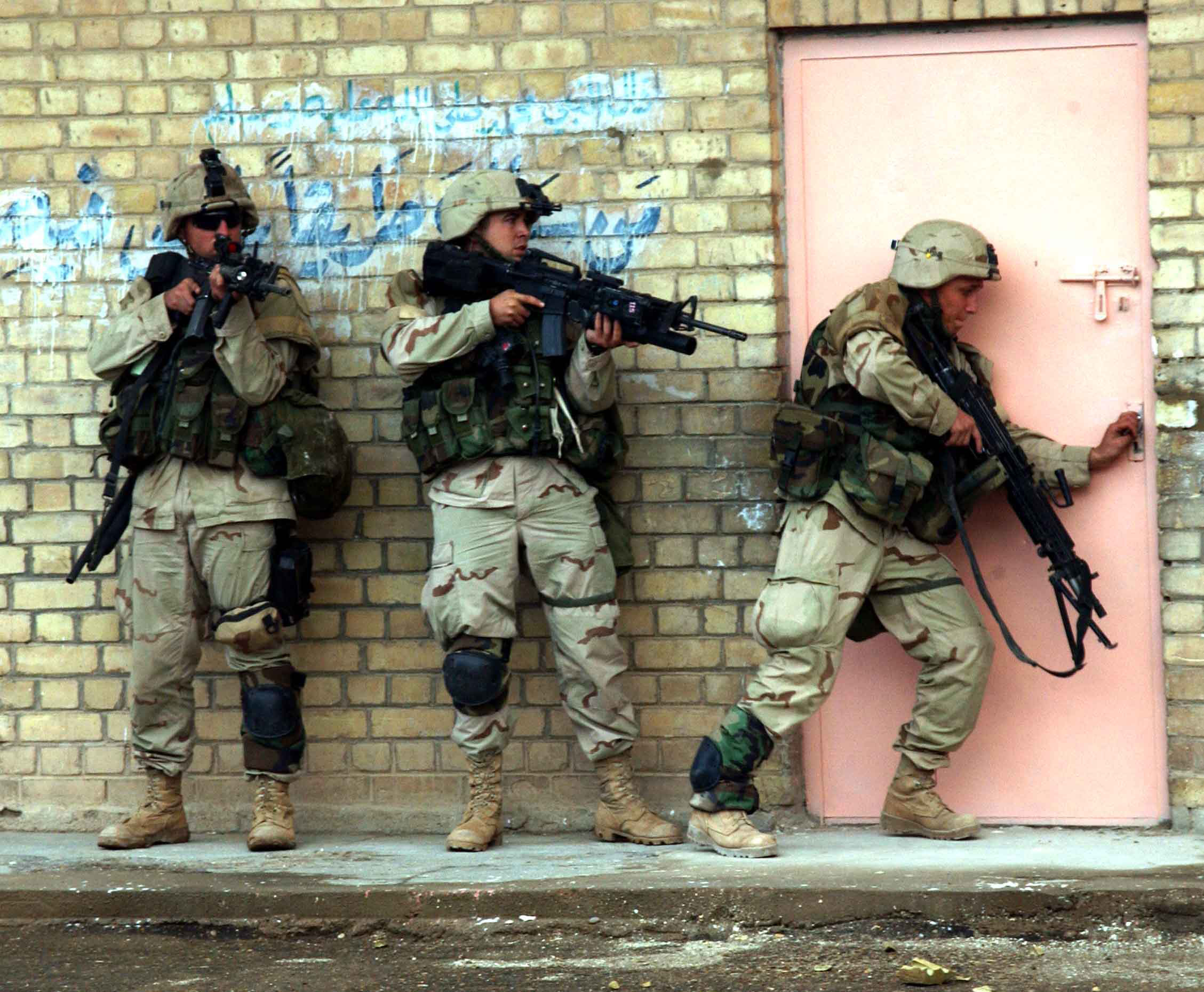
US Army Infantrymen from TF 2–7 CAV prepare to enter a building during fighting in Fallujah.

=== Diversion ===
With Navy SEAL and Force Recon Scout Snipers providing reconnaissance and target marking on the city perimeter, ground operations began on the night of 7 November 2004. Attacking from the west and south, the Iraqi 36th Commando Battalion with their U.S. Army Special Forces advisers, 1st and 2nd Platoon Charlie Company, Manchu 1st Battalion 9th Infantry Regiment Mechanized, 2nd Brigade Combat Team, 2nd Infantry Division (U.S. Army) served as the main effort on the peninsula and supported by 3rd Platoon Alpha Company 2/72nd Tank Battalion (U.S. Army), and 3rd Light Armored Reconnaissance Battalion, reinforced by Bravo Company from the Marine Corps Reserve's 1st Battalion, 23rd Regiment, and supported by Combat Service Support Company 122.

2nd Infantry Division, Manchu, Charlie Co 1-9 Infantry Mechanized with 1st and 2nd platoons, (US Army) SEAL Sniper Task Elements from Naval Special Warfare Task Group Central and the U.S. Marine Corps Scout Platoons, captured Fallujah General Hospital, Blackwater Bridge, ING building, and villages opposite of the Euphrates River along Fallujah's western edge. The Marine scout sniper team entered in Bradley’s with the US Army 1st platoon Charlie 1/9 Manchu Infantry dismounts. These scout snipers were then positioned on the roof of the remains of the ING building across from the hospital, after a 500 pound and then 1000 pound bomb were dropped on the building. The Manchus took over the building and with the scouts on the roof engaged in fire fights across the river. Marines from 1/3 fired 81mm mortars in an operation in south Fallujah. US Army Charlie 1/9 Manchu 2nd platoon then moved to the western approaches to the city and secured the Jurf Kas Sukr Bridge. These initial attacks, however, were a diversion intended to distract and confuse insurgents holding the city, preceding the all-out offensive. Two Marines died in the initial attacks when their bulldozer fell into the Euphrates River. 42 insurgents were killed along the Fallujah riverside.

=== Main attack ===
Marines from 3rd Battalion 1st Marines and 3rd Battalion 5th Marines during the Second Battle of Fallujah.

After Navy Seabees from I MEF Engineer Group (MEG) and Army Civil Affairs soldiers interrupted and disabled electrical power at two substations located just northeast and northwest of the city, two Marine Regimental Combat Teams, Regimental Combat Team 1 (RCT-1) and Regimental Combat Team 7 (RCT-7) launched an attack along the northern edge of the city. They were joined by two U.S. Army heavy battalion mechanized units, the 2nd Battalion, 7th Cavalry Regiment, and Task Force 2nd Battalion, 2nd Infantry Regiment (Mechanized), followed by four Marine infantry battalions tasked with clearing buildings. The Army's mechanized Second Brigade, First Cavalry Division, Marines' 2nd Light Armored Reconnaissance Battalion and A. Co 1st Battalion, 5th Infantry Regiment, was tasked with infiltrating the city and destroying any fleeing enemy forces. The British Army's 1st Battalion, The Black Watch, patrolled the main highways to the east. The RCTs were augmented by three 7-man SEAL Sniper Teams from Naval Special Warfare Task Group-Central and one platoon from 1st Recon, who provided advance reconnaissance in the city, Joint Terminal Aircraft Control (JTAC) and unilateral overwatch throughout the operation. The United States Air Force provided close air support for the ground offensive, employing F-15 Strike Eagles, F-16 Fighting Falcons, A-10 Thunderbolt IIs, B-52 Stratofortresses, and AC-130 gunships to carry out close-quarter precision airstrikes against enemy strongholds within the city. The Air Force also employed MQ-1 Predator unmanned aerial vehicles for reconnaissance and precision strikes, and the U-2 Dragon Lady high-altitude reconnaissance aircraft for intelligence collection, surveillance and reconnaissance before, during, and after the battle.

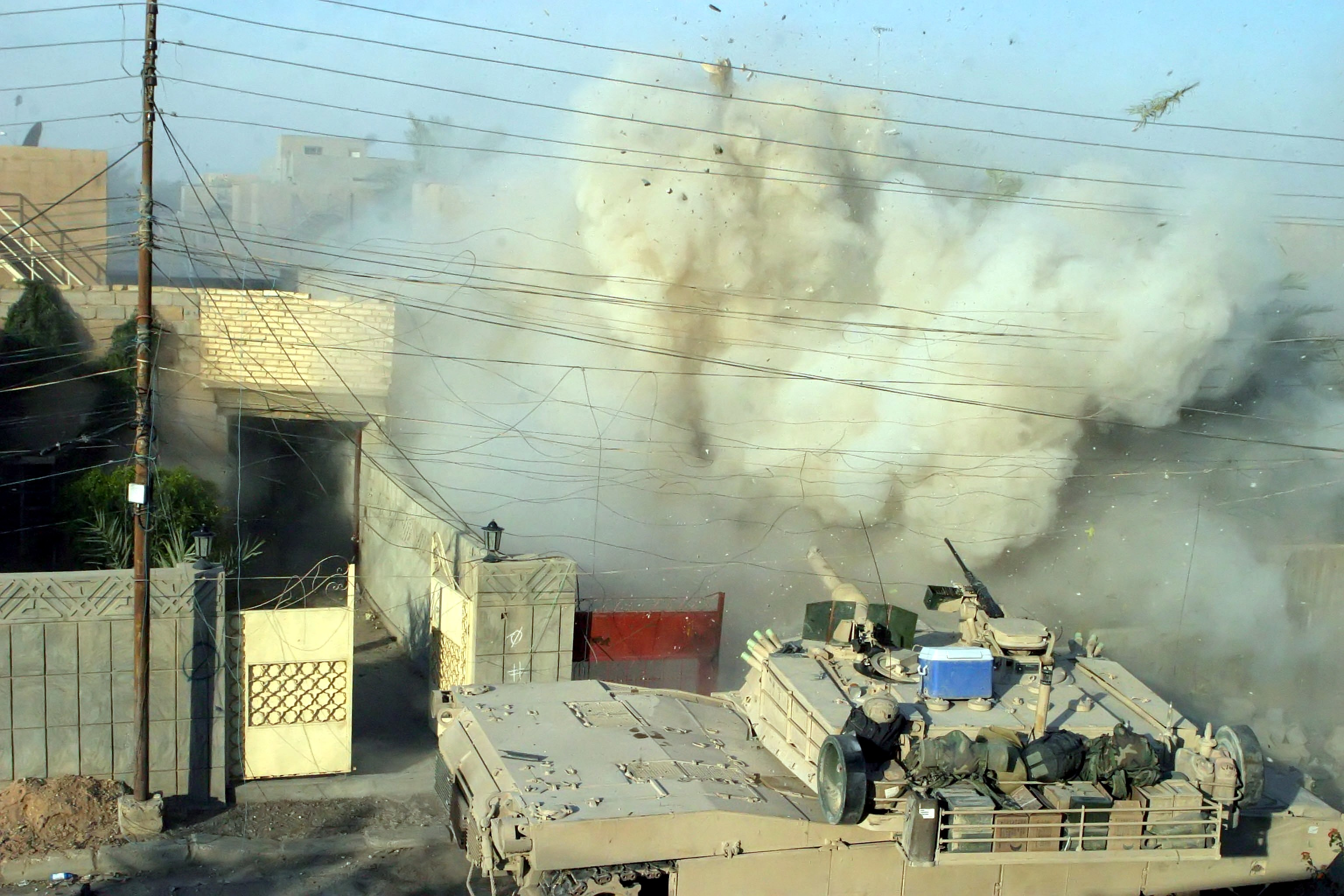
An M1A1 Abrams fires its main gun into a building to provide suppressive counterfire against insurgents.

The six battalions of U.S. and Iraqi forces, aided by Marine Corps Scout and Target Acquisition, SEAL Sniper, and JTAC elements pre-fire operations, moved into the city under the cover of darkness; and once aligned with the reconnaissance elements, began the assault in the early hours of 8 November 2004, preceded by an intense artillery barrage firing some 2500 155mm projectiles and air attack. This was followed by an attack on the main train station, which was then used as a staging point for follow-on forces. By that afternoon, under the protection of intense air cover, Marines entered the Hay Naib al-Dubat and al-Naziza districts. The Marines were followed by the Navy Seabees of NMCB 4 and NMCB 23 who bulldozed the streets clear of debris from the bombardment that morning. The Seabees used armored bulldozers to plow the streets while remaining safe and protected from enemy fire. Shortly after nightfall on 9 November 2004, Marines had reportedly reached Phase Line Fran at Highway 10 in the center of the city.

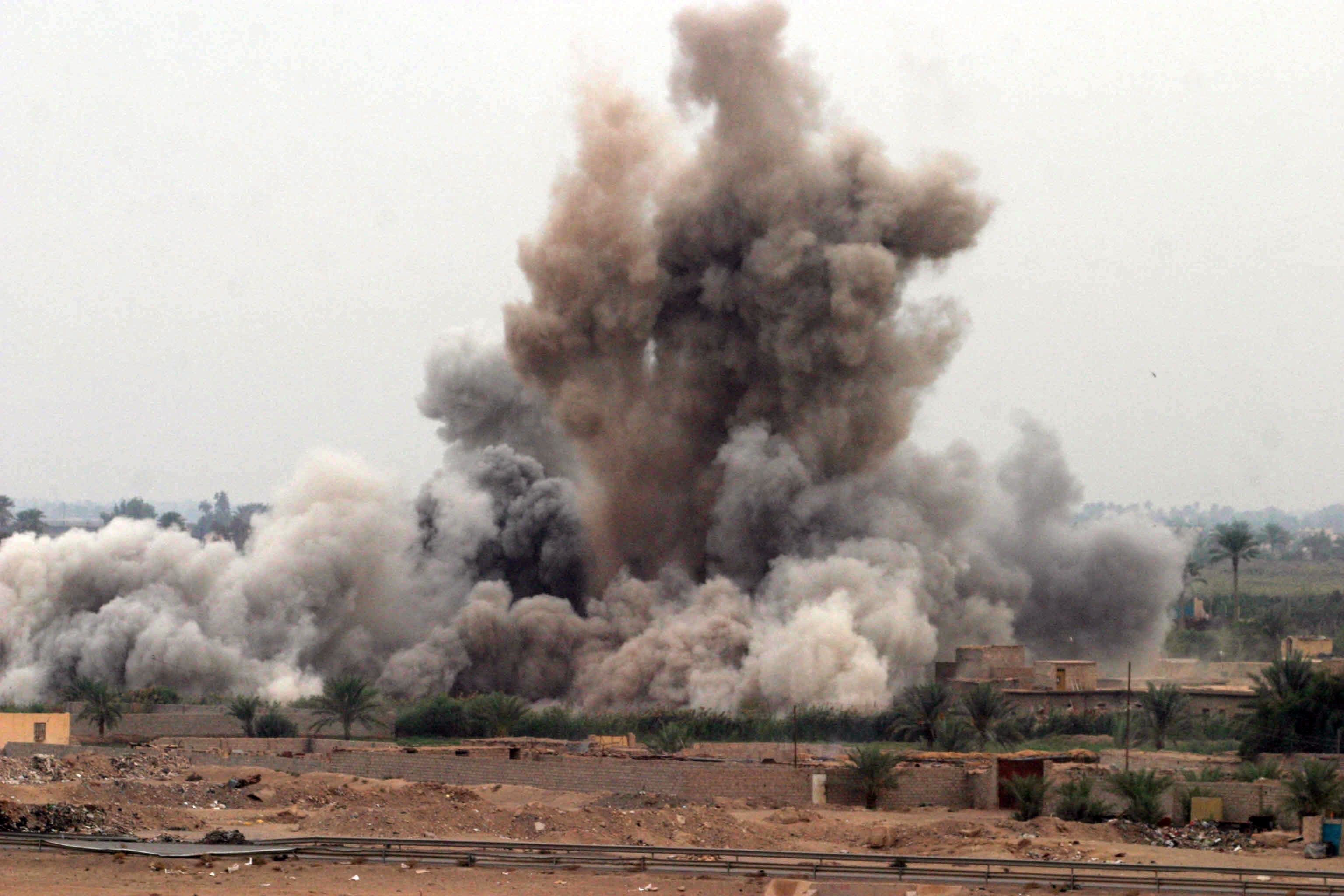
An air strike is called in on a suspected insurgent hideout in Fallujah.

While most of the fighting subsided by 13 November 2004, U.S. Marines and Special Operations Forces continued to face determined isolated resistance from insurgents hidden throughout the city. By 16 November 2004, after nine days of fighting, the Marine command described the action as mopping up pockets of resistance. Sporadic fighting continued until 23 December 2004.

By late January 2005, news reports indicated U.S. combat units were leaving the area, and were assisting the local population in returning to the now heavily damaged city.

=== Combat awards ===
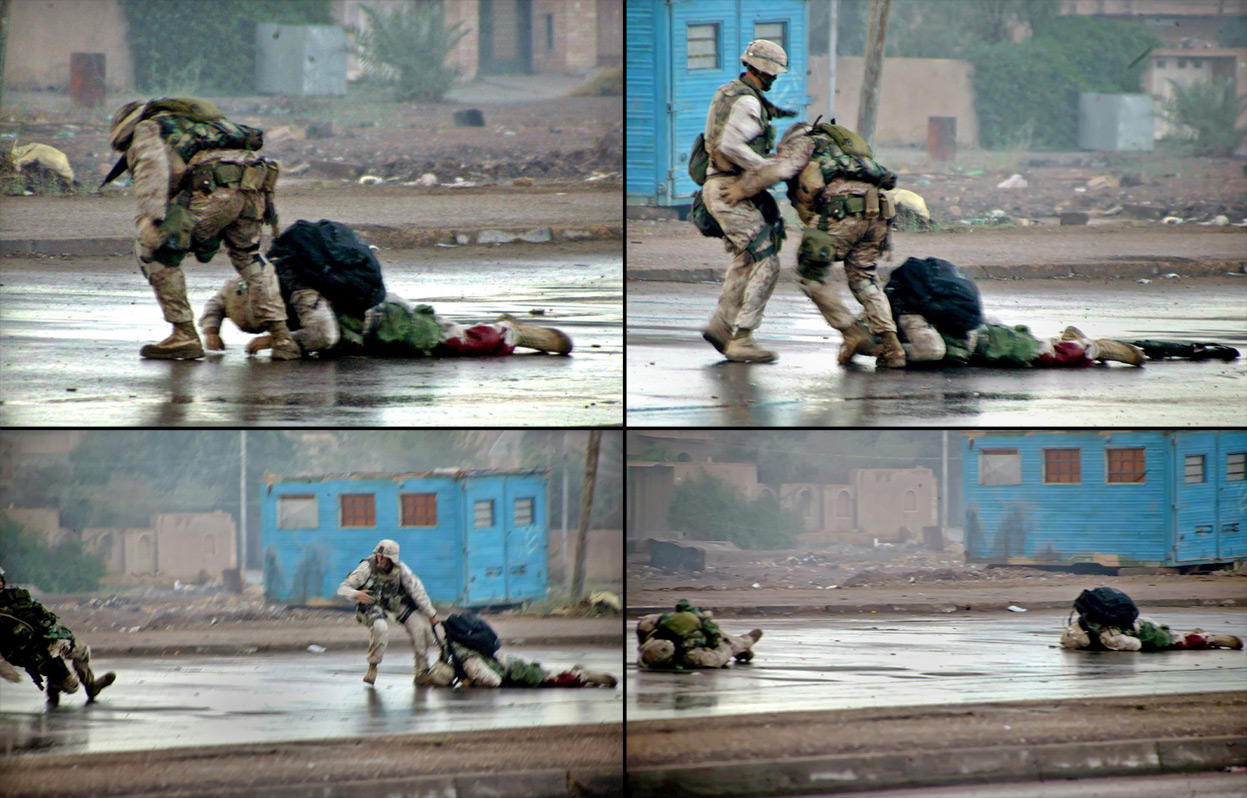
In this series of photographs a Marine and Corpsman from 1st Battalion 8th Marines attempt to recover a Marine wounded by a sniper; an insurgent machine-gunner hits one of the rescuers.

Staff Sergeant David Bellavia of the Army Task Force 2-2 Infantry was awarded the Medal of Honor.

Ten Marines were awarded the Navy Cross:

- Sergeant Rafael Peralta of 1st Battalion, 3rd Marines
- First Sergeant Bradley Kasal of 3rd Battalion, 1st Marines
- Sergeant Robert Mitchell, Jr. of 3rd Battalion, 1st Marines
- Corporal Jeremiah Workman of 3rd Battalion, 5th Marines
- Lance Corporal Christopher S. Adlesperger of 3rd Battalion, 5th Marines
- Corporal Jason S. Clairday of 3rd Battalion, 5th Marines
- Sergeant Jarrett Kraft of 3rd Battalion, 5th Marines
- Staff Sergeant Aubrey McDade of 1st Battalion, 8th Marines
- Staff Sergeant Shaun Zysk 2nd Force Recon Scout Sniper (Wounded by insurgent mortars after engaging an insurgent with a RPG from a rooftop 267 yards away)from
- Corporal Dominic Esquibel of 1st Battalion, 8th Marines

Corporal Esquibel refused the award, citing "personal reasons".

The following were awarded the Presidential Unit Citation for actions during the battle:

- U.S. Army Task Force 2nd Battalion, 2nd Infantry Regiment, 1st Infantry Division
- U.S. Army Task Force 2nd Battalion, 7th Cavalry Regiment, 1st Cavalry Division
- Naval Special Warfare Task Group-Central

== Aftermath ==
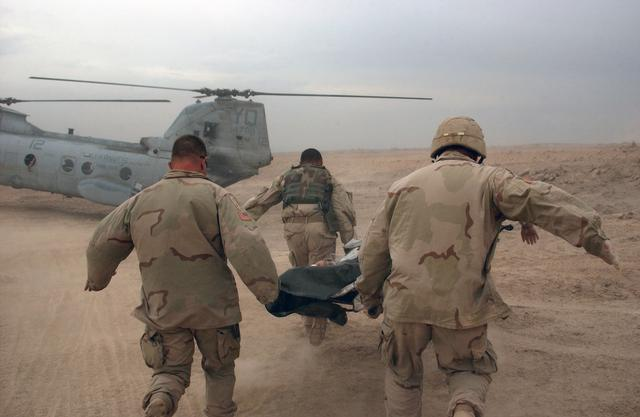
U.S. Army Soldiers rush a wounded soldier to a waiting U.S. Marine CH-46E Sea Knight helicopter during the Second Battle of Fallujah in November 2004.

The battle proved to be the bloodiest of the war and the bloodiest battle involving U.S. Marines since the Vietnam War. Comparisons with the Battle of Hue City and the Pacific campaign of World War II were made. Coalition forces suffered a total of 107 killed and 613 wounded during Operation Phantom Fury. U.S. forces had 54 killed and 425 wounded in the initial attack in November. By 23 December when the operation was officially concluded, the casualty number had risen to 95 killed and 560 wounded. British forces had 4 killed and 10 wounded in two separate attacks in the outskirts of Fallujah. Iraqi forces suffered 8 killed and 43 wounded. Estimates of insurgent casualties are complicated by a lack of official figures. Most estimates place the number of insurgents killed at around 1,200 to 1,500, with some estimations as high as over 2,000 killed. Coalition forces also captured approximately 1,500 insurgents during the operation.

The 1st Marine Division fired a total of 5,685 high-explosive 155mm artillery rounds during the battle. The 3rd Marine Air Wing (aviation assets only) expended 318 precision bombs, 391 rockets and missiles, and 93,000 machine gun and cannon rounds.

Fallujah suffered extensive damage to residences, mosques, city services, and businesses. The city, once referred to as the "City of Mosques", had over 200 mosques prior to the battle; approximately 60 were destroyed in the fighting. Many of these mosques had been used as arms caches and weapon strongpoints by Islamist forces. Of the roughly 50,000 buildings in Fallujah, between 7,000 and 10,000 were estimated to have been destroyed in the offensive and from half to two-thirds of the remaining buildings had notable damage.

While pre-offensive inhabitant figures are unreliable, the nominal population was assumed to have been 200,000–350,000. One report states that both offensives, Operation Vigilant Resolve and Operation Phantom Fury, created 200,000 internally displaced persons who are still living elsewhere in Iraq. While damage to mosques was heavy, coalition forces reported that 26 out of the city's 133 mosques had been found to be holding significant amounts of insurgent weaponry.

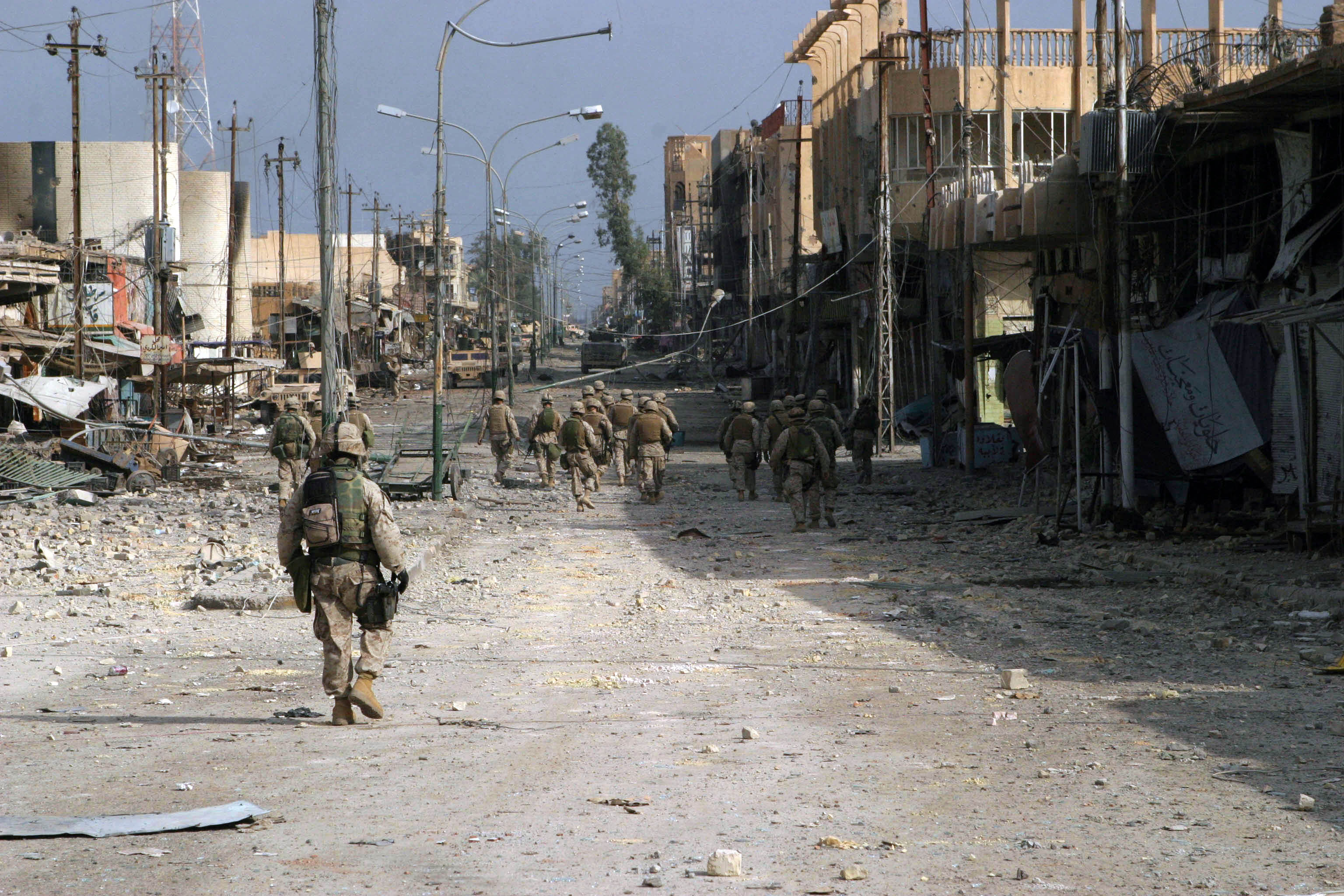
A city street in Fallujah heavily damaged by the fighting.

In mid-December, residents were allowed to return after undergoing biometric identification, provided they wore their ID cards all the time. Reconstruction progressed slowly and mainly consisted of clearing rubble from heavily damaged areas and reestablishing basic utilities. Only 10% of the pre-offensive inhabitants had returned as of mid-January, and only 30% as of the end of March 2005.

Nevertheless, the battle proved to be less than the decisive engagement that the U.S. military had hoped for. Some of the nonlocal insurgents, along with Zarqawi, were believed to have fled before the military assault, leaving mostly local militants behind. Subsequent U.S. military operations against insurgent positions were ineffective at drawing out insurgents into another open battle, and by September 2006, the situation had deteriorated to the point that the Al-Anbar province that contained Fallujah was reported to be in total insurgent control by the U.S. Marine Corps, with the exception of only pacified Fallujah, but now with an insurgent-plagued Ramadi.

After the U.S. military operation of November 2004, the number of insurgent attacks gradually increased in and around the city, and although news reports were often few and far between, several reports of IED attacks on Iraqi troops were reported in the press. Most notable of these attacks was a suicide car bomb attack on 23 June 2005 on a convoy that killed 6 Marines. Thirteen other Marines were injured in the attack. However, fourteen months later insurgents were again able to operate in large numbers.

A third push was mounted from September 2006 and lasted until mid-January 2007. Tactics developed in what has been called the "Third Battle of Fallujah," when applied on a larger scale in Ramadi and the surrounding area, led to what became known as "the Great Sunni Awakening." After four years of bitter fighting, Fallujah was turned over to the Iraqi Forces and the Iraqi Provincial Authority during the autumn of 2007.

Al Qaeda-linked Sunni insurgents from the Islamic State in Iraq and the Levant subsequently took over Fallujah and parts of Ramadi in early 2014 and the city was reclaimed by the Iraqi Army and Special Operations Units in June 2016.

== Order of battle ==
=== American forces ===
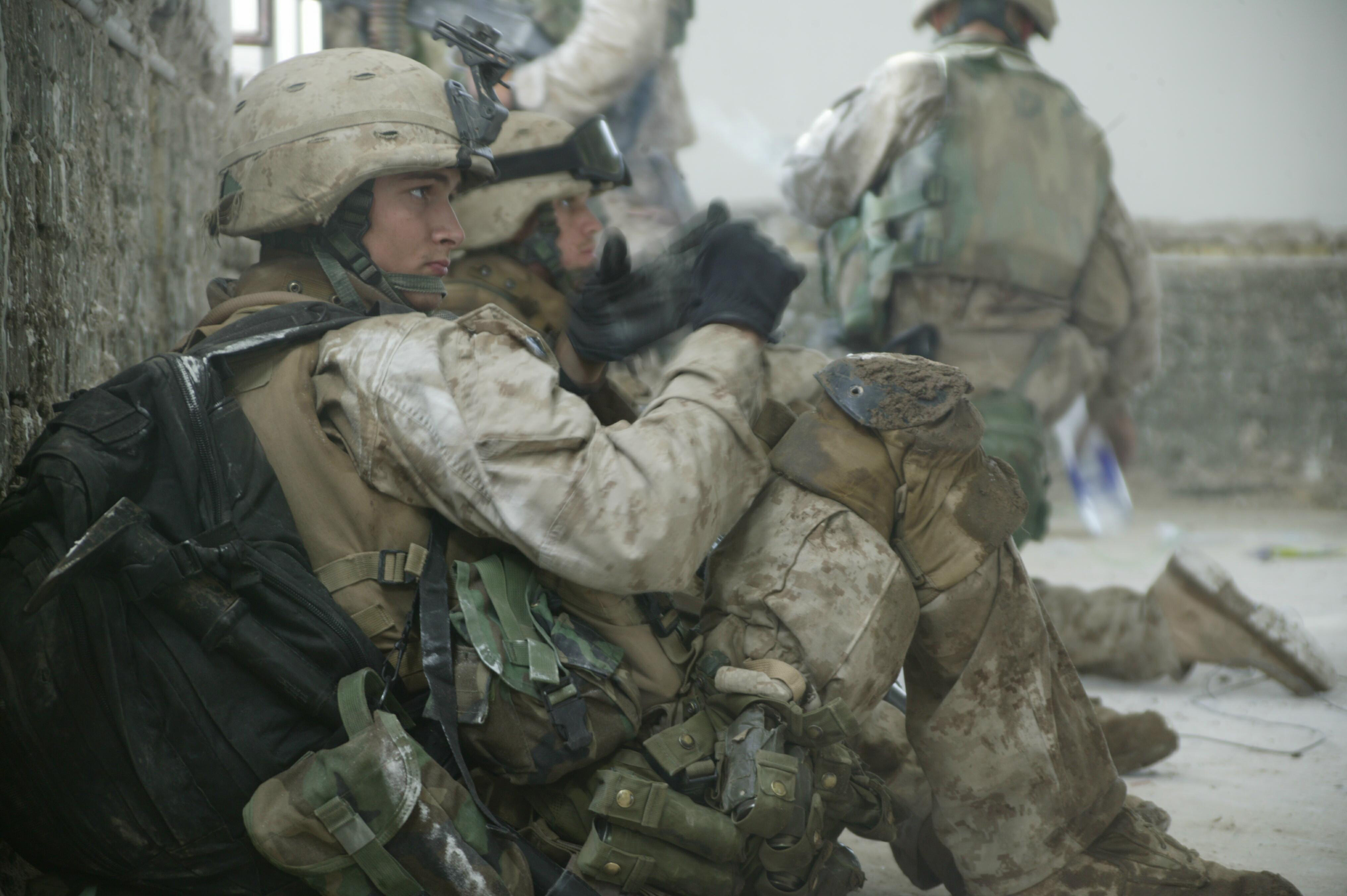
U.S. Marines take a break while searching the city of Fallujah in November 2004.

Regimental Combat Team 1 (RCT-1) built around the 1st Marine Regiment:

- 3rd Battalion 1st Marines (Infantry)
- 3rd Battalion 5th Marines (Infantry)
- 2nd Battalion, 7th Cavalry (1st Cavalry Division)
- 2nd Tank Battalion, Co. C
- 1st Force Reconnaissance Company
- 2nd Force Reconnaissance Company
- 3rd Light Armored Reconnaissance Battalion (Mechanized) (Armored)
- 1st Platoon, Company C, 3rd Battalion, 153rd Infantry Regiment, 39th Brigade Combat Team
- Companies C and D, 2nd Assault Amphibian Battalion (Armored)
- 1st, 2nd and 3rd Platoon, Company A, 3rd Assault Amphibian Battalion Armored
- 1st Battalion 9th Infantry Regiment "Manchu" Mechanized, 1st and 2nd Platoon, C.Co, 2nd Brigade Combat Team, 2nd Infantry Division(U.S. Army)
- Counter Battery Radar Platoon, 14th Marine Regiment (Artillery)
- 4th Battalion 14th Marines – Mike Battery Palehorse (Provisional Infantry, Scout and Targeting Forward Observation Sections, and Primary Direct Support Artillery)
- Company C, 3rd Battalion, 8th Cavalry Regiment, (U.S. Army)
- 2nd Platoon, Company B, 2nd Battalion, 162nd Infantry (U.S. Army)
- 2D Platoon, Alpha Company, 876 Combat Engineer Battalion
- 3rd Platoon, Company E, 3rd Assault Amphibian Battalion Armored
- TOW Platoon (-), 23rd Marines
- Scout Platoon, Headquarters & Service Company, 4th Tank Battalion
- Scout Platoon, 2nd Tank Battalion (Attached to HQ Btry. 2nd Battalion, 10th Marines Battalion 10th Marines)
- Company A, MP Battalion, 2nd Marine Logistics Group, 2nd Marine Division
- Company B, (reinforced), 2nd Combat Engineer Battalion, 2nd Marine Division
- Military Police Company A, 4th Marine Logistics Group, 4th Marine Division
- Detachment 4, 4th Civil Affairs Group
- Combat Logistics Company 115, Combat Logistics Battalion 1, 1st Marine Logistics Group
- Bravo Surgical Company, 1st Medical Battalion, 1st Force Service Support Group
- Shock Trauma Platoon, 1st Marine Logistics Group
- Company B, 1st Battalion, 4th Marines
- Company B, 1st Battalion, 23rd Marines
- Evac Platoon, Company C, 181 SPT Battalion, 81 HBCT
- 2nd Battalion 11th Marines, Kilo 3/12, Golf, HQ Btry (Artillery- Serving as Provisionary Rifle Companies)
- Charlie Btry. 1st Battalion 10th Marines (Artillery- Serving as Provisional Infantry Company, attached to 2nd Battalion, 10th Marines, w/direct support by 2 teams from STA Platoon, HQ Btry. 2nd Battalion 10th Marines)
- Lima Battery, 3rd Battalion, 10th Marines Battalion, 10th Marines (Artillery- Serving as Provisional Infantry Company, attached to 2nd Battalion, 10th Marines w/direct support from 2 teams of STA Platoon, HQ Btry. 2/10)
- 4th Battalion 14th Marines, Kilo Btry (Artillery- Serving as Provisional Infantry Company, Attached to 2nd Battalion, 10th Marines, 2 Mar Div.)
- Motor Transport Platoon (HQ Btry. 2nd Battalion 10th Marines)
- Task Force ECHO (NMCB (Naval Mobile Construction Battalion) FOUR, NMCB TWO THREE, and Company A, 120th Engineer Battalion Oklahoma National Guard)
- Marine Unmanned Aerial Vehicle Squadron 1 (VMU-1) at Al Taquaddum Airbase
- Marine Aircraft Group 39 – HMLA-367, HMLA-169 DET A, HMM-161, HMM-364 and HMM-268 at Al Taqaddum Airbase
- VMFA(AW)-242, VMA-542, HMM-365 at Al Asad Air Base
- 3rd Squad, 3rd Platoon, A Co, 44th Engineer Battalion, 2nd Brigade, 2nd Inf Div
- 3rd Platoon, A Co, 2/72 Tank Battalion, 2nd Infantry Division (U.S. Army)
- B Company, 9th Psychological Operations Battalion, Airborne (U.S. Army)
- H&S and C Cos. 4th Combat Engineer Battalion
- Naval Mobile Construction Battalion 4 (Seabees)
- Naval Mobile Construction Battalion 23 (Seabees)
- Naval Mobile Construction Battalion 133 (Seabees)

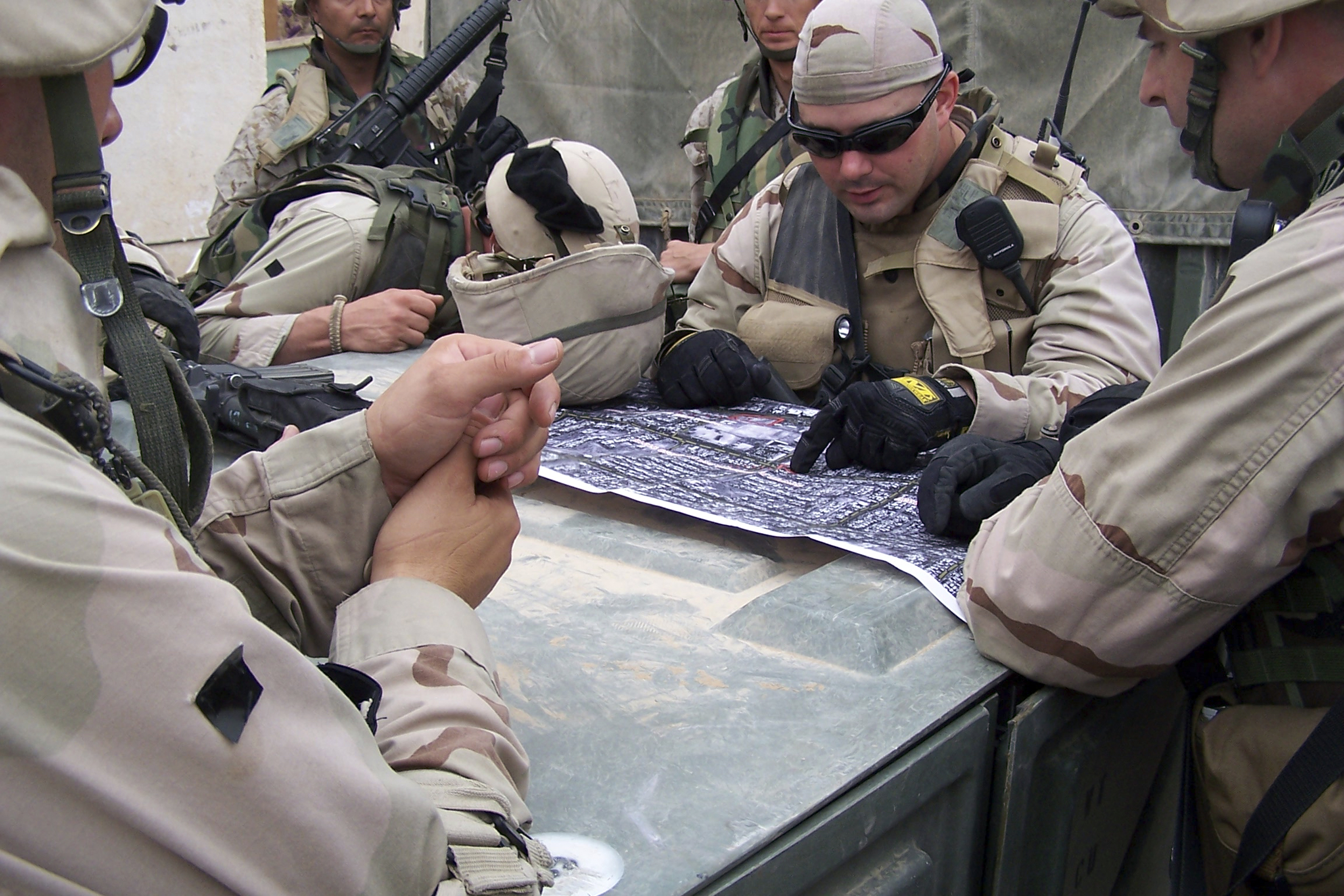
A Chief Engineering Aide assigned to Naval Mobile Construction Battalion 4 studies an aerial photograph of the streets in Fallujah in November 2004.

Regimental Combat Team 7 (RCT-7) built around the 7th Marine Regiment:

- 1st Battalion 3rd Marines (Infantry)
- 1st Battalion 8th Marines (Infantry)
- 2nd Battalion, 2nd Infantry Regiment, 1st Infantry Division
- 2nd Tank Battalion, Co. A
- 2nd Reconnaissance Battalion
- 2nd Force Reconnaissance Company
- 1st Light Armored Reconnaissance Battalion, Co. C
- 2nd Light Armored Reconnaissance Battalion, Co. A
- Tactical PSYOP Team 1171 (USAR), 1/3 Marines (attached)
- 2nd Platoon, Alpha Company, 82nd Engineer Battalion
- F Troop, 4th Cavalry (Brigade Reconnaissance Troop)
- Alpha Company, 2nd Battalion, 63rd Armor Regiment
- Bravo Company 1st Battalion, 63rd Armored Regiment
- 1st Platoon, Charlie Company, 82nd Engineer Battalion
- 1st Platoon, Alpha Battery, 1st Battalion, 6th Field Artillery Regiment (M109A6, 155mm SP)
- 1st Battalion 12th Marines – Battery "C" (Artillery)
- F Troop, 4th Cavalry, 3rd Brigade Reconnaissance Troop, 1st Infantry Division (U.S. Army)
- Company C, 2nd Combat Engineer Battalion
- 2nd Platoon, C Company, 44th Engineer Battalion, 2nd Brigade, 2nd Infantry Division (U.S. Army)
- Company C, 2nd Assault Amphibian Battalion (Armored)
- Company B, MP Battalion, 4th Marine Logistics Group
- 3rd Platoon, Combat Engineer Company, Combat Assault Battalion, 3rd Marine Division
- 2nd Platoon, Company C, 3rd Assault Amphibian Battalion
- 1st Platoon, Engineer Company C, 6th Engineer Support Battalion
- MEU Service Support Group 31, 31st Marine Expeditionary Unit
- Explosive Ordnance Disposal Mobile Unit THREE
- B Company, 445th Civil Affairs Battalion (U.S. Army)
- A Troop 2nd Squadron, 14th Cavalry (U.S. Army)
- Alpha Company, 458th Engineer Battalion, Engineer Brigade, 1st Cavalry Division (U.S. Army)
- 759th Military Police Battalion Composite (U.S. Army)
  - HHD, 759th Military Police Battalion (FWD)
  - 148th Military Police Team (FWD) (Police Intelligence)
  - 21st Military Police Company (Airborne) (Combat Support)
  - 630th Military Police Company (Combat Support)
  - 984th Military Police Company (Combat Support)
- 15th Forward Support Battalion
- 2nd Brigade, 1st Cavalry Division TAC (Bravo Company, 13th Signal, E-31; Bravo Company, 312th Military Intel)
- 689th Engineer Company (Clearance) (U.S. Army Reserve)
- 1st Squadron, 124th Cavalry
- CROWS Team One
- Small Craft Company Special Operations River Recon

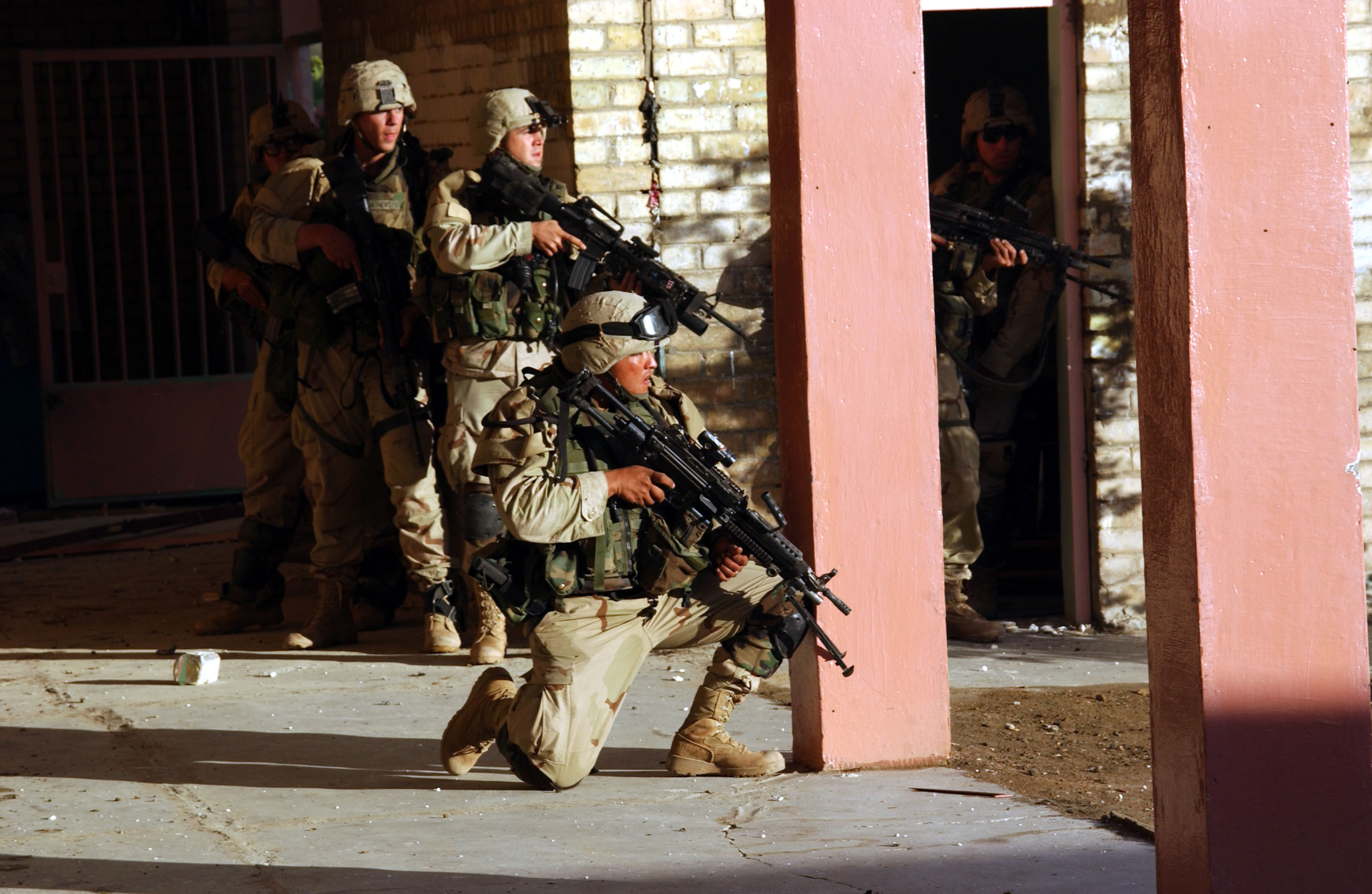
U.S. Army Soldiers use a wall and a pillar as a shield while they tactically enter and clear a building in Fallujah in November 2004.

Ninth Air Force (United States Air Forces Central Command) (U.S. Air Force)

- 24th Special Tactics Squadron
- 187th Fighter Wing (Alabama Air National Guard) (F-16 Fighting Falcon)
- 379th Air Expeditionary Wing (F-15 Strike Eagle, F-16 Fighting Falcon, A-10 Thunderbolt II, AC-130 Gunship)
- 2d Bomb Wing (B-52 Stratofortress)
- 9th Reconnaissance Wing (U-2 Dragon Lady)
- 116th Air Control Wing (E-8 Joint STARS)
- 432d Air Expeditionary Wing (MQ-1 Predator drones, operated remotely from Creech Air Force Base, Nevada)

U.S. Special Operations Command

- Naval Special Warfare Task Group-Central (Sniper Elements Alpha, Bravo, and Charlie from SEAL Teams 3, 5, 8, and SDVT-1)
- 1st Special Forces Operational Detachment-Delta
- Det One
- 5th Special Forces Group

=== Iraqi forces ===
- 1st Specialized Special Forces Battalion (Iraqi National Guard), Companies D and B
- Iraqi 36th Commando Battalion
- Iraqi Counter Terrorism Forces Battalion
- Emergency Response Unit (Iraqi-Ministry of Interior) – Attached to RCT-7
- 1st Battalion, 1st Brigade, Iraqi Intervention Force (ICDC) – Operated independently of Coalition forces
- 2nd Battalion, 1st Brigade, Iraqi Intervention Force (IIF) – Attached to RCT-7
- 4th Battalion, 1st Brigade, Iraqi Intervention Force (IIF) – Attached to RCT-1
- 5th Battalion, 3rd Brigade, Iraqi Intervention Force (IIF) – Attached to RCT-7
- 6th Battalion, 3rd Brigade, Iraqi Intervention Force (IIF) – Attached to 2nd Brigade, 1st Cavalry Division

=== British forces ===
- 1st Battalion, The Black Watch

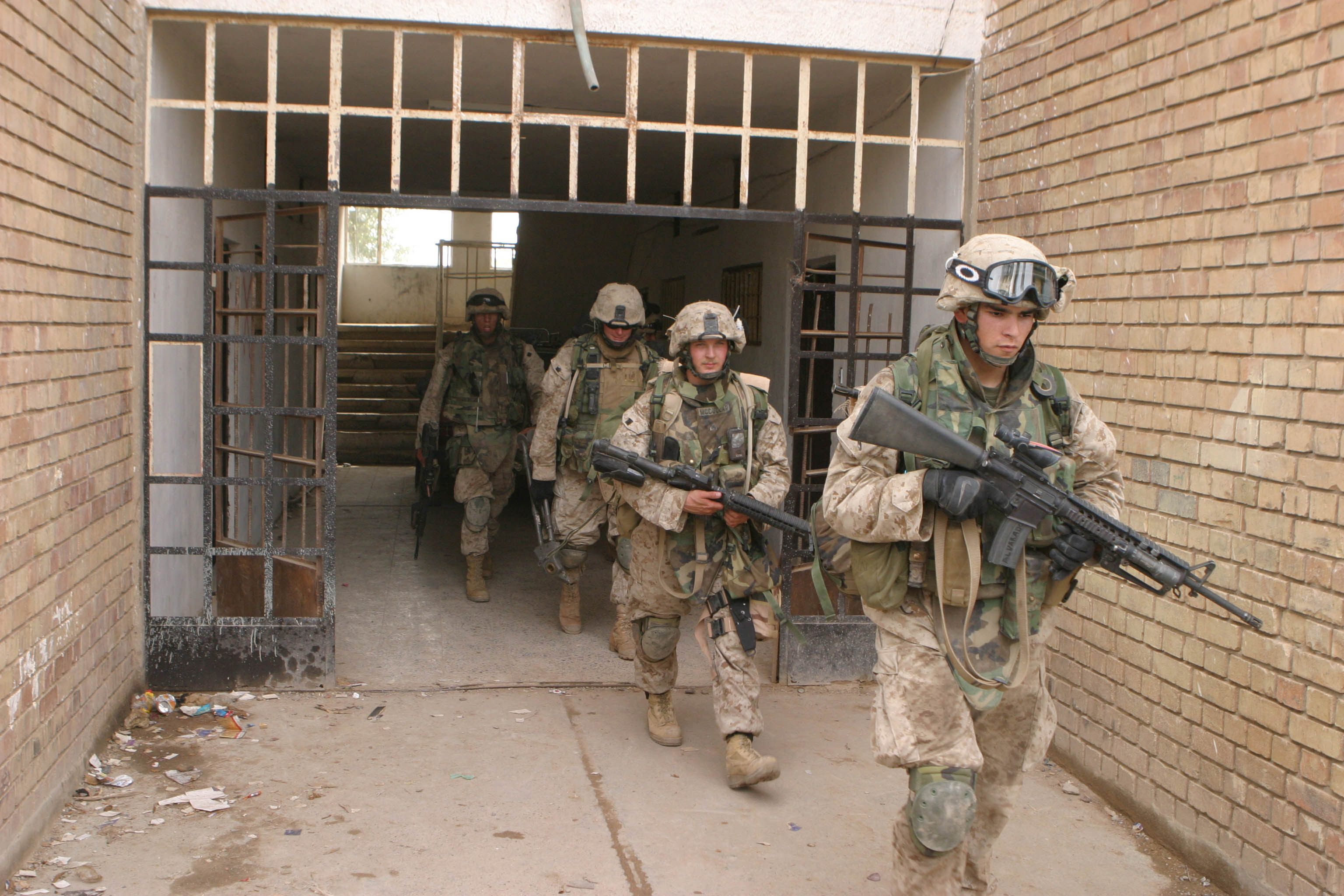
U.S. Marines from the 3rd Battalion 5th Marines seize apartments at the edge of Fallujah in November 2004.

== Criticisms ==
There were numerous criticisms relating to the United States' tactics during the battle, including the weapons used, civilian casualties, and collateral damage.

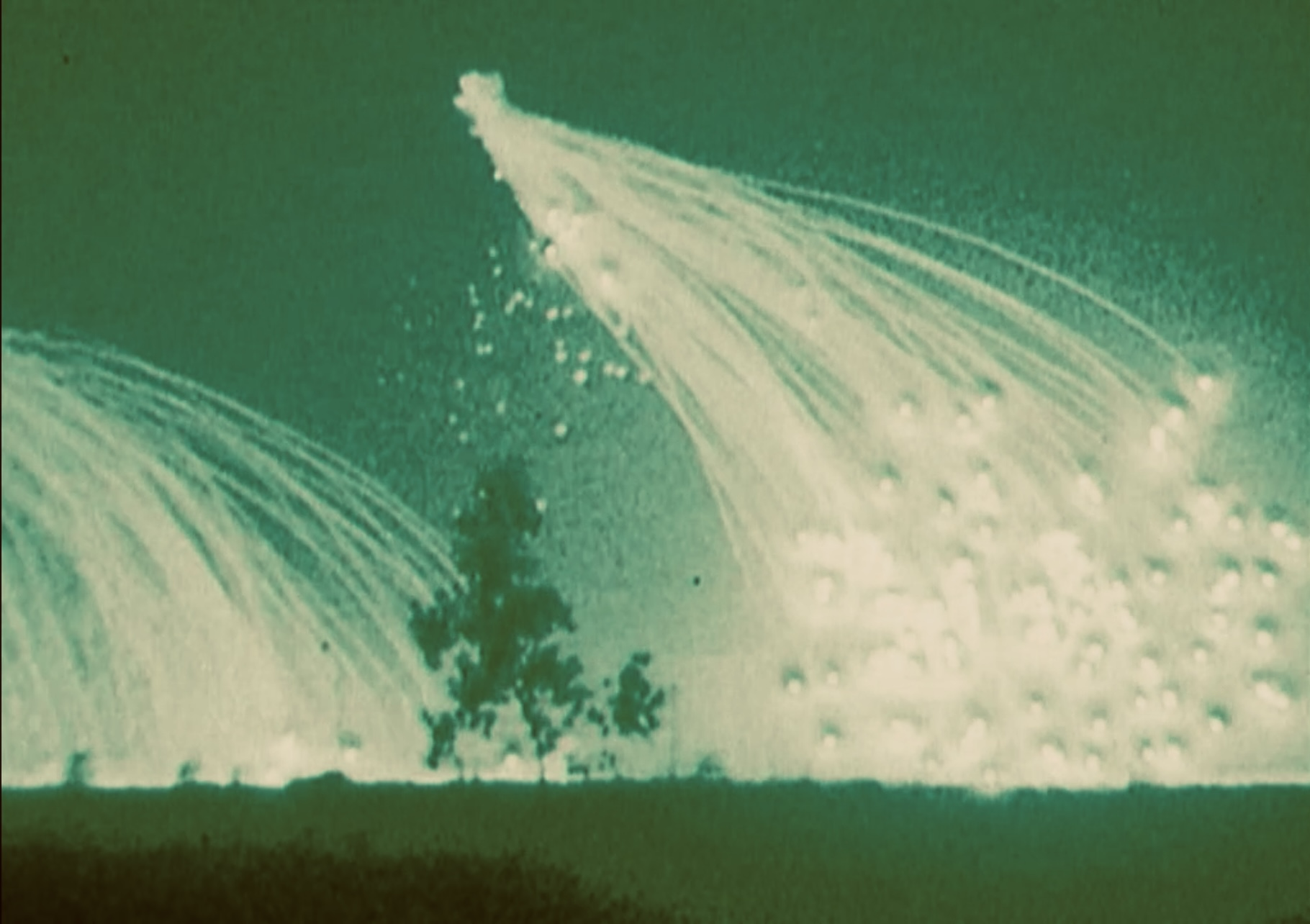
White phosphorus air burst during the Second Battle of Fallujah

=== Use of white phosphorus as a weapon ===
The use of white phosphorus during the battle was first reported on November 10, 2004, by Washington Post reporters who were embedded with Task Force 2-2, Regimental Combat Team 7 reported that they witnessed artillery guns firing white phosphorus projectiles which "create a screen of fire that cannot be extinguished with water. Insurgents reported being attacked with a substance that melted their skin, a reaction consistent with white phosphorous [sic] burns." The article also reported, "The corpses of the mujaheddin which we received were burned, and some corpses were melted."

On November 8, 2005, the national public broadcasting company of Italy, Radiotelevisione Italiana S.p.A. aired a documentary titled "Fallujah, The Hidden Massacre", which reported that the United States had used white phosphorus as a weapon in Fallujah, and which showed that insurgents and civilians, including women and children, had been killed or injured by chemical burns. Included were graphic video and photos of severe and deep chemical burns that penetrated the flesh and bones of men, women, and children. The filmmakers claimed that the United States used incendiary MK-77 bombs in violation of Protocol III of the 1980 Convention on Certain Conventional Weapons, a convention to which the United States was not a party until 2009.

According to the Organization for the Prohibition of Chemical Weapons, quoted in the documentary, white phosphorus is permitted for use as an illumination device and as a weapon with regard to heat energy, but not permitted as an offensive weapon with regard to its chemical properties.

On November 15, 2005, the US ambassador to the United Kingdom, Robert Tuttle, wrote to The Independent denying that the United States used white phosphorus as a weapon in Fallujah. However, later the same day, US Department of Defense spokesman Lieutenant Colonel Barry Venable confirmed to the BBC that US forces had used white phosphorus as an incendiary weapon there. Venable also stated "When you have enemy forces that are in covered positions that your high explosive artillery rounds are not having an impact on and you wish to get them out of those positions, one technique is to fire a white phosphorus round into the position because the combined effects of the fire and smoke – and in some case the terror brought about by the explosion on the ground – will drive them out of the holes so that you can kill them with high explosives."

On November 16, 2005, BBC News reported that an article published in the March–April 2005 issue of Field Artillery, a U.S. Army magazine, noted that white phosphorus had been used during the battle. According to the article, "WP (White Phosphorus) proved to be an effective and versatile munition. We used it for screening missions at two breeches and, later in the fight, as a potent psychological weapon against the insurgents in trench lines and spider holes where we could not get effects on them with HE [High Explosives]. We fired "shake and bake" missions at the insurgents, using WP to flush them out and HE to take them out."

=== Killing of wounded ===
On 16 November 2004, NBC News aired footage that showed a U.S. Marine killing a wounded Iraqi fighter. In this video, the Marine was heard saying that the Iraqi was "playing possum". NCIS investigators later determined that the Marine was acting in self-defense.

=== Prevention of military-age males from fleeing Fallujah ===
Agence France-Presse (AFP) and other news agencies reported that military-age males, 15 to 50 years old, were prevented from leaving the city before the battle began by the U.S. military. All entrances to the city were controlled by U.S. forces.

The Guardian's George Monbiot wrote:

Before attacking the city, the marines stopped men "of fighting age" from leaving. Many women and children stayed: the Guardian's correspondent estimated that between 30,000 and 50,000 civilians were left. The marines treated Falluja as if its only inhabitants were fighters. They leveled thousands of buildings, illegally denied access to the Iraqi Red Crescent and, according to the UN's special rapporteur, used "hunger and deprivation of water as a weapon of war against the civilian population".

=== Civilian casualties ===
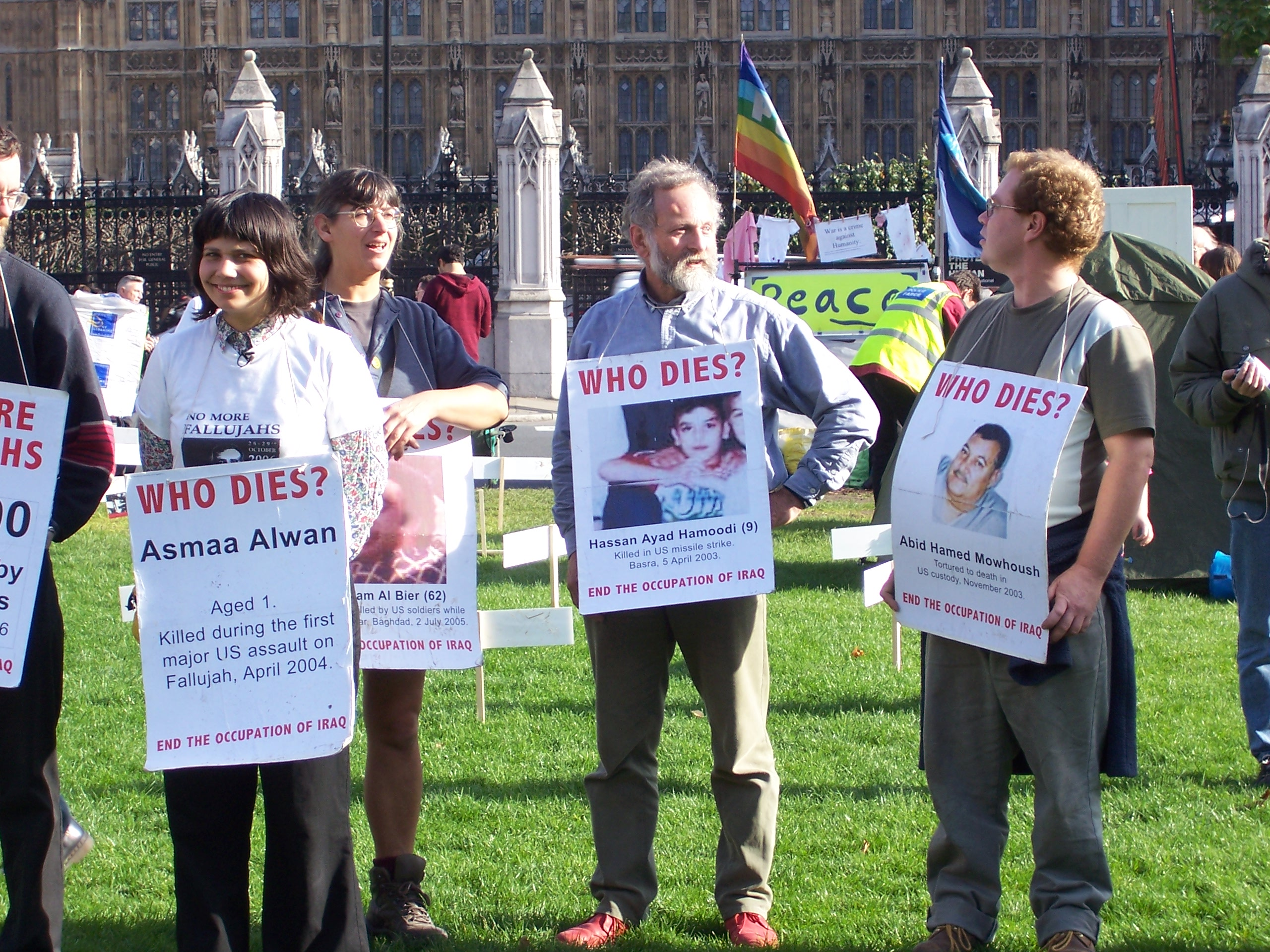
Demonstration in front of the British parliament against the war and the consequences of the Second Battle of Fallujah in 2006.

The Red Cross estimated directly following the battle that some 800 civilians had been killed during the offensive. The Iraq Body Count project reported between 581 and 670 civilian deaths resulting from the battle. Mike Marqusee, in a November 2005 article for The Guardian, wrote that "The US claims that 2,000 died, most of them fighters. Other sources disagree. When medical teams arrived in January they collected more than 700 bodies in only one third of the city. Iraqi NGOs and medical workers estimate between 4,000 and 6,000 dead, mostly civilians".

"There were American snipers on top of the hospital shooting everyone," said Burhan Fasa'am, a photographer with the Lebanese Broadcasting Corporation. "With no medical supplies, people died from their wounds. Everyone in the street was a target for the Americans."

=== Depleted uranium ===
US forces used depleted uranium (DU) shells during the battle. Depleted uranium shells use very dense and non-fissile (but still radioactive) uranium left over from enrichment, for effective armor penetration. They also disperse DU dust into the environment during impact. A July 2009 paper by Buzby et al. reported a high level of cancer, birth defects and infant mortality, according to a house-to-house survey in Fallujah. A 2011 study of elemental contaminants in the hair of parents children with abnormalities, by Alaani et al., concludes "these findings suggest the enriched Uranium exposure is either a primary cause or related to the cause of the congenital anomaly and cancer increases." A 2012 journal article by Al-Hadithi et al., says existing studies and research evidence do not show a "clear increase in birth defects" or a "clear indication of a possible environmental exposure including depleted uranium". The article says "there is actually no substantial evidence that genetic defects can arise from parental exposure to DU in any circumstances." The results of a 2010 study at Fallujah General Hospital, published in 2012, concluded that, "the higher rates of congenital anomalies are believed to be caused by exposure to some genotoxic agent, possibly uranium."

== In popular culture ==
=== Documentaries ===
- Occupation: Dreamland, a 2005 documentary film that follows soldiers of the 1/505 of the 82nd Airborne Division in Fallujah, Iraq, in the beginning of 2004.
- Shootout! – Episode 1: D-Day: Fallujah (UPC: 733961741353), a 2006 A&E History Channel Special detailing various gun battles that occurred during the Second Battle of Fallujah.
- The Road to Fallujah, a 2009 documentary following the story of Mark Manning, the only westerner to live among the residents of Fallujah following the November 2004 battle.
- Fear Not the Path of Truth, a 2013 documentary film from Ross Caputi, a veteran of the 2nd siege of Fallujah who investigates atrocities that occurred and the legacy of US foreign policy in Fallujah.
- Fallujah, The Hidden Massacre, a documentary investigating the use of white phosphorus and the MK-77 by the U.S. Army during the battle.
- Once Upon a Time in Iraq, a 2020 BBC documentary series, featured the Battle of Fallujah in its third episode.

=== Films ===
- Pasaje al amanecer, a 2017 war drama which is based on the Christmas Eve before the war.

=== Games ===
- Six Days in Fallujah, span of the six bloodiest days in the battle for Fallujah. It was dropped by Konami for the controversy surrounding it and remained in limbo until 2021. The restarted game was announced in 2021 with publishing of Victura and developed by Highwire Games. Early access release was in June 2023, and follows 3rd Battalion, 1st Marines (3/1) as they fight the Iraqi insurgency in the city of Fallujah, Iraq.
- Close Combat: First to Fight, is a video game that was also designed with input from former and active-duty U.S. Marines from 3rd Battalion, 1st Marines, who had participated in combat around Fallujah, Iraq during Operation Phantom Fury.
- Phantom Fury: The 2nd Battle for Fallujah, is a solitaire board game based on the actions of 3rd Battalion, 1st Marine Regiment, 1st Marine Division in the Jolan district in November 2004.
- Squad, a 2020 tactical first-person shooter contains Fallujah as one of the playable maps, inspired on the Second Battle of Fallujah.

=== Music ===
- "In Old Yellowcake", song by Rasputina (2007)
- "Christmas in Fallujah", song by Jefferson Pepper (2005) (UPC: 669910486467)
- "Christmas in Fallujah", song by Cass Dillon and Billy Joel (2007) (Digital download, CD single)
- Fallujah, an opera with music by the Canadian composer Tobin Stokes and libretto by Heather Raffo.
- "Fallujah" by Serbian roots reggae band FC Apartride Utd, On The Frontline Menu 2006, LP
- "Idhrib Ya Asad Al Fallujah(Strike oh Lions of Fallujah)", song by Ali Al-Faridawi and Hussein Ghazal
- Fallujah is an American technical death metal band from San Francisco, California, formed in 2007.

=== Books ===
- No True Glory: A Frontline Account of the Battle for Fallujah
- My Men are My Heroes: The Brad Kasal Story
- We Were One: Shoulder to Shoulder with the Marines Who Took Fallujah
- New Dawn: The Battles for Fallujah
- Operation Phantom Fury: The Assault and Capture of Fallujah, Iraq
- Sunrise Over Fallujah
- Fallujah Memoirs: A Grunt's Eye View of the Second Battle of Fallujah
- Ghosts of Fallujah
- U.S. Marines in Battle: Fallujah, November–December 2004
- House to House: An Epic Memoir of War
- Code Red Fallujah: A Doctor's Memoir at War
- Fallujah, with Honor; First Battalion, Eighth Marine's Role in Operation Phantom Fury; Expanded 2nd Edition
- All Of Which I Saw
- American Sniper

== See also ==
- 2003 invasion of Iraq
- 2004 in Iraq
- Battle of Mosul (2004)
- Operation Alljah

== Bibliography ==
Tucker, Spencer C. (2014). Battles That Changed American History: 100 of the Greatest Victories and Defeats. ABC-CLIO. ISBN 978-1440828614.
