= Fajr-3 =

Fajr-3 may refer to:

- Fajr-3 (artillery rocket), a multiple-launch artillery rocket, a third-generation Katyusha rocket
- Fajr-3 (missile), a medium-range ballistic missile with an unknown range
- Fajr-3 (aircraft), an Iranian four-seat aircraft
- Operation Dawn 3 (a.k.a. Operation Valfajr-3), an Iranian offensive in the 8-year long Iran-Iraq War

== See also ==
- Fajr (disambiguation)
