= Aubrey McDade =

American Marine and Navy Cross recipient

Aubrey Leon McDade Jr.
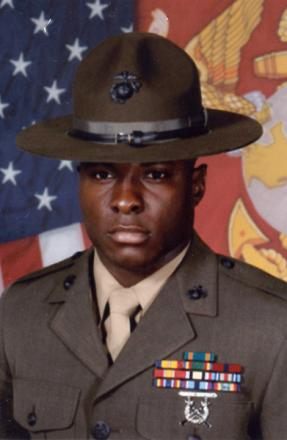
- McDade in 2007
- Born: July 29, 1981 (age 45); Pasadena, California, U.S.
- Military career
- Allegiance: United States
- Branch: United States Marine Corps
- Service years: 1999–2019
- Rank: Gunnery sergeant
- Unit: 1st Battalion, 8th Marines
- Conflicts: Iraq War: Operation Iraqi Freedom
- Awards: Navy Cross; Navy and Marine Corps Achievement Medal

Aubrey Leon McDade Jr. (born July 29, 1981) is a retired United States Marine who was awarded the Navy Cross for his actions in the Iraq War, in which he rescued two U.S. Marines during an enemy ambush during the Second Battle of Fallujah, in November 2004. He is the fifteenth U.S. Marine to receive the Navy Cross in the Global War on Terrorism.

== Early life and education ==
McDade enlisted in the U.S. Marine Corps in November 1999, after graduating from Western Hills High School in Fort Worth, Texas.

== Career ==
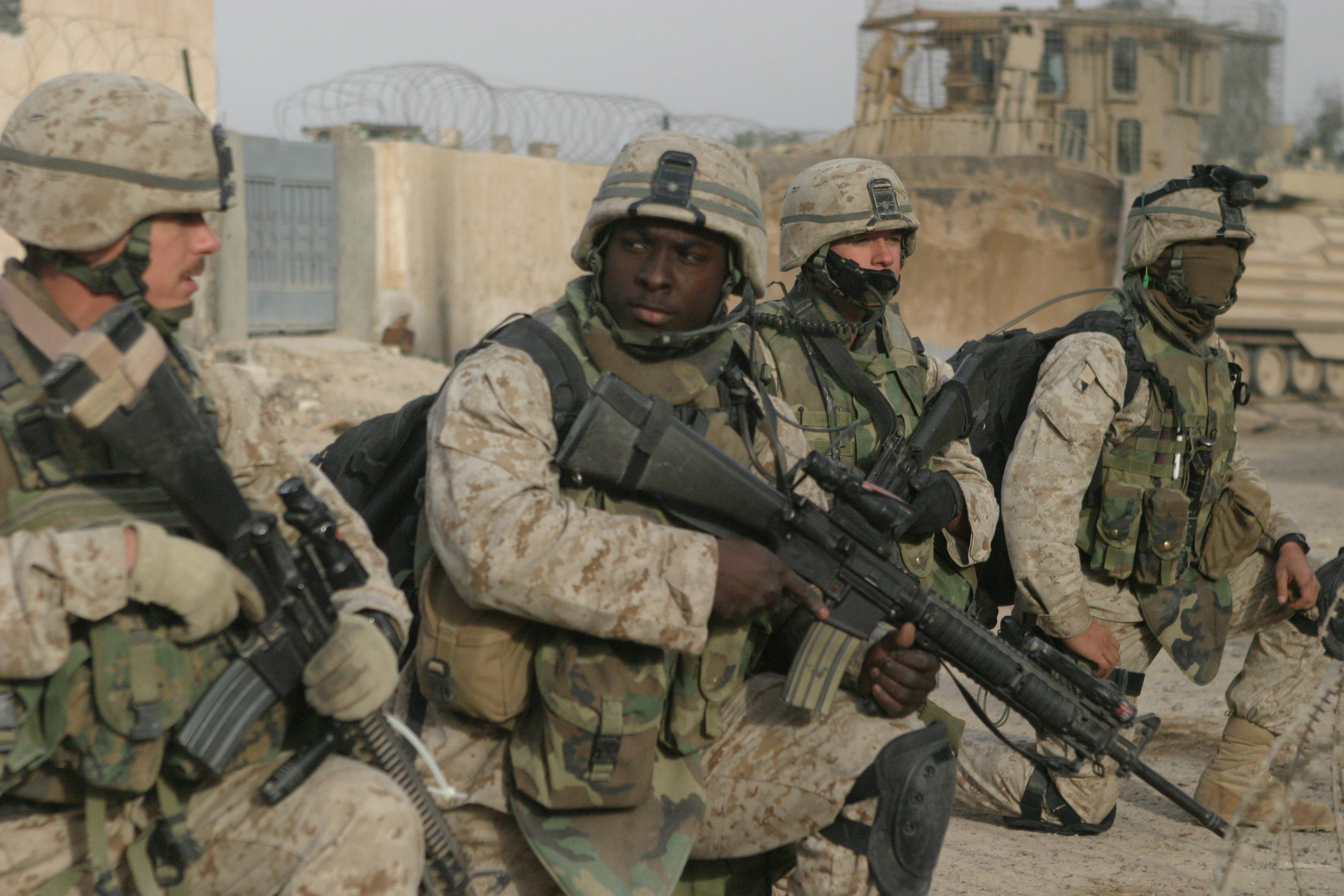
McDade in November 2004.

McDade's first tour of duty in the Iraq War was from March 2003, to October 2003. He returned to Iraq for a second deployment from June 2004 through February 2005.

=== Second Battle of Fallujah ===
On the night of November 11, 2004, during the Second Battle of Fallujah, McDade was a machine gun squad leader with 1st Battalion, 8th Marines, 2nd Marine Division, attached at the time to the Regimental Combat Team 7 (RCT 7) when his squad was attacked and pinned down by small arms and machine gun fire in an alley that injured three Marines. McDade, in the rear, rushed to the front of his squad to direct machine gun fire at the attackers. Under fire, McDade then rescued two of the wounded Marines, one at a time. The third Marine was killed in the attack and his body was recovered. McDade was originally awarded the Silver Star for his action; the award was subsequently upgraded to the Navy Cross.

=== Navy Cross ===
As a Drill Instructor training new Marine Corps recruits, Staff Sergeant McDade's Navy Cross was presented in formation during graduation of one of the recruit classes on January 19, 2007, at Marine Corps Recruit Depot Parris Island, South Carolina. Four days later Staff Sergeant McDade was the guest of First Lady Laura Bush at the State of the Union Address on January 23, 2007.

=== Navy Cross citation ===
The President of the United States of America takes pleasure in presenting the Navy Cross to Sergeant Aubrey L. McDade, Jr., United States Marine Corps, for extraordinary heroism while serving as Machine Gun Squad Leader attached to 1st Platoon, Company B, First Battalion, Eighth Marines, Regimental Combat Team 7, FIRST Marine Division, in support of Operation IRAQI FREEDOM on 11 November 2004. Shortly after departing a platoon firm base and proceeding south toward Phase Line Grace, 1st Platoon entered an alley and encountered an immediate heavy volume of small arms and machine gun fire. In the opening seconds of the engagement, three Marines were seriously wounded as the well positioned and expecting enemy pinned others down. On contact, Sergeant McDade rushed from the rear of the platoon column toward the kill zone and immediately deployed a machine gun team into the alley to provide suppressive fire on the enemy. After several attempts to reach casualties in the alley were met with heavy, well-aimed machine gun fire, he showed total disregard for his own safety by moving across the alley and successfully extracting the first of three wounded Marines from the kill zone. Aware of the fact that there were still two wounded Marines in the alley, Sergeant McDade dashed through the heart of the kill zone two more times, each time braving intense enemy fire to successfully retrieve a Marine. After extracting the last casualty from the kill zone, he assisted in the treatment and medical evacuation to these Marines. His quick thinking and aggressive actions were crucial in saving the lives of two of the three casualties. Sergeant McDade's undaunted courage, fighting spirit and total devotion to duty reflected great credit upon him and were in keeping with the highest traditions of the Marine Corps and of the United States Naval Service.

== Decorations ==
- Navy Cross
- Navy and Marine Corps Achievement Medal
- Combat Action Ribbon
- Navy Unit Commendation
- Marine Corps Good Conduct Medal
- National Defense Service Medal
- Iraq Campaign Medal
- Global War on Terrorism Expeditionary Medal
- Global War On Terrorism Service Medal
- Humanitarian Service Medal
- Navy Sea Service Deployment Ribbon
