= The Road to Fallujah =

- Theatrical still
- Directed by: Mark Manning
- Written by: Natalie Kalustian; Mark Manning
- Produced by: Rana Al-Aiouby
- Cinematography: Rana al Aiouby; Mark Manning; Isam Rasheed
- Edited by: Jimmy Giritlian; Natalie Kalustian; Neil Mandelberg; Mark Manning
- Music by: Greg Ellis
- Release date: April 2009 (Atlanta Film Festival)
- Running time: 85 minutes
- Country: United States
- Languages: English; Arabic

The Road to Fallujah is a 2009 American documentary film directed by Mark Manning and written by Manning and Natalie Kalustian.

== Synopsis ==
The documentary follows the story of Mark Manning, the only westerner to live among the residents of Fallujah, Iraq, following the November 2004 battle that destroyed the city.

== Interviews ==
- Rana al Aiouby - Humanitarian aid worker and Journalist
- Tariq Ali - Historian, novelist and political analyst
- Reza Aslan - Religion scholar
- Juan E. Campo, Ph.D. - Professor of Islamic Studies and the History of Religions, UCSB
- Dr. Hameed Tajeldin - Former Medical Doctor, Fallujah
- Paul D. Eaton - Major General US Army, Ret. Commanding General: Effort to Rebuild Iraqi Security Forces
- Arun Gandhi - Peace leader
- Thich Nhat Hanh - Peace leader
- Katy Helvenston-Wettengal - Mother of Scott Helvenston and member of lawsuit against Blackwater Security
- Dahr Jamail - Unembedded journalist in Iraq, author of "Beyond the Green Zone"
- Adam Kokesh - Sergeant, Civil Affairs NCO, Fallujah
- Dennis Kucinich -- U.S. Congressman
- Mark Manning
- Nadia McCaffery
- Nir Rosen- Unembedded journalist in Iraq
- Desmond Tutu - Peace leader
- Captain Allen Vaught - Head of Civil Military Operations, Fallujah 2003, Army Special Operations Command
- Lt. Col. Michael Zacchea - USMC Reserve, Fallujah, Senior Advisor to 5th Battalion Iraqi Army
- Donna Zovko - Mother of Jerry Zovko (murdered Blackwater Security contractor) and member of lawsuit against Blackwater Security
- Tom Zovko - Brother of Jerry Zovko
- Maxine Waters - U.S. Congresswoman

== Film festivals ==
- Atlanta Film Festival: Official selection - April 2009
- Newport Beach Film Festival: Official selection - April 2009
- Slamdance Film Festival - January 2009: Official selection
- Santa Barbara International Film Festival: Official selection - January 2009 (West Coast premiere)
- Miami International Film Festival: Official selection - March 2009 (East Coast premiere)
- Docuwest Film Festival: Official selection
- United Nations Association Film Festival: Official selection
- Temecula Valley International Film Festival: Official selection
- Bend Film Festival: Official selection

== Accolades ==
- Honolulu International Film Festival: Winner (Excellence in film making)
