= 4th Battalion, 14th Marines =

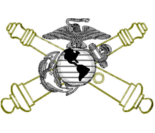
- 4th Battalion, 14th Marine's insignia
- Active: Active 2025
- Country: United States of America
- Branch: United States Marine Corps
- Type: Reserve Artillery
- Role: Provide fires in support of 4th Marine Division
- Part of: active
- Motto: "Rolling Thunder"
- Engagements: World War II: Battle of Iwo Jima; Operation Desert Storm; Iraq War

Commanders
- Current commander: Col. Richardson
- Colonel of the Regiment: Major Alexander C. Weinstein

4th Battalion, 14th Marines (4/14) was a United States Marine Corps reserve artillery battalion. It comprised three firing batteries and a headquarters battery. The battalion was based in Bessemer, Alabama and equipped with the M198 Howitzer with a maximum effective range of 30 kilometers. They were part of the 14th Marine Regiment, 4th Marine Division.

The battalion's mission was to provide artillery support to a maneuver element or reinforcing fires to another artillery organization.

== Subordinate units ==
Name	Location
Headquarters and Service Battery	Bessemer, Alabama
Battery K (Kilo Battery)	Huntsville, Alabama
Battery L (Lima Battery)	Bessemer, Alabama
Battery M (Mike Battery)	Chattanooga, Tennessee

== History ==
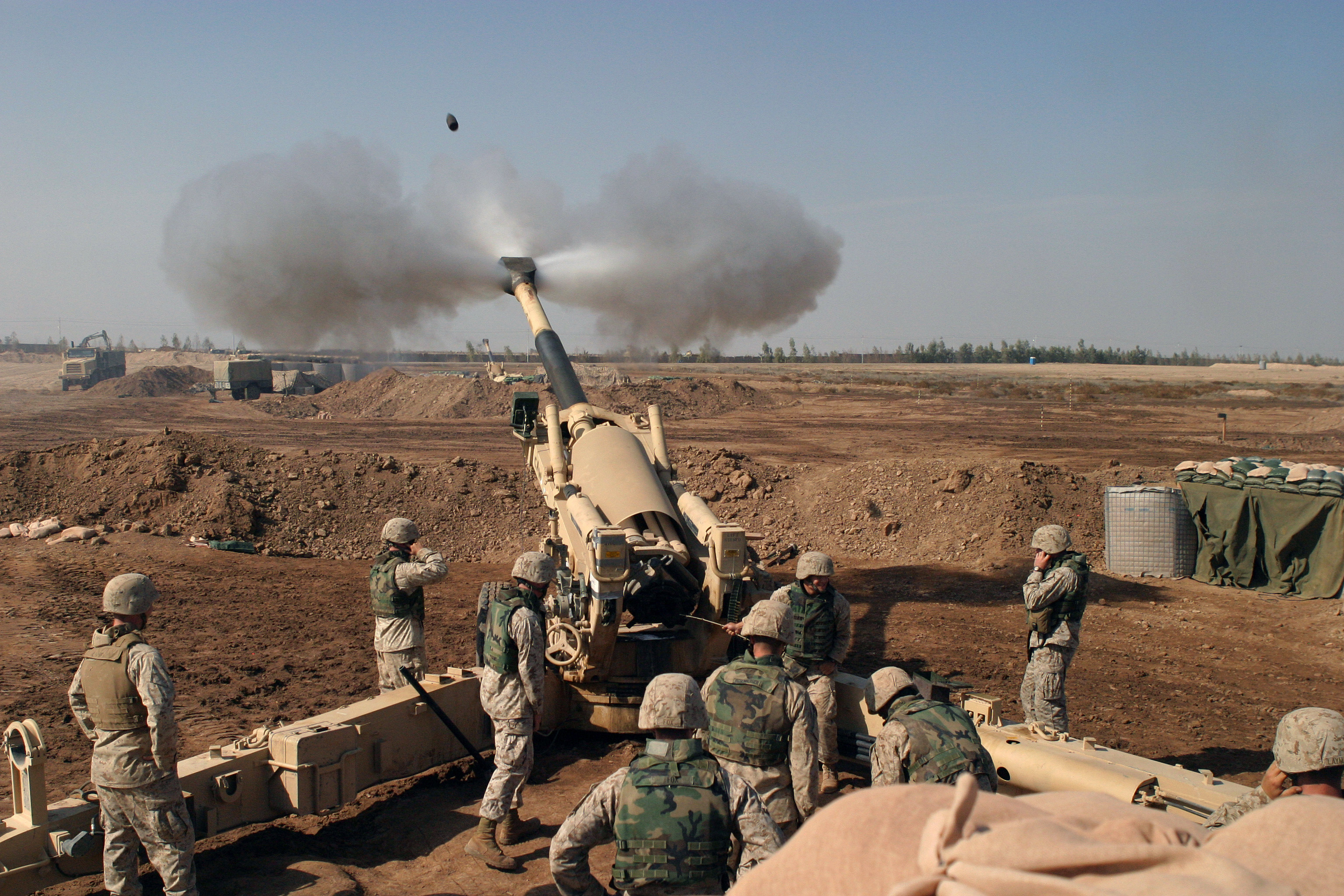
Battery M, 4th Battalion 14th Marines at Camp Fallujah, Iraq.

4th Battalion, 14th Marines started as a direct support artillery battalion utilizing the M109A3 (SP) Self Propelled Howitzer, then transferred all 18 M109A3SP's to the Army and converted to the M198 towed howitzer. The battalion was the last Marine Corps unit to use the M109A3 SP Howitzer.

Headquarters Battery and Lima Battery, both based in Bessemer, AL, were disbanded about 2007. Concurrent with this was the formation of the 4th Anti-Terrorism Battalion, an infantry unit, headquartered in Bessemer. Kilo Battery was reassigned as a HIMARS Battery and reassigned to 2nd Battalion 14th Marines. Mike Battery was reassigned to 3rd Battalion 14th Marines, and has since transitioned to the M-198's replacement, the M-777 lightweight 155mm howitzer. Mike Battery was activated again in 2007 for a 2008 deployment to Iraq.

== See also ==
- List of United States Marine Corps battalions
- Organization of the United States Marine Corps
