= Shahrak-e Fajr, Fars =

Shahrak-e Fajr شهرك فجر
- Village
- Interactive map of Shahrak-e Fajr
- Coordinates: 28°48′00″N 54°14′39″E
- Country: Iran
- Province: Fars
- County: Darab
- Bakhsh: Central
- Rural District: Fasarud

Population (2006)
  - Total: 1,532
- Time zone: UTC+3:30 (IRST)
  - Summer (DST): UTC+4:30 (IRDT)

Shahrak-e Fajr (Persian: شهرك فجر) is a village in Fasarud Rural District, in the Central District of Darab County, Fars province, Iran. At the 2006 census, its population was 1,532, in 366 families.
