= Shahrak-e Fajr, Khuzestan =

Shahrak-e Fajr شهرك فجر
- Village
- Location within Iran
- Coordinates: 31°01′43″N 49°45′38″E
- Country: Iran
- Province: Khuzestan
- County: Ramhormoz
- Bakhsh: Central
- Rural District: Soltanabad

Population (2006)
  - Total: 140
- Time zone: UTC+3:30 (IRST)
  - Summer (DST): UTC+4:30 (IRDT)

Shahrak-e Fajr (Persian: شهرك فجر) is a village in Soltanabad Rural District, in the Central District of Ramhormoz County, Khuzestan Province, Iran. At the 2006 census, its population was 140, in 25 families.
