= Al-Fajr (1934–35 magazine) =

Egyptian magazine

al-Faǧr
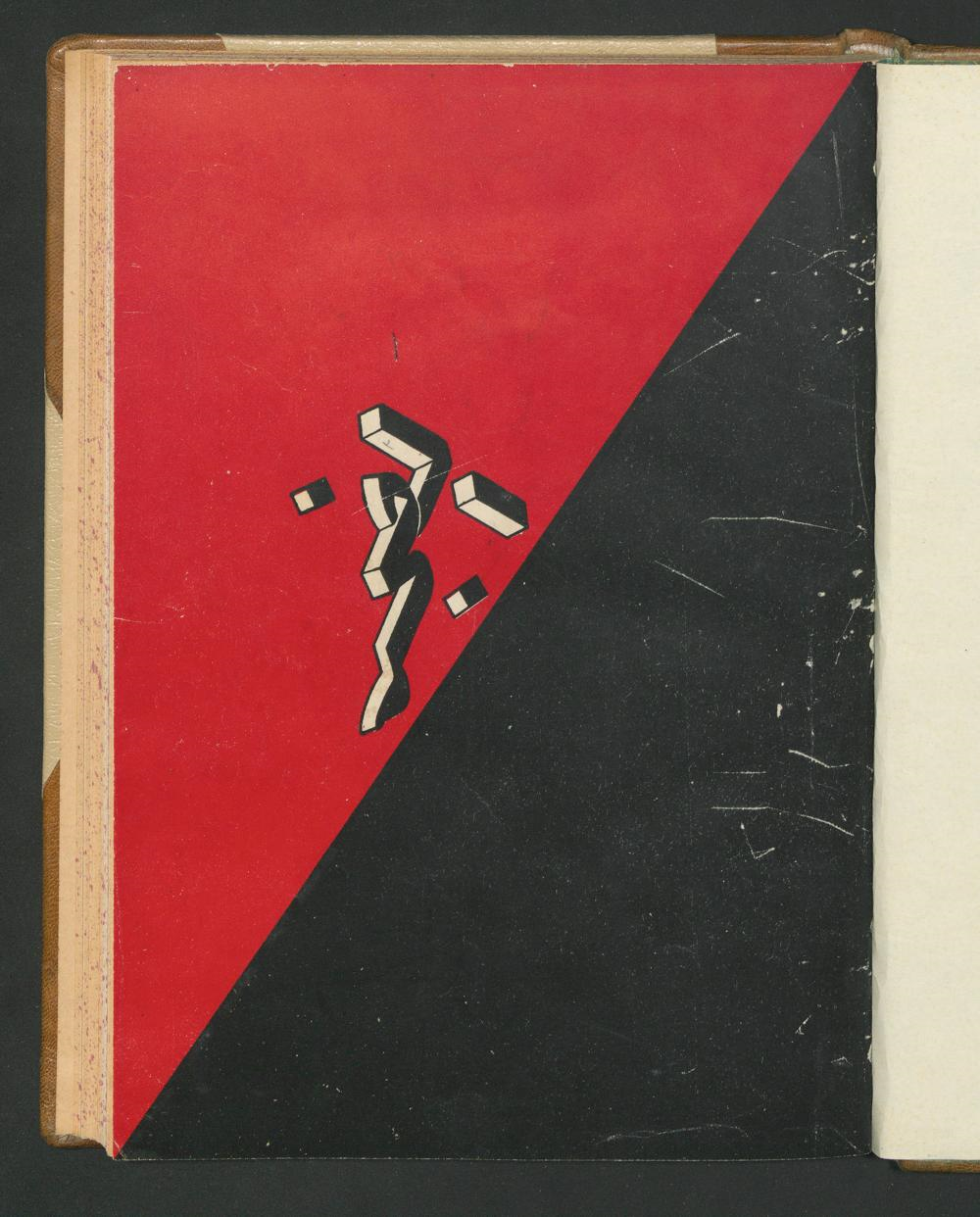
- Editor: Hassan Dhu-l-Fiqar
- Categories: Literature
- Frequency: twice monthly
- Founded: 1934
- Final issue: 1935
- Country: Egypt
- Based in: Cairo
- Language: Arabic
- Website: al-Faǧr

The Egyptian literary magazine al-Fajr (Arabic: الفجر; DMG: al-Faǧr; English: The Dawn) was published twice monthly in Cairo between 1934 and 1935. Two volumes with a total of 18 issues were edited.
