= Shahrak-e Fajr, Ilam =

Shahrak-e Fajr شهرك فجر
- Village
- Location within Iran
- Coordinates: 32°21′28″N 47°54′29″E
- Country: Iran
- Province: Ilam
- County: Dehloran
- Bakhsh: Musian
- Rural District: Dasht-e Abbas

Population (2006)
  - Total: 365
- Time zone: UTC+3:30 (IRST)
  - Summer (DST): UTC+4:30 (IRDT)

Shahrak-e Fajr (Persian: شهرك فجر; also known as Fajr) is a village in Dasht-e Abbas Rural District, Musian District, Dehloran County, Ilam Province, Iran. At the 2006 census, its population was 365, in 61 families. The village is populated by Arabs.
