= 4th Tank Battalion (United States) =

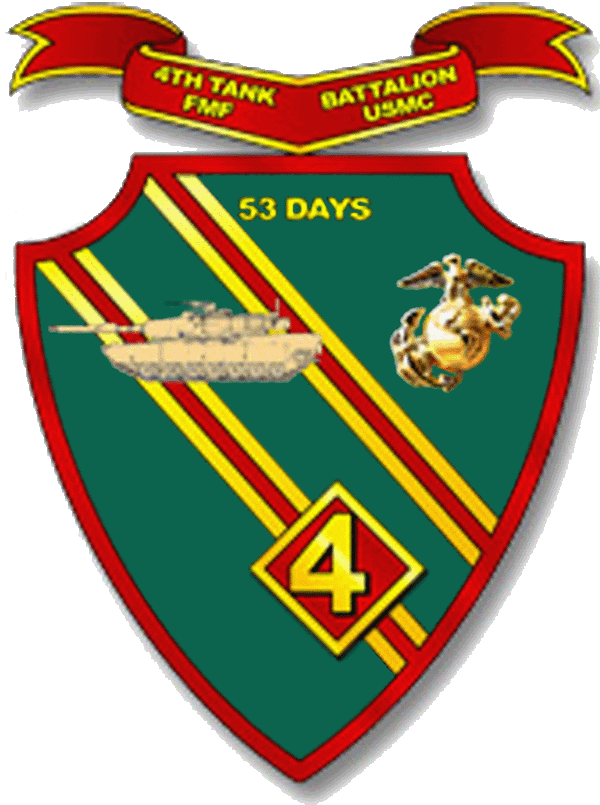
- 4th Tanks Insignia
- Active: May 12, 1943–August 2, 2020
- Country: United States
- Branch: United States Marine Corps
- Type: Armor
- Role: Armor protected firepower and shock action
- Size: Battalion
- Part of: 4th Marine Division; Marine Forces Reserve
- Garrison/HQ: Navy and Marine Corps Reserve Center, San Diego California
- Motto: "53 Days"
- Engagements: World War II; Battle of Kwajalein; Battle of Saipan; Battle of Tinian; Battle of Iwo Jima; Korean War; Battle of Inchon; Battle of Chosin Reservoir; Operation Desert Storm; Battle of Kuwait International Airport; War on terror; Operation Iraqi Freedom; Operation Enduring Freedom

Commanders
- Current commander: Lt Col O'Quin

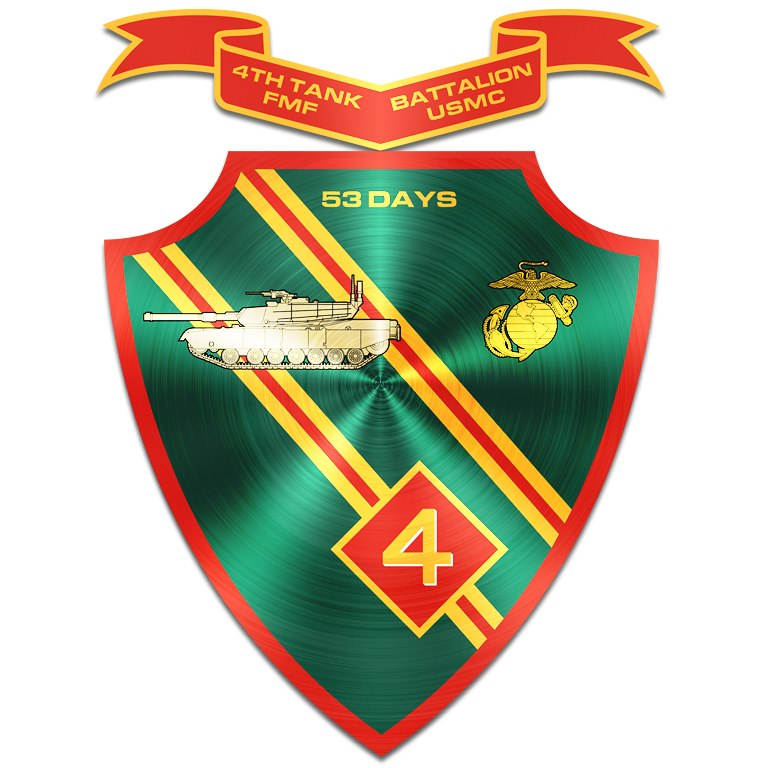
4th Tank Battalion logo

4th Tank Battalion (4th Tanks) was an armored battalion of the United States Marine Corps Reserve. Their primary weapon system was the M1A1 Abrams main battle tank and they were part of the 4th Marine Division and Marine Forces Reserve. The unit headquarters was at the Navy and Marine Corps Reserve Center San Diego, California, but other units in the battalion were located throughout the United States. Until the decision to divest the Marine Corps' armor capability, 4th Tank Battalion was the largest tank battalion in the US military with six lettered companies and an H&S Company.

== Insignia ==
The coat of arms of the 4th Tank Battalion consists of a green jousting shield bordered gold with two bendlets of gold each bearing a riband of scarlet. It is charged with a gold tank icon, initially the M5 Stuart and later the M1A1 Abrams, behind the insignia of the Fourth Marine Division with a U.S. Marine Corps emblem of silver and gold in the shields upper left. The crest of a U.S. Marine Corps emblem of silver and gold above a wreath (or heraldic torse) of gold and scarlet is above the shield. A gold banner inscribed "Fourth Tank Bn" appears above the arms and another below the arms inscribed "53 Days" in scarlet.

The jousting shield is a unique device of the mounted and armored warrior, designed with its upper corners cut away so the warrior could better wield his weapons. Green is the color of armor, while scarlet and gold are the colors of the Marine Corps. The bendlets and ribands are diminutives of the heraldic bend, which is the symbol of cavalry, from which tank battalions descend. The M5 Stuart tank was the first tank used by the battalion in combat, and the battalion was the only Marine tank battalion to use the M5 Stuart tank in offensive operations. (However, Marine defense battalions did use it.) The motto of "53 Days" recalls the battalion being deployed into combat during the Korean conflict's Inchon landings in September 1950, fifty-three days after activation from reserve status.

This coat of arms is derived from designs found in Marine Corps files from at least the 1970s. Variations of this design exist, typically substituting the "tank-de-jour" for the original M5 tank. In October 1995, this version of the coat of arms (with M5 Stuart tank) received official endorsement from the Battalion Commander, Lt.Col. Darryl Stanley, and Executive Officer, Maj. Michael Santa Anna, as it best memorialized the history of the battalion.

(From "U.S. Marine Corps Ground Unit Insignia.")

== Mission ==
To provide armored combat power for the 4th Marine Division in the amphibious assault and subsequent operations ashore utilizing maneuver, armor protected firepower and shock effect to close with and destroy the enemy.

The battalion was also tasked to organize, train, and equip individual Marines and combat ready tank companies to augment and reinforce the active duty component when required to serve as part of the Total Force of the United States. 4th Tank Battalion was a self-sustaining, autonomous unit capable of performing all the tasks of the regular force.

== Subordinate units ==
Name	Location
Headquarters and Services Company	San Diego, California
Alpha Company	Camp Pendleton, California
Bravo Company	Yakima, Washington
Charlie Company	Boise, Idaho
Delta Company	29 Palms, California
Echo Company	Fort Knox, Kentucky
Fox Company	Camp Lejeune, North Carolina
TOW/Scout Platoon	Amarillo, Texas

== History ==
=== World War II ===
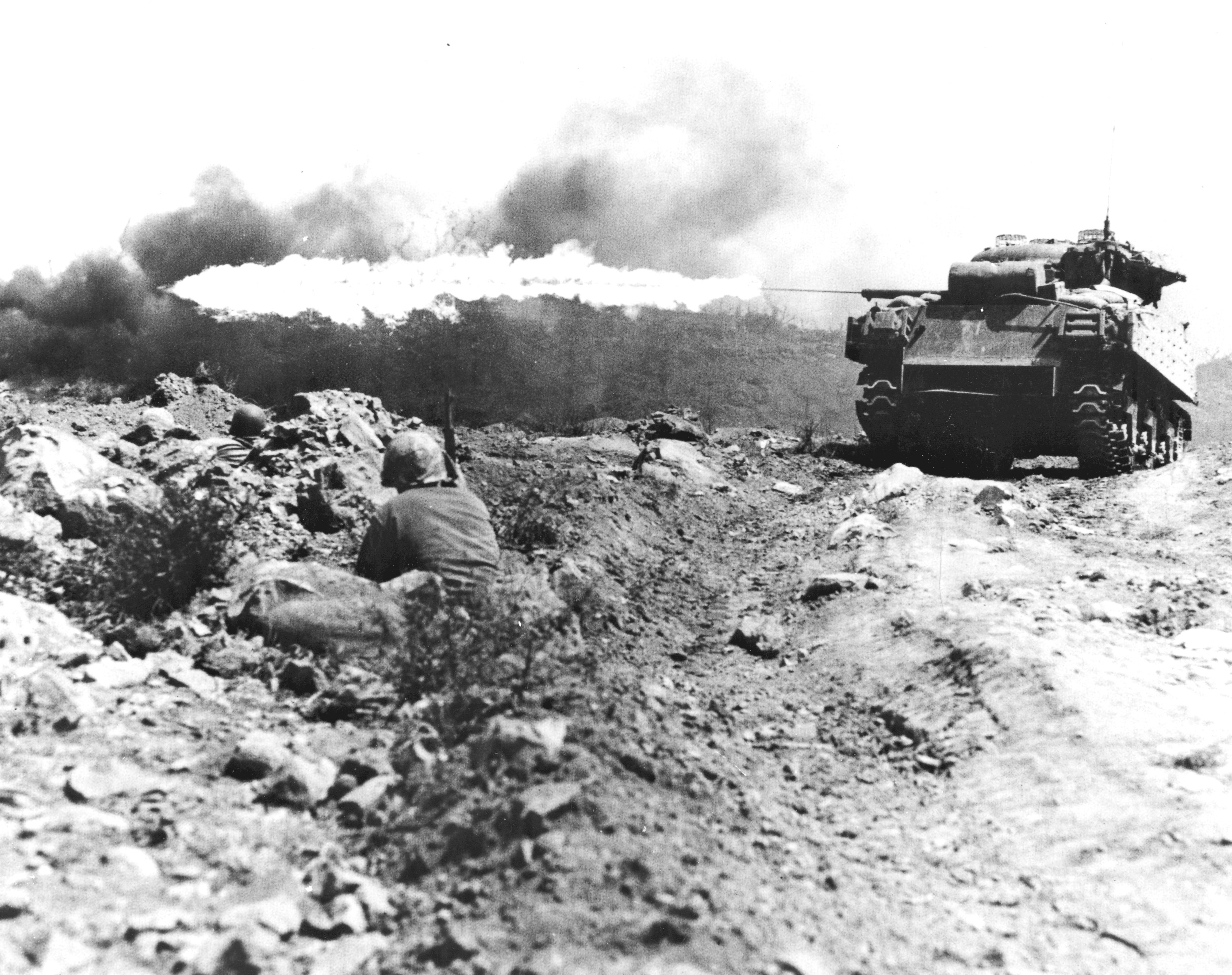
The CB-H1-H2 flamethrower seen here on Iwo Jima had a range of 150 yards

The battalion was first formed on May 12, 1943, at Marine Corps Base Camp Pendleton, California. It was composed, with the exception of two officers, entirely of reservists. It was the first unit to capture Japanese mandated territory in the Pacific. It participated in the Battle of Kwajalein, Battle of Saipan, Battle of Tinian, and the Battle of Iwo Jima. For Iwo Jima the unit was augmented with four M4A3 Shermans that had the main armament swapped for a Seabee CB-H1-H2 flamethrower. As the troops became aware of the weapon they had they would hold up their assault and wait for the tankers with their CB-H2s. Ground commanders felt it was the single best weapons system at their disposal. On Iwo the tank battalions from all three Divisions were formed into a Regimental command led by Lt. Colonel William R. Collins of the 5th. It was the largest USMC armor command of the war.

- The 4th Tank Battalion received a Presidential Unit Citation.

Late in 1946, a group of World War II veterans began meeting at the Marine Corps Recruit Depot on a volunteer basis. This became the formation of the first organized Marine Corps Reserve unit in San Diego. The unit was officially designated as the 11th Tank Battalion in 1947 and became home for a headquarters and a tank company.

=== Korean War ===
In July, 1950, the unit was activated for the Korean War. Those members with sufficient experience as tankers formed the nucleus of B Company, 1st Tank Battalion, at Camp Pendleton. The 4th Tank Battalion motto is "53 days." When Marine reservists were activated for the Korean War, it was just 53 days until they participated in their first combat action, the landing at Inchon in September 1950. San Diego reservists served with this unit, participating in the landings at Inchon and Wonsan, fighting to Hagaru-Ri and Koto-Ri. B Company remained in Korea until the armistice.

In May 1952, the unit was reactivated in San Diego, now bearing the name 1st Tank Battalion, and headquartered at MCRD. In 1958, the battalion was transferred to Camp Elliot as a more appropriate location for tank operations. In July 1963, the battalion was redesignated as 4th Tank Battalion, Force Troops, Fleet Marine Force, USMCR.

=== The 1960s through to the 1990s ===
Between November 1990 and January 1991, 4th Tank Battalion was mobilized in support of Operation Desert Shield and Operation Desert Storm. Elements of the battalion were "in country" and combat ready within 32 days of activation. During the fighting, Bravo Company engaged Iraqi tanks in combat on February 25, reporting 34 enemy tanks destroyed or disabled in less than 90 seconds. This battle was named the “Reveille Engagement” and went on to be the biggest and fastest tank battle in United States Marine Corps history. They were one of two companies from 4th Tank Battalion equipped with M1A1 Abrams tanks (Co “C” 4th Tank Bn was the other). Bravo company went on to destroy 59 tanks, 32 APCs, 26 non armored vehicles, and an artillery gun. Bravo Company destroyed a total of 119 enemy vehicles and took over 800 POWs. Tank crew “Stepchild” has the longest confirmed live kill (Iraqi BMP) by a tank at 3,750 meters (2.33miles).

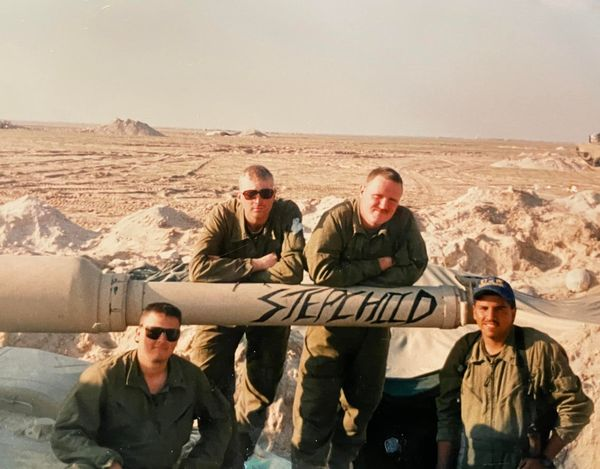
Marines of the tank Stepchild, longest combat tank shot 3,750 meters.

=== Global war on terror ===
During Operation Iraqi Freedom portions of the battalion were activated and deployed to Iraq, and to Afghanistan during Operation Enduring Freedom. Most recently, the Marines of Echo Company, based out of Ft. Knox, deployed to Afghanistan to conduct route clearance missions throughout Helmand Province from April 2012 to October 2012. Echo Company was attached to the 1st Combat Engineer Battalion based out of Camp Pendleton, California.

== See also ==
- List of United States Marine Corps battalions
- Organization of the United States Marine Corps
