= Special Purpose Marine Air-Ground Task Force – Crisis Response – Africa =

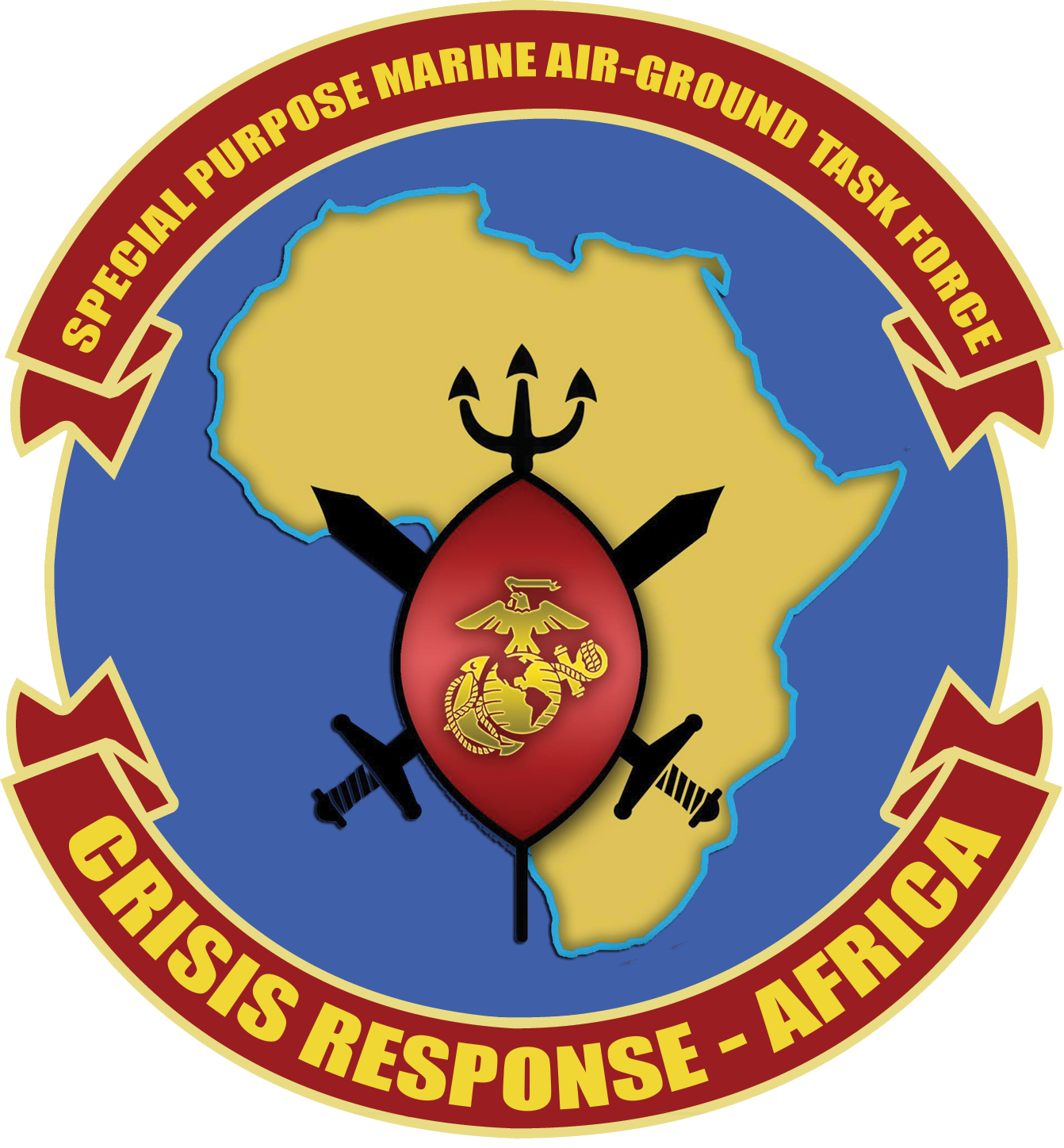
- The SPMAGTF-CR-AF official seal (Note: The seal borrows symbolism from the U.S. AFRICOM seal along with U.S. Marine Corps specific themes. The continent of Africa represents the unit's primary area of responsibility. The scarlet and gold shield is emblazoned with the Marine Corps emblem and represents defense. The upturned swords represent the theme of "ready to fight" and the trident symbolizes the Marine Corps' maritime traditions and capabilities. There is also a light blue border, representing the U.S. Dept. of State, around the continent of Africa which harks to the unit's mission of protecting U.S. embassies and other partnered interests in the region.)
- Active: 21 April 2013 – 2021
- Country: United States
- Branch: United States Marine Corps (USMC)
- Type: Marine Air-Ground Task Force
- Role: Forward-deployed, rapid-response force
- Size: 850
- Part of: United States Marine Forces Europe and Africa

Commanders
- Current commander: Colonel Thomas J. Dodds

Special Purpose Marine Air-Ground Task Force – Crisis Response – Africa (SP-MAGTF-CR-AF) was a Marine Air-Ground Task Force that was permanently based at Morón Air Base in Spain. SP-MAGTF-CR-AF reported to U.S. Marine Corps Forces Africa under United States Africa Command. It was a self-mobile, self-sustaining force of approximately 850 Marines and sailors, capable of responding to a range of crises. The unit was specifically trained to support U.S. and partner interests throughout the United States Africa Command area of responsibility, to include embassy reinforcement, support to noncombatant evacuation operations, tactical recovery of aircraft and personnel, humanitarian assistance, and disaster relief. The unit also took part in bilateral and multilateral training exercises with regional partners. It was commanded by a U.S. Marine colonel (O-6).

== History ==
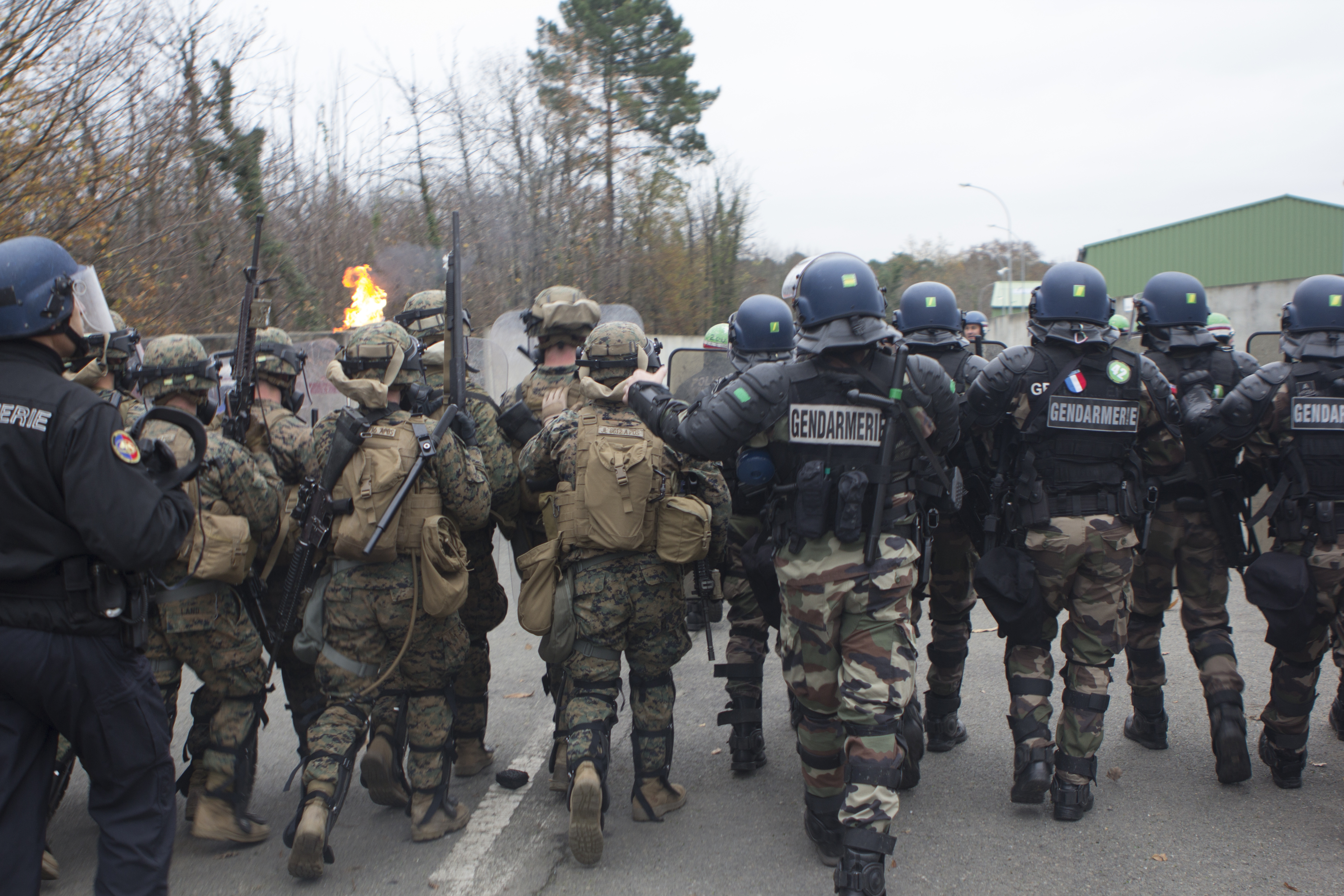
U.S. Marines with SPMAGTF Crisis Response – Africa and French gendarmes with Mobile Gendarmeries Armored Group work together to control a mock riot caused by role-players, while training in crowd and riot control techniques at the National Gendarmerie Training Center in St. Astier, France, Dec. 2, 2014.

In 2011, based on strategic insight, LtCol. Thomas Atkinson, Strategic Plans Officer for USMARFORAF, created SPMAGTF-AF with funding from USAFRICOM and USMARFORCOM. The SPMAGTF-AF initially consisted of 120 specially trained Marines from 4th Force Reconnaissance Co. and ACE support. The TE included two KC-130 aircraft vehicles and trucks. SPMAGTF-12 (see external link below), the first rotation was trained in Limited Crisis Response, Humanitarian Aid, and Host Nation Support in Africa. SPMAGTF Marines were trained in embassy reinforcement and stationed out of NAS Sigonella, Sicily, for timely response in Africa. In 2012, the highly successful SPMAGTF was replicated in every COCOM globally.

In 2013, following the 2012 Benghazi attack, Lt. Gen. Richard T. Tryon, Marine Corps deputy commandant for plans, policies and operations, announced the creation of a larger Special Purpose Marine Air Ground Task Force that could fly in a company of Marines on Bell Boeing MV-22B Ospreys to respond to crises in Africa. However, this will require political work to secure a ground base nearby that the amphibious ships operating in the global commons of the world's oceans do not require. The task force self-deployed to Morón Air Base on 27 April 2013.

USMC spokesman Capt. Eric Flanagan has listed the responsibilities of the task force to be a first responder for American embassies in the area, to help evacuate Americans, and to provide humanitarian and disaster relief.

In June, elements of the unit went to Italy during the 100th anniversary of Italian naval aviation where they showcased the U.S. Marine Corps' MV-22B Osprey.

In July 2013, Col. Scott F. Benedict, the commander of the 24th Marine Expeditionary Unit, took over command of SP-MAGTF Crisis Response and brought much of his staff from the 24th MEU. As of July, SP-MAGTF Crisis Response consisted of a Command Element from the 24th MEU, a Ground Combat Element (GCE) from Bravo Company, 2nd Reconnaissance Battalion, based out of Camp Lejeune, N.C.; an Aviation Combat Element (ACE) from Marine Medium Tiltrotor Squadron 365 (VMM-365) out of New River, N.C.; and a small Logistics Combat Element (LCE) from the 2nd Marine Logistics Group, also from Camp Lejeune.

One of the primary objectives of the new commander was to establish relationships among American and foreign military and civilian leaders within Spain and the surrounding area. To this end, the unit conducted a bilateral exercise from July 29 to Aug. 1, when infantry Marines trained alongside Spanish paratroopers from the Brigada de Infantería Ligera Paracaidista at the Principe Training Camp near Uceda, Spain. Later that month, there was another bilateral event as the GCE again joined Spanish paratroopers and U.S. Sailors for a free-fall training exercise near Naval Station Rota Spain, August 12–16.

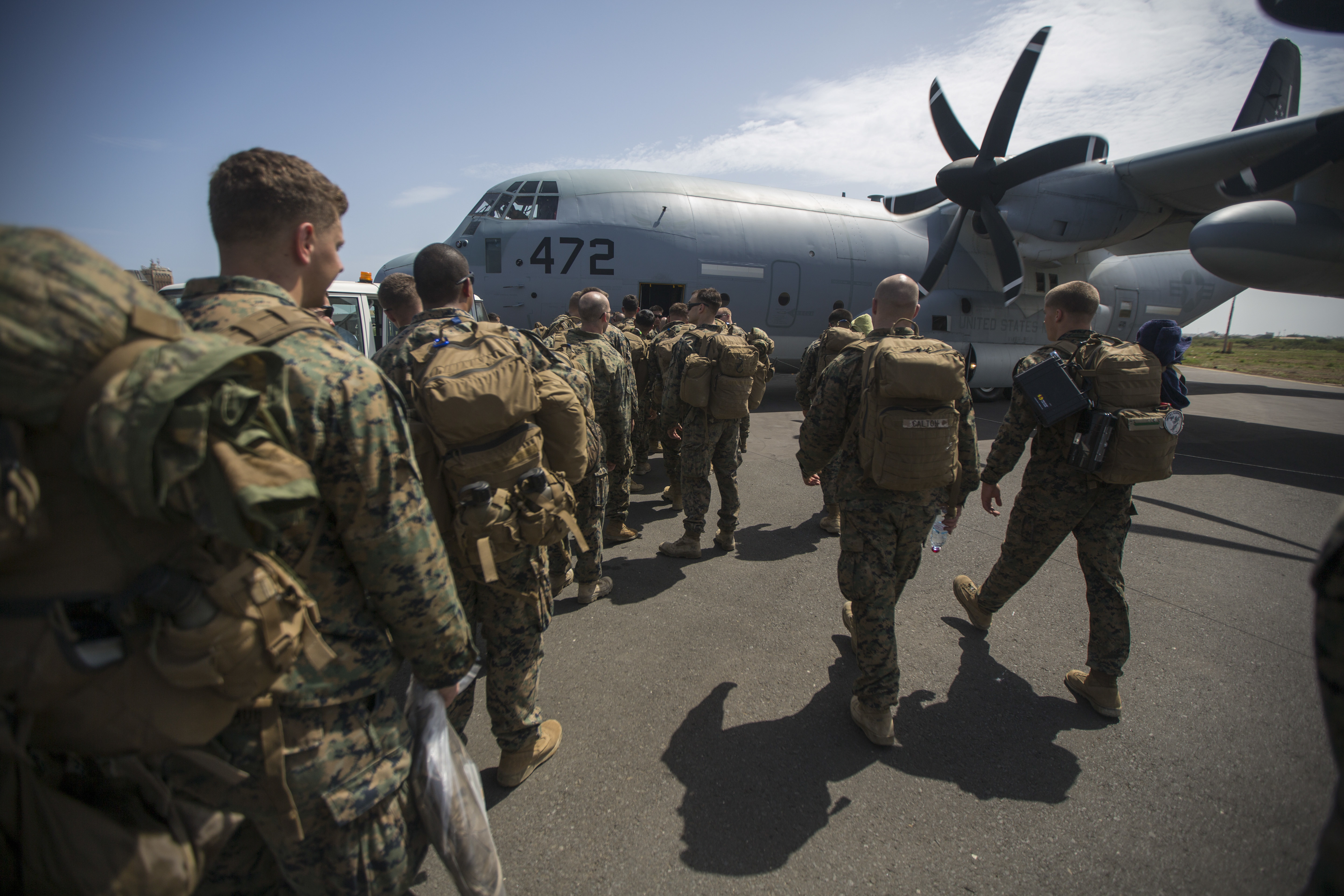
Marines and Sailors with SPMAGTF Crisis Response – Africa board a KC-130J Super Hercules to travel to Liberia from Dakar, Senegal, to support Operation United Assistance, Oct. 9, 2014.

Between August and September, the unit saw its aviation and infantry units conduct turnovers as VMM-162 replaced VMM-365 as the ACE, and Alpha Company replaced Bravo Company (both from 2nd Reconnaissance Battalion) as the GCE. Shortly after, on Sept. 25, the U.S. Ambassador to Spain, Mr. James Costos, visited Moròn and received a brief regarding the capabilities of the force and a ride in an Osprey.

From Oct. 28 to Nov. 1, SP-MAGTF Crisis Response Marines flew north to Camp des Garrigues near Nîmes, France, to take part in a bilateral training event with French Legionnaires with the 2nd Foreign Infantry Regiment. The five-day event aimed at developing a working relationship with the French military and was the first event between SP-MAGTF Crisis Response and the French. The training was also historically significant because it was the first time an MV-22B Osprey landed and operated in a tactical environment on French soil. The Osprey had only been in France once before, at the 1995 Paris Air Show in Le Bourget.

Another significant event in November was the insert of personnel to Dakar, Senegal, Nov. 13. The mission consisted of the movement of a contingent of Marines from SP-MAGTF Africa using SP-MAGTF Crisis Response Ospreys and a KC-130J Hercules. The movement was over 1,500 nautical miles and marked the first time Osprey aircraft landed in West Africa. There was a static display and demonstration flight for those in attendance, which included the U.S. Ambassador to Senegal, Mr. Lewis Lukens, and senior members of the Senegalese military.

In January 2014 the SPMAGTF-CR operated out of Entebbe, Uganda to evacuate American staff in response to the South Sudan conflict.

In March 2014, Spain agreed to an expansion to 850 marines and an extension of the mission for another year.

In April 2014, Commandant Amos said that the USMC was to attempt to move the unit down to the Gulf of Guinea over the next two years.

In May 2014, a 200 Marine detachment was again sent to Sigonella in response to "a deteriorating security situation in North Africa".

In October 2014, Marines and Sailors with SPMAGTF Crisis Response Africa traveled to Liberia from Dakar, Senegal, to support OPERATION UNITED ASSISTANCE. The operation is part of a comprehensive U.S. Government effort, led by the U.S. Agency for International Development, to respond to and contain the outbreak of the Ebola virus in West Africa as quickly as possible.

In 2015 the United States and Spain agreed on a permanent agreement for use of the base to replace the year-to-year terms the task force had been operating under.

In July 2015, SPMAGTF-CR-AF 15.2 took authority for operations under the command of Col Cal L. Worth Jr. of the 6th Marine Regiment, 2d Marine Division. Col Worth's regiment staff composes the body of the CE. The ACE is Marine Medium Tiltrotor Squadron 261 (VMM-261), 2d Marine Air Wing; the GCE is the 3d Battalion, 8th Marine Regiment, 2d Marine Division; and the LCE is Combat Logistics Battalion-6, 2d Marine Logistics Group. All units are from the II Marine Expeditionary Force based aboard Marine Corps Base Camp Lejeune, North Carolina.

In September 2015 SPMAGTF-CR-AF will deploy aboard various allied ships in Exercise Trident Juncture.

In 2017 half of the unit's V-22s will be taken away for training.

In 2021 the mission was shifted over to the US Army.

== Assets ==
- 13.1 (April 2013 – unknown)
  - CE - 24th Marine Expeditionary Unit
  - GCE - Bravo Company, 2nd Reconnaissance Battalion (replaced by Alpha Company, 2nd Recon Battalion during August 2013)
  - LCE - Elements of 2nd Marine Logistics Group
  - ACE - VMM-365 YM – MV-22B Osprey (replaced by VMM-162 YS during August 2013)
- 14.1
  - CE -
  - GCE - 3rd Battalion, 8th Marines
  - LCE -
  - ACE -VMM-162 YS – MV-22B Osprey
- 14.2
  - CE -
  - GCE -
  - LCE - Combat Logistics Battalion 2
  - ACE -
- 15.1
  - CE -
  - GCE - 2nd Battalion, 8th Marines
  - LCE - Marine Wing Support Squadron 272
  - ACE -
- 15.2 (July 2015 – unknown)
  - CE -
  - GCE - 3rd Battalion, 8th Marines
  - LCE - Combat Logistics Battalion 6, 2nd Marine Logistics Group
  - ACE - VMM-261 EM – MV-22B Osprey.
    - Took part in Exercises Blue Raptor (Corsica) and Trident Juncture (Europe)
- During February 2016.
  - CE -
  - GCE - B Company, 1st Battalion, 8th Marines
  - LCE - Combat Logistics Battalion 2
  - ACE
    - VMM-263 EG – MV-22B Osprey.
    - VMGR-252 BH – KC-130J.
- During October 2016
  - CE -
  - GCE -
  - LCE -
  - ACE - VMM-266 ES - MV-22B Osprey
- 18.1 (October 2017 - March 2018)
  - CE - 22nd Marine Expeditionary Unit
  - GCE - F & G Company, 2nd Battalion, 2nd Marines
  - LCE - Combat Logistics Battalion 6
  - ACE
    - VMM-261 EM - MV-22B Osprey
    - VMGR-252 BH – KC-130J
- 18.2
  - CE - Combat Logistics Regiment 2
  - GCE - A Company, 1st Battalion, 6th Marines
  - LCE - Combat Logistics Battalion 2
  - ACE - VMM-263 EG - MV-22B Osprey
- 19.2
  - CE - 24th Marine Expeditionary Unit
  - GCE - 1st Battalion, 8th Marines
  - LCE - Combat Logistics Battalion 24
  - ACE - VMM-261 EM - MV-22B Osprey
- 20.1 (September 2019 - )
  - CE - Combat Logistics Regiment 25
  - GCE - E Company, 2nd Battalion, 6th Marines
  - LCE - Combat Logistics Battalion 6
  - ACE
    - VMM-774 MQ - MV-22B Osprey
    - VMGR-252 BH – KC-130J
- 20.2
  - CE - 22nd Marine Expeditionary Unit
  - GCE - I Company, 3rd Battalion, 2nd Marines
  - LCE - Combat Logistics Battalion 22
  - ACE - VMM-263 EG - MV-22B Osprey
- 21.1 (transition of mission to Northwest Africa Response Force (NARF))
  - CE - U.S. Army Southern European Task Force, Africa (SETAF-AF) took over the North and West Africa crisis response force mission from the Special Purpose Marine Air Ground Task Force-Crisis Response-Africa in Oct. 2020. NARF is under SETAF-AF. The Marine ACE is providing support for NARF.
  - GCE - transition of mission to 173rd Airborne Brigade (USAREUR)
  - LCE -
  - ACE - VMM-263 EG - MV-22B Osprey

== Other units ==
The USMC has considered setting up two additional such units. One based in the United States for United States Marine Corps Forces, South, and another in Bahrain for United States Marine Forces Central Command. However the Congress is considered unlikely to vote for the Opportunity, Growth, and Security Initiative funding needed. The United States House Committee on Armed Services voted to transfer the needed funds from operations and maintenance accounts instead, risking a hollow force.

In 2014 SP-MAGTF Central Command deployed a two thousand Marine force to the Persian Gulf with their aircraft. SP-MAGTF-CR-CC will remain on call for recovery of downed allied pilots conducting airstrikes during Operation Inherent Resolve.

In June 2015 the 250 Marines of Special Purpose Marine Air-Ground Task Force-South are scheduled to deploy to four Central American countries.

== See also ==
- Special Purpose Marine Air-Ground Task Force – Crisis Response – Central Command
- Marine Air-Ground Task Force
- List of Marine Expeditionary Units
- Organization of the United States Marine Corps
- 24th Marine Expeditionary Unit
