= General Mason =

General Mason may refer to:

- Arthur T. Mason (1902–1980), U.S. Marine Corps brigadier general
- Guillermo Suárez Mason (1924–2005), Argentine general
- James Mason (Canadian politician) (1843–1918), Canadian-born British Army brigadier general
- John Mason (planter) (1766–1849), District of Columbia militia brigadier general
- John S. Mason (1824–1897), Union Army brigadier general
- Richard Barnes Mason (1797–1850), U.S. Army brevet brigadier general
- Samson Mason (1793–1869), Ohio State Militia major general

== See also ==
- Noel Mason-MacFarlane (1889–1953), British Army lieutenant general
- Attorney General Mason (disambiguation)
