= Attorney General Mason =

Attorney General Mason may refer to:

- Jeremiah Mason (1768–1848), Attorney General of New Hampshire
- John Thomson Mason (1765–1824), Attorney General of Maryland
- John Y. Mason (1799–1859), Attorney General of the United States
- Rex Mason (1885–1975), Attorney-General of New Zealand

== See also ==
- General Mason (disambiguation)
