= John A. Toolan =

United States Marine Corps general

John Toolan
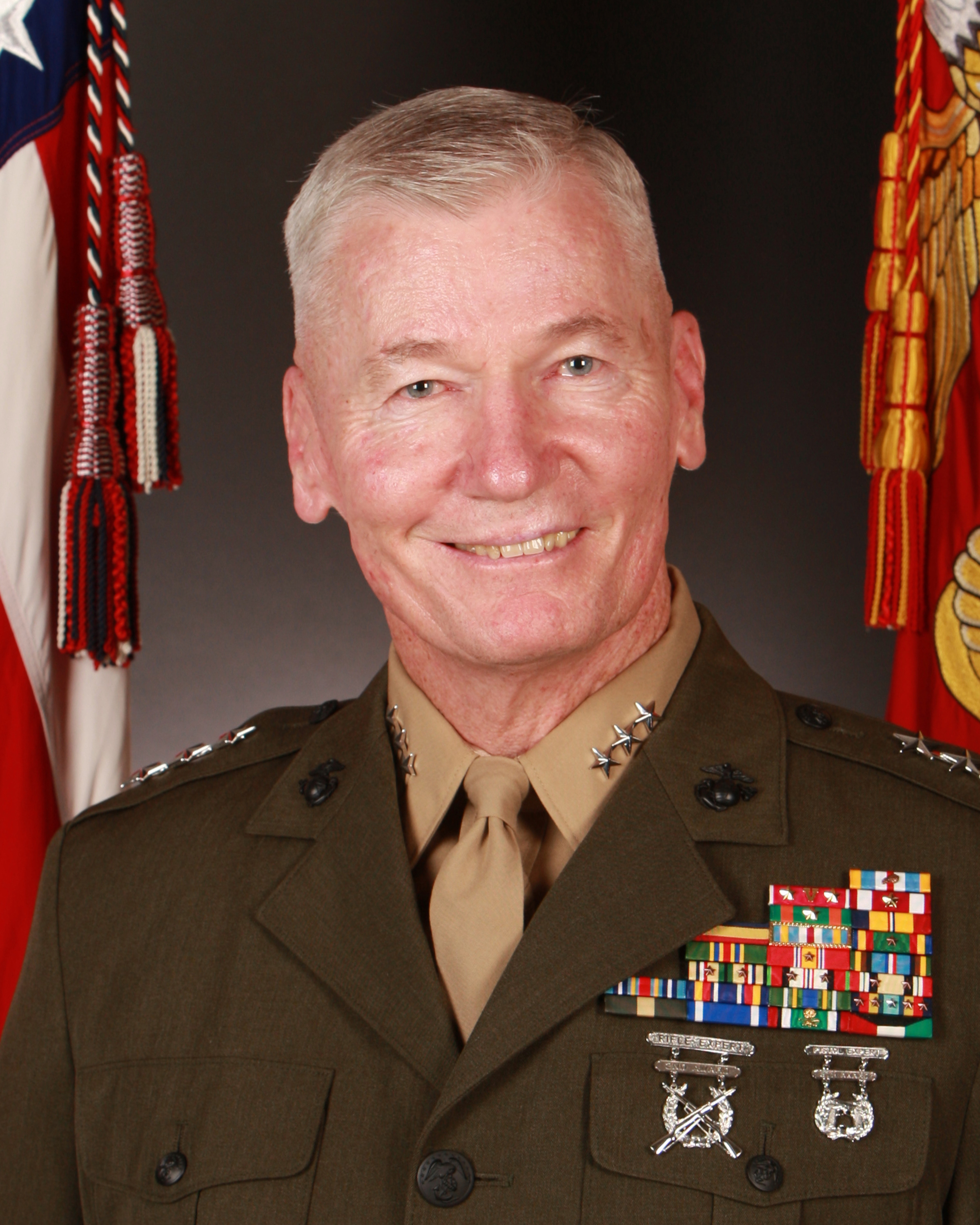
- Born: January 28, 1954 (age 72); Brooklyn, New York, U.S.
- Military career
- Allegiance: United States
- Branch: United States Marine Corps
- Service years: 1976–2016
- Rank: Lieutenant General
- Commands: United States Marine Corps Forces, Pacific; II MEF (FWD) / Regional Command Southwest; 2D Marine Division; Regimental Combat Team 1; 1st Marines; 3rd Light Armored Reconnaissance Battalion
- Conflicts: Gulf War; Iraq War; War in Afghanistan
- Awards: Defense Superior Service Medal (2); Legion of Merit with Valor (3)

John "Jocko" A. Toolan Jr. (born January 28, 1954) is a retired United States Marine Corps Lieutenant General, whose final post was as the Commanding General, United States Marine Corps Forces, Pacific.

== Marine Corps career ==
Toolan joined the United States Marine Corps in 1976, and graduated from the Basic School in April 1977. His first assignment was with the 1st Battalion, 9th Marines in Okinawa, Japan. After three years service at Marine Corps Recruit Depot San Diego, he served as company commander of Golf Company, 2nd Battalion, 7th Marines from 1982 to 1984.

Toolan saw service in the Gulf War in 1991 before taking command of the 3rd Light Armored Reconnaissance Battalion at Marine Corps Air Ground Combat Center Twentynine Palms, California. He also served on the Supreme Allied Headquarters in Europe.

In 2003, Toolan served as the Chief of Staff for 1st Marine Division during the march to Baghdad as part of the Iraq War, serving under Major General James Mattis. In 2004, he commanded 1st Marine Regiment during the First Battle of Fallujah.

From March 2011 to March 2012, Toolan commanded Regional Command Southwest during the War in Afghanistan.

He also served as Director of Command and Staff College at Marine Corps Base Quantico, Virginia, and, in September 2012, he took command of I Marine Expeditionary Force. Toolan retired from the Marine Corps on October 1, 2016.

== Awards, honors and decorations ==

First row	Defense Superior Service Medal w/ 1 oak leaf cluster	Legion of Merit w/ valor device & 2 award stars	Meritorious Service Medal w/ 1 award star	Navy and Marine Corps Achievement Medal w/ 1 award star
Second row	Combat Action Ribbon	Presidential Unit Citation	Joint Meritorious Unit Award w/ 1 oak leaf cluster	Navy Unit Commendation w/ 2 service stars
Third row	Navy and Marine Corps Meritorious Unit Commendation	National Defense Service Medal w/ 1 service star	Armed Forces Expeditionary Medal	Southwest Asia Service Medal w/ 2 service stars
Fourth row	Kosovo Campaign Medal w/ 1 service star	Afghanistan Campaign Medal w/ 1 service star	Iraq Campaign Medal w/ 2 service stars	Global War on Terrorism Expeditionary Medal
Fifth row	Global War on Terrorism Service Medal	Korea Defense Service Medal	Sea Service Ribbon w/ 9 service stars	Overseas Service Ribbon w/ 1 service star
Sixth row	Drill Instructor Ribbon	NATO Medal (Kosovo)	Kuwait Liberation Medal (Saudi Arabia)	Kuwait Liberation Medal (Kuwait)
Badge	Office of the Secretary of Defense Identification Badge			
