= 1st Marine Regiment =

Military unit

- 1st Marine Regiment Insignia
- Active: 27 Nov 1913 – 20 Dec 1916; 25 Jan 1917 – 22 Apr 1922; 1 Aug 1922 – 1 July 1924; 15 March 1925 – 1 Nov 1931; 1 March 1941 – 20 May 1947; 1 Oct 1947 – 1 Oct 1949; 4 Aug 1950 – present
- Country: United States
- Branch: United States Marine Corps
- Type: Infantry regiment
- Part of: 1st Marine Division; I Marine Expeditionary Force
- Garrison/HQ: MCB Camp Pendleton
- Nickname: "Inchon"
- Motto: Ready To Fight
- March: Waltzing Matilda
- Engagements: China Relief Expedition; Banana Wars; Occupation of Haiti; Occupation of the Dominican Republic; World War II; Guadalcanal Campaign; Battle of Cape Gloucester; Battle of Peleliu; Battle of Okinawa; Korean War; Vietnam War; Operation Desert Storm; War on terror; Operation Enduring Freedom; Operation Iraqi Freedom

Commanders
- Current commander: Colonel Jason C. Armas
- Notable commanders: Clifton B. Cates; William J. Whaling; Chesty Puller; Francis M. McAlister; Arthur T. Mason; Ormond R. Simpson; Carl W. Hoffman; Herbert L. Wilkerson; Paul X. Kelley; Clifford L. Stanley; Stanley S. Hughes; John A. Toolan; Daniel J. O'Donohue; Brendan P. Sullivan

The 1st Marine Regiment is an infantry regiment of the United States Marine Corps based at Marine Corps Base Camp Pendleton, California. The regiment is under the command of the 1st Marine Division and the I Marine Expeditionary Force. The 1st Marine Regiment is also sometimes referred to as "Regimental Combat Team 1" or "Inchon".

== Organization ==
The regiment comprises three infantry battalions and one headquarters company:

- Headquarters Company 1st Marines
- 1st Battalion, 1st Marines (1/1)
- 2nd Battalion, 1st Marines (2/1)
- 3rd Battalion, 1st Marines (3/1)

== History ==
The 1st Marines were activated in Philadelphia, Pennsylvania on 27 November 1913. At this time, it bore the designation of 2nd Advanced Base Regiment. During the 1st Marine Regiment's early years, it was primarily employed as a combat force in the so-called Banana Wars, and in the Caribbean area. The first of these engagements occurred in April 1914, when the regiment landed and seized the Mexican port of Vera Cruz.

They next participated in the Haitian campaign (1915–1916) and the Dominican Republic campaign (1916). On 1 July 1916, this organization was re-designated as the 1st Regiment of Marines. In December 1918, the 1st Regiment returned to the Caribbean and was deployed to Cuba for approximately six months.

Following its second Dominican tour of duty, it was deactivated; but it was subsequently reactivated at Quantico, Virginia on 15 March 1925. The Regiment received its present designation of 1st Marines on 10 July 1930. The 1930s was a period of inactivity in the 1st Marines' history, as the unit was in a deactivated status during most of this time. World War II was the occasion for the next reactivation of the Regiment on 1 February 1941 at Culebra, Puerto Rico as part of the 1st Marine Division.

=== World War II ===
The 1st Marines stood at a low state of readiness at the beginning of the war, having just been reconstituted from cadre status; however, the regiment did possess very strong leadership at the higher levels. In June 1942, the 1st Marines set sail from San Francisco on board a mix of eight ships headed for the South Pacific. The 1st Marines landed on the island of Guadalcanal, part of the Solomon Islands, on 7 August 1942, and fought in the Guadalcanal Campaign until relieved on 22 December 1942.

Some of the heaviest action the regiment saw on Guadalcanal took place on 21 August 1942, during the Battle of the Tenaru, which was the first Japanese counter-attack of the campaign. Following their first campaign, the regiment was sent to Melbourne, Australia to rest and refit. During their stay, there they were billeted in the Melbourne Cricket Ground until leaving in September 1943.

The 1st Marines' next action was Operation Cartwheel, which was the codename for the campaigns in Eastern New Guinea and New Britain. The regiment was the first ashore at the Battle of Cape Gloucester on 26 December 1943; and continued fighting on the island, at such places as Suicide Creek and Ajar Ridge, until February 1944.

The 1st Marines next battle was its bloodiest yet – the Battle of Peleliu. The regiment landed on 15 September 1944, as part of the 1st Marine Division's assault on the island. The division's commanding general, Major General William H. Rupertus had predicted the fighting would be, "...tough but short. It'll be over in three of four days – a fight like Tarawa. Rough but fast. Then we can go back to a rest area." During the Battle of Peleliu, the regiment was decimated by heavy artillery and accurate small arms fire in the vicinity of Bloody Nose Ridge. Repeated frontal assaults with fixed bayonets failed to unseat the Japanese defenders from the 14th Division (Imperial Japanese Army). The 1st Marines fought on Peleliu for 10 days before being pulled off the lines after suffering 58% casualties and no longer being combat effective. Ten days of fighting on Peleliu cost the 1st Marine Regiment 1,749 casualties.

The last World War II engagement for the regiment was the Battle of Okinawa under the command of Colonel Arthur T. Mason.

In September 1945, the 1st Marines deployed to North China to take part in the garrisoning of the area and in the repatriation of former enemy personnel. It remained in China until February 1949. It is also likely that they were stationed in North China to bolster the Chinese Nationalists' defense against the Chinese Communists. The presence of the 1st Marines was used as leverage by George C. Marshall in 1945–46 to attempt to moderate a settlement to the impending Chinese Civil War. The regiment returned to Marine Corps Base Camp Pendleton and was deactivated on 1 October 1949.

=== Korean War ===
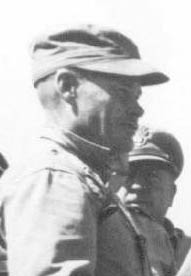
Col. Chesty Puller at Inchon leading 1st Marines

The Korean War prompted an expansion of the Marine Corps. As a result, the regiment was brought back into existence on 4 August 1950. On 15 September, the 1st Marine Division, including the 1st Marines, assaulted the beaches of Inchon.

The regiment then went on to take part in the liberation of Seoul and later in the Chosin Reservoir Campaign. For the next two and one-half years, the 1st Marines continued to engage the North Korean and Chinese Communists. Following the termination of hostilities in July 1953, the regiment remained in Korea and acted as a defensive force against possible Communist attempts to resume the fighting. The 1st Marines returned to Camp Pendleton in April 1955. There it stayed for the following ten years, except for a brief deployment to Guantanamo Bay, Cuba, and the Caribbean Sea, during the 1962 Cuban Missile Crisis.

=== Vietnam War ===
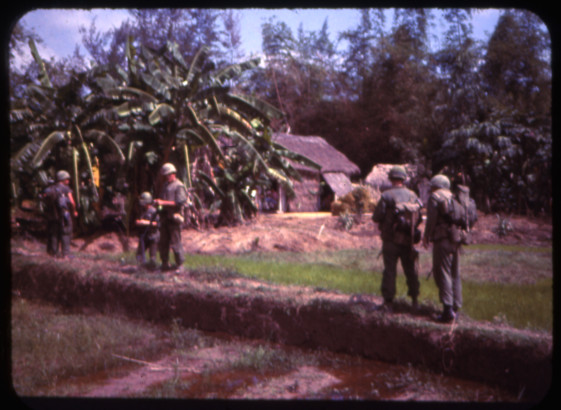
Marines from the 3rd Battalion, 1st Marines patrolling in 1966

With the intensification of the American involvement in the war in Vietnam in 1965, the 1st Marine Regiment was quickly deployed to the region. By January 1966, the entire regiment had completed its move to Vietnam. The first major operation in the war for a battalion of the 1st Marines was Operation Harvest Moon in December 1965.

By fall of 1967, the 1st Marines were operating permanently in the northern sector of the I Corps tactical zone. The following winter the communists launched their all-out Tet Offensive. The enemy overran Hue, the old imperial capital. Between 31 January and 2 March 1968, elements of the 1st Marines, commanded by Col. Stanley Hughes, along with other U.S. Marine and South Vietnamese units, fought to regain control of the city. Bitter street fighting and hand-to-hand combat characterized the battle. Hue was finally recaptured after the enemy suffered nearly 1,900 killed. The regiment remained deployed in South Vietnam for the next two and a half years, participating in numerous operations, both large and small. On 28 June 1971, the last members of the regiment departed Da Nang to return to the United States at MCB Camp Pendleton. The 1st Marines were the last marine infantry unit to depart Vietnam.

=== Post Vietnam era ===
In the spring of 1975, the 1st Marines provided primary support to the Marine Corps Base at Camp Pendleton for preparation of a camp to house Vietnamese refugees during Operation New Arrivals. In 1983, 1st Marines were assigned responsibility to provide the Ground Combat Element for the WESTPAC MAU. Since the inception of the special operations capable (SOC) marine expeditionary units (MEUs) in support of contingency operations in the Western Pacific, the 1st Marine Regiment has been the SOC regiment of the 1st Marine Division.

=== Operation Desert Storm and LA riots ===
In August 1990, Iraq invaded Kuwait and 1st Marines deployed in support of Operation Desert Shield. On 30 December 1990, 1st Marines was designated as Task Force Papa Bear. The task force attacked into Kuwait on 23 February and continued its march to the vicinity of Kuwait International Airport, where a battle took place on 27 February.

From 1 to 11 May 1992, elements of the regiment deployed to perform riot control operations as part of the Joint Special Purpose Marine Air Ground Task Force Los Angeles. They assumed a prominent role in quelling the urban unrest in South Central Los Angeles.

=== Operation Iraqi Freedom ===
In January 2003, 1st Marines deployed for Operation Iraqi Freedom. Organized as a 5,000-man combined arms task force, known as Regimental Combat Team One (RCT-1), the regiment fought its way from Kuwait to Baghdad, with significant actions at An Nasariyah, Al Kut, and Baghdad. On 5 April, commanding officer Colonel Joe D. Dowdy was relieved by Major General James Mattis and replaced by Colonel John Toolan, a highly unusual act. Subsequent to the collapse of the regime, the RCT conducted security and stability operations in Baghdad and Al Hillah until returning home throughout the summer of 2003.

In February 2004, 1st Marines deployed to the Al Anbar province of Iraq. Upon arrival in theater, 1st Marines formed into RCT-1 and conducted a relief-in-place with 3d Brigade of the 82d Airborne Division. RCT-1 consisted of several major subordinate commands from 1st Marine Division and various smaller attachments from throughout the Marine Corps.

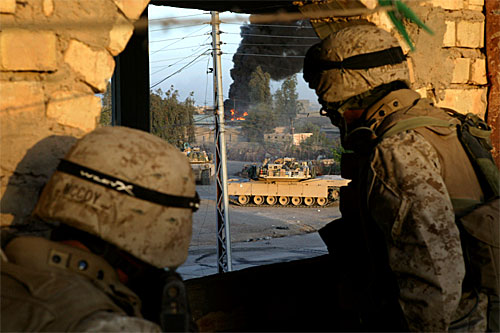
Marines of 1st Marine Regiment in Fallujah

The RCT's area of operation consisted of numerous cities, most important of which was Al Fallujah. On 31 March 2004, four U.S. citizens working for Blackwater USA were attacked, mutilated and hung on a bridge in the city. On 7 April 2004, Operation Vigilant Resolve commenced in response to these deaths. After intense urban fighting, a political resolution was mandated and the regiment was ordered out of the city.

Throughout September and October 2004, insurgent presence increased in Fallujah. Led by the 1st Marine Division, Operation Phantom Fury began with an assault north of the city, with four infantry battalions in the attack. Designated the division main effort, RCT-1 (3rd Battalion, 1st Marines) crossed the line of departure on 7 November 2004. After twelve days of intense urban combat, 1st Marine Division had defeated the insurgents and successfully fought its way to the southern end of the city capturing the western half of Fallujah. The success of this battle set the conditions for Fallujah to participate in the January 2005 Iraqi parliamentary election. The regiment returned to Camp Pendleton in April 2005.

== Unit awards ==
A unit citation or commendation is an award bestowed upon an organization for the action cited. Members of the unit who participated in said actions are allowed to wear on their uniforms the awarded unit citation. The 1st Marine Regiment has been presented with the following awards:

Streamer	Award	Year(s)	Additional Info
	Presidential Unit Citation Streamer with two Silver Stars & one Bronze Star	1942, 1944, 1945, 1950, 1950, 1951, 1965–66, 1966–67, 1967–1968, 1968, 1968, 2003	Guadalcanal, Peleliu-Ngesebus, Okinawa, Korea, Vietnam, Iraq
	Navy Unit Commendation Streamer with four bronze stars	1952–1953, 1990–91, 2004–05, 2008–09, 2010–11	Korea, Vietnam, Southwest Asia, Iraq, Afghanistan
	Meritorious Unit Commendation Streamer	1971	
	Mexican Service Streamer		
	Haitian Campaign Streamer		
	Marine Corps Expeditionary Streamer with two Bronze Stars		
	Dominican Campaign Streamer		
	World War I Victory Streamer		
	American Defense Service Streamer with one Bronze Star	1941	World War II
	Asiatic-Pacific Campaign Streamer with one Silver and one Bronze Star		Guadalcanal, Eastern New Guinea, New Britain, Peleliu, Okinawa
	World War II Victory Streamer	1941–1945	Pacific War
	Navy Occupation Service Streamer with "ASIA"		
	China Service Streamer		North China
	National Defense Service Streamer with three Bronze Stars	1950–1954, 1961–1974, 1990–1995, 2001–present	Korean War, Vietnam War, Gulf War, war on terrorism
	Korean Service Streamer with two Silver Stars	1950–1953	Inchon-Seoul, Chosin Reservoir, East-Central Front, Western Front
	Armed Forces Expeditionary Streamer		
	Vietnam Service Streamer with two Silver and three Bronze Stars	August 1965 – April 1971	
	Southwest Asia Service Streamer with three Bronze Stars		
	Afghanistan Campaign Streamer with two Bronze Stars		
	Iraq Campaign Streamer with four Bronze Stars		
	Global War on Terrorism Expeditionary Streamer		March–May 2003
	Global War on Terrorism Service Streamer	2001–present	
	Korea Presidential Unit Citation Streamer		
	Vietnam Gallantry Cross with Palm Streamer		
	Vietnam Meritorious Unit Citation Civil Actions Streamer		

== Medal of Honor recipients ==
Nineteen Marines from the 1st Marines have been awarded the Medal of Honor: seven during World War II, ten during the Korean War, and three during the Vietnam War. (Note: The Alfredo C. Gonzalez Medal of Honor action occurred after the publication of Johnstone (1968)'s work.)

- World War II
  - Capt Everett P. Pope, Peleliu
  - Pfc William A. Foster, Okinawa
  - Sgt Elbert L. Kinser, Okinawa
  - Cpl John P. Fardy, Okinawa
  - Pvt Dale M. Hansen, Okinawa
  - Cpl Louis J. Hauge, Jr., Okinawa
- Korean War
  - Pfc Walter C. Monegan, Jr.
  - Pfc Stanley R. Christianson
  - 1stLt Henry A. Commiskey
  - Pfc William B. Baugh
  - Maj Reginald R. Myers
  - Capt Carl L. Sitter
  - TSgt Harold E. Wilson
  - Cpl Charles G. Abrell
  - Pfc Edward Gomez
  - Cpl Joseph Vittori
- Vietnam War
  - Pfc Gary W. Martini
  - Sgt Alfredo C. Gonzalez
  - GySgt John Canley

== See also ==
- List of United States Marine Corps regiments
- Organization of the United States Marine Corps
