= Henry A. Commiskey Sr. =

Henry Alfred Commiskey Sr.
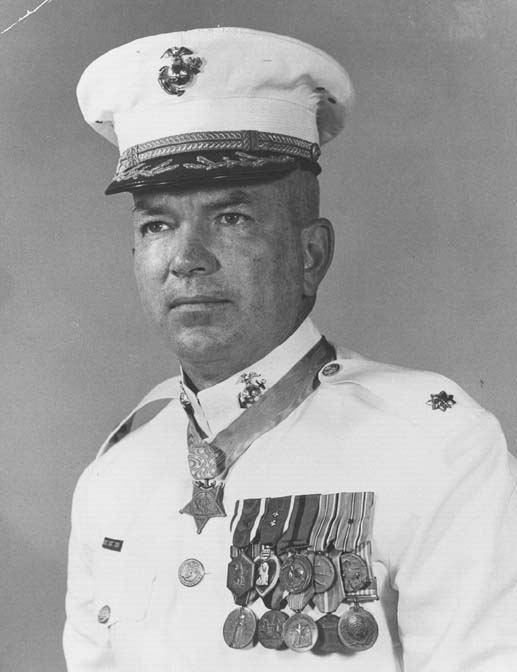
- Commiskey in c. 1960s
- Born: January 10, 1927; Hattiesburg, Mississippi
- Died: August 16, 1971 (aged 44); Meridian, Mississippi
- Burial place: Cremated; ashes scattered in the Pacific Ocean
- Military career
- Allegiance: United States
- Branch: United States Marine Corps
- Service years: 1944–1966
- Rank: Major
- Units: 1st Battalion 1st Marines; Marine Attack Squadron 212
- Conflicts: World War II; Battle of Iwo Jima; Korean War; Battle of Inchon; Battle of Chosin Reservoir
- Awards: Medal of Honor; Purple Heart (3); Commendation Medal

Henry Alfred Commiskey Sr. (January 10, 1927 – August 16, 1971) was a United States Marine who served during World War II at the Battle of Iwo Jima and in the Korean War in the Inchon landing. As a lieutenant, he was the first Marine to receive the Medal of Honor — the nation's highest decoration for valor — for extraordinary heroism in the Korean War, leading a charge up a hill and killing seven enemy soldiers in hand-to-hand combat.

== Early life ==
Henry Commiskey was born on January 10, 1927, in Hattiesburg, Mississippi. He attended Sacred Heart School in Hattiesburg and worked as a brakeman on the Illinois Central Railroad before joining the Marine Corps on January 12, 1944, two days after his 17th birthday.

== Military career ==
Commiskey served in the enlisted ranks more than five years, including 21 months overseas. He completed his recruit training in San Diego, California. He then served at Camp Pendleton; Hawaii; in the Pacific Theatre during World War II, and in Japan. Commiskey was of Irish descent.

=== World War II ===
During World War II, he was wounded in action during the Iwo Jima campaign — for which received the Letter of Commendation for "exhibiting high qualities of leadership and courage in the face of a stubborn and fanatical enemy".

Commiskey also had been a drill instructor at the Marine Corps Recruit Depot Parris Island, South Carolina. He was serving there, with the rank of staff sergeant, when he was accepted for officer training and commissioned a second lieutenant on September 10, 1949. He completed training in June 1950, and taught in the tactics section at the Marine Corps Schools Quantico, Virginia, before going to Korea with the 1st Marine Regiment, in August 1950.

=== Korean War ===
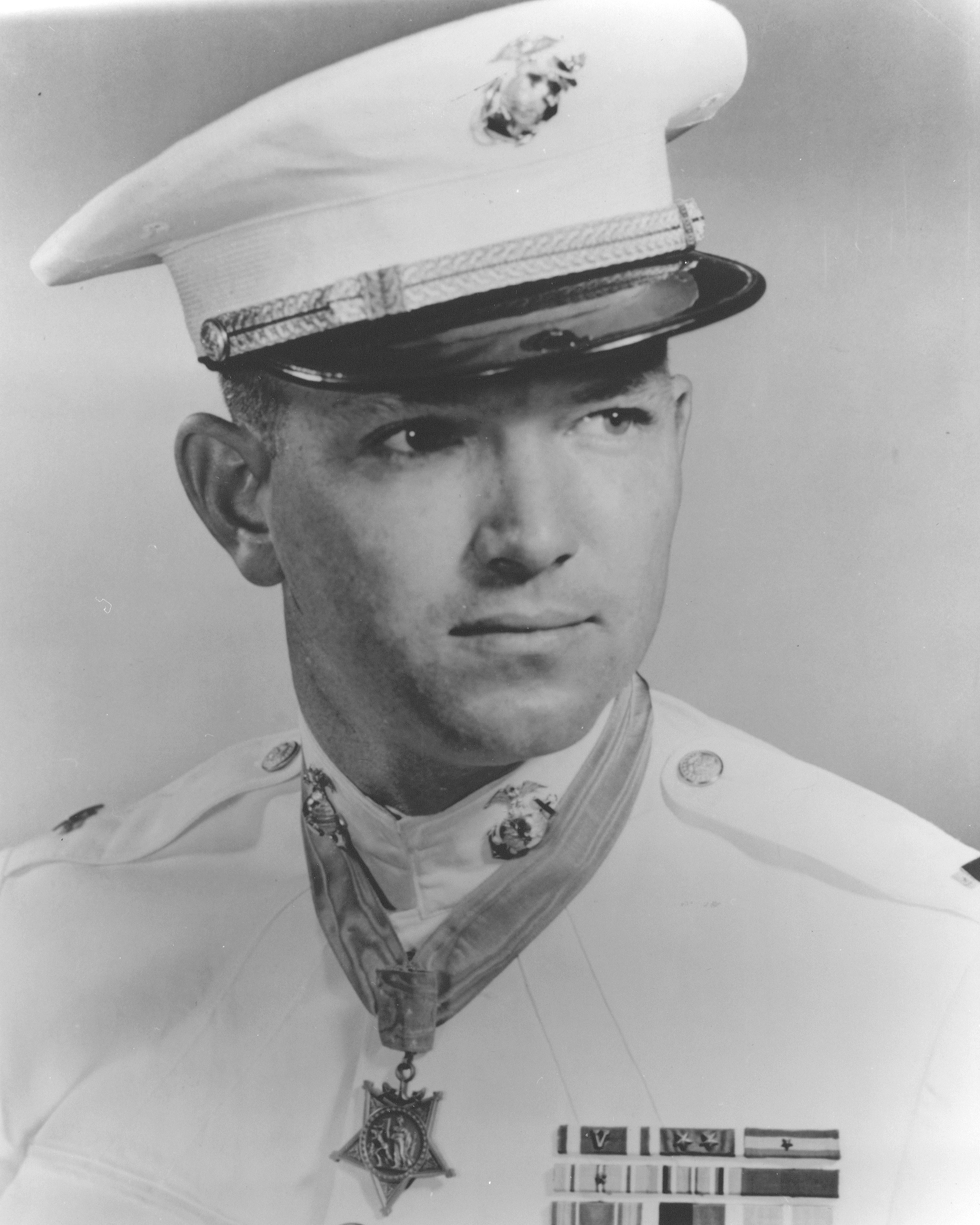

The action for which First Lieutenant Commiskey received the Medal of Honor came a few days after the Inchon landing, in which he participated.

The action occurred on September 20, 1950, near Yongdungpo, Korea, on the outskirts of Seoul. Although Commiskey, then a second lieutenant, escaped harm then, he was wounded a week later, and again on December 8, 1950, after which he was returned to the U.S. for hospitalization.

Following hospitalization at the Naval Hospital in Pensacola, Commiskey served at the Naval Air Rocket Test Station, Lake Denmark, Morris County, New Jersey. He was promoted to first lieutenant in June, 1951.

On August 1, 1951, he was presented the nation's highest decoration for valor by President Harry S. Truman in a White House ceremony for his actions on September 20, 1950, near Yongdungpo, Korea, on the outskirts of Seoul.

=== Aviator and later career ===
In September 1951, he became a student naval aviator at the Naval Air Station, Pensacola. He received his wings at Corpus Christi in June 1953, and later completed jet training at El Toro, California. He was promoted to captain in July 1953.

In April 1954, he returned to Korea as a pilot with Marine Attack Squadron 212, Marine Aircraft Group 12, 1st Marine Aircraft Wing.

He returned to the United States in September 1954, and at his own request was assigned line duty. He joined the 1st Marine Division in December 1954, and served consecutively as a company commander, assistant S-3 of the 1st Service Regiment, and division reenlistment officer. From September 1956 until July 1959, he served as officer in charge of the Marine Corps Recruiting Station, 6th Marine Corps Reserve and Recruitment District, Jackson, Mississippi. He was promoted to major in July 1959.

Commiskey completed the Junior Course at the Marine Corps Schools, Quantico, Virginia, in June 1960, then served as an instructor, student company commander and executive officer, the Basic School, Quantico. Prior to his retirement from active duty in August 1966, he served as a recruiter.

== Final years ==
Eventually he moved to Meridian, Mississippi, where he lived in his final years. His father died in 1969 and Commiskey's health had deteriorated. His wife came home August 16, 1971, and found him dead at the age of 44. At the inquest, the county coroner ruled it was a self-inflicted gunshot wound. He was cremated and his ashes scattered over the Pacific Ocean by his son in honor of his service. A cenotaph was erected at Highland Cemetery in Hattiesburg, Mississippi.

== Awards and honors ==
=== Medal of Honor citation ===
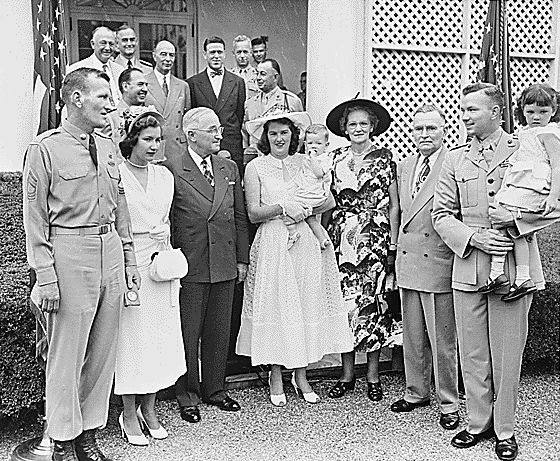
Lt. Commiskey, at right holding his daughter, with his family and President Harry Truman during his Medal of Honor presentation ceremony. His brother, Sgt. Michael Commiskey, USA, and Michael's wife Bertie stand to President Truman's right; Lt. Commiskey's wife and his parents (Hugh Walsh Commiskey and Cassandra Haigwood Commiskey) stand immediately to his right in this photograph.

The President of the United States takes pleasure in presenting the Medal of Honor to

First Lieutenant Henry A. Commiskey
United States Marine Corps

for service as set forth in the following Citation:

For conspicuous gallantry and intrepidity at the risk of his life above and beyond the call of duty while serving as a Platoon Leader in Company C, First Battalion, First Marines, First Marine Division (Reinforced), in action against enemy aggressor forces near Yongdungp'o, Korea, on 20 September 1950. Directed to attack hostile forces well dug in on Hill 85, First Lieutenant Commiskey, then Second Lieutenant, spearheaded the assault, charging up the steep slopes on the run. Coolly disregarding the heavy enemy machine-gun and small-arms fire, he plunged on well forward of the rest of his platoon and was the first man to reach the crest of the objective. Armed only with a pistol, he jumped into a hostile machine-gun emplacement occupied by five enemy troops and quickly disposed of four of the soldiers with his automatic pistol. Grappling with the fifth, First Lieutenant Commiskey knocked him to the ground and held him until he could obtain a weapon from another member of his platoon and kill the last of the enemy gun crew. Continuing his bold assault, he moved to the next emplacement, killed two or more of the enemy and then led his platoon toward the rear nose of the hill to rout the remainder of the enemy. His valiant leadership and courageous fighting spirit served to inspire the men of his company to heroic endeavor in seizing the objective and reflect the highest credit upon First Lieutenant Commiskey and the United States Naval Service.

/S/ Harry S. Truman

=== Military decorations ===
Commiskey was awarded the following decorations:

Badge	Naval Aviator Badge		
1st Row	Medal of Honor	Purple Heart with two gold stars	Navy & Marine Corps Commendation Medal with Combat "V"
2nd row	Combat Action Ribbon	Presidential Unit Citation with two bronze stars	Marine Corps Good Conduct Medal
3rd row	American Campaign Medal	Asiatic-Pacific Campaign Medal with one bronze star	World War II Victory Medal
4th row	Navy Occupation Service Medal with Asia clasp	National Defense Service Medal with one bronze star	Korean Service Medal with three bronze stars
5th row	Korean Presidential Unit Citation	United Nations Korea Medal	Korean War Service Medal

=== Namesake ===
On June 5, 2004, a United States Postal Service facility in Hattiesburg, Mississippi, was officially named the "Major Henry A. Commiskey Sr., Post Office Building".

== See also ==
- List of Korean War Medal of Honor recipients
