= Richard P. Mills (general) =

US Marine Corps general

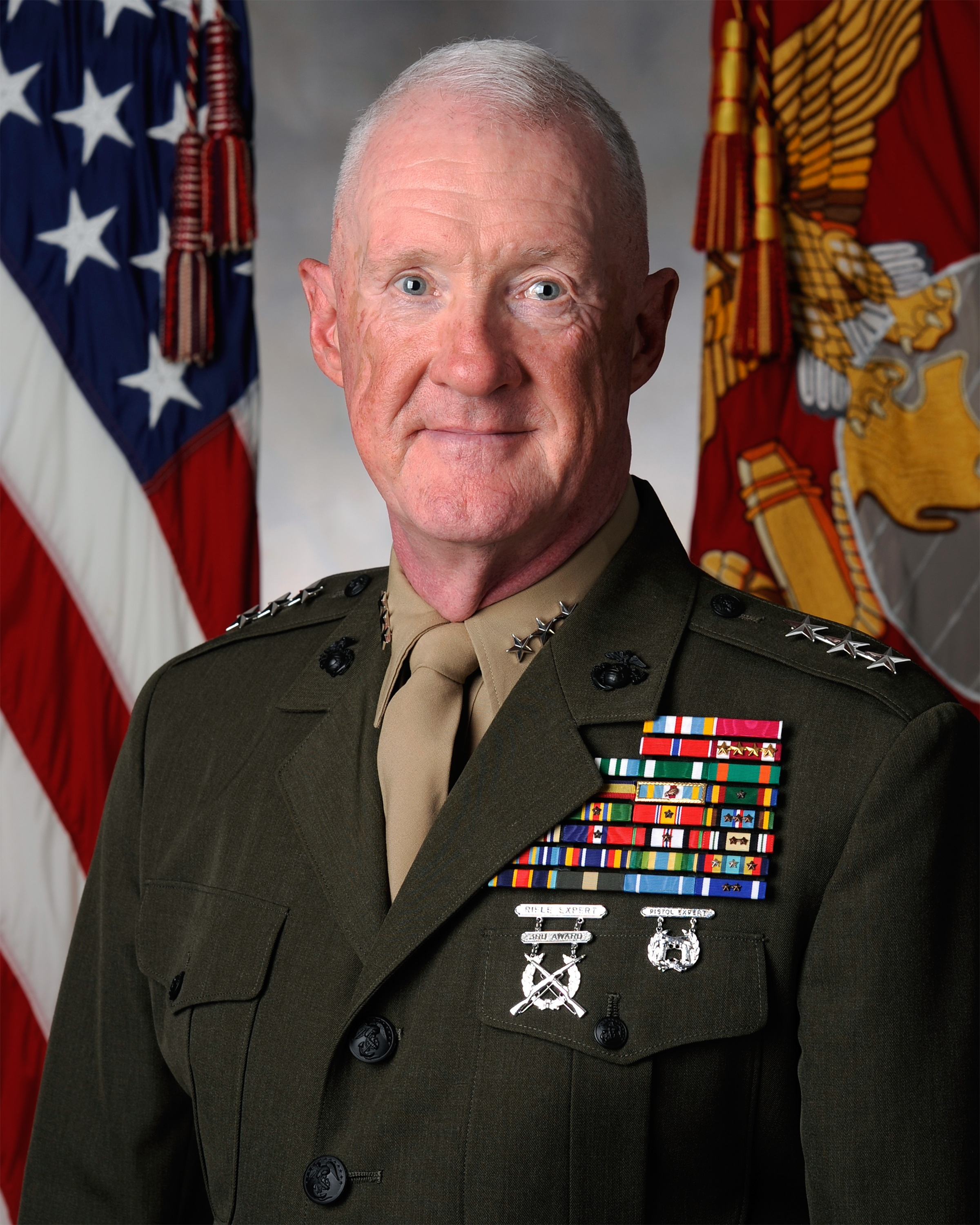
- Born: 14 June 1950 (age 76); Huntington, New York, U.S.
- Military career
- Allegiance: United States of America
- Branch: United States Marine Corps
- Service years: 1975 – 2015
- Rank: Lieutenant general
- Commands: Marine Forces Reserve; Marine Corps Combat Development Command; Regional Command Southwest / I Marine Expeditionary Force (Forward); Multi-National Force - West (Iraq); 1st Marine Division; 24th Marine Expeditionary Unit; 3rd Battalion, 6th Marines
- Conflicts: Operation Joint Guardian; War in Afghanistan; Operation Enduring Freedom; Operation Iraqi Freedom
- Awards: Defence Superior Service Medal; Legion of Merit

Lieutenant General Richard P. Mills is a retired United States Marine Corps officer, who served as commander of the Marine Forces Reserve from 2013 to 2015 and Marine Forces North, headquartered at the Marine Corps Support Facility New Orleans. Previously he was deputy commandant for combat development and integration and commanding general, Marine Corps Combat Development Command in Quantico, Virginia, and, prior to that assignment, was commander of the I Marine Expeditionary Force (Forward)/Regional Command Southwest in Afghanistan.

== Biography ==
A native of Huntington, New York, Mills graduated from Franklin and Marshall College with a BA in political science and a minor in history and was commissioned in 1975 as a second lieutenant via Officer Candidate School.

He reported to 1st Battalion, 5th Marines, 1st Marine Division at Camp Pendleton where he served until 1978.

Following that he was assigned for a year to the 3rd Marine Division on Okinawa, Japan.

From 1979 to 1982 he was part of the 2nd Recruit Training Battalion at Parris Island, South Carolina. Upon his promotion to captain he assumed command of Company D, Recruit Training Regiment.

Captain Mills studied at the Amphibious Warfare School in Quantico, Virginia, then moved to the 6th Marines, 2nd Marine Division at Camp Lejeune, North Carolina.

He was promoted to major in 1986 and assigned to Marine Corps Headquarters in Washington, DC, from 1986 to 1989. He later attended the Marine Corps Command and Staff College, then spent a year as a Military Observer with the United Nations in Palestine.

He was promoted to lieutenant colonel and served as the operations officer of the 26th Marine Expeditionary Unit (Special Operations Capable) from 1993 to 1995. Following that he was assigned to the staff of the commander of the United States Sixth Fleet in Gaeta, Italy. He returned to the 2nd Marine Division in 1997 when he assumed command of 3rd Battalion, 6th Marines.

Lieutenant Colonel Mills studied at the UK Royal College of Defence Studies in London in 1999. before returning to II Marine Expeditionary Force.

He was selected to command the 24th Marine Expeditionary Unit (Special Operations Capable) in 2000 and promoted to colonel. Under his command the 24th MEU (SOC) deployed in Operation Joint Guardian in Kosovo, Operation Enduring Freedom in Afghanistan, and combat operations during Operation Iraqi Freedom as part of Task Force Tarawa.

In June 2003 Colonel Mills reported to Headquarters, United States European Command in Stuttgart, Germany, as the assistant chief of staff. Upon his promotion to brigadier general in May 2004 he became the deputy director of operations at EUCOM. In 2006 he was assigned to the Headquarters of the Marine Corps as director, Manpower Management Division.

In May 2007 Brigadier General Mills became commander of the 1st Marine Division and spent most of the next two years in Iraq.

He was promoted to major general in late 2007 and from October 2007 to January 2009 served in a dual role as assistant division commander, 1st Marine Division and commander, Ground Combat Element, Multi-national Forces – West in Al Anbar Province, Iraq. Upon his return from Iraq, Major General Mills continued as assistant division commander until July 2009, when he resumed command of the 1st Marine Division.

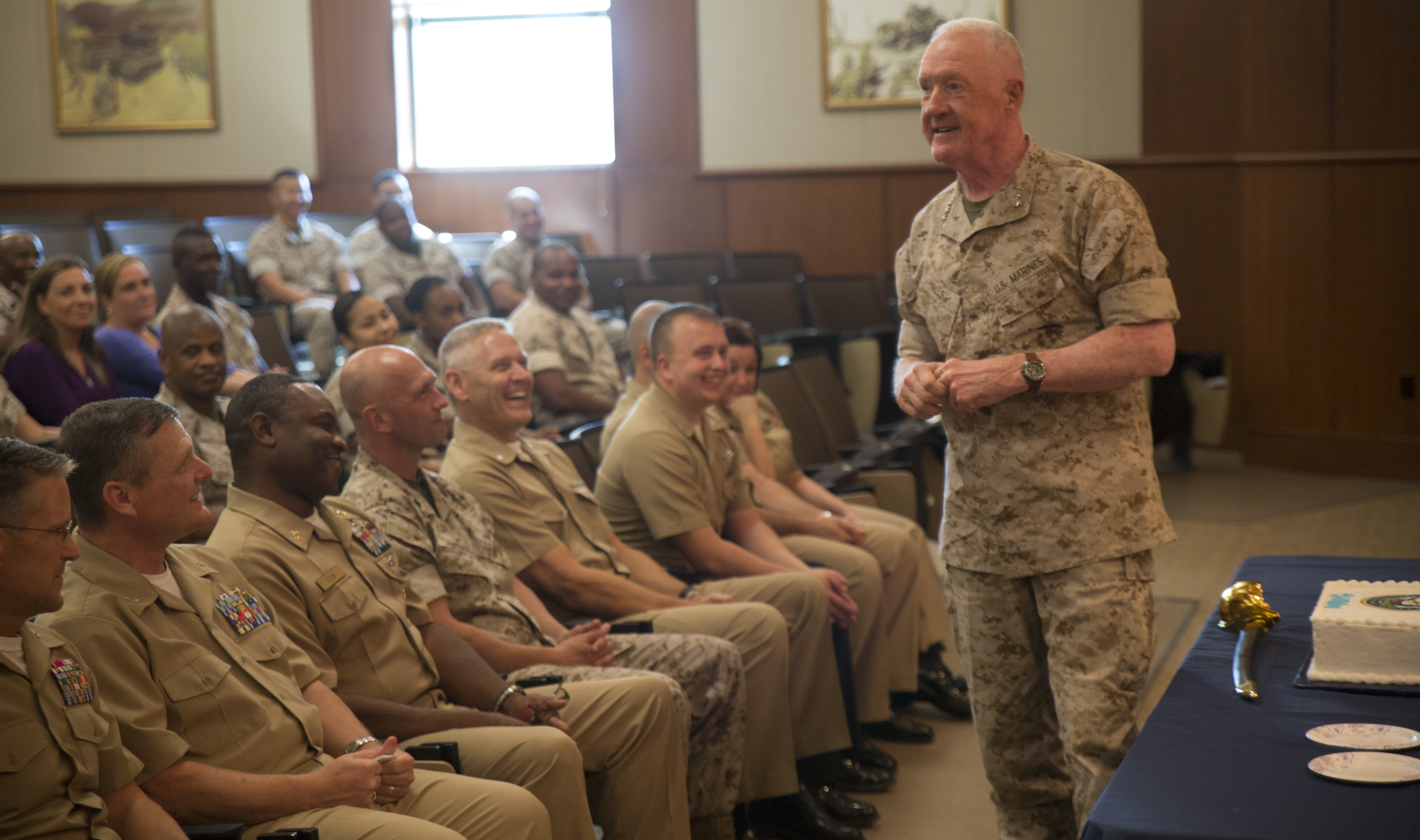
LtGen Mills at the Navy's birthday celebration ceremony at Marine Corps Support Facility New Orleans, Oct. 15, 2014.

In December 2009 Major General Mills was selected to command the I Marine Expeditionary Force (Forward), deployed to Afghanistan in April 2010, and assumed command of all Marine combat units in the country. As part of a restructuring of the NATO-led mission in Afghanistan, Regional Command South (commanded by British Major General Nick Carter) was split into two commands. Carter remained in charge of Kandahar and Mills became the commander of the newly formed Regional Command Southwest and took under command 8,000 of the 9,500 British troops in Afghanistan, as well as 20,000 U.S. Marines in Helmand Province.

In Afghanistan, He made clear that his objective involved more than just victory on the battlefield. On the importance of training Afghan forces to succeed, he has been quoted as saying "We will be here with them as we develop the Afghan security forces to eventually take over our role, so we can leave," On the importance of not leaving Afghanistan until the country is ready, he has also been reported as saying the Afghans "have been very, very concerned we may leave them prematurely."

After his return from Afghanistan, Mills was promoted to the rank of lieutenant general in July 2011 and replaced Lieutenant General George Flynn as deputy commandant for combat development and integration and commanding general, Marine Corps Combat Development Command in Quantico, Virginia.

In August 2013, LtGen Mills assumed command of Marine Forces Reserve and Marine Forces North, and served in this capacity until his retirement on October 1, 2015, after 40 years of active service. He currently serves as president and chief executive officer of the Marine Corps University Foundation.

Lieutenant General Mills has a reputation for having a good sense of humor and being open to subordinates, officers have told reporters. Junior officers are "not afraid to approach him".

Lt.Gen Mills is an avid fan of the New York Giants football team.

== Awards and decorations ==

1st row	Defense Superior Service Medal	Legion of Merit with one gold award star	Meritorious Service Medal with four award stars	Joint Service Commendation Medal
2nd row	Navy Commendation Medal	Navy Achievement Medal	Navy Presidential Unit Citation	Joint Meritorious Unit Award with one bronze oak leaf cluster
3rd row	Navy Unit Commendation with one service star	Navy Meritorious Unit Commendation with one service star	National Defense Service Medal with one service star	Armed Forces Expeditionary Medal with three service stars
4th row	Southwest Asia Service Medal with two service stars	Kosovo Campaign Medal with one service star	Afghanistan Campaign Medal with one service star	Iraq Campaign Medal with two service stars
5th row	Global War on Terrorism Expeditionary Medal	Global War on Terrorism Service Medal	Armed Forces Service Medal	Navy Sea Service Deployment Ribbon with seven stars
6th row	Navy and Marine Corps Overseas Service Ribbon	Marine Corps Drill Instructor Ribbon	United Nations Medal	NATO Medal with two stars
7th row	RIFLE EXPERT Badge (3rd award)		PISTOL EXPERT Badge	
