= Regional Command Southwest =

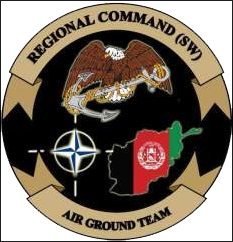
- Active: 3 July 2010 – 2014
- Allegiance: NATO
- Type: International formation
- Part of: International Security Assistance Force
- Former HQ: Camp Leatherneck
- War: War in Afghanistan
- Website: www.isaf.nato.int/subordinate-commands/rc-southwest (archived)

Regional Command Southwest, abbreviated RC(SW), was an international military formation, of roughly division size, which was one of the components of the International Security Assistance Force in Afghanistan. It was stood up on 3 July 2010 largely from an area previously in Regional Command South. It was headquartered at Camp Leatherneck with an area of responsibility of largely Helmand and Nimruz provinces. The United States Marine Corps provides the majority of the force headquarters. It consisted of Task Force Helmand of the British Armed Forces (including Denmark and Estonia) and Task Force Leatherneck of the United States Marine Corps. Provincial Reconstruction Team Helmand was also located in Regional Command Southwest. The command was stood down during 2014.

== Previous commanders ==
- Major General Richard P. Mills 2010-March 2011
- Major General John A. Toolan March 2011-March 2012
- Major General Charles M. Gurganus March 2012 – 2013
- Major General Walter L. Miller 2013–2014
- Brigadier General Dan Yoo 2014

== See also ==
- Train Advise Assist Command – Capital
- Train Advise Assist Command – North
- Train Advise Assist Command – East
- Train Advise Assist Command – South
- Train Advise Assist Command – West
- Train Advise Assist Command – Air
- NATO
