= Arthur T. Mason =

United States Marine Corps general

Arthur Theodore Mason
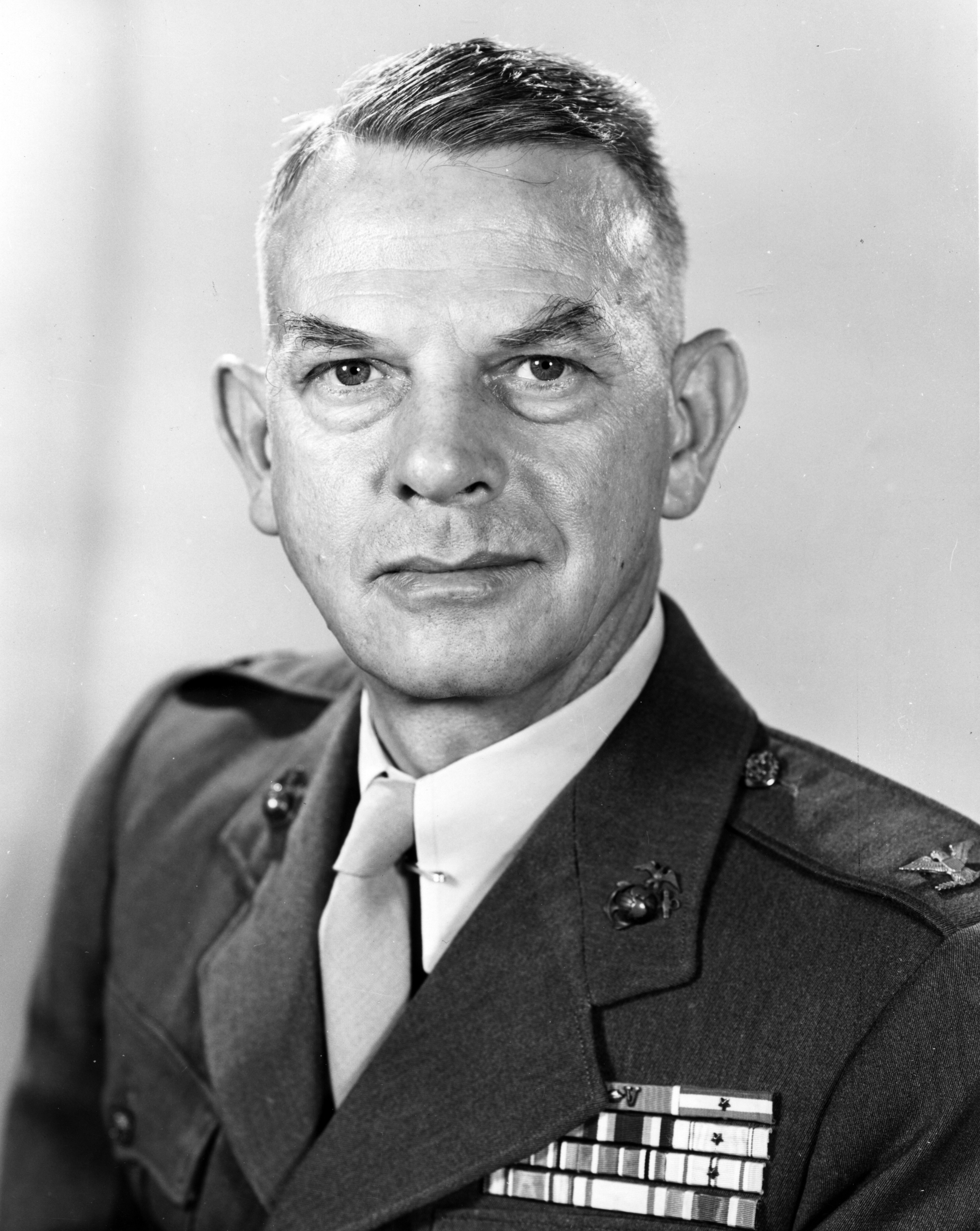
- Mason as colonel, USMC
- Born: October 3, 1902; Washington, D.C.
- Died: August 24, 1980 (aged 77); California
- Military career
- Allegiance: United States of America
- Branch: United States Marine Corps
- Service years: 1923–1954
- Rank: Brigadier general
- Service number: 0-3881
- Commands: 1st Marine Regiment; CoS, Department of the Pacific
- Conflicts: Yangtze Patrol; World War II: Battle of Okinawa; Chinese Civil War
- Awards: Legion of Merit (2)

Arthur Theodore Mason (October 3, 1902 – August 24, 1980) was a decorated officer of the United States Marine Corps with the rank of brigadier general. He is most noted as commanding officer of the 1st Marine Regiment during the Battle of Okinawa and later also during the Chinese Civil War following the World War II.

== Early career and World War II ==
Mason was born on October 3, 1902, in Washington, D.C., but his family later moved to California. He attended the University of California and graduated with Bachelor of Science degree in June 1923. Mason subsequently entered the Marine Corps service and was commissioned second lieutenant at the same time. He was ordered to the Basic School for his officer training and following the graduation in the summer of 1924, he was attached to the 4th Marine Regiment and sailed for his first expeditionary duty in China.

During his service in China, he took part in the guard duties at Shanghai International Settlement and served in that capacity until his return to the United States in 1927. Mason then served two tours of sea duties and took part in the cruises to Australia and New Zealand. In 1936, he reached the rank of captain.

In 1938, Mason was ordered to France and attended the prestigious École spéciale militaire de Saint-Cyr. He then served at the United States Embassy in Paris and served in that capacity during the Battle of France in May 1940. Mason assisted in the evacuation of U.S. nationals from the country and subsequently received Letter of commendation from Ambassador William C. Bullitt. He then served as assistant naval attache at U.S. Embassy in London, England and witnessed the German bombardment of cities and industrial centers.

While in London, Mason accompanied Major John C. McQueen from Division of Plans and Policies at Headquarters Marine Corps, during the observation of training of British Commandos and especially to study the landing craft in use by the British. He returned to the United States in late 1941 and was attached to the staff of United States Fleet under Admiral Ernest King. Mason served in that capacity for several months, before he was attached to the staff of South East Asia Command under Lord Mountbatten. He was promoted to the rank of colonel on October 30, 1943.

Mason served on the headquarters of South East Asia Command at British Ceylon until April 1945, when he was transferred to Okinawa. He was transferred to the staff of 1st Marine Regiment at the beginning of May, 1945. The 1st Marines, which spent last month with patrolling as reserve force of 1st Marine Division, just commenced the assault on main Japanese defensive positions and suffered heavy losses.

The 1st Marine Division commander, Pedro del Valle, relieved commanding officer of 1st Marine Regiment, Colonel Kenneth B. Chappell, and chose Mason as his substitute. Mason renewed the attack and restored the morale of the troops and repelled several Banzai charges. After Okinawa was declared secured on June 22, Mason and his troops were tasked with the cleaning of scattered Japanese groups of soldiers and searching for hidden soldiers. Mason was later decorated with the Legion of Merit with Combat "V" for his leadership during the Okinawa campaign.

== Later career ==
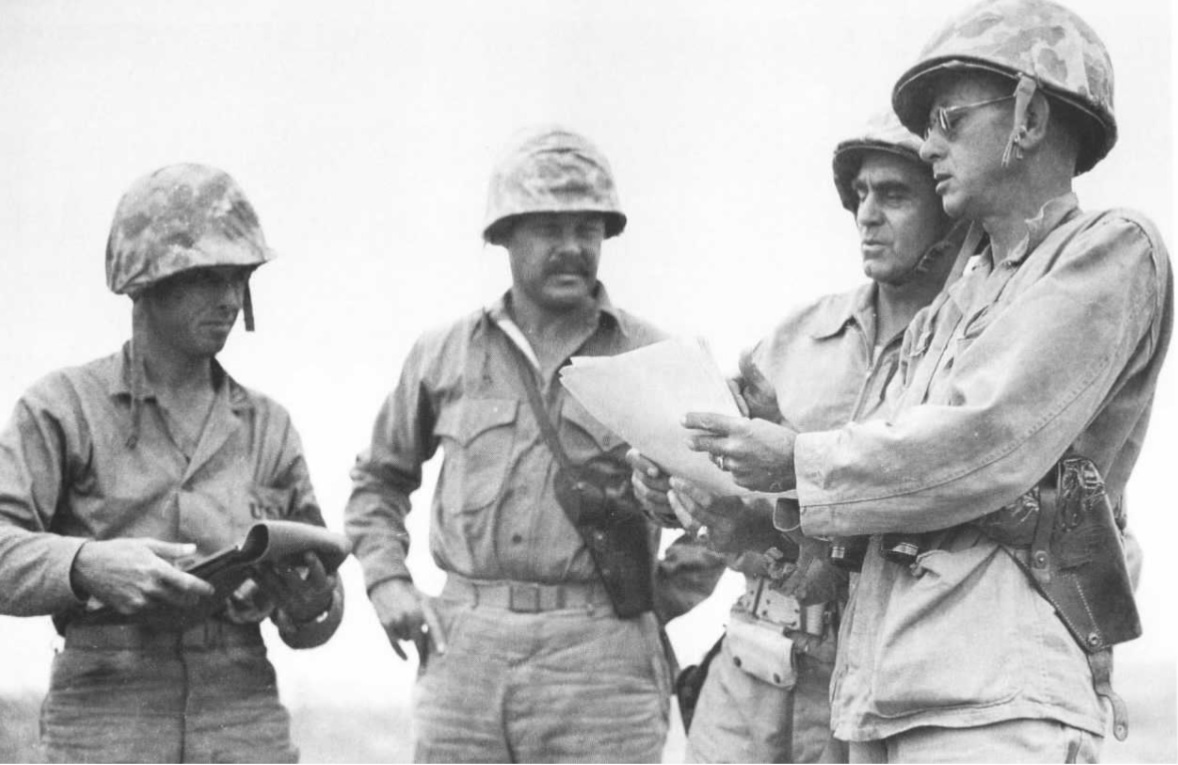
Captain Richard Boyd, Lt.col. James C. Magee Jr. (2nd Battalion, 1st Marines), Major General Pedro del Valle (Commander 1st Marine Division) and Arthur T. Mason (1st Marine Regiment) during the Okinawa campaign in May 1945.

Colonel Mason remained in command of 1st Marines after the Okinawa campaign and spent almost three months stationed at division camp at Motobu Peninsula. Mason and his regiment were subsequently ordered to Tianjin, China on September 30, 1945. Its mission was to assist in the repatriation of Japanese troops from North China. The 1st Marines also took part in the guard duty of property and rounded up Japanese repatriates. Mason and his units came often under fire of Chinese Communist guerrillas.

Because of the constant threat of communist attack on the bridges and railway supplies, his marines were used also for guard duty of these. Mason remained in China until September 19, 1946, and subsequently returned to the United States. For his service in connection with repatriation of Japanese troops, Mason received his second Legion of Merit by the Army. He also received Order of the Cloud and Banner, 5th Class by the Government of Republic of China.

Following his return stateside, Mason was ordered for the course to Armed Forces Staff College at Norfolk, Virginia. After his graduation, he served for more than two years as faculty member and subsequently was ordered to Joint Chiefs of Staff under General Omar Bradley.

His final assignment came in August 1950, when Mason was ordered to San Francisco, California, and appointed chief of staff, Department of the Pacific under Major General Ray A. Robinson and later under Henry D. Linscott. Briefly before his retirement, Mason also served as deputy commander of that command. He finally retired from the Marine Corps after 31 years of service in May 1954. Mason was promoted to the rank of brigadier general for having been specially commended in combat.

== Decorations ==
Here is the ribbon bar of Brigadier General Arthur T. Mason:

1st Row	Legion of Merit with one Oak Leaf Cluster and Combat "V"	Navy Presidential Unit Citation with one star	Marine Corps Expeditionary Medal	Yangtze Service Medal
2nd Row	American Defense Service Medal with Foreign Service Clasp	American Campaign Medal	European–African–Middle Eastern Campaign Medal	Asiatic-Pacific Campaign Medal with one 3/16 inch service star
3rd Row	World War II Victory Medal	China Service Medal	National Defense Service Medal	Chinese Order of the Cloud and Banner, 5th Class

Military offices
Preceded by Kenneth B. Chappell	Commanding Officer of the 1st Marine Regiment; May 6, 1945 — September 19, 1946	Succeeded by James M. Ranck, Jr.
