= Combat Logistics Battalion 2 =

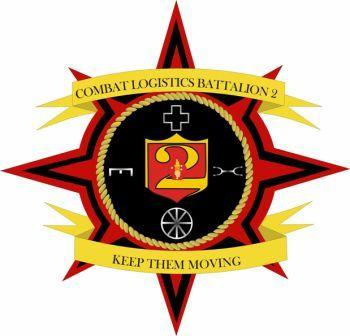
- Country: United States
- Allegiance: United States of America
- Branch: United States Marine Corps
- Type: Logistics
- Role: Combat Service Support
- Size: 500-800
- Part of: Combat Logistics Regiment 2; 2nd Marine Logistics Group
- Garrison/HQ: Marine Corps Base Camp Lejeune
- Motto: "Keep them moving"
- Engagements: Operation Enduring Freedom; Operation Iraqi Freedom * Operation New Market * Operation Matador * Operation Steel Curtain

Commanders
- Current commander: LtCol Dan Walker

Combat Logistics Battalion 2 (CLB-2) is a logistics unit of the United States Marine Corps (USMC), which provides direct combat service support to Regimental Combat Team 2 (RCT-2). CLB-2 was formed after its second deployment to Iraq in 2005 as a part of the reorganization of the 2nd Force Service Support Group (2nd FSSG). The battalion falls under Combat Logistics Regiment 2 and the 2nd Marine Logistics Group (2nd MLG) and is headquartered at Marine Corps Base Camp Lejeune, North Carolina in the USA.

== Mission ==
CLB-2's mission is to provide direct support and tactical logistics to the 2nd Marine Division and its subordinate units to prepare and sustain them in combat operations.

Organized to provide the full range of combat logistics functions and capabilities necessary, CLB-2 helps to maintain the continued readiness and sustainability of the Marine Air-Ground Task Force as a whole. The LCE is task organized to provide the full range of combat logistics functions and capabilities necessary to maintain the continued readiness and sustainability of the MAGTF as a whole. LCEs form around a combat logistics headquarters, and may vary in size and composition from a support detachment to one or more Marine Logistics Groups (MLG).

Combat Logistics Battalion-2, a subordinate command of 2nd Marine Logistics Group and Combat Logistics Regiment-2, fulfills this role as the LCE. CLB-2 supports the MAGTF by providing tactical logistics to the Marine division beyond their organic capabilities. In addition, the LCE provides throughput and distribution support to the Marine Expeditionary Force (MEF) and serves as the Logistics Combat Element headquarters for a Marine Air-Ground Task Force.

== Subordinate units ==
- Headquarters and Service Company - H&S Company is tasked to provide command and control and command functions for CLB-2 in support of an infantry regiment.
- Transportation Support Company - TS Company is tasked to provide direct support of medium and heavy lift, motor transportation support and materials and container handler support for throughput and sustainment operations of an infantry regiment.

== Logo ==
The compass on the CLB-2 logo is adopted from the logo of 2nd Marine Logistics Group. The center shield displayed has been pulled from the logo of 2nd Marine Regiment. The combination of the two elements signifies the direct support relationship between Combat Logistics Battalion 2 and 2nd Marine Regiment. The symbols surrounding the "2" represent the capabilities residing within the battalion; Health Service support, Maintenance, Motor Transportation and Engineers.

== Motto ==
CLB-2's motto is "Keep them moving". The motto is an adaptation of the 2nd Marine Regiment's motto "Keep moving" which has its origins in the Battle of Tarawa. During this battle, 2nd Marine Regiment continued moving forward under heavy fire to advance within enemy lines.

Although the mission of Combat Logistics Battalion-2 is to provide direct support tactical logistics to 2nd Marine Division and its subordinate units, CLB-2 is often tasked to support other units. "Keep them moving" highlights the historical relationship between the battalion and the 2nd Marine Regiment.

== History ==
=== Participation in War on Terrorism ===
Activated on 21 April 2006 at MCB Camp Lejeune, NC, Combat Logistics Battalion 2 was assigned to Combat Logistics Regiment 2, 2nd Marine Logistics Group.

On 28 November 2006, the Marine Corps announced that Combat Logistics Battalion 2 would make its third deployment to Iraq in support of Operation Iraqi Freedom in early 2007. This would be CLB-2's first deployment since the reorganization. They deployed from February 2007 through September 2007 to the Al Anbar Province relieving Combat Logistics Battalion 1 (CLB-1) upon arrival and being relieved by Combat Logistics Battalion 4 (CLB-4) upon its departure.

While deployed to Iraq, CLB-2 participated in a number of combat operations including Operations Matador, New Market and Sword. CLB-2 was primarily stationed in the Al Anbar province and carried out convoys to units from its logistical hub on the former Iraqi airbase at Al Asad. The supplies being transported were primarily food, water, ammunition and fuel. During operations, the battalion encountered over 200 incidents with the enemy, the vast majority of which consisted of improvised explosive devices (IEDs) and mines.

CLB-2 also conducted convoys providing exchange, postal and disbursing services, bringing relief and comfort to Marines, soldiers, and sailors in remote areas. These convoys were called Warfighter Express Service Teams, or WES Teams.

In May 2007, CLB-2 provided logistical, medical and mortuary support to Regimental Combat Team-2 (RCT-2), 2nd Marine Division, clearing cities along the Euphrates River near the Syrian border during Operation Matador. In addition to providing logistical support, CLB-2 also conducted security and clearing missions during this time. CLB-2 was relieved by CLB-4 and returned home in September 2007.

After several months of pre-deployment training, CLB-2 again deployed to the Anbar Province of Iraq in late Summer, 2008. CLB-2 returned from deployment in March 2009, ending its role in Operation Iraqi Freedom.

After a year CLB-2 deployed to Afghanistan in July 2010 in support of Operation Enduring Freedom (OEF), returning home in February 2011. During this deployment CLB-2 encountered 164 IEDs strikes, found over 50 IEDs, conducted 37 medical evacuations, encountered small arms fire 61 times, captured two enemy personnel, engaged in 15 fire fights, and called in four close air support missions.

Another year later CLB-2 once again deployed to Afghanistan in July 2012 and returned home in Feb 2013. This command had two Marines KIA

Marines with CLB-2 first deployed for Special Purpose Marine Air-Ground Task Force Crisis Response-Africa in late 2014 for the 14.2 rotation. This was a 6-month deployment in which CLB-2 acted as the Logistics Combat Element for the SPMAGTF. While overseas, Marines were based in multiple countries throughout Europe and participated in many bi-lateral military training events with partner nations in Europe and Africa.

In addition to providing logistical and command control support during the deployment, CLB-2 filled the combat service support role for the crisis response force in the region.

In the Spring of 2016, CLB-2 once again deployed as the Logistics Combat Element for SPMAGTF-CR-AF 16.1/16.2.

As the LCE, CLB-2 provides logistical support to the SPMAGTF-CR-AF Command Element, currently 8th Marine Regiment, whose posture allows for response across a broad range of military operations in the AFRICOM region. By maintaining the ability to act in permissive and uncertain environments, this crisis response force is able to protect U.S. personnel, property and interests in the AFRICOM and EUCOM areas and provide stability and partnership to these regions.

CLB-2 provides sustained combat service support to a distributed and disaggregated MAGTF. Direct support detachments are task organized and tailored for support at Morón Air Base, Spain; Mihail Kogalniceanu (MK), Romania; and Novo Selo Training Area (NSTA), Bulgaria; while the LCE HQ provides general support to the MAGTF from Naval Air Station Sigonella, Italy.

In addition to providing direct and general combat service support, the LCE is responsible for the command and control of several Theater Security Cooperation (TSC) teams. Through partnership and cooperation, the TSC teams will serve to promote regional stability on the European and African continents. Throughout the 2016 deployment, these TSC teams have worked with militaries from Senegal, Mauritania, Cameroon, Uganda, Ghana, Tunisia, Morocco, Gabon, and others.
