= Richard T. Tryon =

US Marine lieutenant general

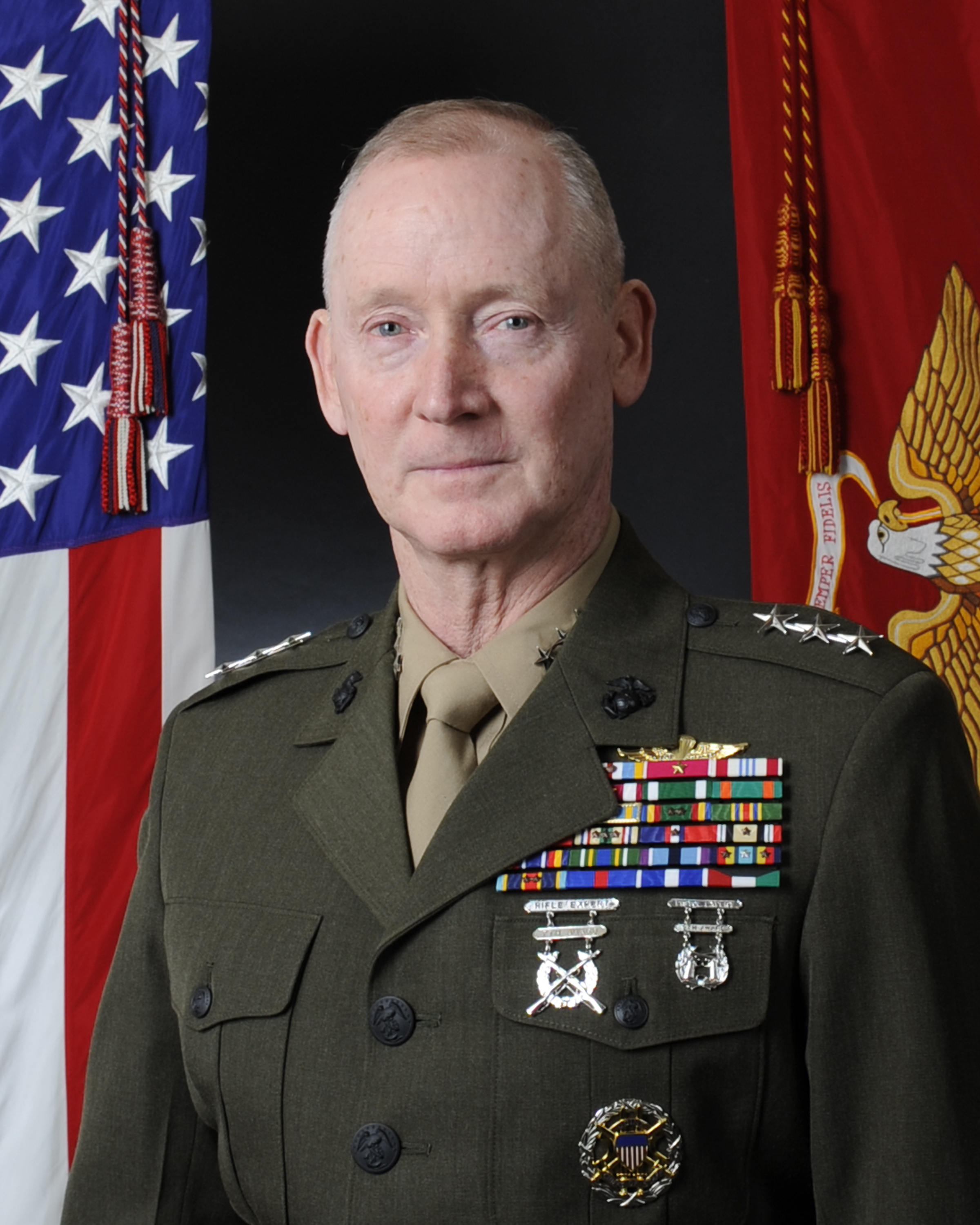
- Official portrait, 2013
- Military career
- Allegiance: United States
- Branch: United States Marine Corps
- Service years: 1970–2014
- Rank: Lieutenant General
- Commands: United States Marine Corps Forces Command; 2nd Marine Division; 24th MEU (SOC); 2nd Battalion, 8th Marines
- Conflicts: Operation Iraqi Freedom
- Awards: Defense Superior Service Medal; Legion of Merit

Richard T. Tryon is a retired U.S. Marine lieutenant general. He previously served as commander of United States Marine Corps Forces Command, 2nd Marine Division and the 24th MEU (SOC).

== Marine Corps career ==
Tryon initially enlisted in the Navy in 1970 and was selected to attend the United States Naval Academy. Upon graduation, he was commissioned a second lieutenant in the Marine Corps in 1975. He graduated from the Basic School and Infantry Officer Course. His first assignment was with the 3rd Battalion, 5th Marines as platoon commander.

He served as Aide-de-Camp to the Commanding General of the 1st Marine Division and completed a tour as the Headquarters Company Commander, 4th Marine Regiment in Okinawa in 1980. From 1981 to 1983 Tryon completed a tour of duty at the Marine Recruiting Station New York, then he attended the Marine Corps Amphibious Warfare School. As a captain, Tyron was assigned to 2nd Battalion, 5th Marines where he served as company commander and operations officer.

He attended the United States Army Command and General Staff College in 1987, concurrently earning a Masters Degree from Webster University. His staff and command assignments include US Special Operations Command, Europe from 1988 to 1991 where he deployed in support of Operations Desert Shield/Desert Storm and Operation Provide Comfort operating in Northern Iraq and Southern Turkey; director of the Special Missions Branch, Special Operations Training Group, II MEF from 1991 to 1993; Commanding Officer of 2nd Battalion, 8th Marines at Marine Corps Base Camp Lejeune from 1993 to 1995; deputy executive assistant to the Vice Chairman of the Joint Chiefs of Staff at the Pentagon and student at Johns Hopkins University School of Advanced International Studies where he received a Master of Arts Degree in International Public Policy in 1998.

Tryon was selected for promotion to colonel in May 1997 and later was assigned as Commanding Officer, 24th MEU (SOC) from 1998 to 2000. His follow on assignment was to Washington D.C. as Commanding Officer, Marine Barracks from 2000 until 2002.

In September 2002, Tryon was selected for promotion to brigadier general. As a general officer, he served as Executive Officer to the Supreme Allied Commander-Europe, United States European Command from 2002 until 2004; Commanding General of Marine Corps Recruit Depot Parris Island and the Eastern Recruiting Region from 2004 to 2006; Commanding General of Marine Corps Recruiting Command from 2006 to 2008; Commanding General of the 2nd Marine Division and II Marine Expeditionary Force (Forward)from June 2008 to July 2010; Deputy Commandant for Plans, Policies and Operations, Headquarters Marine Corps; and Commanding General of United States Marine Corps Forces Command and U.S. Marine Corps Forces Europe.

Tryon retired from active duty in 2014 after 40 years of military service.

== Awards and decorations ==
U.S. military decorations
Defense Superior Service Medal
Legion of Merit with gold award star
Defense Meritorious Service Medal
Meritorious Service Medal with gold award star
Navy and Marine Corps Commendation Medal
Navy and Marine Corps Achievement Medal
U.S. Unit Awards
Joint Meritorious Unit Award with two oak leaf clusters
Navy Unit Commendation with two bronze service stars
Navy Meritorious Unit Commendation
U.S. Service (Campaign) Medals and Service and Training Ribbons
National Defense Service Medal with two bronze service stars
Southwest Asia Service Medal with two bronze service stars
Kosovo Campaign Medal with bronze service star
Iraq Campaign Medal with bronze service stars
Global War on Terrorism Service Medal
Korea Defense Service Medal
Sea Service Deployment Ribbon with silver and two bronze service stars
Overseas Service Ribbon with two bronze service stars
Marine Corps Recruiting Ribbon
Kuwait Liberation Medal (Kuwait)

U.S. badges, patches and tabs
Navy and Marine Corps Parachutist Insignia
Rifle Expert Badge
Pistol Expert Badge
Office of the Joint Chiefs of Staff Identification Badge
