= Richard Huck =

United States Marine Corps general

Richard A. Huck
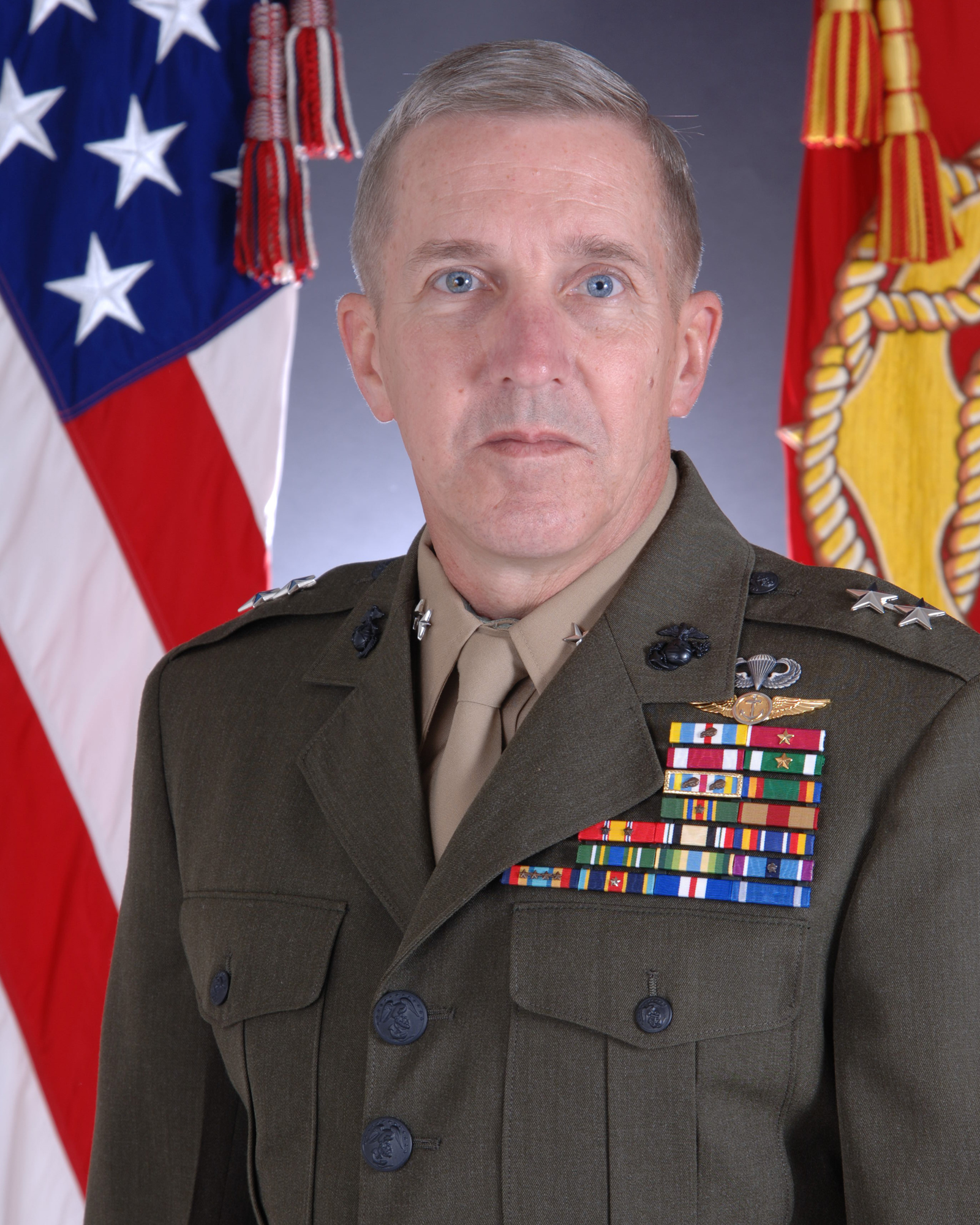
- Huck in May 2006
- Military career
- Allegiance: United States of America
- Branch: United States Marine Corps
- Service years: 1971 - 2006
- Rank: Major General
- Commands: 2nd Marine Division; II Marine Expeditionary Force (FWD)
- Conflicts: Operation Iraqi Freedom
- Awards: Defense Superior Service Medal; Legion of Merit

Richard Huck is a retired United States Marine Corps officer. Huck served as Commanding General of the 2nd Marine Division from 2004 until June 16, 2006. Huck is currently serving as Assistant Deputy Commandant for Plans, Policies and Operations, Headquarters Marine Corps.

== Career ==
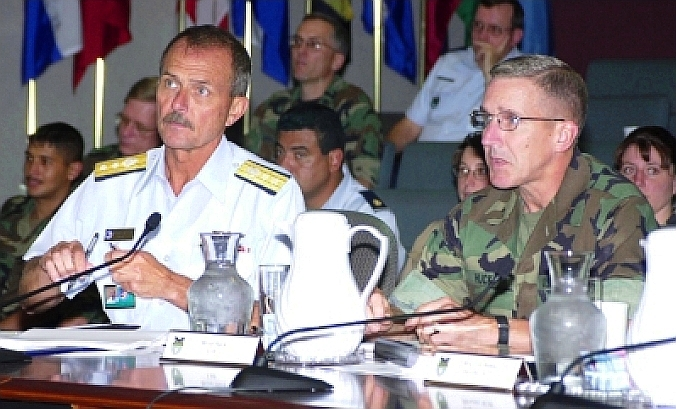
Huck in July 2001, receiving a briefing on the Joint Manpower Resources Offset Process.

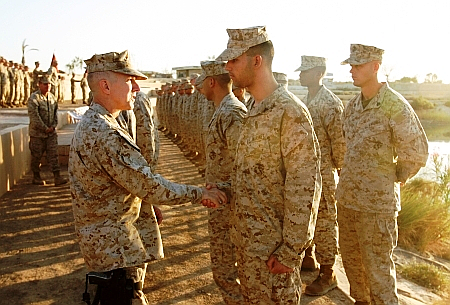
Huck congratulates re-enlisting U.S. Marines from 1st Battalion, 6th Marines, in 2005.

=== Timeline ===
- Huck graduated from Kent State University, and received his commission through the Platoon Leaders Course in 1971.
- 1971-1975, various junior officer positions in the 2nd Marine Division.
- 1975-?, various junior officer positions in the 3rd Marine Division, in Okinawa.
- 1979-1982, Executive Officer Company "D" Marine Security Guard Battalion, Panama.
- 1982-1991, mid-level battalion, regimental, divisional and HQ staff positions.
- 1991-1993, Commanding Officer, 1st Battalion, 6th Marines
- July 1993-June 1995, Commanding Officer, 6th Marine Regiment, 2nd Marine Division.
- 1995-1997, Senior level staff positions in NATO.
- 1997-1999, Military Assistant to the Assistant Commandant of the Marine Corps.
- 1999-2001, Assistant Divisional Commander, 2nd Marine Division.
- 2001-2003, Chief of Staff, United States Southern Command.
- 2003-2004, Director, Personnel Management Division, Manpower and Reserve Affairs, Headquarters, U.S. Marine Corps.
- 2004-2006, Commanding General, 2nd Marine Division.
- 2006, also Commanding General, II Marine Expeditionary Force (Forward).

=== Role in the Haditha massacre ===
U.S. Marine Corps Commandant Michael Hagee visited Iraq following Time magazine's report of an atrocity in Haditha. Time reported that a squad of U.S. Marines from the 2nd Regiment, 2nd Marine Division had reacted to a colleague's death from a hidden land mine by killing 24 unarmed civilians.

The unit involved was more specifically 3rd Battalion, 1st Marines, normally assigned to the 1st Marine Division, however, at the time of the incident they had been temporarily attached to 2nd Marine Regiment, 2nd Marine Division to strengthen the ongoing Marine operations in theater. In being assigned as such, they fell under the command of Huck. U.S. Army Lieutenant General Peter W. Chiarelli, the second-in-command in Iraq, directed an inquiry into failures of leadership in the Marine command structure.

The Los Angeles Times reported, on July 9, 2006, that Huck retired from the Marine Corps on June 19, 2006. As of June 2006, Huck is serving as Assistant Deputy Commandant for Plans, Policies and Operations, Headquarters Marine Corps.

=== Role in the Ilario Pantano shooting incident ===
Lieutenant Ilario Pantano was a platoon commander in 2nd Battalion, 2nd Marine Regiment, 1st Marine Division. In April 2004 the Marines launched their first assault on the city of Fallujah. The assault was planned and conducted by military commanders after insurgent activity had been growing in that city for months. The climax of the enemy activity just prior to the assault was the ambush, burning and desecration of four American "private military contractors" from Blackwater Security, by an angry mob fueled by insurgents.

It was during this period of heightened enemy activity that Pantano and his Marines were dispatched to a housing compound to search for a bomb workshop. After arriving at the compound, a weapons cache and a vehicle with bomb compartments were found at the reported location along with two military age males. It was these two unarmed Iraqi detainees that Pantano shot under unclear circumstances. The shooting was found to be justified at the time and the incident was closed. Five months later, Pantano's chain of command was notified of an accusation by a Marine that had been demoted by Pantano and the matter was forwarded to the Naval Criminal Investigative Service (NCIS) for further investigation. Pantano acknowledge that he shot the captured Iraqis with four dozen bullets, because he wanted "to send a message" after the detainees had refused repeated commands to stop moving toward him. After the shooting, Pantano scrawled a warning which he placed on the vehicle near the bodies. He removed the sign shortly thereafter.

At the conclusion of the NCIS investigation, Pantano was found not guilty of the charges of premeditated murder. The initial investigation began while Pantano's unit was under the command of the 1st Marine Division - a temporary command relationship relating to troop rotation cycles. However, by the NCIS investigation's conclusion, 2nd Battalion 2nd Marines had reverted to the 2d Marine Division - its permanent home. Of significance, by the time the NCIS investigation was concluded, the second assault and seizure of Fallujah had already occurred in November 2004. This now presented an opportunity to return to the scene of the incident, gather any additional evidence and locate additional Iraqi witnesses; as well as exhume the corpses for forensic examination. This was an opportunity NCIS had not been able to execute freely as the area had been under insurgent control during their inquiry. Huck then appointed major Mark Winn, as the command investigating officer, to conduct an additional investigation as per the Manual of the Judge Advocate General, otherwise known as a "JAGMAN". As per the manual, Winn's findings would include recommendations whether Pantano's case should be referred to a court martial based on the NCIS investigation and any additional factual evidence encountered during this inquiry. Winn recommended that the murder charges be dropped, because he did not find the prosecution's key witness credible. But he also recommended that Pantano be held responsible for the sign he left on the vehicle. After reviewing the evidence gathered by all the investigations, Major General Huck dropped the murder charge and did not accept the recommendation to administratively discipline Pantano.

== Awards and decorations ==
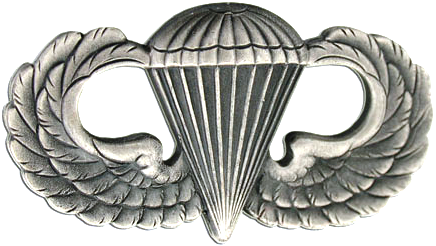

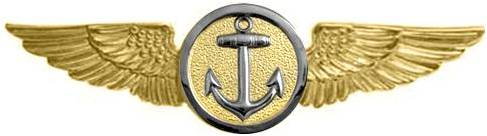

Basic Parachutist Insignia; Naval Aviation Observer Badge
1st Row		Defense Superior Service Medal w/ 1 oak leaf cluster	Legion of Merit w/ 1 award star	
2nd Row	Meritorious Service Medal	Navy and Marine Corps Commendation Medal w/ 1 award star	Joint Meritorious Unit Award w/ 2 oak leaf clusters	Navy Unit Commendation
3rd Row	Navy Meritorious Unit Commendation w/ 1 service star	Marine Corps Expeditionary Medal	National Defense Service Medal w/ 2 service stars	Iraq Campaign Medal
4th Row	Global War on Terrorism Service Medal	Korea Defense Service Medal	Armed Forces Service Medal	Humanitarian Service Medal w/ 1 service star
5th Row	Navy Sea Service Deployment Ribbon w/ 4 service stars	Navy & Marine Corps Overseas Service Ribbon w/ 5 service stars	Marine Corps Security Guard Ribbon	NATO Medal
