= Darvishan =

Town in Helmand Province, Afghanistan

- Village
- Country: Afghanistan
- Province: Helmand Province
- District: Garmser District
- Time zone: UTC+4:30 (Afghanistan Standard Time)

Darvishan (Pashto: دروېشان) is a town in the southern province of Helmand in Afghanistan.

In January 2010, Darvishan was the theatre of Taliban fanned violent anti-American demonstrations, following rumors of a desecration of the Qur'an in a U.S.-led military operation and maltreatment of women in the village of Barcha, about 6 miles south of Darvishan, during a raid to detain insurgents.

U.S. military officials denied the rumors, but protests turned deadly before U.S. and Afghan officials met with community and tribal elders to defuse tensions, and security forces discouraged potential demonstrators from entering the town.

U.S. Marines from 2nd battalion 2nd Marines Easy company were pelted with rocks and sprayed with gunfire in Darvishan as Taliban-led rioting roiled the town. One Afghan gunman was killed by a Marine sniper.

Rioting with gunfire and stone-throwing began in Darvishan when hundreds of demonstrators converged on an Afghan security force facility. This lasted about four hours. A number of trucks were set on fire, shops were looted and a school was set ablaze.

The allegations of desecrating the Qur'an stemmed from an operation of U.S. Army and Afghan forces which raided a compound to detain suspected Taliban insurgents.

== See also ==
- Qur'an desecration controversy of 2005
- Battle of Garmsir
- Helmand Province
