= Ilario Pantano =

Former United States Marine Corps second lieutenant

Ilario Gregory Pantano
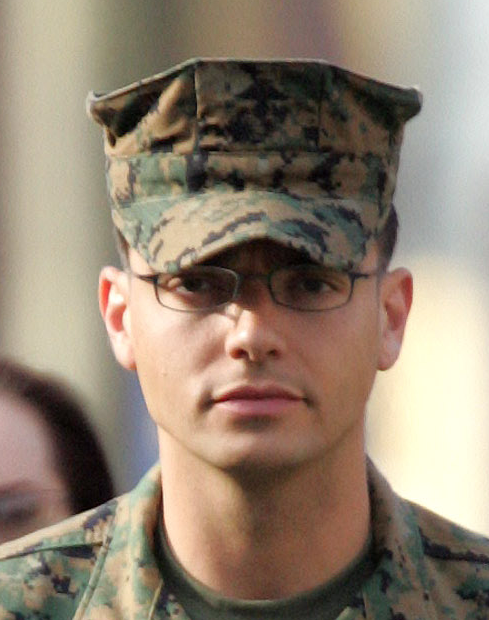
- Born: August 28, 1971 (age 55); New York City, U.S.
- Military career
- Allegiance: United States of America
- Branch: United States Marine Corps
- Service years: 1989–1993; 2003–2005
- Rank: Second Lieutenant
- Units: 1st Battalion, 6th Marines; 2nd Battalion, 2nd Marines
- Conflicts: Persian Gulf War: Operation Desert Storm; Operation Provide Promise; Iraq War: Operation Iraqi Freedom
- Awards: Combat Action Ribbon with gold star (second award)
- Other work: Deputy sheriff

Ilario Gregory Pantano (born August 28, 1971) is a former United States Marine Corps second lieutenant. He has also been an author, a television commentator, and served as a deputy sheriff in Wilmington, North Carolina. He was a Republican Party nominee for the US House of Representatives in 2010.

Pantano served in the Persian Gulf War, during Operation Desert Storm, and in the Iraq War, during Operation Iraqi Freedom. He came to national attention when he was accused of premeditated murder in the killing of two Iraqi captives, during a unit mission near Fallujah, Iraq on April 15, 2004. An article 32 hearing found no credible evidence or testimony for the accusation and declined to prosecute Pantano, dropping all charges. Claiming terrorist threats against his family, he resigned his officer's commission and was honorably discharged. These events and his other experiences as a combat Marine during the Persian Gulf War and in Iraq in 2004 are the subject of his memoir, Warlord: No Better Friend, No Worse Enemy.

== Early life, education and business career ==
Pantano was born in New York City and grew up in the Hell's Kitchen neighborhood of Manhattan. His father, Benito, was an Italian immigrant, and his mother, Merry, a literary agent, is a native of Salina, Kansas. He attended the private Horace Mann High School in New York City on scholarship. Following graduation he enlisted in the United States Marine Corps and served active duty in the first Gulf War.

Following his return to civilian life, Pantano earned an economics degree from New York University. He worked as an energy trader for Goldman Sachs. From 1995 to 1998, he was a member of the start-up team that integrated top-tier investment bank culture (GS) with utility business (BG&E) in Constellation Power, an electricity trading joint venture that was acquired for $11 billion by FPL. Shortly thereafter, he became a movie producer with the New York-based firm The Shooting Gallery, and co-founded Filter Media, a company specializing in interactive television. Pantano married Jill Chapman, a fashion model and entrepreneur who had appeared in Vogue Italia. The couple live in North Carolina and have two sons.

== Military service and controversy ==
=== First enlistment ===
Pantano served in the U. S. Marine Corps during the Persian Gulf War as a TOW gunner. Pantano completed Scout Sniper training, and was promoted to Sergeant, remaining in the Marine Corps until 1993.

=== Rejoins the USMC ===
Immediately following the September 11 attacks, Pantano decided to rejoin the Marines. Pantano's apartment was next to a fire station where eleven firemen, four of whom were former Marines, perished in the attacks. He was accepted to Officer Candidate School and was commissioned as a Second Lieutenant upon completion.

He was a popular officer and his superiors described him as the best platoon commander in his battalion. His men reported that they appreciated the extra training drills he put them through. As Time Magazine reported in 2005, "Pantano prepared his platoon by working the men hard. His men grumbled (enlisted men call officers like Pantano "motarded"—motivated to the point of retardation). But he believed that the more they trained, the fitter they were, the more chance they had of surviving a real war. The effort paid off. In more than 40 combat operations, the platoon suffered one casualty—a shrapnel nick from an incoming mortar round. Then the insurgency erupted. Newly arrived units took more casualties in a few days than their predecessors had in eight months."

Pantano went to Iraq in February 2004 with 2nd Battalion, 2nd Marines. This was quickly followed by the intense fighting in Fallujah during Operation Vigilant Resolve in April 2004.

=== Incident, hearing and aftermath ===
On April 15, 2004, acting on intelligence extracted from captured insurgents, Lieutenant Pantano led his platoon against a compound near the town of Mahmudiyah. As the platoon approached the compound, they saw a vehicle with two Iraqis in it. Pantano ordered his men to stop the vehicle and to have the occupants of the vehicle handcuffed. The vehicle was searched for weapons. Pantano remained with the captives, while the rest of his platoon secured the compound. The compound was deserted, but his men found a cache of arms, including "several mortar aiming stakes, a flare gun, three AK47 rifles, 10 AK magazines with assault vests and IED making material".

When Pantano learned that the compound contained weapons, he ordered Sergeant Daniel Coburn and Corpsman George Gobles to watch for enemies. He then released the captives from their bonds so they could search the vehicle again more thoroughly. According to a statement Lieutenant Pantano made to military investigators in June 2004, he then used hand signals to order the captives to search the vehicle again. According to Pantano, during the search of the vehicle he felt the Iraqis posed a threat to him. They were talking and Pantano believed they were conspiring together. When they both turned to face each other he shouted "Stop!" in both Arabic and English, and when they did not stop, he shot them. He later stated: "I then changed magazines and continued to fire until the second magazine was empty...I had made a decision that when I was firing I was going to send a message to these Iraqis and others that when we say, 'No better friend, No worse enemy,' we mean it. I had fired both magazines into the men, hitting them with about 80 percent of my rounds."

In June 2004, Sergeant Coburn, whom Pantano had previously demoted, registered a complaint about the incident, triggering a Naval Criminal Investigative Service probe. On February 1, 2005, Pantano was charged with two counts of premeditated murder, and faced the death penalty if convicted.

On April 14, 2005, Pantano tried to waive his right to an Article 32 pretrial hearing, in an effort to speed the process toward a court martial. Pantano claimed that the government was withholding key evidence and witnesses and according to a statement made by his mother, waived his right to a hearing "in order to get a Military Judge to compel the prosecution to produce witnesses and evidence in his case." The request was denied and the Article 32 hearing was held on April 26, 2005 with Major Mark Winn as the presiding officer.

Prior to Pantano's Article 32 hearing the Department of Defense had maintained that it was impossible to do a post-mortem examination on the corpses of Lieutenant Pantano's captives because they were buried in a cemetery that was in an area that was not under American control. However, shortly before the hearing and a year after the incident itself, the bodies were exhumed. The autopsy report was released the day after the Article 32 recommendation was made and, according to The Washington Times, confirmed Lt. Pantano's testimony that he had shot the men as they approached him.

==== Pantano's statements ====
Pantano acknowledged leaving a sign on a car above the corpses that said, "No better friend, No worse enemy," but then returned to remove it after one of his colleagues called it 'inappropriate'. This phrase is the motto of his Marine Corps battalion, and is promoted by his battalion commander as the combat philosophy of their unit. The slogan is also a popular Marine saying popularized by Lieutenant General James Mattis, then commanding general of the 1st Marine Division. In an interview with the BBC from March 20, 2005, Lieutenant Pantano said, "I'm a New Yorker and 9/11 was a pretty significant event for me, our duty as Marines is, quite frankly, to export violence to the four corners of the globe, to make sure that this doesn't happen again."

==== Witnesses ====
Navy Corpsman George Gobles was present but did not witness the danger Pantano reported, because he was looking outwards, as ordered. He later stated when he turned back he saw the Iraqis trying to run away. Sergeant Coburn is reported to have said "As soon as I turned my back, Lt. Pantano opened [fire] with approximately 45 rounds." Pantano's defense counsels have said they believe that Sergeant Daniel Coburn's account should not be given any credit, because he was disgruntled, having been demoted recently by Pantano.

Coburn gave several interviews to the media after being ordered not to do so by a superior officer. A report by the officer investigating the claims found "a great deal of discrepancies and conflicting testimony given by Sgt. Coburn", and noted that he might have been prompted to make his allegations by his numerous poor performance reports.

In his testimony at Pantano's hearing, Corporal "O" described interviewing the two captives. He described seeing the vehicle being searched by other Marines, including the removal of its seats. He described seeing the corpses of the captives, following the shooting, face down, with the heads and torsos in the vehicle and their knees resting on the ground, as if Pantano shot the captives in the back while they were kneeling facing the vehicle. Corporal "O" described the sight as "weird".

"Sergeant M", a counter intelligence specialist whose full name couldn't be released, testified that when he questioned the two Iraqi men, they lied and said there were no weapons in the house they fled from. Marines found three AK-47 assault rifles with loaded magazines and mortar aiming stakes, in addition to Osama Bin Laden and Saddam Hussein propaganda in the house.

Sergeant M said he believed the men were probably insurgents, and they were not going to be released.

Sergeant M and Petty Officer 3rd Class George Gobles, the Navy corpsman attached to Pantano's platoon, both testified that Pantano was a good leader who frequently made himself available to the Iraqi people.

"He said we should always present ourselves as humanitarians and greet them with smiles on our face," Gobles said. "That was the way he was, and that was the way he taught us to be."

In his closing arguments, Pantano's lawyer argued the following as justification for the killings:

What you have to remember is you can't import civilian standards into a combat situation. This isn't Chicago. This is Iraq, Indian country....

==== Recommendations ====
Major Winn recommended to Major General Richard Huck, commander of Lieutenant Pantano's division, that the murder charges be dropped and Pantano be held to account for desecration of the corpses. It was his assessment that Sergeant Coburn was an uncredible witness.

The officer who conducted last month's hearing, Lt. Col. Mark E. Winn, recommended in a report to General Huck that criminal charges were not warranted, but sharply criticized Lieutenant Pantano's decision to have the car stopped and to focus so closely on the two men to begin with. Colonel Winn recommended nonjudicial discipline, because the sign and the number of rounds fired were in his opinion unwarranted and excessive. Lieutenant Edwards said, however, that General Huck would not issue any nonjudicial punishment.

Pantano's testimony regarding the shooting incident were corroborated by the forensic evidence discovered in the process of exhuming the bodies and the subsequent autopsies.

the spokesman, Second Lt. Barry Edwards, said of the autopsy. "The initial findings corroborated Second Lieutenant Pantano's version of the events." Lieutenant Edwards would not elaborate further on the autopsy results.

Under U.S. military law, the decision as to whether a court-martial should take place lay solely with General Huck, who dropped all charges.

==== Support ====
Pantano received support from internet websites and organizations which specialize in supporting the troops. He received backing from certain talk radio personalities, specifically Michael Savage who spent day after day raising awareness of Pantano's situation and even conducted several interviews with Pantano and his family.

North Carolina's Third District U.S. Representative Walter B. Jones introduced House Resolution 167 which expressed the support of the House of Representatives for Pantano. On February 25, Congressman Jones wrote a letter to President Bush asking for his support for Pantano.

On April 14, 2005, the Association for Los Angeles County Deputy Sheriffs sent a letter to then President Bush endorsing House Resolution 167 in support of Pantano.

1. House Resolution 167 in support of 2LT Ilario Pantano, March 17, 2005.
2. LA Deputy Sheriffs' endorsement of HR 167, April 14, 2005.
3. Congressman Walter Jones' public statement of support, May 5, 2005.
4. Congressman Walter Jones' endorsement of Pantano's memoir, June 6, 2006.

== Autobiography ==
On June 12, 2006, Pantano's autobiographical account of his experiences, Warlord: No Better Friend, No Worse Enemy, was released by Threshold Editions, Mary Matalin's Simon & Schuster imprint. On July 10, 2006, he appeared on The Daily Show to promote the book.

In November 2011, Simon & Schuster released a new edition of Pantano's book, Warlord: Broken by War, Saved by Grace, containing the letter from Mr. Rodriguez.

== Political career ==
=== 2010 congressional campaign ===
According to the Fayetteville Observer Pantano was the first challenger to present a determined challenge to incumbent Mike McIntyre, during his first seven Congressional campaigns.

==== Endorsements ====
- Alaskan governor and vice presidential candidate Sarah Palin
- Former New York mayor Rudy Giuliani.

==== Results ====
US House of Representatives - North Carolina's 7th District Republican Primary Election 2010
Party	Candidate	Votes	%
Republican	Ilario Gregory Pantano	17,177	51.02
Republican	Will Breazeale	11,629	34.54
Republican	Randy Crow	4,862	14.44
Total votes		33,668	100.00

US House of Representatives 7th District General Election 2010
Party	Candidate	Votes	%
Democratic	Mike McIntyre	113,957	53.68
Republican	Ilario Gregory Pantano	98,328	46.32
Total votes		212,285	100.00

=== 2012 congressional campaign ===
On December 15, 2011, Pantano, while appearing on Fox & Friends, announced that he would again challenge incumbent Rep. Mike McIntyre. Redistricting following the 2010 census had made the district more favorable to Republicans. Pantano and a third candidate, Randy Crow, lost the Republican primary to North Carolina legislator David Rouzer, who went on to lose to McIntyre in the general election in November 2012.

=== State government service ===
Pantano was named assistant secretary for the North Carolina State Division of Veterans Affairs in 2013.

== See also ==
- Charles Gittins, Pantano's civilian lawyer.
