= 2nd Battalion, 2nd Marines =

US Marine Corps unit

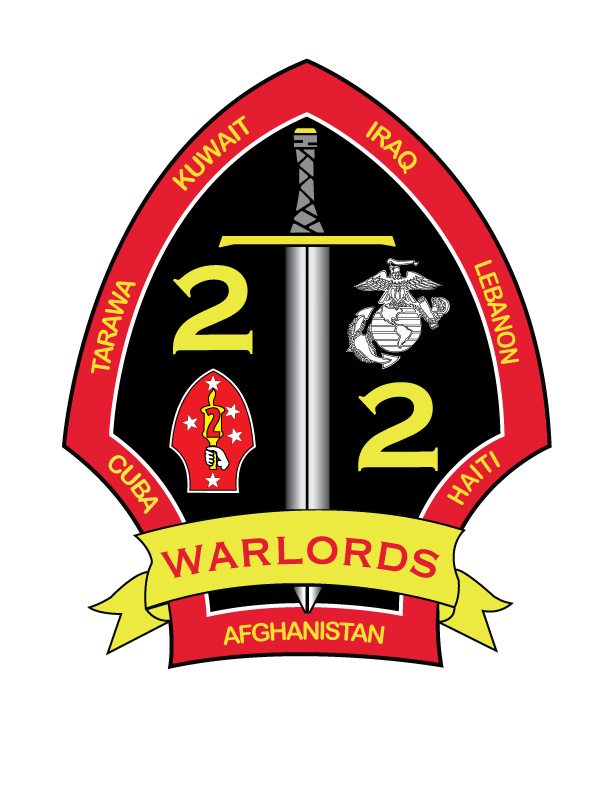
- "The Warlords" 2nd Battalion, 2nd Marines insignia (Insignia above is being replaced soon by a higher quality, transparent background version of the current file)
- Active: June 1, 1925 – January 1, 1933; Jan 14, 1941 – November 18, 1947; October 20, 1949 – present
- Country: United States
- Branch: United States Marine Corps
- Type: Infantry battalion
- Role: Locate, close with and destroy the enemy by fire and maneuver
- Size: 1,000
- Part of: 2nd Marine Regiment
- Garrison/HQ: Marine Corps Base Camp Lejeune
- Nickname: "Warlords"
- Mascot: The Punisher Skull (allegedly used by Easy Company in the 2009-2010 Helmand province deployment as a patch)
- Engagements: World War II: Battle of Guadalcanal; Battle of Tarawa; Battle of Saipan; Battle of Tinian; Battle of Okinawa; Operation Desert Storm; War on terror: Operation Iraqi Freedom; First Battle of Fallujah; Operation Enduring Freedom

Commanders
- Current commander: LtCol Adam S. Young
- Notable commanders: LtCol Giles Kyser

2nd Battalion, 2nd Marines (2/2) is a light infantry battalion in the United States Marine Corps based out of Marine Corps Base Camp Lejeune, North Carolina. Also known as "The Warlords", it consists of approximately 1,000 marines and sailors and normally falls under the command of the 2nd Marine Regiment and the 2nd Marine Division.

The battalion returned home November 2008 from Iraq, returned from Afghanistan in May 2010, returned home March 2012 after deploying for 11 months with the 22d Marine Expeditionary Unit as Battalion Landing Team 2/2 supporting NATO Operation UNIFIED PROTECTOR. The unit then deployed in April 2013, in support of both BSRF and Operation Enduring Freedom. Fox Company returned again from Afghanistan October 2013, while the rest of the battalion returned home August 2013 from the Black Sea Rotational Force. Then again in August 2014, the battalion deployed in support of the SPMAGTF-CR Africa. Returning in January 2015, the unit next deployed to the Pacific region on a UDP, going to Okinawa, Japan; the Philippines; Korea; Thailand; and Singapore.

== Subordinate units ==
- Headquarters & Services Company
- Easy Company (Retains former phonetic designation)
- Fox Company
- Golf Company "Raiders"
- Weapons Company

== History ==
=== Early years and World War II ===
The Second Battalion, Second Marines was activated at Cap-Haitien, Haiti, on July 1, 1925, and assigned to 1st Brigade serving at the time with Garde d’Haiti. Throughout 1925 and 1926, marines of the battalion were employed to quell political disturbances in Haiti. During the period 1929 through 1933, the battalion assisted in building roads and schools, improving sanitary conditions and training the native Haitian constabulary. Second Battalion was deactivated on January 1, 1933.

Second Battalion was reactivated on January 14, 1941. On August 9, 1942, the Battle of Guadalcanal began with Marines landing on the Tulagi Island Complex. On October 10, elements of the 2nd Battalion conducted a two-day raid on the villages of Koilotamaria and Garabaus. During January 1943, 2nd Battalion participated in the final assault to clear Guadalcanal of the remaining Japanese resistance. For its participation in the battle, it was awarded the Presidential Unit Citation.

As part of the 2nd Marine Division, 2/2 deployed and was one of three battalions spearheading the attack on Tarawa (along with the 3rd Battalion, 2nd Marines and the 2nd Battalion, 8th Marines). The Japanese resistance was fierce, and the initial losses to the battalion were heavy. The battalion commander, Lt. Col. Herbert R. Amey Jr., was killed by Japanese machine gun fire before reaching the beach. Throughout the battle, marines of the battalion distinguished themselves: there were two Navy Cross recipients and numerous lesser medals awarded for individual actions. The battalion was again awarded the Presidential Unit Citation for its heroic assault at Tarawa. The 2nd Battalion conducted similar operations during Saipan, Tinian and Okinawa campaigns.

In September 1945, the battalion deployed to Nagasaki, Japan as part of the U.S. occupation forces. During June and July 1946, the battalion relocated to Camp Lejeune as part of the post-war reduction of forces. The battalion was deactivated on November 18, 1947.

=== Post-war years ===
With the birth of NATO, the Marine Corps was assigned a new mission and 2/2 was reactivated October 20, 1949. Since its reactivation, the battalion has seen extensive service in joint and combined operations and exercises.

On July 15, 1958, as part of Landing Force Sixth Fleet, 2/2 landed in Beirut, Lebanon, in order to secure Beirut International Airport. Having accomplished its mission, the battalion redeployed on August 14, 1958. In October 1962, during the Cuban Missile Crisis, the 2nd Battalion deployed to the waters off the coast of Cuba as part of a task force of 40 ships and 20,000 marines and sailors. When the successful blockade terminated on December 3, 1962, the battalion returned to Camp Lejeune.

Service in the Mediterranean, the Caribbean, and Okinawa was routine for the 2nd Battalion during the intervening years between 1963 and 1977. On its assignment as a Battalion Landing Team (BLT) in the Mediterranean Sea in 1976, the battalion played a supporting role in Operation Fluid Drive in the rescue of 276 civilians (110 Americans, 60 Britons, and 106 nationals from other countries) from Beirut on June 20, 1976. In February 1979, elements of the battalion (U.S. Air Alert Force) deployed to the Azores on standby alert to reinforce the American embassy in Tehran, Iran. The unit was recalled when dissidents evacuated the embassy. On December 4, 1979, in the face of terrorist attacks on United States citizens at the Naval Station, Roosevelt Roads, Puerto Rico, they deployed to reinforce the Marine barracks. They were withdrawn in April 1980.

=== Gulf War and the 1990s ===
The 1980s were a decade of standard deployments to the four corners of the world. In December 1990, attached to 6th Marine Regiment, the unit deployed to southwest Asia for participation in Operation Desert Shield and Operation Desert Storm. The battalion returned from southwest Asia in April 1991.

In May 1992, as part of Landing Force Sixth Fleet, 2nd Battalion supported Operation Provide Promise off the coast of the former republics of Yugoslavia. In August 1994, the battalion departed for the Caribbean and Haitian waters for Operation Support Democracy of DaFont. 2nd Battalion, 2nd Marines once again landed in Cap-Haitian on September 20, 1994. Participation in Operation Uphold Democracy lasted until October 1994. A squad from Echo Company engaged in a fire fight with the Haitian police/ military coup. Fourteen marines led by Lt. Polumbo where engaged and prevailed despite superior numbers and superior cover by the Haitians. One Navy interpreter was wounded, and several Haitians died.

In April 1996, 2/2 was attached to the 22nd Marine Expeditionary Unit and simultaneously reinforced an American embassy in Monrovia, Liberia, in support of Operation Assured Response and the American embassy in Bangui, Central African Republic, in support of Operation Quick Response. During February 1997, elements of the battalion conducted migrant operations in Guantanamo Bay, Cuba, in support of Operation Present Heaven. While attached to the 22nd Marine Expeditionary Unit in August 1998, elements of the battalion, participating in Operation Security Force, reinforced the American housing complex in Tirana, Albania, for 97 days. Upon return from deployment in December 1998, Echo Company was sent to Panama for security and contingency operations in support of USCINCSOUTH from March to May 1999.

In January 2000, 2/2 was attached to the 26th Marine Expeditionary Unit for deployment in July. While deployed, the battalion participated in exercises in Tunisia, Turkey, and Croatia.

=== Global war on terrorism ===
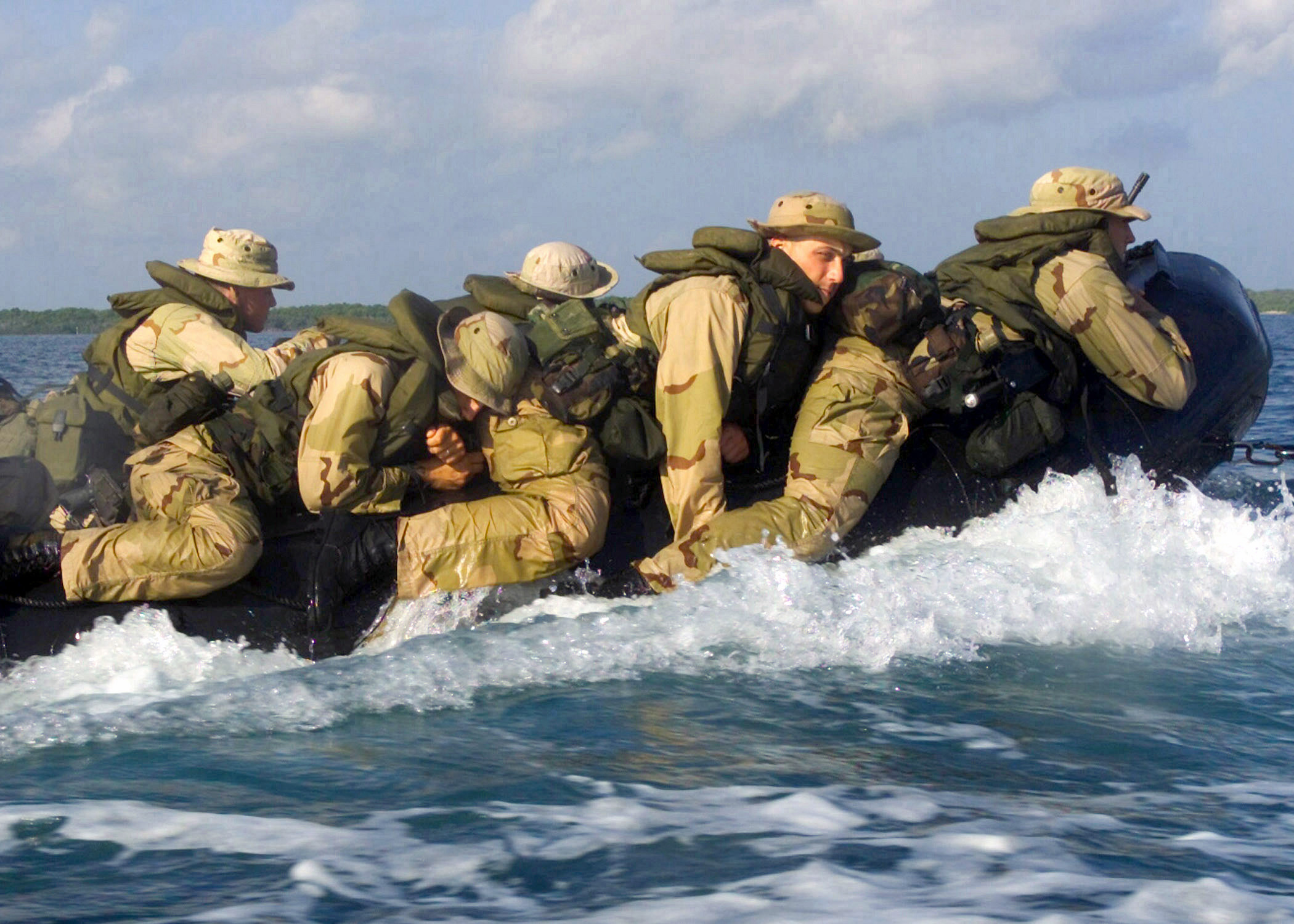
Marines from BLT 2/2 race ashore in a CRRC during Exercise Edged Mallet 2003 in December 2002.

In January 2002, 2nd Battalion, 2nd Marines formed as the battalion landing team for the 24th Marine Expeditionary Unit, in preparation for the Landing Force 6th/5th Fleet deployment in August. While deployed, the battalion conducted peacekeeping and border interdiction operations in support KFOR during Operation Dynamic Response in Kosovo. In December 2002, the battalion under the command of Combined Joint Task Force – Horn of Africa conducted security operations in Djibouti, in support of Operation Enduring Freedom. During this time, Echo Company played a vital role in maritime interdiction operations off the coast of Yemen.

While stationed in the Persian Gulf, in March 2003, 2/2 deployed to Iraq to reinforce coalition forces during Operation Iraqi Freedom. Especially notable during this deployment were the events that led to Fox Company's April 10, 2003 recovery of the remains of Sgt. Fernando Padilla-Ramirez, a marine listed as missing during the battle of Al Nasiriyah on March 28, 2003. The battalion returned from Iraq in May 2003. During the winter of 2003, the battalion supported Operation Noble Eagle in the homeland defense as the Quick Reaction Force for the II Marine Expeditionary Force. In the spring of 2004 the battalion was assigned to deploy to Iraq in support of Operation Iraqi Freedom II and was designated as Task Force 2d Battalion, 2d Marines.

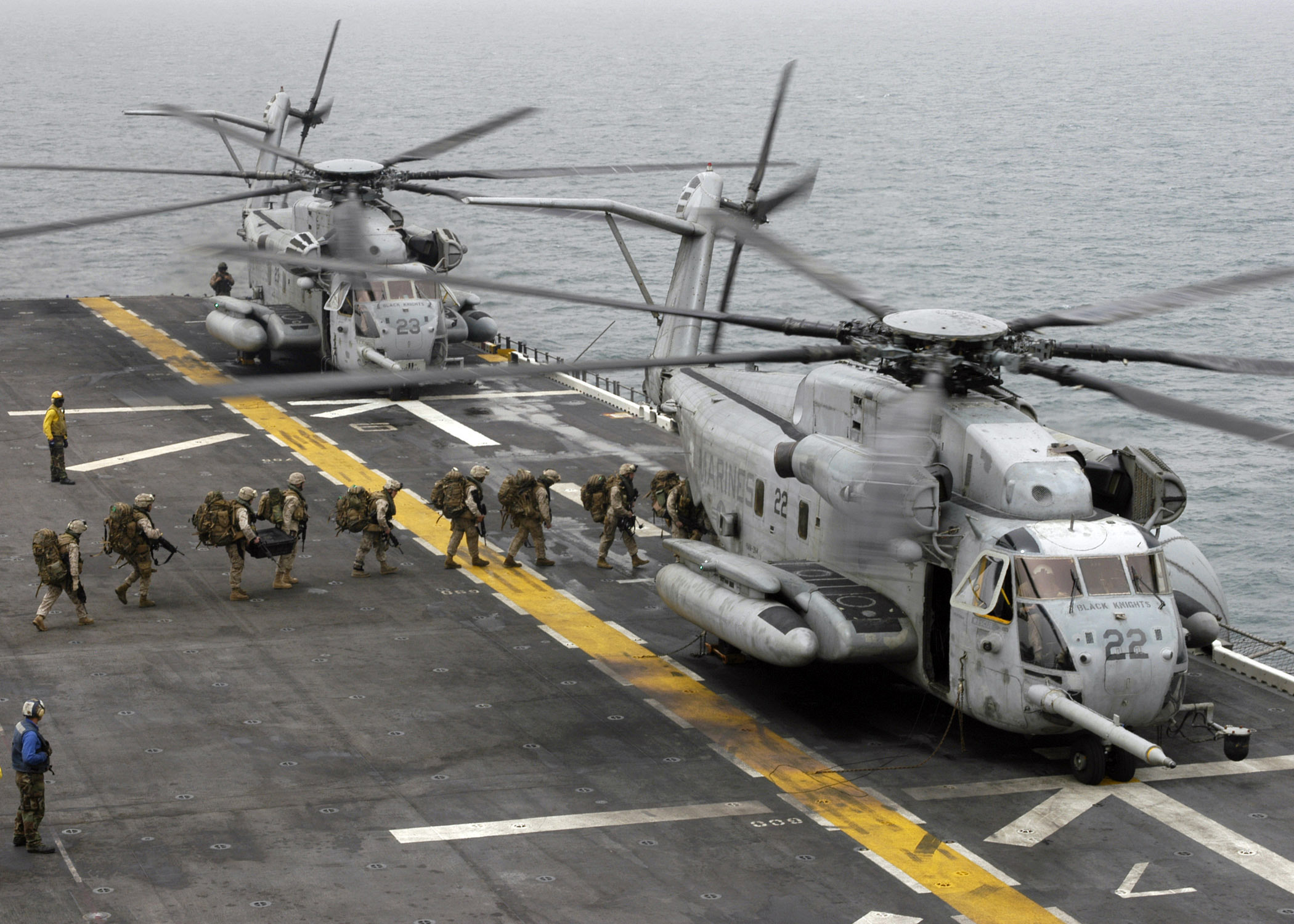
BLT 2/2 marines board a CH-53E Super Stallion aboard the USS Bataan in the Persian Gulf, April 2, 2007.

2nd Battalion, 2dn Marines deployed in March 2004 to Iraq where it was attached to Regimental Combat Team 1, 1st Marine Division and fought in Al Mahmudiya, Al Kharma, the first and second assault in the city of Fallujah, and Al Zadan. Especially notable during this deployment were the events that led to 2ndLt Ilario Pantano being charged with two counts of premeditated murder; Pantano was acquitted of these charges. During this deployment the battalion suffered 154 marines wounded and six killed in action while participating in more than 600 separate engagements of various sizes.

2/2 was deployed to Iraq in July 2005 when it was attached to Regimental Combat Team 8, 2nd Marine Division, II Marine Expeditionary Force. Their area of operations included the areas between Fallujah and Abu Ghraib. They suffered 16 marines killed in action. The Warlords returned home to Camp Lejeune in February 2006. 2/2 was deployed on January 6, 2007, till July 2007 as the BLT of the 26th MEU with the USS Batan amphibious group. 2/2 was deployed again to Iraq in April 2008 when it was attached to Regimental Combat Team 5, 2nd Marine Division, II Marine Expeditionary Force. Their area of operations included the areas between Rawah and Al Qaim and many other sites. The Warlords returned home to Camp Lejeune in November 2008.

In mid-October 2009, 2/2 was deployed to Helmand Province in Afghanistan. They were sent there after undergoing training in the Mojave Desert and in Virginia. During the deployment 2/2 suffered eight marines killed in action. They returned in May 2010 having participated in ISAF-OEF operations in the far south in the vicinity directly north of Safar Bazaar. In March 2011, 2/2 was deployed on a contingency deployment in support of NATO Operation Unified Protector, as part of the 22nd Marine Expeditionary Unit. The Warlords returned home to Camp Lejeune in February 2012 . The 2/2 was deployed for a length of 10 months and conducted numerous bi-lateral training exercises with foreign nations.

In April 2013, the majority of the battalion deployed in support of the Black Sea Rotational Force, while Fox Company conducted combat operations around Nad Ali and surrounding areas in Helmand Province in support of Operation Enduring Freedom returning later that year. In August 2014, the unit deployed in support of the Special Purpose Marine Air-Ground Task Force – Crisis Response – Africa (SP-MAGTF-CR-AF) and the Black Sea Rotational Force. Conducting training with the Spanish, Italian, French, and other NATO members, the unit returned home in January 2015.

In February 2016, 2/2 deployed as part of the Unit Deployment Program (UDP) based out of Okinawa. The unit traveled to many countries while deployed, conducting bi-lateral training and ensuring peace and balance within the region. The unit returned home August 2016. In August 2017, 2/2 deployed in support of the SP-MAGTF-CR-AF, Marine Rotational Force-Europe, and the Black Sea Rotational Force, conducting training with Norwegian, Spanish, Italian, and other NATO members. Additionally, 2/2 participated in a large Swedish training exercise, Exercise Aurora 2017. The unit returned home in March 2018.

During the fall of 2018, 2/2 was dispatched in support of Operation Trident Juncture, a joint training operation conducted by NATO in Norway. In August 2019, 2/2 was deployed as part of the UDP of Okinawa, where they traveled to mainland Japan as well as the Philippian islands, and South Korea in order to improve relations and serve as instructors for the local militaries. They returned to Camp Lejeune in February 2020, narrowly avoiding the travel restrictions imposed due to the COVID-19 outbreak.

During the COVID-19 outbreak, the battalion participated in a UDP to Okinawa from February to August 2021, where they forward deployed to Korea and mainland Japan. While in Japan they were the first Marine Corps infantry battalion to participate in a force-on-force exercise against the Japanese Ground Self-Defense Force, where they earned the Meritorious Unit Citation for their efforts abroad.

2/2 deployed again to Okinawa in support of the UDP from August 2023 to February 2024 where the unit conducted training exercises in Okinawa and mainland Japan.

== Awards and honors ==
- Presidential Unit Citation Streamer with one bronze award star
- Navy Unit Commendation Streamer
- Meritorious Unit Commendation Streamer
- Marine Corps Expeditionary Streamer with one bronze campaign star
- American Defense Service Streamer
- Asia Pacific Campaign Streamer with one silver star and one bronze campaign star
- World War II Victory Streamer
- Navy Occupation Service Streamer with "Asia" and "Europe" clasps
- National Defense Service Streamer with two bronze campaign stars
- Armed Forces Expeditionary Streamer with two bronze campaign stars
- Southwest Asia Service Streamer with two bronze campaign stars.

== See also ==
- List of United States Marine Corps battalions
- Organization of the United States Marine Corps
