= 2nd Marine Regiment =

Infantry regiment of the United States Marine Corps

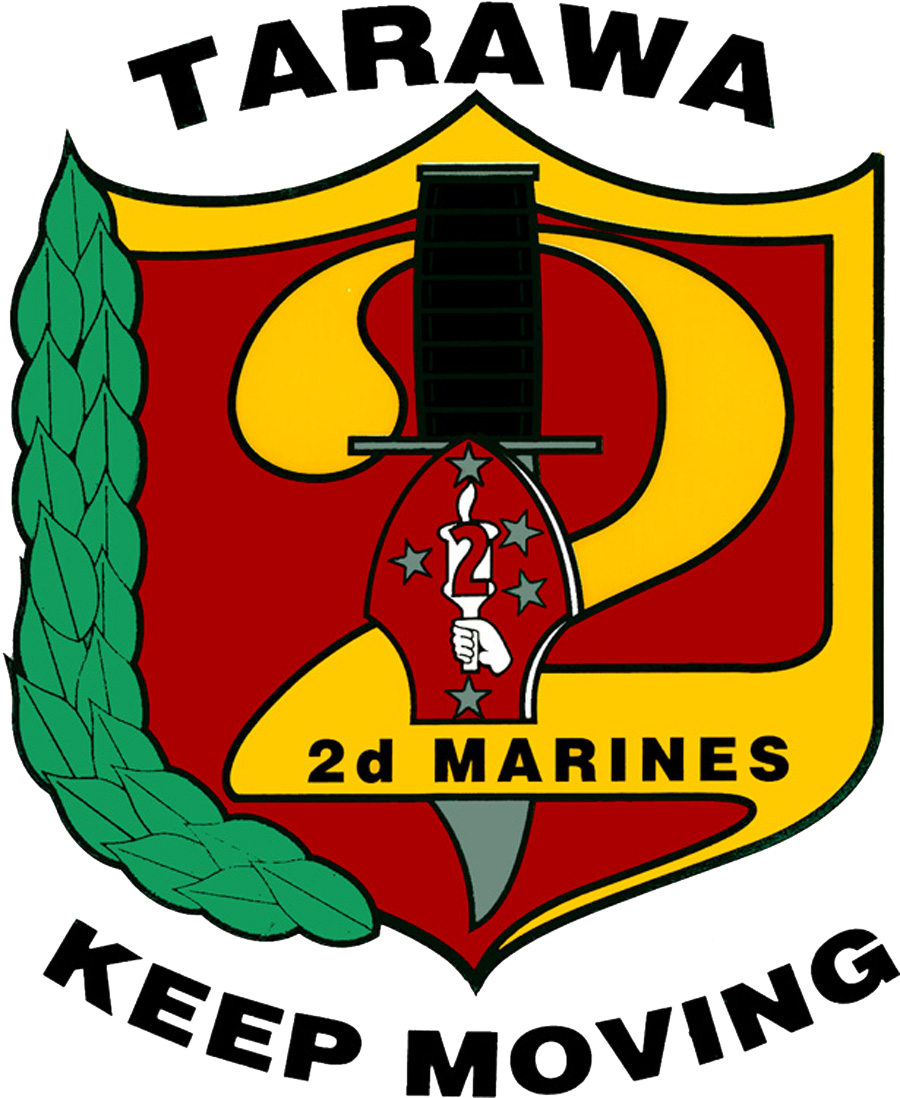
- 2nd Marines Insignia
- Active: 1913 – 34; 1941 – present
- Country: United States of America
- Branch: United States Marine Corps
- Type: Infantry
- Size: Regiment
- Part of: 2nd Marine Division; II Marine Expeditionary Force
- Garrison/HQ: MCB Camp Lejeune
- Nickname: 2nd Marines
- Motto: Keep Moving
- Engagements: Banana Wars; World War II: Battle of Guadalcanal; Battle of Tarawa; Battle of Saipan; Battle of Tinian; Battle of Okinawa; Operation Desert Storm; Operation Restore Hope; War on terror: Operation Iraqi Freedom; Operation Enduring Freedom

Commanders
- Current commander: Col Edward V. Holton
- Notable commanders: William R. Collins; David M. Shoup; William E. Barber; Alfred M. Gray Jr. John W. Ripley; Carl E. Mundy, Jr; John F. Sattler

The 2nd Marine Regiment is an infantry regiment of the United States Marine Corps. They are based at Marine Corps Base Camp Lejeune, North Carolina and fall under the command of the 2nd Marine Division and the II Marine Expeditionary Force.

== Organization ==
The Regiment comprises four infantry battalions and one headquarters company:

- Headquarters Company 2nd Marines (HQ/2nd Marines)
- 1st Battalion, 2nd Marines (1/2nd Marines)
- 2nd Battalion, 2nd Marines (2/2nd Marines)
- 3rd Battalion, 2nd Marines (3/2nd Marines)
- 2nd Battalion, 8th Marines (2/8th Marines)

== History ==
=== Early years ===
The first "2nd Regiment" of Marines came into existence in 1901 when unsettled conditions in the Far East required the presence of a Marine expeditionary force to protect American lives and property. The regiment was formed at Cavite, Philippines, on 1 January, by utilizing personnel for units recently returned to the Philippines from service in the Boxer Rebellion in China, namely, the 1st Regiment and the 4th and 5th Independent Battalions. The 2nd Regiment became part of the 1st Brigade of Marines stationed in the Philippines as a ready force to be committed wherever needed in Far Eastern waters. Following the collapse of Philippine resistance in the Philippine–American War, the 2nd was given an additional mission of helping carry out United States Navy responsibilities for the military government of Cavite Peninsula and the Subic Bay area. The Marines of the regiment established garrisons and outposts and continually patrolled their assigned areas to round up the remaining insurgents and to maintain law and order. In order to execute the regiment's military government responsibilities, officers were appointed to varied special duties such as captains of the ports, district commanders, inspectors of customs, internal revenue collectors, and provost judges and marshals. As the political situation in the Philippines returned to normalcy, drill, practice marches, and general field training. were emphasized to a greater degree. In January 1914, the regiment reassigned most of its units to ships and other stations of the Far East. With the transfer of the Field and Staff (Headquarters) to the Provisional Regiment, Guam, on 20 January, the 2nd Regiment was formally disbanded.

At the same time, a "2nd Regiment" served in the Far East, the 2nd Regiment, 1st Provisional Marine Brigade consisting of a Field and Staff, and Companies A, B, C, F was organized at League Island, Pennsylvania on 26 December 1903. The regiment embarked and sailed this same date to Panama, arriving there on 3 January 1904. The primary mission of this force in Panama was the enforcement of provisions of the Hay–Herrán Treaty made with Panama on 18 November 1903 which provided for the construction of a cross-isthmus canal.

A revolution broke out in Cuba in late 1906, and a Marine expeditionary force was dispatched to the island to establish and maintain law and order. As part of this force, the 4th Expeditionary Battalion was formed at League Island, Pennsylvania, on 27 September 1906. The battalion sailed for Cuba, arriving at Camp Columbia on 8 October. Here, it was reorganized and redesignated 2nd Regiment, 1st Expeditionary Brigade. Order was soon restored, and upon the arrival of United States Army troops as occupation forces on 31 October, the 2nd Regiment was disbanded.

The final one of these temporary "2nd Regiment" organizations to be formed was designated as the 2nd Regiment, 2nd Provisional Brigade on 19 February 1913 at Philadelphia. The regiment was originally intended for duty in Mexico as part of an expeditionary brigade. Instead, it was sent to Guantanamo Bay and held in readiness for emergency duties, while undergoing intensive training. On 1 May, this unit was redesignated 2nd Regiment, Expeditionary Force, USMC.

=== Banana Wars ===
The lineage of the modern 2nd Marine Regiment traces from its activation as the 1st Advance Base Regiment at the Philadelphia Naval Shipyard on 19 June 1913. The following year that designation was changed to 1st Regiment, Advanced Base Force. That unit landed as part of a joint force to secure and occupy the Mexican port of Veracruz in 1914. That brief encounter resulted in two Medal of Honor (MOH) awards to members of the regiment, Wendell C. Neville and Smedley D. Butler. The following year, the regiment was posted to Cap Hatien, Haiti, to safeguard American lives and property. This turned into a long occupation during which the regiment carried out extensive patrolling, engaged in numerous sharp firefights, and trained a native constabulary. The most notable single action was the reduction of Fort Riviere, the most notorious rebel stronghold. Smedley Butler and Daniel Daly were both awarded their second Medals of Honor for valorous actions in Haiti. In 1916, the unit was redesignated 2nd Regiment, 1st Brigade. In 1933, the 2nd Regiment was redesignated the "2nd Marines." The following year, the 2nd Marines departed Haiti then was disestablished on 15 August 1934.

=== World War II ===
The 2nd Marines were reactivated in February 1941 in San Diego, California. This time the regiment was part of the newly formed 2nd Marine Division. The regiment, with the acting division commander and headquarters embarked in USS Crescent City and remaining elements embarked aboard USS President Adams, USS Alhena, USS President Hayes and USS President Jackson, was placed on twenty-four hours alert for sailing effective 24 June with ultimate destination Guadalcanal. The ships sailed combat-loaded and ready for landing operations on arrival from San Diego on 1 July to the South Pacific in July 1942, to reinforce the 1st Marine Division during the Battle of Guadalcanal in 1942–43. On 7 August 1942 and in support of assaults onto Tulagi Island plus the islets of Gavutu and Tanambogo, the 1st Battalion, 2nd Marines landed in two locations onto Florida Island. Finding no Japanese troops, 1st Battalion, 2nd Marines shifted during day to support the 1st Marine Parachute Battalion on Gavutu and Tanambogo. Gavutu and Tanambogo connected to each other via a causeway. An attempted landing by Co. B, 2nd Marines onto the north coast of Tanambogo was unsuccessful. On 8 August 1942, Third Battalion, 2nd Marines plus two tanks of Co. C, 2nd Marine Tank Battalion were landed onto southeast Tanambogo. After hard fighting, Tanambogo secured by nightfall. Gavutu Island also secured on 8 August 1942. Other elements of 2nd Marines secure islets of Makambo, Mbangai and Kokomtambu (all near Tulagi Island) over 7 and 8 August 1942. On 9 August 1942, 2nd Marines headquarters plus attached companies of 2nd Amphibian Tractor Battalion, 2nd Service Battalion and portion of 3rd Battalion, 11th Marines (an artillery unit) taken by retiring naval forces to Espiritu Santo. Via cargo ship USS Alhena, headquarters of 2nd Marines, including Col. J. M. Arthur, landed on Tulagi during 22 August 1942. 2nd Marines later moved to Guadalcanal with elements of 2nd Marines engaged in combat on Guadalcanal from 7 October 1942.

The regiment was awarded a Presidential Unit Citation (PUC) for its actions during the final stages of the battle. This was its first such award.

Following Guadalcanal, the regiment moved to New Zealand for rest and recuperation. The regiment then took part in the bloody assault on Tarawa in November 1943. Commanding officer Colonel David M. Shoup, a future Commandant of the Marine Corps, received the Medal of Honor for his stalwart leadership at Tarawa. This was the only Medal of Honor awarded to a member of the regiment during World War II. The regiment's motto is derived from this battle. The regiment received a second PUC for its demonstrated valor there.

Following Tarawa, the regiment participated in the Battle of Saipan and the Battle of Tinian in 1944. The 2nd Marines acted as a pre-landing deception force at both places before coming ashore to join the main attacks. Once again, the regiment was used as a demonstration force during the Battle of Okinawa in 1945.

After the Surrender of Japan, the regiment took up occupation duties in Nagasaki, Japan that lasted for nine months. The 2nd Marines returned to take up residence at MCB Camp Lejeune, North Carolina, and have remained there as part of the 2nd Marine Division since 1946.

=== Cold War ===
At Camp Lejeune the 2nd Marines' primary mission was to act as a force in readiness. This entailed daily training, participation in annual training exercises, and overseas deployments. Among the continuing contingencies were making annual "Med Cruises" as the Sixth Fleet landing force and intermittent forays into the Caribbean. Elements of the 2nd Marines landed at Beirut in 1958, participated in quarantine operations during the Cuban Missile Crisis in 1962, and stability operations in the Dominican Republic in 1965. The regiment remained stateside throughout the Vietnam War, but was called out when Iraq invaded Kuwait in August 1990. Regimental Landing Team 2 (RLT 2) comprised the ground combat element of the Marine Forces Afloat in the Persian Gulf during Operations Desert Shield and Desert Storm. A rescue team including regimental assets was formed on the spur of the moment to save Americans and other foreign nationals besieged by rebels in Mogadishu, Somalia. As it had during World War II, RLT 2 acted as a diversion force tying Iraqi forces to the coast while the main attack struck inland during the liberation of Kuwait in 1991. One battalion (2/2) was attached to the 6th Marines to breach the infamous Saddam Line then drive north to seal off Kuwait City. 2nd Marines was awarded a Navy Unit Commendation for its actions in Southwest Asia.

=== 1990s ===
The regiment returned home in 1991, then participated in military operations other than war. These included Haitian relief operations at Camp Lejeune in 1992, humanitarian relief and security operations in Somalia (Operation Restore Hope) in 1993, security operations in Bosnia (Operation Provide Promise and Operation Deny Flight) in 1994, humanitarian interventions in Haiti (Operation Support Democracy and Operation Uphold Democracy) in 1994, humanitarian relief for Cuban refugees (Operation Sea Signal) in 1995, and non-combatant evacuation/security operations in Liberia (Operation Assured Response) in 1996.

=== Global war on terrorism ===
Regimental Combat Team 2 comprised the nucleus of Task Force Tarawa during the 2003 invasion of Iraq in the initial stage of Operation Iraqi Freedom in 2003. Its most notable action was the Battle of Nasiriyah to secure a pair of key bridges across the Euphrates River. The fighting there was later dubbed "Ambush Alley" and was the most intense urban warfare seen by the Marine Corps since the Battle of Huế in 1968. Elements of the 2nd Marines also supported the rescue of Army prisoner of war (POW) Jessica Lynch.

Individual battalions of the 2nd Marines have participated in stability and security operations in Iraq and Afghanistan on a seven-month rotating basis. The most notable actions in Iraq occurred in the Sunni stronghold of Al Anbar province during the battles for Fallujah during which the 2nd Battalion 2nd Marines was attached to the 1st Marine Regiment in 2004 to participate in Operation Vigilant Resolve and Operation Phantom Fury. These intense urban fights were reminiscent of the house-to-house fighting required during the Battle of Seoul during the Korean War in 1950 and the Battle of Hue.

The 2nd Marine Regiment deployed to Iraq in January 2005 as part of the 2nd Marine Division in the Al Anbar Province in western Iraq and returned home in March 2006.

2nd Marine Regiment deployed again to Iraq, Al Anbar province, from December 2006 - January 2008. They were mainly stationed at Al Asad but from March - September 2007 sent a majority of its regiment to Camp Korean Village to assume control there as well.

2nd Marine Regiment deployed to Afghanistan to FOB Delaram II, Nimroz Province from February 2010 to February 2011 in support of Operation Enduring Freedom. 2nd Marine Regiment returned to Afghanistan from June 2013 to February 2014, serving as the command element at Camp Leatherneck for RC Southwest.

== See also ==
- History of the United States Marine Corps
- List of United States Marine Corps regiments
