= 1st Battalion, 6th Marines =

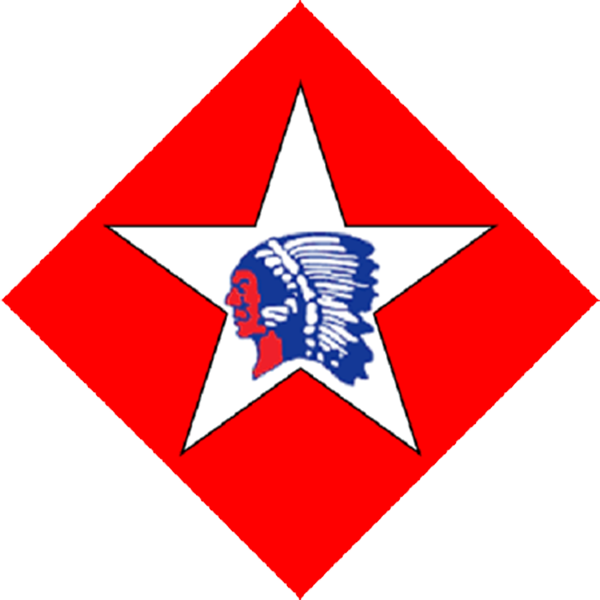
- 1st Battalion, 6th Marines insignia during WWI
- Active: 11 July 1917 – 20 August 1919; 12 June 1922 – 1 October 1925; 29 March 1927 – March 1929; 9 September 1934 – 2 October 1947; 7 October 1949 – present
- Country: United States
- Branch: United States Marine Corps
- Type: Light infantry
- Role: Locate, close with and destroy the enemy by fire and maneuver and close combat.
- Part of: 6th Marine Regiment; 2nd Marine Division; II Marine Expeditionary Force
- Garrison/HQ: Marine Corps Base Camp Lejeune
- Nickname: "Comanche"
- Motto: "1/6 HARD"
- Engagements: World War I; Battle of Belleau Wood; Battle of Soissons; Battle of Blanc Mont Ridge; Meuse-Argonne offensive; World War II; Battle of Guadalcanal; Battle of Tarawa; Battle of Saipan; Battle of Tinian; Battle of Okinawa; Cold War; Cuban Missile Crisis; Operation Just Cause; Persian Gulf War; Yugoslav Wars; Kosovo War; Operation Allied Force; Operation Noble Anvil; Global War on Terrorism; War in Afghanistan; Operation Iraqi Freedom; Operation Odyssey Lightning; Operation Inherent Resolve

Commanders
- Notable commanders: Joseph C. Fegan Jr. Wesley L. Fox; Thomas S. Jones; Richard A. Huck; William M. Jurney; Cal L. Worth, Jr. Gregory P. Gordon

The 1st Battalion, 6th Marines (1/6) is an infantry battalion in the United States Marine Corps based in Camp Lejeune, North Carolina. It consists of approximately 1,100 marines and sailors. They fall under the command of the 6th Marine Regiment, the 2nd Marine Division of the II Marine Expeditionary Force (II MEF).

== Subordinate units ==
- Headquarters and Services Company – "Hawkeye"
- Alpha Company – "Apache"
- Bravo Company – "Black Foot"
- Charlie Company – "Cold Steel"
- Weapons Company – "Warrior"/"Laredo"

== History ==
=== World War I (1917–1919) ===
Activated on 11 July 1917 at Marine Corps Base Quantico, Virginia, as the 1st Battalion, 6th Marine Regiment. 1/6 deployed to France from September to October 1917 and was assigned to the 4th Brigade, 2nd Division (Army), American Expeditionary Force. For the actions at Belleau Wood, Soissons, and Blanc Mont, the 6th Marine Regiment was awarded the French Croix de Guerre three times. As a result, the regiment is authorized to wear the fourragère of the Croix de Guerre (seen in the unit's logo), one of only two units in the Marine Corps so honored, (the other being the 5th Marine Regiment). The fourragère thereafter became part of the uniform of the unit. All members of the modern 6th Marines are authorized to wear the fourragère while serving with the regiment. (World War One Victory Medal, Army Occupation of Germany Medal, French Croix de guerre)

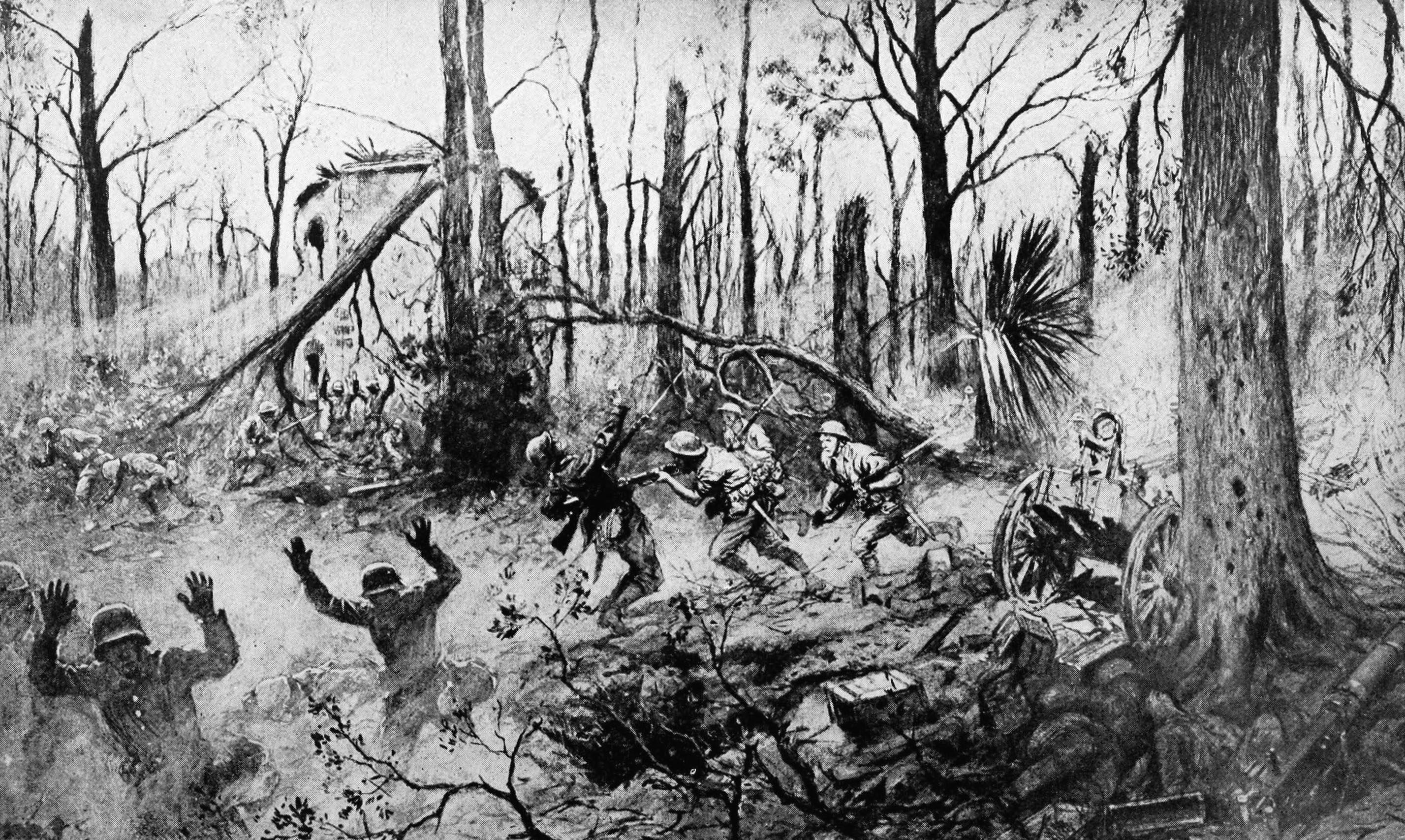
American marines in Belleau Wood (1918)

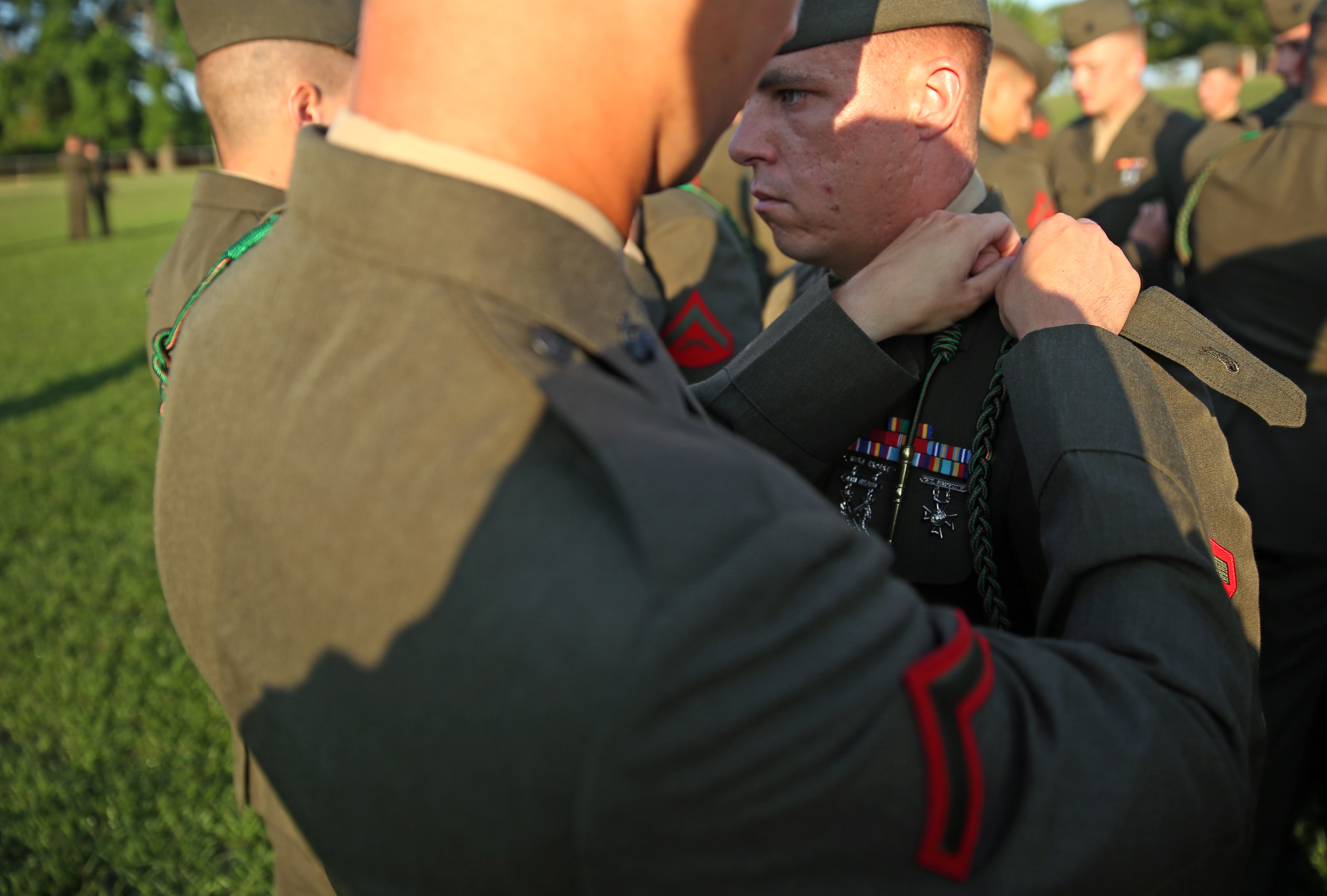
French Fourragere Ceremony

The battalion participated in the following World War I campaigns:

- Aisne
- Aisne-Marne
- St. Mihiel
- Meuse-Argonne

Along with the following defensive campaigns:

- Touln-Troyon
- Chateau-Thierry
- Marabache
- Limey

1/6 participated in the Occupation of the Rhineland from December 1918 to July 1919. After the war the battalion relocated to Quantico, Virginia in August 1919 and was deactivated on 20 August 1919.

=== 1922 – 1934 ===
The battalion was reactivated on 12 June 1922 and participated in maneuvers at Gettysburg, Pennsylvania. From June–July 1922, it was assigned to the Marine Corps Expeditionary Force.

In June 1924 1/6 deployed to the Dominican Republic and Guantanamo Bay, Cuba participating in expeditionary operations until September 1925. The unit returned to Norfolk, Virginia, and was deactivated on 1 October 1925. (Marine Corps Expeditionary Medal)

On 29 March 1927, 1/6 was reactivated in Philadelphia, Pennsylvania, in May 1927, 1/6 deployed to Shanghai, China and was assigned to 3rd Brigade. The battalion was again deactivated in March 1929 in San Diego, California

=== Yangtze River Valley (1934–1938) ===
On 9 September 1934, at Norfolk, Virginia, 1/6 relocated to San Diego during September and October 1934 and then deployed to Shanghai in China in August 1937 where it was assigned to the 2nd Marine Brigade, Fleet Marine Force. The battalion returned to San Diego during February to April 1938. (Yangtze Service Medal, China Service Medal)

=== World War II (1939–1946) ===
On 1 February 1941, the 2nd Marine Brigade was re-designated as the 2nd Marine Division, Fleet Marine Force (FMF). In anticipation of joining the war 1/6 deployed during May to July 1941 to Reykjavík, Iceland and was reassigned to the 1st Provisional Marine Brigade.

1/6 relocated during March 1942 to San Diego and were reassigned to the 2nd Marine Division, FMF. From October to November 1942 it deployed to Wellington in New Zealand. During the course of World War II the battalion fought at Guadalcanal, Tarawa, Saipan, Tinian and Okinawa.

The 6th Marines landed at Guadalcanal on 4 January 1943 where it was briefly reunited with the 2nd and 8th Marines. The 6th Marines, fighting as part of a temporary Army-Marine division after the bulk of the 2nd Marine Division departed, participated in the final American offensive on Guadalcanal advancing from Kokumbona to Cape Esperance and eliminating the last remaining enemy forces. The 6th Marines suffered 223 casualties (53 killed in action or died of wounds, 170 wounded in action), during its six weeks on the "Canal".

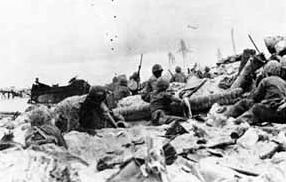
Japanese defenders launched a series of banzai attacks against the dug-in Marines of 1/6 during the tough fighting on the interior of Betio Island 1943

During the Battle of Tarawa, the 6th Marines was the V Amphibious Corps' floating reserve. The assault waves stormed ashore on 20 November 1943 but ran into stiff opposition. Casualties were so heavy that the entire division reserve was committed on the first day. The 6th Marines was ordered ashore the following morning. The 1st and 3rd Battalions landed across Betio's Green Beach and were ordered to drive the length of the island, the 2nd Battalion was used as a blocking force on nearby Bairiki Island. Betio was declared secure after 76 bloody hours. The 1st and 3rd Battalions were re-located to a new rest camp in Hawaii, but the 2nd Battalion stayed on to clear the rest of the atoll. The 6th Marines suffered 355 casualties (99 dead, 256 wounded) and received a Presidential Unit Citation for its actions on Tarawa.

The regiment next participated in the Battle of Saipan and the Tinian operation. The regiment landed under heavy fire at Saipan's Red Beach on 15 June. This was the most difficult assault landing in regimental history; two of the three battalion commanders were seriously wounded in the first minutes ashore. Early the next morning, the 6th Marines repulsed several tank-supported counterattacks that saved the beachhead. Machine gunner PFC Harold G. Epperson sacrificed his own life by diving on a grenade on 25 June and received a posthumous Medal of Honor for that action. The regiment then drove north up the west side of the island through the coastal town of Garapan and on toward Tanapag, where the Marines faced the largest Imperial Japanese Army banzai attack of the war.

The next battle for the regiment was at Tinian on 25 July and joined the rest of the 2nd Marine Division as it elbowed its way down the island until reaching the escarpment that marked Tinian's southern tip on 1 August. It took three days of tough fighting to reduce the final enemy stronghold. During that fighting, PFC Robert L. Wilson covered a live grenade with his body to protect his comrades and earned a posthumous Medal of Honor. The regiment lost 34 killed and 165 wounded in ten days on Tinian.

In September 1945, the unit deployed to Nagasaki where it participated in the Occupation of Japan from September 1945 to June 1946. (Presidential Unit Citation, American Defense Service Medal, European-African-Middle East Campaign Medal, Asiatic-Pacific Campaign Medal, World War II Victory Medal, Navy Occupation Medal)

=== Cold War (1946–1990) ===
In July 1946, 1/6 relocated to Camp Pendleton, California and was reassigned to the 3rd Marine Brigade, FMF. In July 1947, it was reassigned to the 1st Marine Division and deactivated on 1 October 1947. On 7 October 1949 1/6 was reactivated at the Marine Corps Base at Camp Lejeune, North Carolina and was assigned to the 2nd Marine Division. Unit personnel subsequently deployed at various times as the Battalion Landing Team 1/6 in Okinawa, the Mediterranean and the Caribbean.

In 1958, 1/6 participated in Operation Blue Bat during the 1958 Lebanon Crisis.(Marine Corps Expeditionary Medal)

In 1962, 1/6 participated in the Cuban Missile Crisis in October and November 1962 (Marine Corps Expeditionary Medal)

In 1965, 1/6 participated in the Intervention in the Dominican Republic from April to June 1965 in support of Operation Powerpack. (Armed Forces Expeditionary Medal)

On 21 April 1967, a military coup overthrew the elected government of Greece. Navy units were immediately alerted and directed to the Ionian Sea. Two Battalion Landing Teams (BLT 3/8, and BLT 1/6) were in the Mediterranean at the time, because of a turn-over; both were active in the operation, which involved a show of force and a contingency (stand-by) evacuation response.

The Six-Day Arab-Israeli War of June 1967 caused the Marine Amphibious Ready Group (BLT 1/6) to be put on alert for possible operations. On 6 June, two carrier task forces moved closer to the fighting, while four days later, President Johnson ordered a high-speed carrier movement toward Syria to facilitate a cease-fire agreement.

On 1 September 1969, a coup overthrew the Libyan monarchy. At the same time, conditions were very unsettled in Lebanon, leading to the 22 October resignation of the Lebanese Prime Minister. Contingency forces in the period 26–30 October included two carrier task forces and the Mediterranean Amphibious Ready Group (MARG) with BLT 1/6 embarked.

From January to July 1989 elements of Charlie Company 1/6 deployed to Panama with 6th Marine Regiment in support of Operation Just Cause. (Navy Unit Commendation, Armed Forces Expeditionary Medal, Multinational Force and Observers Medal)

(National Defense Service Medals awarded for active duty service during Korean War 27 June 1950 to 27 July 1954 and war Vietnam War 1 January 1961 to 14 August 1974, Navy Unit Commendation awarded 1986–1987, Sea Service Deployment Ribbons Awarded for deployments for a period of either 90 consecutive days or two periods of at least 80 days each within a given 12-month period; or 6 months stationed overseas in a forward deployed location, 15 August 1974– Present)

=== Persian Gulf War (1990–1991) ===
The battalion participated in Operation Desert Shield and Operation Desert Storm in 1991. The battalion was already deployed to Okinawa since July 1990, then on to Saudi Arabia via amphibious ships with the 4th MEB. After extensive training and attaching to the 2nd Marine Division upon their arrival in December, they were ready to fight. The battalion provided valuable information to the Division since they had been in country since September and was pleased to rejoin their higher command, the 6th Marine Regt. The 6th Marines was commanded by Col Lawrence H. "Rhino 6" Livingston, a highly decorated Vietnam Veteran, having earned the Navy Cross, Silver Star, four Bronze stars and five purple hearts respectively. Lt Col Thomas S. Jones, who command 1/6 was a decorated combat veteran of Vietnam himself and had served an exchange tour with the 42 Commando British Royal Marines, was well suited for the task at hand. He was well respected throughout the battalion and the Regiment as well. At 0600 on 24, 1/6 February quickly closed on the first of the obstacle belts which consisted of two minefield and wire obstacles. The Combat Engineer Battalion opened the lanes using the mine clearing line charges and then mine plows as best as they could. Various types of mines were encountered, but were expected. Plastic antipersonnel and antitank mines would slide back into the lanes as the AAVs with infantry Marines inside and the CAAT teams advanced to the objective. Under indirect and direct fire from the enemy, the battalion fought through two mine fields and also had to quickly go to MOPP level 4, responding to the alarm of chemical agent of "mustard gas" detected by the "Fox" chemical reconnaissance vehicle. After the first day of fighting, hundreds of Iraqis on the front line surrendered, many of them had to be "convinced" to give up the fight or die. Along with the Army's Tiger Brigade (Tanks), 1st Battalion, 6th Marines destroyed many enemy tanks, armored personnel carriers, bunkers, and enemy ground troops who did not understand the fact that, Marines take the fight to the enemy, hard and heavy. (Navy Unit Commendation, National Defense Service Medal, Southwest Asian Service, Kuwait Liberation Medal Kuwait, Kuwait Liberation Medal Saudi Arabia)

=== Operation Sea Signal (1994) ===
From July 1994 to October 1994 under Joint Task Force 160, the battalion participated in Operation Sea Signal. This was a humanitarian operation at Guantanamo Bay in the Caribbean in response to an influx of Cuban and Haitian migrants attempting to gain asylum in the United States. (Joint Meritorious Unit Award, Humanitarian Service Medal)

=== Operation Pacific Haven (1996-1997) ===
While on a six-month deployment to Okinawa, Japan elements of 1st Battalion 6th Marines were called upon to support the Ground Combat Element, Marine Component, Joint Task Force (JTF) Pacific Haven on the island of Guam. Operation Pacific Haven was activated in September 1996 to provide humanitarian assistance to over 2,500 Kurds evacuated from Northern Iraq seeking asylum and eventual entry into the United States. From 2 December 1996 to 19 March 1997, Bravo Company 1/6 was assigned to the Tiyan housing area in Guam to provide security and support the overflow of Kurdish evacuees. (Joint Meritorious Unit Award, Humanitarian Service Medal)

=== Operation Allied Force (1999) ===
1st Battalion 6th Marines participated in Operation Noble Anvil in Kosovo from January to April 1999. Also known as the NATO bombing of Yugoslavia (or Operation Allied Force), the bombing killed around 1,000 members of the Yugoslav regime's security forces. It destroyed bridges, industrial plants, barracks and military installations. Throughout the air campaign, 1/6 attached to the 24th Marine Expeditionary Unit was poised in the Aegean and Adriatic Seas to conduct Tactical Recovery of Aircraft and Personnel (TRAP) missions in support of combat operations had U.S. or NATO aircrews required assistance. While in the Aegean, 1/6 participated in humanitarian assistance efforts in Macedonia to assist Kosovar refugees with food, water, shelter and medical aid. (Navy Unit Commendation, Kosovo Campaign Medal, NATO Medal Kosovo)

=== Global war on terrorism (2001–2021) ===
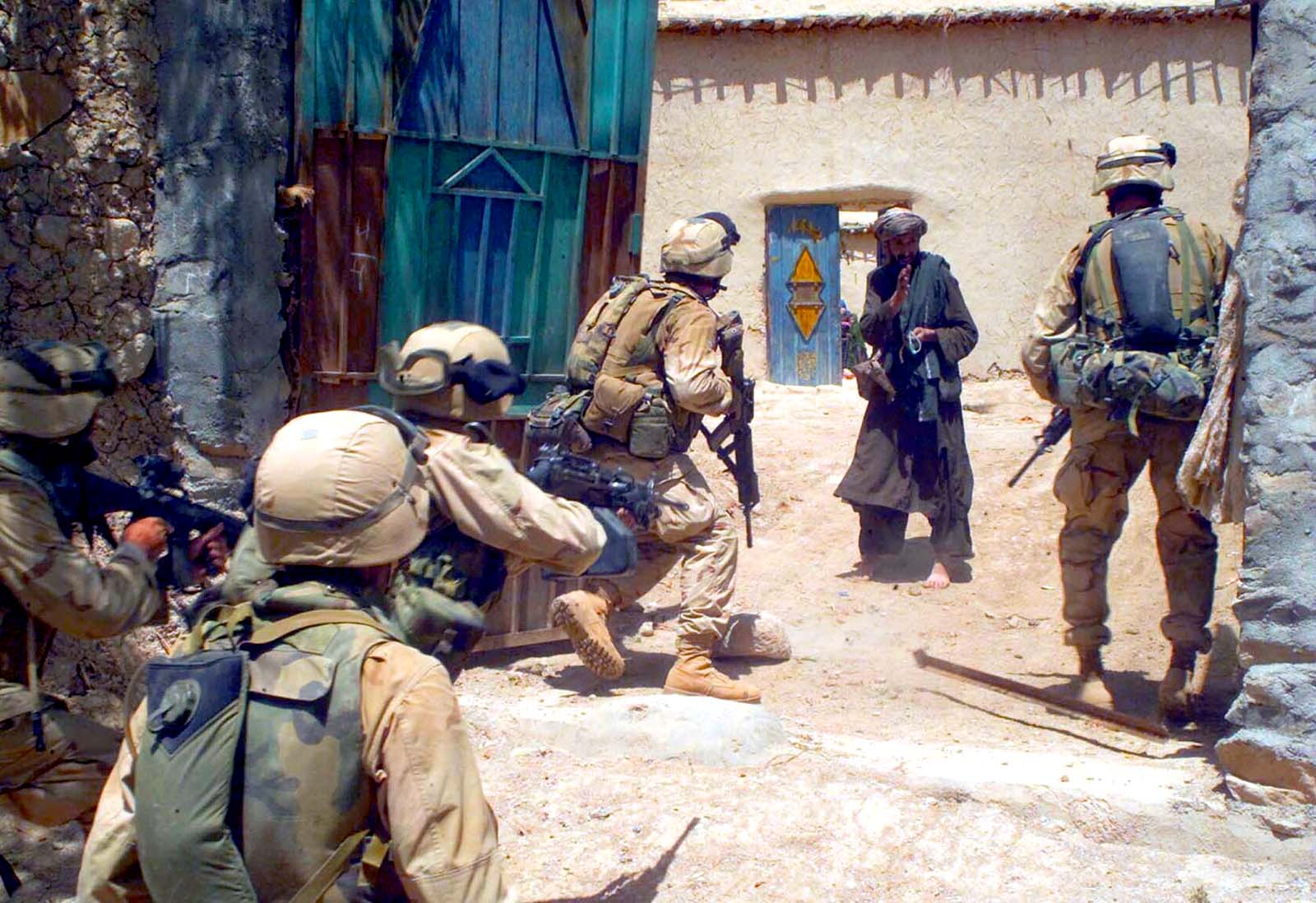
U.S. Marines from Alpha Co., Battalion Landing Team 1st Bn., 6th Marines, startle the owner of a compound who refused to open his door for a search during Operation EL DORADO 2004.

(National Defense Service Medal and Global War on Terrorism Service awarded for active service during Global War on Terrorism from 11 September 2001 to December 31, 2022)

In 2004, Battalion Landing Team 1/6 deployed as the ground combat element of the 22nd Marine Expeditionary Unit (Special Operations Capable) to Oruzgan Province, Afghanistan, in support of Operation Enduring Freedom. Operating as part of Task Force Linebacker, the battalion established forward positions near Tarin Kowt and conducted offensive patrols, cordon-and-search operations, and direct combat against Taliban forces. During Operation Asbury Park, elements of Charlie and Weapons Companies fought entrenched Taliban forces in the Dey Chopan highlands. Across the campaign, the 22nd MEU reported more than 90 Taliban and al-Qaeda fighters killed and 131 persons detained. (Navy Unit Commendation, Afghanistan Campaign Medal, NATO Medal ISAF)

In 2005, 1/6 deployed to northern Fallujah and the surrounding Saqlawiyah area following Operation al-Fajr. The battalion conducted counterinsurgency operations, raids, patrols, weapons searches, and route-security missions while operating alongside Iraqi security forces. During the deployment, 1/6 conducted 17 battalion-level operations, carried out more than 4,000 cordon-and-search actions, and detained more than 450 suspected insurgents. (Iraq Campaign Medal)

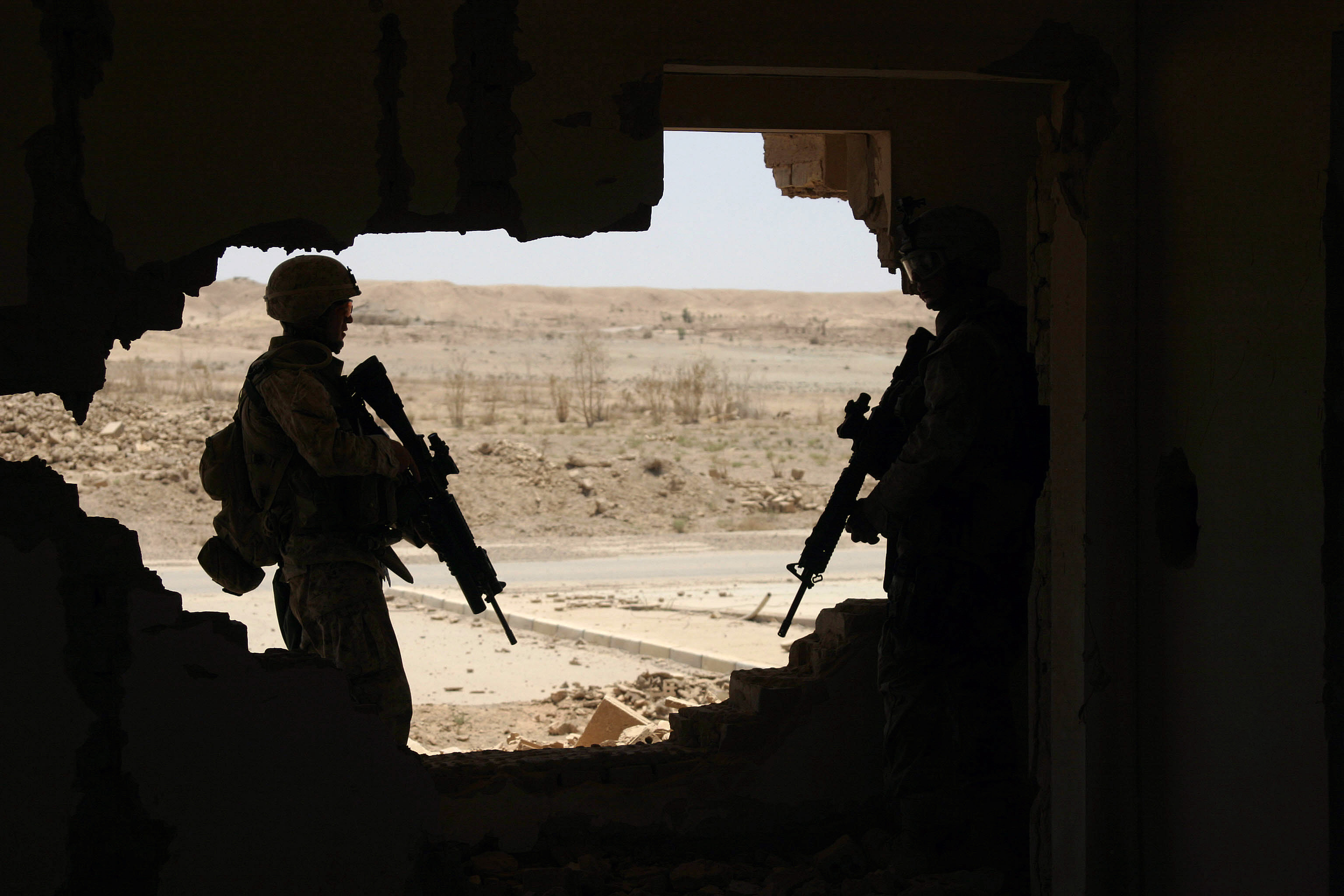
Marines of Bravo Company, 1/6, clear an abandoned house during a weapons sweep in Iraq in June 2005

From September 2006 through May 2007, 1/6 deployed to Ramadi, Iraq, where it served under the United States Army's 1st Brigade Combat Team, 1st Armored Division. Operating from combat outposts inside the city, the battalion defended the provincial Government Center, cleared contested neighborhoods, established joint Marine-Iraqi security stations, and conducted sustained combat operations against Al-Qaeda in Iraq. These operations formed part of the wider campaign to secure Ramadi and supported the improved security conditions associated with the Anbar Awakening. (Navy Unit Commendation, Iraq Campaign Medal)

On 10 August 2007, 1/6 came under the operational control of the 24th Marine Expeditionary Unit and was designated Battalion Landing Team 1/6. Reinforced with reconnaissance, artillery, combat engineer, light armored reconnaissance, and amphibious assault elements, the battalion spent the following six months conducting predeployment training for the MEU's scheduled 2008 deployment.

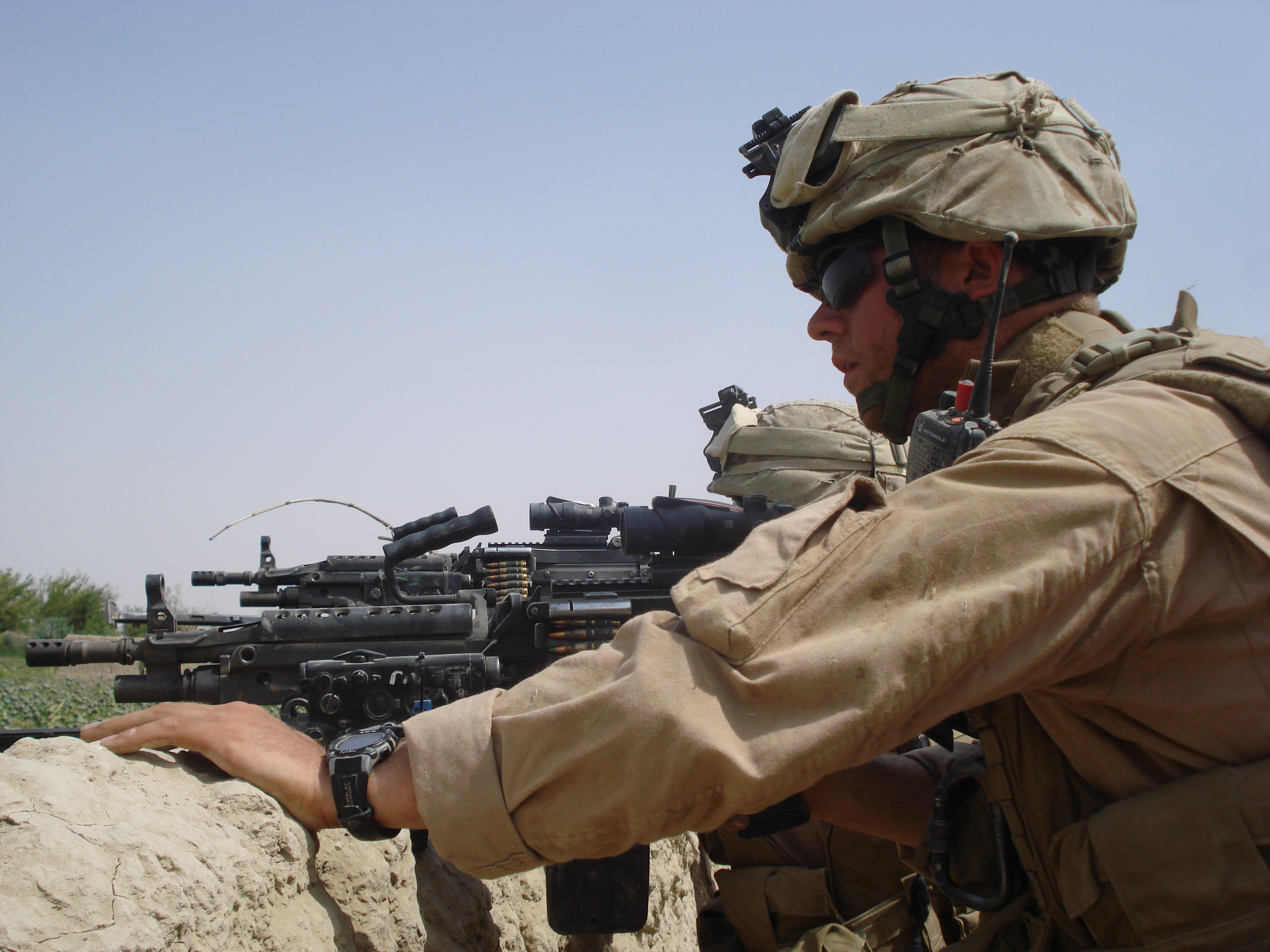
Marines of Charlie Company, 1/6, return fire on Taliban forces during the battle of Garmsir, Afghanistan 2008

In 2008, Battalion Landing Team 1/6 deployed with the 24th Marine Expeditionary Unit to Helmand Province, Afghanistan, in support of Operation Enduring Freedom. Beginning on 28 April, the battalion led Operation Azada Wosa in Garmsir District, breaking the stalemate between British and Afghan forces and Taliban forces south of the district center. During the 35-day principal combat phase, 1/6 reported approximately 170 engagements while clearing fortified positions, securing key routes and capturing Taliban strongpoints, including Jugroom Fort. The battalion subsequently transitioned to stabilization operations and remained in northern Garmsir until transferring security responsibility to Afghan forces and their British mentors on 8 September 2008. (Meritorious Unit Commendation, Afghanistan Campaign Medal, NATO Medal ISAF)

Marines of 1/6 on Patrol in Marjah, Afghanistan 2010

Marines of 1/6 provide security on a rooftop while a medical evacuation is in progress during Operation Moshtarak in Marjah, Afghanistan 2010

In December 2009, 1/6 deployed to Helmand Province, Afghanistan, in support of Operation Enduring Freedom. On 13 February 2010, the battalion, partnered with Afghan security forces, participated in Operation Moshtarak, a coalition operation to clear Taliban forces from Marjah and establish a lasting Afghan government and security presence. Alpha and Bravo Companies inserted by CH-53E Super Stallion helicopters into objectives within Marjah, while Charlie Company advanced from the southeastern perimeter to open a ground route into the area. Following the initial assault, 1/6 cleared fortified compounds and improvised explosive device belts, established security positions and conducted counterinsurgency operations to hold the area through the remainder of its deployment. The battalion returned to the United States during the summer of 2010. (Presidential Unit Citation, Navy Unit Commendation, Afghanistan Campaign Medal, NATO Medal ISAF)

In 2011, 1/6 returned to Helmand Province for a seven-month combat deployment and operated across three separate areas. Charlie Company remained in Marjah, where it reinforced 3rd Battalion, 6th Marines and partnered with Afghan security forces; Alpha Company operated in Sangin District, supporting the 3rd Reconnaissance Battalion and later the 1st Reconnaissance Battalion. During Operation Tofan Sharq (Eastern Storm), Headquarters and Service, Bravo, and Weapons Companies conducted offensive operations through Kajaki Sofla and secured Route 611 between Sangin and Kajaki District. Following heavy fighting, the battalion established patrol bases, supported Afghan forces, and expanded security into the Upper Sangin Valley. (Afghanistan Campaign Medal, NATO Medal ISAF)

In 2014 1/6 deployed as the ground element of the 22nd Marine Expeditionary Unit as the Bataan Amphibious Ready Group (BATARG) located in the 5th and 6th Fleet in support of Operation Inherent Resolve and the evacuation of the US embassy in Tripoli by 3rd Battalion 8th Marines(Operation Oaken Lotus). After the evacuation of the US embassy in Tripoli the 22nd Marine Expeditionary Unit's deployment was extended to support ongoing operations in Iraq, and Syria. Detachments of Marines were sent to Iraq to reinforce the US embassy in Baghdad, and support special operations forces in Kurdistan.(Navy Unit Commendation, Global War on Terrorism Expeditionary Medal)

In 2015, 1/6 participated in BALTOPS (Baltic Operations), an annual exercise with allied NATO forces in Poland, Sweden, Germany, and the Baltic States.

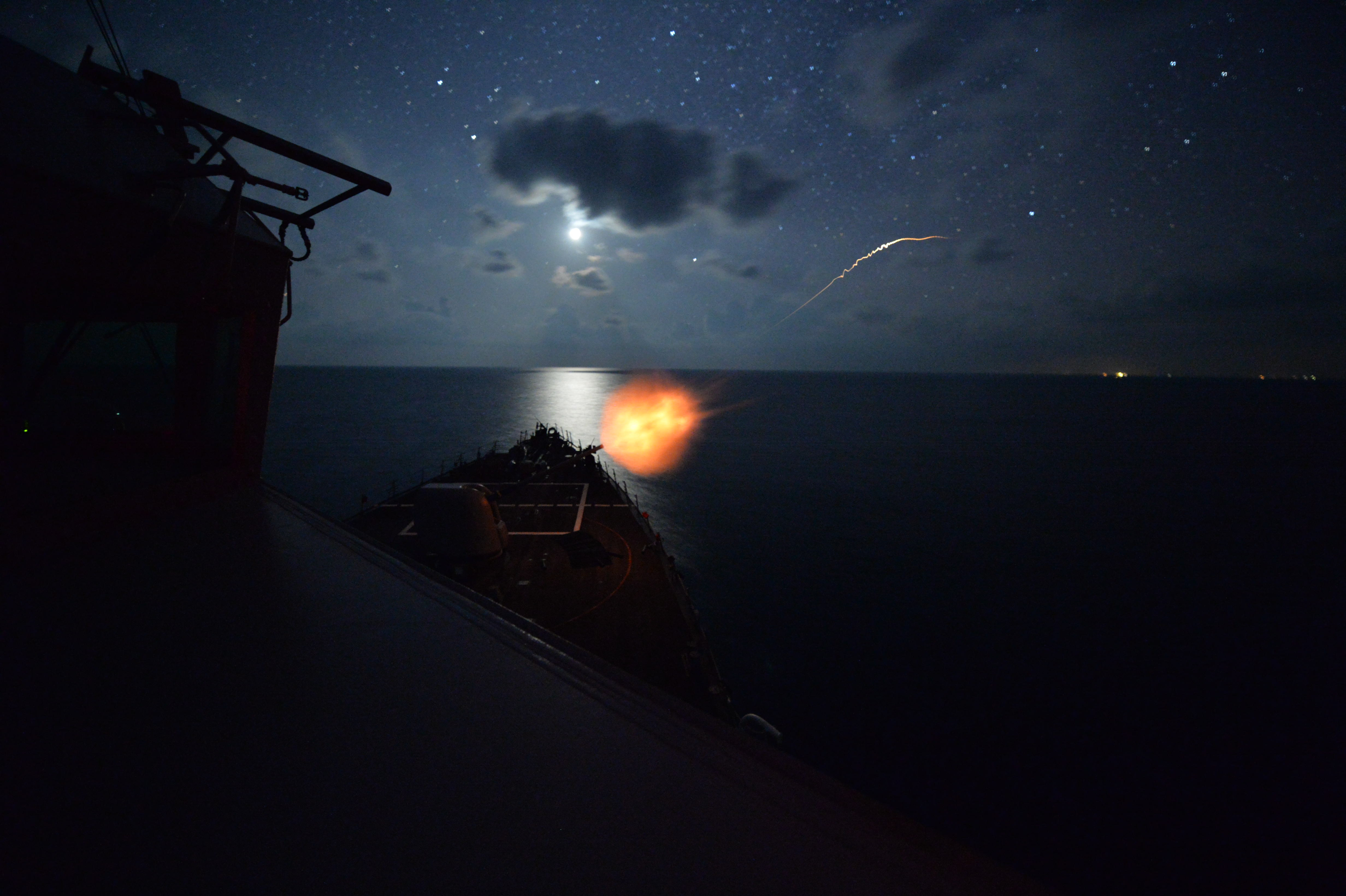
Battle of Sirte 2016 22nd MEU provides naval gunfire and air support to the GNA

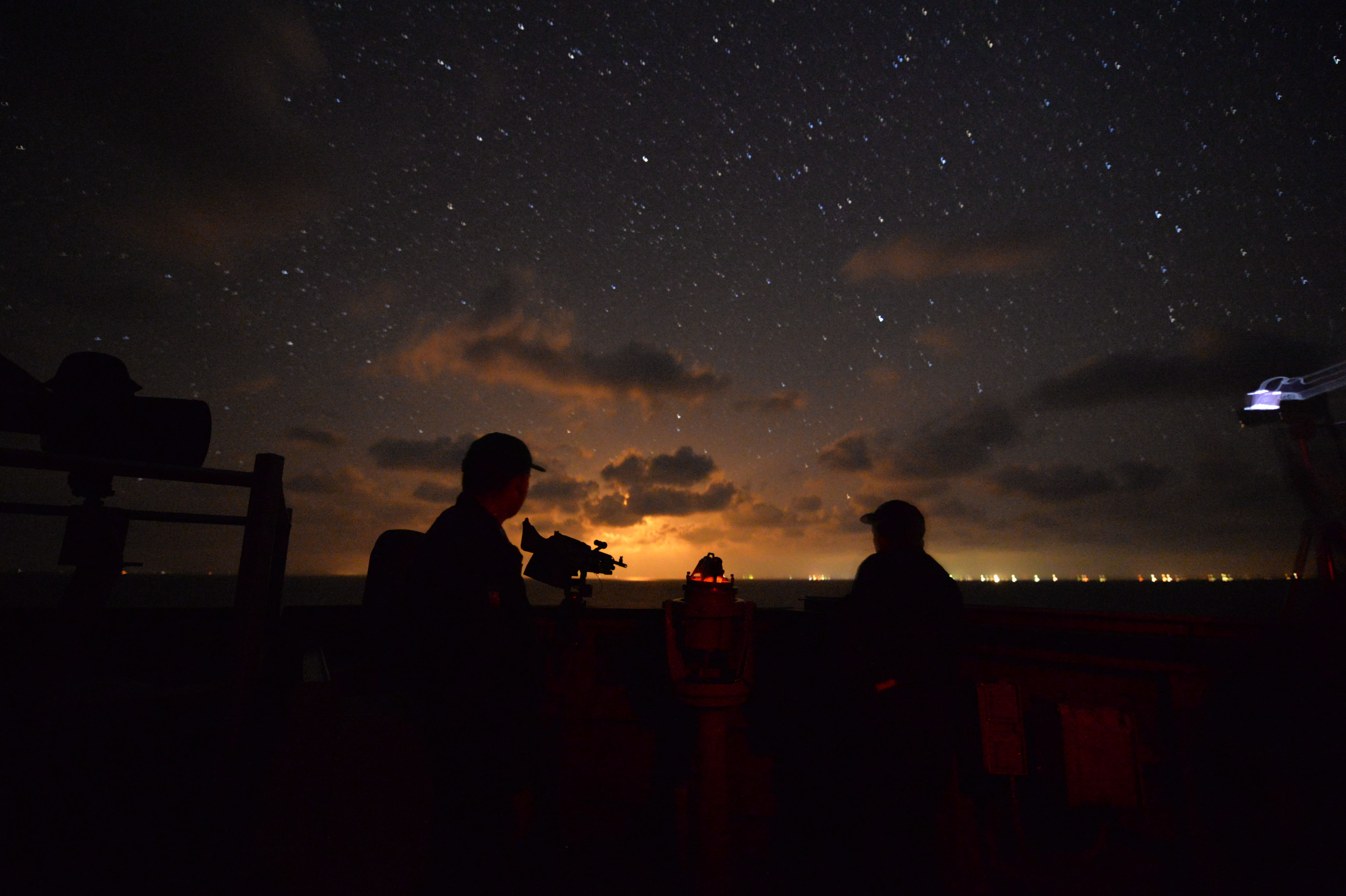
Members of the 22nd MEU on watch during the Battle of Sirte 2016

Operation Odyssey Lightning: In 2016, 1st Battalion 6th Marines deployed as the ground combat element of the 22nd Marine Expeditionary Unit. Aboard the USS Wasp, USS San Antonio, and USS Whidbey Island, Marines conducted precision strikes in support of the Libyan Government of National Accord-aligned forces against ISIS and Daesh targets in Sirte, Libya, as part of the Battle of Sirte (2016). Before joining the operation in Libya, elements of 1/6 aboard the USS San Antonio came under attack as it moved through the Bab al-Mandeb strait on the southern end of the Red Sea while conducting operations in support of Operation Enduring Freedom-Horn of Africa, Operation Restoring Hope, and Operation Oaken Steel. Shortly after the attacks, the USS Nitze destroyed three radar sites in Yemen in retaliation for the two separate attacks on U.S. ships in the Red Sea. This was credited as the first surface naval battle since the Persian Gulf War. Members of the 22nd MEU received the Presidential Unit Citation and Combat Action Ribbons for operations in Libya and Yemen. (Navy Unit Commendation, Global War on Terrorism Expeditionary Medal)

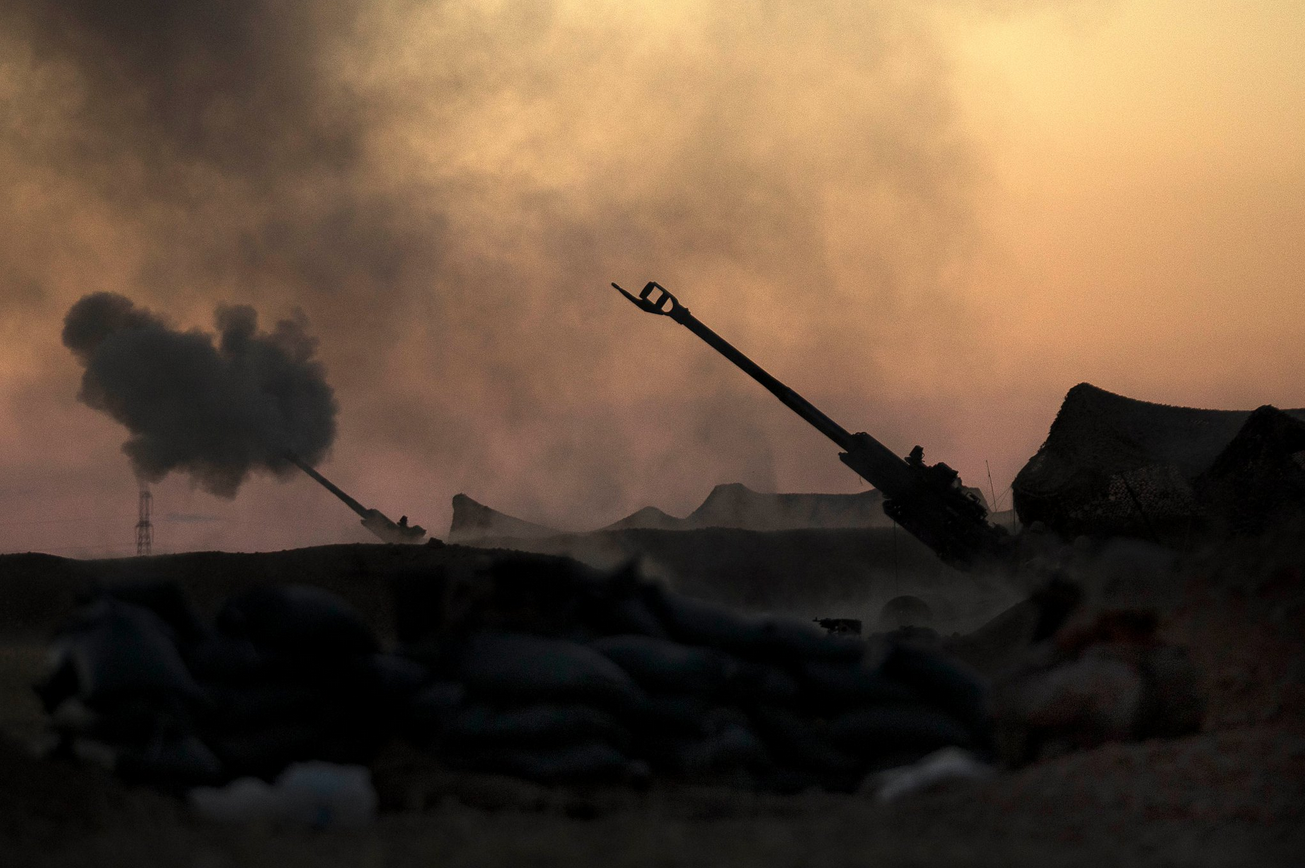
Battle of Raqqa 2017

Operation Inherent Resolve: In September 2017 elements of 1st Battalion 6th Marines deployed to Syria with 1st Battalion 10th Marines as a part of Combined Joint Task Force-Operation Inherent Resolve in order to support operations against ISIS militants in the Battle of Raqqa. (Joint Meritorious Unit Commendation, Navy Unit Commendation, Inherent Resolve Campaign Medal)

In 2018, 1/6 deployed as part of the Black Sea Rotational Force (18.1) postured in Mihail Kogălniceanu Air Base, Romania, which enabled the continuation of promoting regional stability, and building and maintaining enduring partnerships with allied and partner nations. 1/6 also sent Marines to Norway to train with allied NATO forces for a potential cold-weather fight with North Korea or Russia. Upon completion of their training the Marines of 1/6 had their deployment extended due to Hurricane Florence preventing them from returning to Camp Lejeune on schedule. (Navy Arctic Service Ribbon)

In 2020, 1st Battalion, 6th Marine Regiment deployed under the Unit Deployment Program to Camp Schwab, Okinawa, Japan under 3rd Marine Division. (Meritorious Unit Commendation)

In 2021, 1st Battalion, 6th Marine Regiment participated in Exercise Sea Breeze 2021 a multinational maritime exercise, involving sea, land, and air components, and is co-hosted by the United States and Ukraine to enhance interoperability and capability among participating forces in the Black Sea region.

On August 18, 2021; Bravo Company and other elements from the 1st Battalion, 6th Marine Regiment deployed aboard the USS Arlington (LPD 24) in U.S. 4th Fleet area of operations off the coast of Haiti in support of Joint Task Force-Haiti, following a 7.2-magnitude earthquake that struck Haiti on August 14. They returned on September 6. (Humanitarian Service Medal)

=== Post-Global War on Terrorism (2021 to Present) ===
From 2022 to 2023, 1st Battalion 6th Marines deployed as Battalion Landing Team 1/6, 26th Marine Expeditionary Unit to USEUCOM and USCENTCOM, providing critical support during the Israel-Hamas crisis and supporting numerous combatant commander requirements in Europe and the Middle East. (Navy Unit Commendation)

== Honors and awards ==
The 1st Battalion 6th Marines has been awarded the following:

- Presidential Unit Citation Streamer with Bronze star
  - World War II Tarawa – 1943
  - Afghanistan 2009–2010
- Joint Meritorious Unit Award
  - Operation Sea Signal 1994
  - Operation Pacific Haven 1996-1997 B Co
  - Operation Inherent Resolve 2017
- Navy Unit Commendation Streamer with Silver Star and Bronze Star
  - Panama – 1989
  - Southwest Asia – 1990–1991
  - Kosovo – 1999
  - Afghanistan – 2004, 2010
  - Iraq – 2006 – 2007
  - BLT 1/6 2014
  - BLT 1/6 2016
  - OIR 1/6 C - 2017
  - Israel-Hamas Conflict 2023–24
- Navy Meritorious Unit Commendation Streamer with Bronze Star
  - 1986–1987
  - Afghanistan 2008
  - 1/6 UDP 2020
- World War I Victory Streamer with five Bronze Stars
- Army of Occupation of Germany streamer
- Yangtze Service Streamer
- China Service Streamer
- Marine Corps Expeditionary Streamer with two Bronze Stars
- American Defense Service Streamer with one Bronze Star
- European – African – Middle Eastern Campaign Streamer
- Asiatic – Pacific Campaign Streamer with one Silver And One Bronze Star
- World War II Victory Streamer
- Navy Occupation Service Streamer With "Asia" And "Europe"
- National Defense Service Streamer with three Bronze Stars
- Armed Forces Expeditionary Streamer With one Bronze star
- South West Asia Service Streamer with two Bronze Stars
- Kosovo Campaign Streamer with on Bronze Star
- Global War on Terrorism Service Streamer
- Afghanistan Campaign Streamer with three Bronze Stars
- Iraq Campaign Streamer with three Bronze Stars
- Global War on Terrorism Expeditionary Streamer
- Inherent Resolve Campaign Streamer
- French Croix de guerre With Two Palms And One Gilt star, allowing the members to wear a Croix de guerre Fourragère.

== See also ==
- Organization of the United States Marine Corps
- List of United States Marine Corps battalions
- The Battle for Marjah
- Operation Asbury Park
