= Battle of Garmsir =

2008–2011 battle of the War in Afghanistan

- Part of the War in Afghanistan (2001–2021)
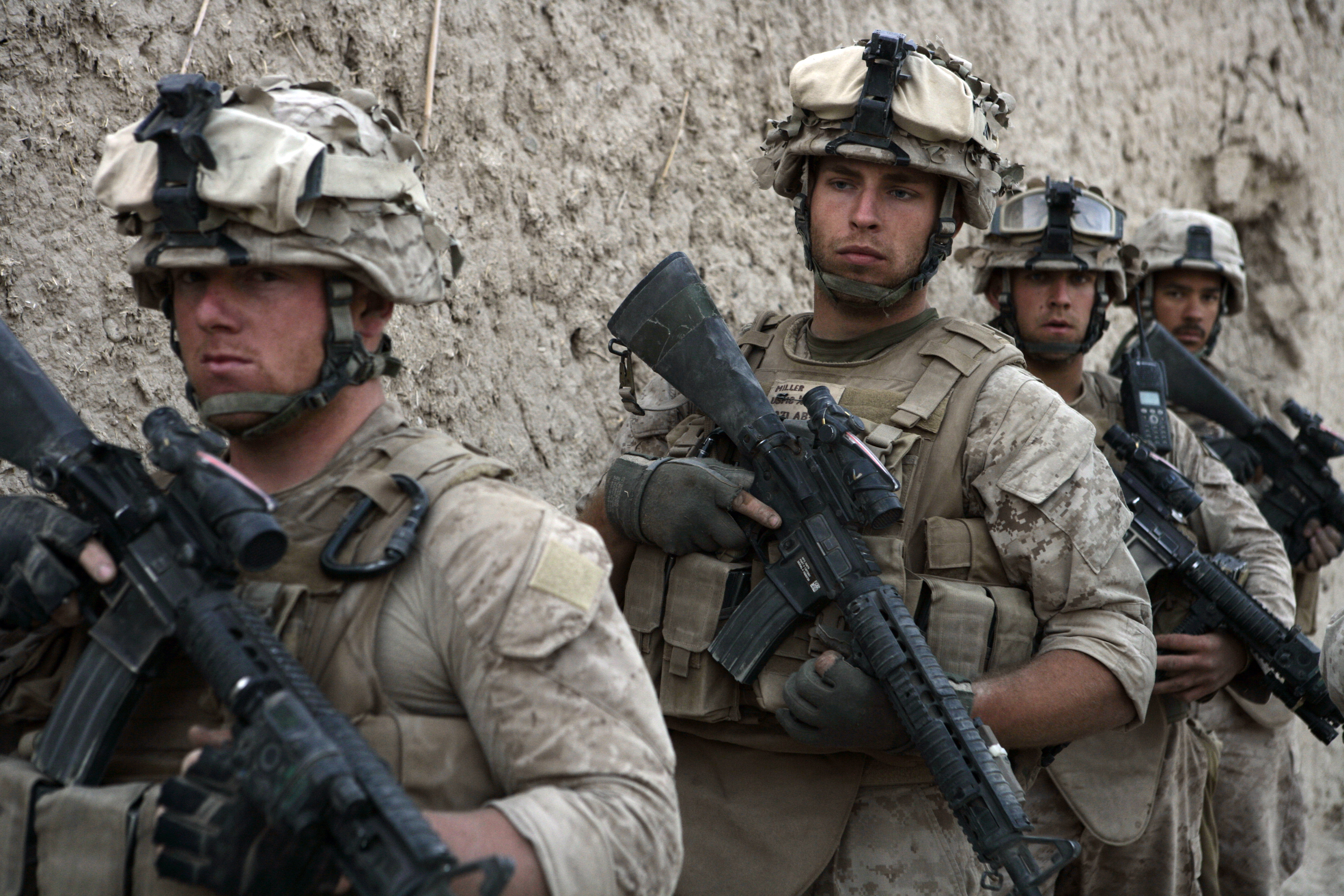
- US Marines with Bravo 1/6, 24th MEU in Garmsir, Afghanistan, May 2008
Date	April – 8 September 2008; 2009–2011
Location	Garmsir, Helmand province, Afghanistan
Result	USMC victory (2008)

Belligerents
Coalition: United States; United Kingdom; Estonia; Islamic Republic of Afghanistan	(Afghanistan) Taliban

Commanders and leaders
(United States) Lt. Col. Tony Henderson	(Afghanistan) Naeem Baraikh, shadow governor; (Afghanistan) Maulavi Ubaidurrahman Nurzai

Strength
(United States) Approx. 800 Marines	500

Casualties and losses
1 killed (2008)	498 killed (2008)

The Battle of Garmsir was a series of military operations fought between International Security Assistance Force and Afghan forces and the Taliban in Garmsir District, Helmand Province, Afghanistan. The principal phase began on 28 April 2008, when the United States Marine Corps' 24th Marine Expeditionary Unit launched Operation Azada Wosa to break a prolonged stalemate south of British positions, secure routes through the district center, and disrupt an important Taliban staging and logistics corridor. Battalion Landing Team 1st Battalion, 6th Marines, supported by British and Afghan forces, seized key terrain east of the Helmand River and fought approximately 170 engagements during a 35-day combat phase.

After the initial fighting, the Marines remained in northern Garmsir and transitioned to security and stabilization operations as residents returned and Afghan forces established a presence. On 8 September 2008, the 24th Marine Expeditionary Unit transferred responsibility for the area to Afghan forces and their British mentors after operating in Garmsir for approximately 130 days. The wider district remained contested, and coalition forces conducted additional operations in Garmsir between 2009 and 2011.

== Background ==
Garmsir District lies in the lower Helmand River valley, where most settlement and agriculture are concentrated along the river and an extensive system of irrigation canals. The surrounding desert restricted large-scale movement, making the river corridor important for travel and commerce through southern Helmand. Coalition planners also regarded Garmsir as a transit and staging area for Taliban personnel, weapons and supplies moving between the Afghanistan–Pakistan border region and other parts of Helmand Province.

Garmsir had changed hands several times after British forces deployed to Helmand in 2006. By late 2007, the fighting had settled into a stalemate. British and Afghan forces occupied positions near the district center and along the northern edge of the contested area, while Taliban forces controlled territory farther south. The Taliban operated from fortified compounds, bunkers, trenches and positions integrated into the canal system. British forces possessed artillery and air support but lacked sufficient ground forces to clear and permanently hold the wider district. Contemporary reporting described the British positions around Garmsir as a de facto boundary between territory held by the Afghan government and territory controlled by the Taliban.

In early 2008, the 24th Marine Expeditionary Unit was ordered to Afghanistan as a temporary reinforcement for the International Security Assistance Force. The unit began arriving in southern Afghanistan in March and was assigned to conduct operations in Garmsir. Initial planning called for securing routes through the district center, disrupting Taliban movement and extending the influence of the Afghan government. Marine planners expected the operation to last approximately seven to ten days, but the strength and persistence of Taliban resistance would substantially expand its duration and scope.

== Operation Azada Wosa ==
=== Planning and forces ===
1/6 Marines traversing Hwy 1 en route to Garmsir.

Operation Azada Wosa, also rendered Operation Asada Wosa, was planned by the 24th Marine Expeditionary Unit under Colonel Peter Petronzio. Its principal ground force was Battalion Landing Team 1st Battalion, 6th Marines, commanded by Lieutenant Colonel Anthony Henderson, with elements of 2nd Reconnaissance Battalion and aviation, artillery, engineer and logistics support from the Marine air-ground task force. The 24th MEU comprised approximately 2,400 personnel, although only part of the unit participated directly in the opening ground assault. The operation was coordinated with British forces of Task Force Helmand, including elements of 16 Air Assault Brigade holding positions north of the planned Marine advance.

The original mission was to secure routes through the Garmsir district center, disrupt Taliban movement and extend the reach of the Afghan government into territory south of the established coalition positions. Planners expected the mission to last between seven and ten days. The assault plan divided Battalion Landing Team 1/6 across three axes: Alpha and Bravo Companies would insert by helicopter into positions east and south of the district center, while motorized Charlie Company approached from the north. Charlie Company's movement was intended to draw Taliban attention toward the existing coalition line while the helicopter-borne companies established positions farther south.

=== Opening assault, 28-29 April ===
1/6 Marines engaging enemy during opening assault

Operation Azada Wosa began on the night of 28 April 2008. The opening helicopter assault was delayed by the temporary loss of aerial refueling support for the AV-8B Harriers assigned to cover the insertion. Attack helicopters were sent ahead to observe the landing zones, after which the first wave of transport helicopters departed at approximately 11:20 p.m. Successive waves carried Alpha and Bravo Companies into landing zones east and south of the district center during the night, with Marine aviation providing reconnaissance, illumination and close air support.

Charlie Company moved overland from the north and reached its attack position near the southernmost established coalition outpost by approximately 3:00 a.m. on 29 April. As daylight approached, the three companies were positioned along separate axes, with Charlie Company drawing attention from the north while Alpha and Bravo Companies occupied positions behind or south of the principal Taliban defensive line.

Charlie Company encountered organized resistance shortly after 8:00 a.m. and fought through Taliban positions north of the other Marine companies. Alpha and Bravo Companies also began receiving fire as Taliban fighters attempted to react to the helicopter insertions or move south. Within the first day, the Marines had penetrated the area they called the "Snake's Head", secured important crossing points and gained control of portions of the primary north-south route east of the Helmand River. Taliban forces withdrew from the immediate district-center area but established or reinforced positions farther south, where resistance became progressively stronger.

=== Thirty-five-day combat phase ===
1/6 Marines resting after clearing Taliban territory

During the next 35 days, Battalion Landing Team 1/6 reported approximately 170 engagements with Taliban forces. Charlie Company's initial advance continued for roughly 48 hours, while Alpha and Bravo Companies encountered regular resistance farther south and east. Although the pace of fighting decreased in some areas after the first four days, Taliban forces continued to contest the Marine advance and threaten the battalion's routes and supply lines.

The terrain favored the defenders. Taliban fighters used irrigation canals, dry ditches, agricultural fields and high vegetation to conceal movement and firing positions. They also occupied hardened compounds and prepared mutually supporting trench lines, bunkers, mines and improvised explosive devices. Marine operations throughout May included clearing fortified positions, opening and maintaining routes, locating weapons caches and maneuvering south through the district's canal and compound network. Infantry units relied on artillery, engineers and Marine aviation to reduce defensive positions and support movement.

The fighting occurred in areas from which much of the civilian population had already fled, but its effects extended beyond the opposing forces. Marine accounts reported that residents began returning to some areas after Taliban positions were cleared. Independent reporting from Garmsir documented extensive displacement and significant damage to homes in affected villages, illustrating the humanitarian costs of the operation even as coalition forces gained control of additional territory.

=== May 28-30 offensive and Jugroom Fort ===
Marines from 1/6 Charlie Company push into Jugroom Fort

Jugroom Fort stood near a Helmand River crossing and overlooked the southern approaches to the Garmsir district center. The nineteenth-century fort had been used by Taliban forces as a headquarters and defensive stronghold. Its defenses included trenches, bunkers, fighting positions, mines and heavy weapons. British Royal Marines had attempted to capture the position during Operation Glacier 2 in January 2007 but were repulsed after Lance Corporal Matthew Ford was killed and four other Royal Marines were wounded.

The final major offensive of Operation Azada Wosa began on May 28, when Marine forces advanced west from positions east of the Helmand River to disrupt the remaining Taliban defensive belt. The broader operation included Jugroom Fort and nearby positions along the river. The detailed account published by the United States Naval Institute places Charlie Company's direct advance on the fort on May 30.

Charlie Company moved southwest along a route known as Cowboys West with engineers, explosive ordnance disposal personnel, vehicles and aviation support. Near the village of Gholam Mohammad Kur, engineers fired an M58 Mine Clearing Line Charge to clear a path through suspected mines. Charlie Company's 1st Platoon then encountered heavy resistance while clearing the village north of the fort. Two Marines were wounded in the fighting.

After fixed-wing aircraft, artillery and attack helicopters struck the fort, engineers fired a second mine-clearing line charge along the route leading toward it. At approximately 1:30 p.m., Charlie Company's 3rd Platoon, led by First Lieutenant Mark Peters, advanced approximately 800 meters toward the fort under helicopter cover. The Marines entered through gaps in the outer wall and cleared the position through a series of trenches, bunkers, fighting positions and mud-brick structures. By approximately 5:00 p.m., the platoon had reached the fort's southern bastion and established defensive positions.

The capture of Jugroom Fort removed one of the Taliban's strongest remaining positions in northern Garmsir. Marine accounts described May 30 as the final sustained engagement of the initial combat phase, although smaller clearing operations and intermittent fighting continued afterward. The 24th MEU subsequently shifted its main effort from offensive maneuver to holding the area and supporting stabilization operations.

=== Stabilization operations ===
1/6 Marines patrol compounds in Garmsir.

Following the major combat phase, the 24th MEU's mission changed from clearing routes and enemy positions to holding northern Garmsir and supporting the return of Afghan government authority. Marine patrols continued to search for weapons, improvised explosive devices and remaining Taliban fighters, but the principal effort shifted toward population security. As Afghan National Security Forces entered the district, unilateral Marine patrols increasingly became joint patrols intended to establish an enduring Afghan presence.

On June 23, the Marines and British forces of Task Force Helmand opened a Joint Civil-Military Operations Centre in Garmsir, the first such center established in Regional Command South. Residents used the center to meet coalition representatives, present property-damage claims and discuss local security and reconstruction needs. During the 24th MEU's deployment, 1,082 Afghan residents visited the American portion of the center, and coalition authorities distributed almost 39 million Afghanis in compensation for property damaged during the fighting.

Coalition and NATO accounts reported that the reduced fighting allowed residents to return, the district bazaar and hospital to reopen, and local leaders to hold Garmsir's first major shura in nearly three years. Authorities also assessed the canal system, dug wells, repaired schools and organized markets and livestock auctions. Afghan security forces gradually established positions and participated in security operations alongside the Marines.

Conditions nevertheless remained uncertain. The 24th MEU characterized Garmsir as "stable, but not secure", and acknowledged that Taliban fighters remained in the district even though they were no longer engaging Marine forces at the previous intensity. Independent reporting described a revived marketplace and returning residents but also documented destroyed homes, abandoned farmland, mines and complaints that compensation and humanitarian assistance were inadequate or unevenly distributed. Taliban activity also continued in areas outside the immediate district center.

=== Transfer of responsibility ===
The 24th MEU began transferring its civil-military responsibilities before completing its military handover. American operations at the Joint Civil-Military Operations Centre ended on August 29, and responsibility for the center passed to British forces on September 3.

On September 8, 2008, after approximately 130 days in Garmsir, the 24th MEU formally transferred responsibility for security in northern Garmsir to the Afghan National Army's 4th Battalion, 3rd Brigade, 205th Corps and its British mentors. The transfer applied primarily to the northern district center and the area secured during Operation Azada Wosa, rather than the entirety of Garmsir District.

The operation had broken the earlier stalemate, opened routes through the northern district and removed Taliban forces from several established defensive positions. It had not, however, eliminated the Taliban presence throughout Garmsir. Insurgents remained active farther south and continued using guerrilla attacks and improvised explosive devices. After the handover, the 24th MEU consolidated at Kandahar Airfield in preparation for redeployment, while Afghan and British forces assumed responsibility for holding the area.

=== Casualties and civilian impact ===
Corporal William J. Cooper of Weapons Company, Battalion Landing Team 1/6, was killed near Garmsir on May 19, 2008, while supporting combat operations. Other Marines were wounded during the fighting, including two members of Charlie Company during the clearing of Gholam Mohammad Kur, but the available published sources do not provide a definitive total for American wounded throughout the operation.

Estimates of Taliban losses varied. At the September handover, ISAF attributed a figure of more than 400 Taliban fighters killed to Helmand governor Gulab Mangal. Mangal separately told the Institute for War and Peace Reporting that approximately 500 foreign Taliban fighters had been killed. These estimates were not independently verified, and the precision implied by the figure of 498 Taliban deaths previously listed in the article's infobox is not supported by the cited sources.

Civilian casualties and displacement were also disputed. ISAF's September summary stated that the operation caused no civilian casualties. During the combat phase, however, an ISAF spokesman had said only that the organization had received no reports of civilian casualties and explicitly declined to state that none had occurred. Independent reporters encountered extensive destruction and reported finding the body of a man said by residents to have died from shrapnel wounds, although responsibility for his death was not established.

Estimates of displacement differed substantially. ISAF reported approximately 4,000 displaced people, many of whom it said had left before the operation. Afghan officials and local organizations offered considerably higher estimates, with one estimate approaching 8,000 displaced families. Residents interviewed after the fighting described destroyed homes, damaged farmland, unexploded ordnance and mines, while some complained that compensation and humanitarian assistance had not reached all affected communities.

== Operation Khanjar ==
On 18 June 2009, Marines from the 2nd Battalion, 8th Marines (2/8), as part of the northern push of Operation Khanjar, entered Garmsir Province.

By 5 July, elements of 2/8 were engaged in heavy fighting at Toshtay, 16 miles (26 km) south of Garmsir. After protracted fighting, the Marines overcame much of the Taliban resistance and began to set up additional patrol bases in Garmsir as part of the Clear-Hold-Build strategy designed to drive the Taliban south and continue Marine territorial gains.

== Operation Roadhouse ==
In April 2010, Marines from the 3rd Battalion, 1st Marines (3/1) deployed to Garmsir District, commanded by Lieutenant Colonel Benjamin Watson.

During their deployment, they established several new patrol bases in the southernmost parts of Garmsir, as well as fought building by building in intense fighting to clear the heavily fortified and IED filled Taliban stronghold of Safaar Bazaar. The capture of Safaar was a major defeat for the Taliban in the district.

== Operation Godfather ==
On 14 January 2011, Marines from the 2nd Battalion, 1st Marines and Afghan National Army soldiers began clearing Durzay, one of the last remaining Taliban strongholds in the Garmsir District. Marines also crossed over to the western banks of the Helmand River and established positions to deny the Taliban the freedom of movement that had previously allowed them to continue transporting weapons and supplies from Pakistan despite the increased Marine presence in Garmsir. The Marines encountered less resistance than expected and Operation Godfather marked the end of major fighting in the Battle for Garmsir, although the Taliban continued to fight after the operation's conclusion using guerrilla tactics and IED emplacement.

== See also ==
- Helmand Province campaign – ISAF campaign in Helmand Province
