= Edhie =

Edhie is an Indonesian name. Notable people with the name include:

- Edhie Yudhoyono (born 1980), Indonesian politician
- Iroth Sonny Edhie (born 1971), Indonesian army general
- Pramono Edhie Wibowo (1955–2020), Indonesian military officer
- Sarwo Edhie Wibowo (1925–1989), Indonesian military leader
