= Jim Mattis =

American military officer (born 1950)

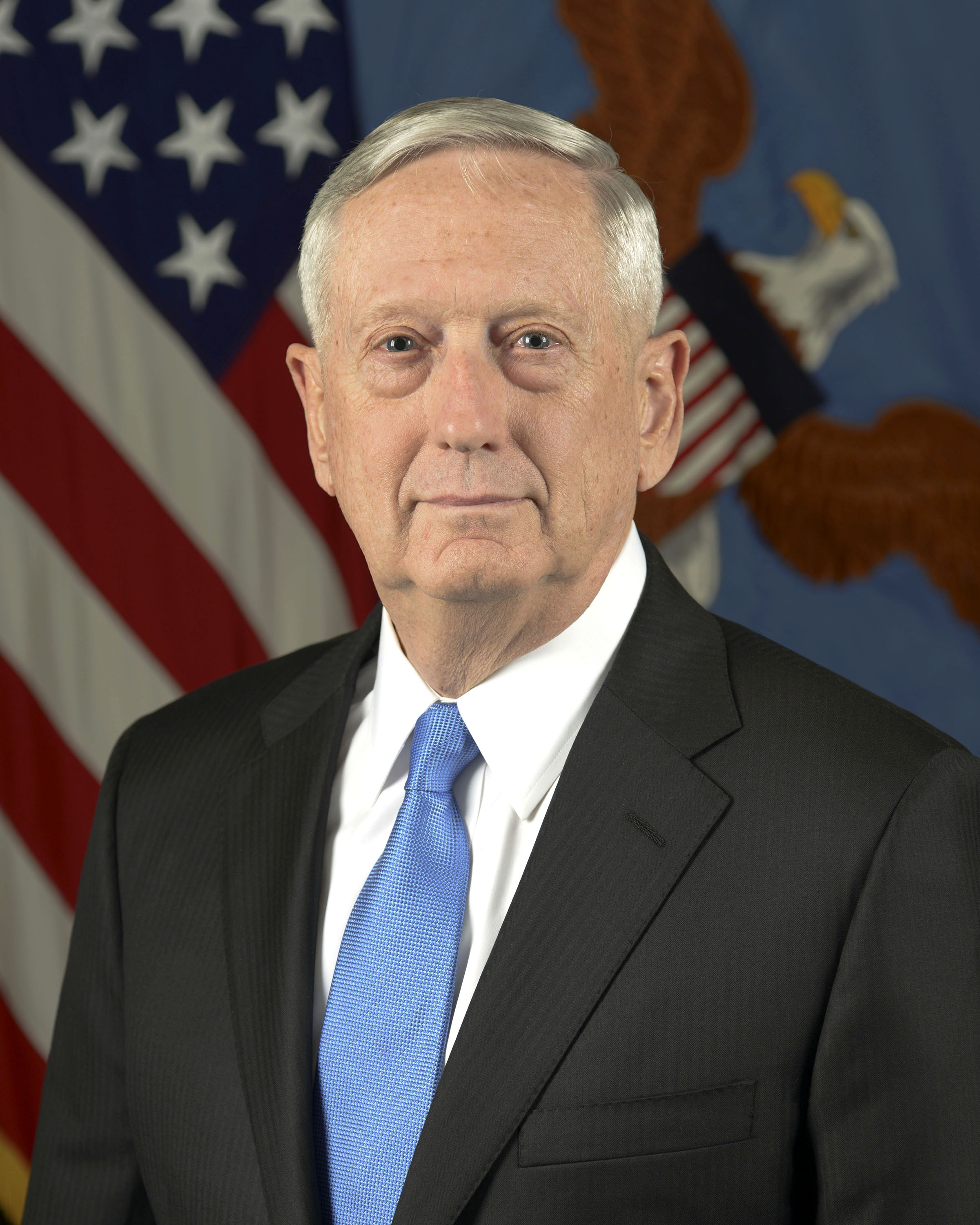
- Official portrait, 2017

26th United States Secretary of Defense
- In office January 20, 2017 – January 1, 2019
- President: Donald Trump
- Deputy: Robert O. Work; Patrick M. Shanahan
- Preceded by: Ash Carter
- Succeeded by: Patrick M. Shanahan (acting)

11th Commander of the United States Central Command
- In office August 11, 2010 – March 22, 2013
- President: Barack Obama
- Preceded by: David Petraeus
- Succeeded by: Lloyd Austin

5th Commander of the United States Joint Forces Command
- In office November 9, 2007 – August 11, 2010
- President: George W. Bush; Barack Obama
- Preceded by: Lance L. Smith
- Succeeded by: Raymond T. Odierno

3rd Supreme Allied Commander Transformation
- In office November 9, 2007 – September 8, 2008
- Deputy: Luciano Zappata
- Preceded by: Lance L. Smith
- Succeeded by: Stéphane Abrial

Personal details
- Born: James Norman Mattis; September 8, 1950 (age 76) Pullman, Washington, U.S.
- Party: Independent
- Spouse: Christina Lomasney (m. 2022)
- Education: Central Washington University (BA); National Defense University (MA)
- Nicknames: "Chaos" (callsign); "Warrior Monk"; "Mad Dog"

Military service
- Allegiance: United States
- Branch/service: United States Marine Corps
- Years of service: 1969–2013
- Rank: General
- Commands: United States Central Command; United States Joint Forces Command; Supreme Allied Commander Transformation; I Marine Expeditionary Force; United States Marine Forces Central Command; Marine Corps Combat Development Command; 1st Marine Division; 1st Marine Expeditionary Brigade; 7th Marine Regiment; 1st Battalion, 7th Marines
- Battles/wars: Gulf War; War in Afghanistan; Iraq War; Invasion of Iraq; First Battle of Fallujah; Second Battle of Fallujah
- Awards: Defense Distinguished Service Medal (2); Navy Distinguished Service Medal; Defense Superior Service Medal; Legion of Merit; Bronze Star Medal (with Valor); Meritorious Service Medal (3)
- Mattis's voice Mattis testifying before the Senate Armed Services Committee on Afghanistan. Recorded October 3, 2017

James Norman Mattis (born September 8, 1950) is an American military officer who served as the 26th United States secretary of defense from 2017 to 2019. A retired Marine Corps four-star general, he commanded forces in the Gulf War, the war in Afghanistan, and the Iraq War.

Mattis was commissioned in the Marine Corps through the Naval Reserve Officers' Training Corps after graduating from Central Washington University. A career Marine, he gained a reputation among his peers for intellectualism and eventually advanced to the rank of general. From 2007 to 2010, he commanded the United States Joint Forces Command and concurrently served as NATO's Supreme Allied Commander Transformation. He was commander of United States Central Command from 2010 to 2013, with Admiral Bob Harward serving as his deputy commander. After retiring from the military, Mattis held several private sector roles, including serving on the board of directors at Theranos.

Mattis was nominated as secretary of defense by President-elect Donald Trump, and confirmed by the Senate on January 20, 2017. As the secretary of defense, Mattis affirmed the United States' commitment to defending longtime ally South Korea in the wake of the 2017 North Korea crisis. An opponent of proposed collaboration with China and Russia, Mattis stressed what he saw as their "threat to the American-led world order". Mattis occasionally voiced his disagreement with certain Trump administration policies such as the withdrawal from the Iran nuclear deal, withdrawals of troops from Syria and Afghanistan, and budget cuts hampering the ability to monitor the impacts of climate change. According to The Hill, Mattis also reportedly dissuaded Trump from attempting to assassinate Bashar al-Assad, the president of Syria.

On December 20, 2018, after failing to convince Trump to reconsider his decision to withdraw all American troops from Syria, Mattis announced his resignation effective the end of February 2019; after Mattis's resignation generated significant media coverage, Trump abruptly accelerated Mattis's departure date to January 1, 2019, stating that he had essentially fired Mattis.

== Early life ==
Mattis was born on September 8, 1950, in Pullman, Washington. He is the son of Lucille (Proulx) Mattis and John West Mattis, a merchant mariner. His mother immigrated to the United States from Canada as an infant and had worked in Army Intelligence in South Africa during the Second World War. Mattis's father moved to Richland, Washington, to work at a plant supplying fissile material to the Manhattan Project. Mattis was raised in a bookish household that did not own a television.

Mattis graduated from Richland High School in 1968. He earned a Bachelor of Arts in history from Central Washington University in 1971 and a Master of Arts in international security affairs from the National War College of National Defense University in 1994.

== Marine career ==
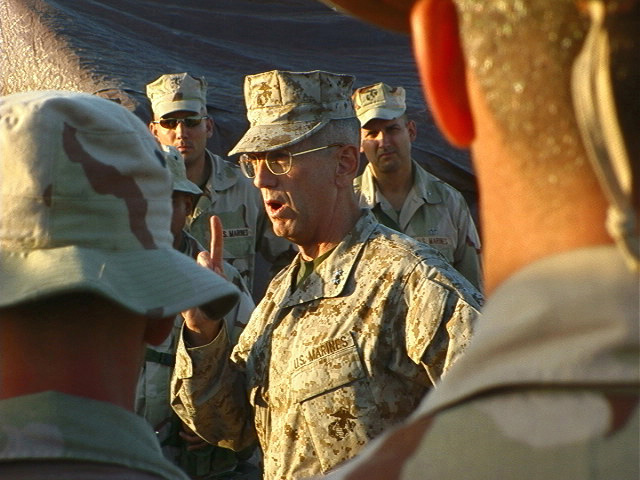
Mattis addressing Marines at Camp Commando, Kuwait, during Operation Enduring Freedom in February 2003

Mattis enlisted in the Marine Corps Reserve in 1969. He was commissioned a second lieutenant through the Naval Reserve Officers' Training Corps on January 1, 1972. During his service years, Mattis was considered an "intellectual" among the upper ranks. Robert H. Scales, a retired United States Army major general, called him "one of the most urbane and polished men I have known." As a lieutenant, Mattis was assigned as a rifle and weapons platoon commander in the 3rd Marine Division. As a captain, he was assigned as the Naval Academy Preparatory School's Battalion Officer, commanded rifle and weapons companies in the 1st Marine Regiment, then served at Recruiting Station Portland, Oregon, as a major. Upon promotion to the rank of lieutenant colonel, Mattis commanded 1st Battalion, 7th Marines, one of Task Force Ripper's assault battalions during the Gulf War. As a colonel, Mattis commanded the 7th Marine Regiment from June 28, 1994, to June 14, 1996.

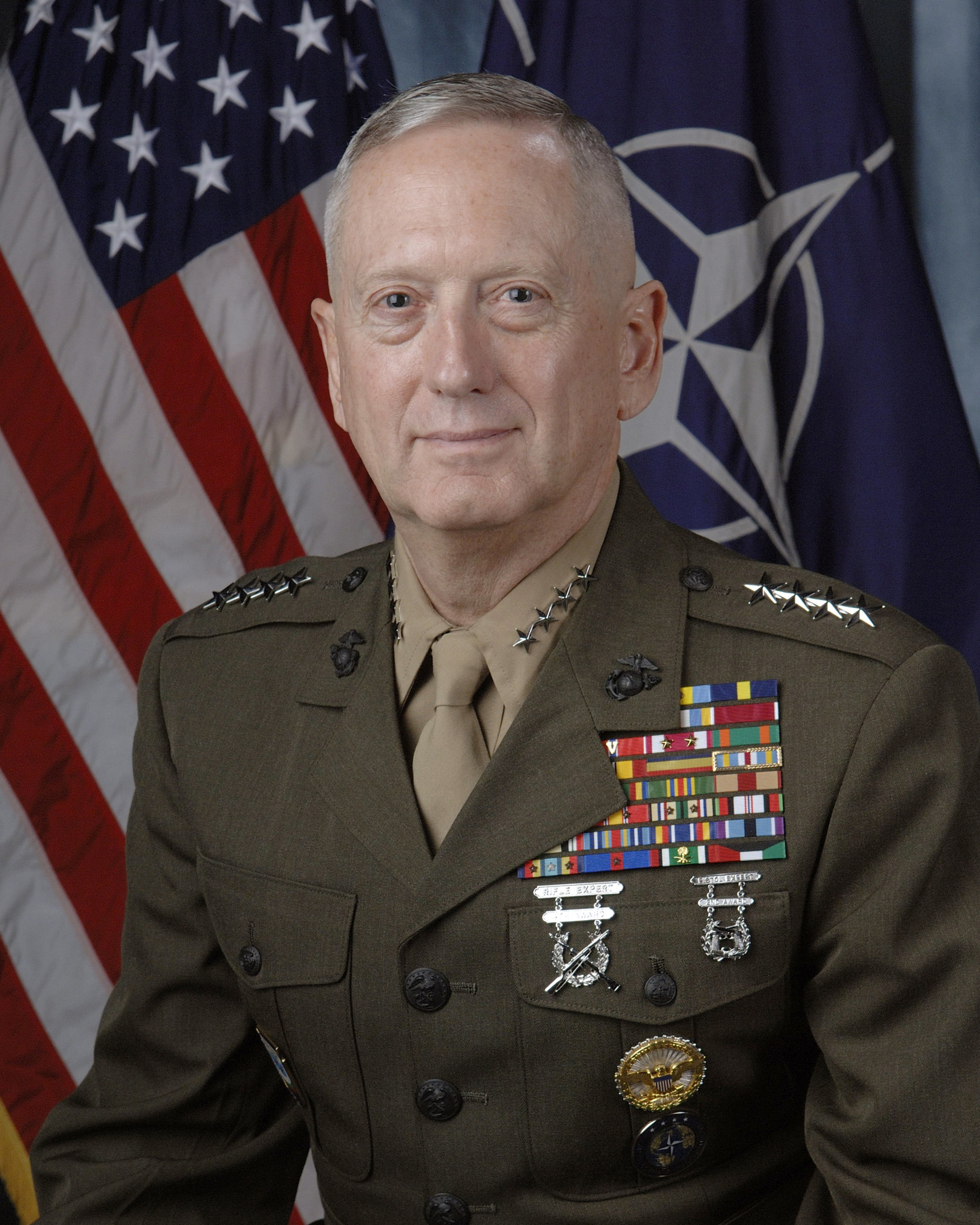
Official portrait as Supreme Allied Commander Transformation

Mattis is a graduate of the US Marine Corps Amphibious Warfare School, US Marine Corps Command and Staff College, and the National War College. He is noted for his interest in the study of military history and world history, with a personal library that once included over 7,000 volumes, and a penchant for publishing required reading lists for Marines under his command. He required his Marines to be well-read in the culture and history of regions where they were deployed, and had his Marines deploying to Iraq undergo "cultural sensitivity training". According to an article published in 2004 by the Los Angeles Times it was his concern for the enlisted ranks along with his energy and enthusiasm that garnered him the nickname "Mad Dog". But in 2016, when President-elect Trump asked Mattis if his nickname was indeed "Mad Dog", Mattis replied, "No, sir," saying that his actual nickname was "Chaos".

=== War in Afghanistan ===
Mattis led the 1st Marine Expeditionary Brigade as its commanding officer upon promotion to brigadier general. It was as a regimental commander that he earned his nickname and call sign, "CHAOS", an acronym for "Colonel Has Another Outstanding Solution", which was initially somewhat tongue in cheek.

During the initial planning for the War in Afghanistan, Mattis led Task Force 58 in operations in the southern part of the country beginning in November 2001. This led to him becoming the first Marine Corps officer to command a Naval Task Force in combat. According to Mattis, his objective upon arriving in Afghanistan was to "make sure that the enemy didn't feel like they had any safe haven, to destroy their sense of security in southern Afghanistan, to isolate Kandahar from its lines of communication, and to move against Kandahar". In December 2001, an airstrike carried out by a B-52 bomber inadvertently targeted a position held by US special operations troops and Afghan militiamen in Uruzgan Province. Numerous men were wounded in the incident, but Mattis repeatedly refused to dispatch helicopters from the nearby Camp Rhino to recover them, citing operational safety concerns. Instead, an Air Force helicopter flew from Uzbekistan to ferry the men to the Marine Corps base where helicopters sat readily available but unauthorized to fly. Captain Jason Amerine blamed the delay caused by Mattis's refusal to order a rescue operation for the deaths of several men. Amerine wrote, "Every element in Afghanistan tried to help us except the closest friendly unit, commanded by Mattis," though he also wrote that "none of that was assessed properly because the [5th Special Forces Group] chose not to call for a formal investigation". This episode was used against Mattis when he was nominated for defense secretary in 2016.

While serving in Afghanistan as a brigadier general, Mattis was known as an officer who engaged his men with "real leadership". A young Marine officer, Nathaniel Fick, said he witnessed Mattis in a fighting hole talking with a sergeant and lance corporal: "No one would have questioned Mattis if he'd slept eight hours each night in a private room, to be woken each morning by an aide who ironed his uniforms and heated his MREs. But there he was, in the middle of a freezing night, out on the lines with his Marines."

=== Iraq War ===
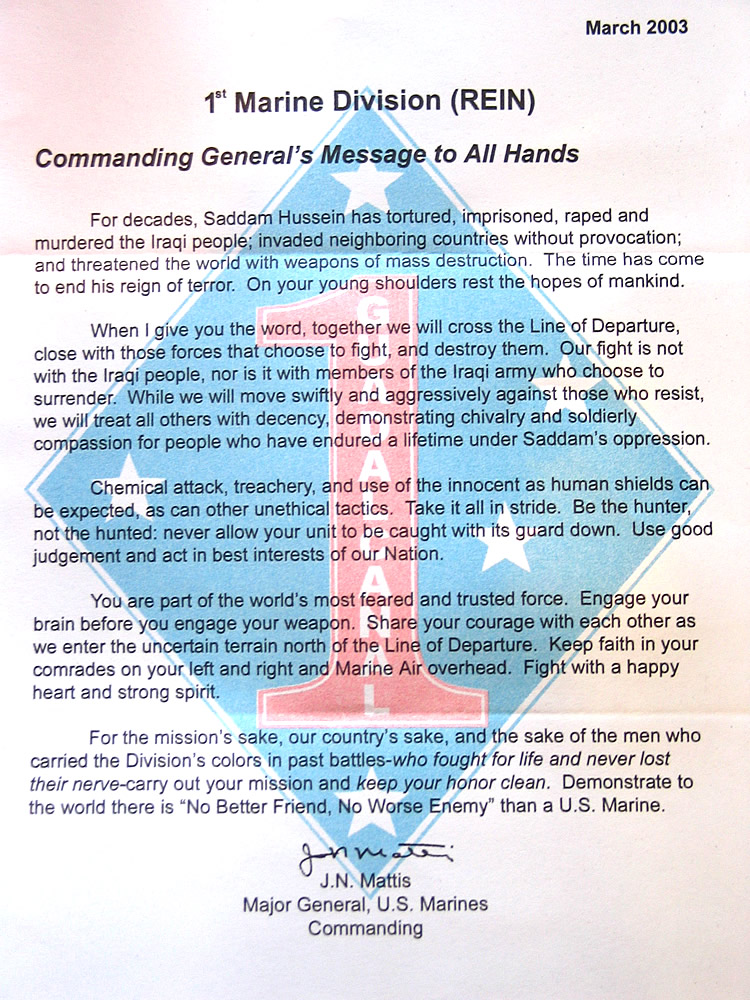
Letter written by Mattis on the eve of the 2003 invasion of Iraq, addressed to members of the 1st Marine Division

As a major general, Mattis commanded the 1st Marine Division during the 2003 invasion of Iraq and the Iraq War. Mattis played key roles in combat operations in Fallujah, including negotiation with the insurgent command inside the city during Operation Vigilant Resolve in April 2004, as well as participation in planning of the subsequent Operation Phantom Fury in November.

==== Wedding bombing ====
In May 2004, Mattis ordered the 3 a.m. bombing of what his intelligence section had reported was a suspected enemy safe house near the Syrian border, but was later reported to be a wedding party and allegedly resulted in the deaths of 42 civilians, including 11 women and 14 children. Mattis said it had taken him 30 seconds to decide whether to bomb the location. Describing the wedding as implausible, he said, "How many people go to the middle of the desert to hold a wedding 80 miles (130 km) from the nearest civilization? These were more than two dozen military-age males. Let's not be naive." The occurrence of a wedding was disputed by military officials, but the Associated Press obtained video footage showing a wedding party and a video the next day showed musical instruments and party decoration among the remains. When asked by the press about footage on Arabic television of a child's body being lowered into a grave, he replied: "I have not seen the pictures but bad things happen in wars. I don't have to apologize for the conduct of my men."

==== Department of Defense survey ====
Following a Department of Defense survey that showed only 55% of US soldiers and 40% of Marines would report a colleague for abusing civilians, Mattis told Marines in May 2007 that "whenever you show anger or disgust toward civilians, it's a victory for al-Qaeda and other insurgents." Believing that a need for restraint in war as key to defeating an insurgency, he added: "every time you wave at an Iraqi civilian, al-Qaeda rolls over in its grave."

==== 1st Marine Division's motto "no better friend, no worse enemy" ====
Mattis popularized the 1st Marine Division's motto "no better friend, no worse enemy", a paraphrase of the epitaph the Roman dictator Lucius Cornelius Sulla wrote for himself, in his open letter to all men within the division for their return to Iraq. This phrase later became widely publicized during the investigation into the conduct of Lieutenant Ilario Pantano, a platoon commander serving under Mattis.

==== Cultural sensitivity training ====
As his division prepared to ship out, Mattis called in "experts on the Middle East" for "cultural sensitivity training". He constantly toured the battlefield to tell stories of Marines who were able to show "discretion in moments of high pressure". As an apparent example, he encouraged his Marines to grow moustaches to look more like the people they were working with.

==== Removal of senior leaders ====
He was also noted for a willingness to remove senior leaders under his command when the US military seemed unable or unwilling to relieve underperforming or incompetent officers. During the division's push to Baghdad, Mattis relieved Colonel Joe D. Dowdy, commander of Regimental Combat Team-1. It was such a rare occurrence in the modern military that it made the front page of newspapers. Despite this, Mattis declined to comment on the matter publicly other than to say that the practice of officer relief remains alive, or at least "we are doing it in the Marines." Later interviews of Dowdy's officers and men revealed that "the colonel was doomed partly by an age-old wartime tension: Men versus mission—in which he favored his men," while Mattis insisted on execution of the mission to seize Baghdad swiftly.

=== Combat Development Command ===
After being promoted to lieutenant general, Mattis took command of Marine Corps Combat Development Command. In February 2005, speaking at a forum in San Diego, he said, "Actually it's quite fun to fight them, you know. It's a hell of a hoot. It's fun to shoot some people. I'll be right up there with you. I like brawling. You go into Afghanistan, you got guys who slap women around for five years because they didn't wear a veil. You know, guys like that ain't got no manhood left anyway. So it's a hell of a lot of fun to shoot them." Mattis's remarks sparked controversy; General Michael Hagee, commandant of the Marine Corps, issued a statement suggesting Mattis should have chosen his words more carefully, but he would not be disciplined.

=== US Joint Forces Command ===
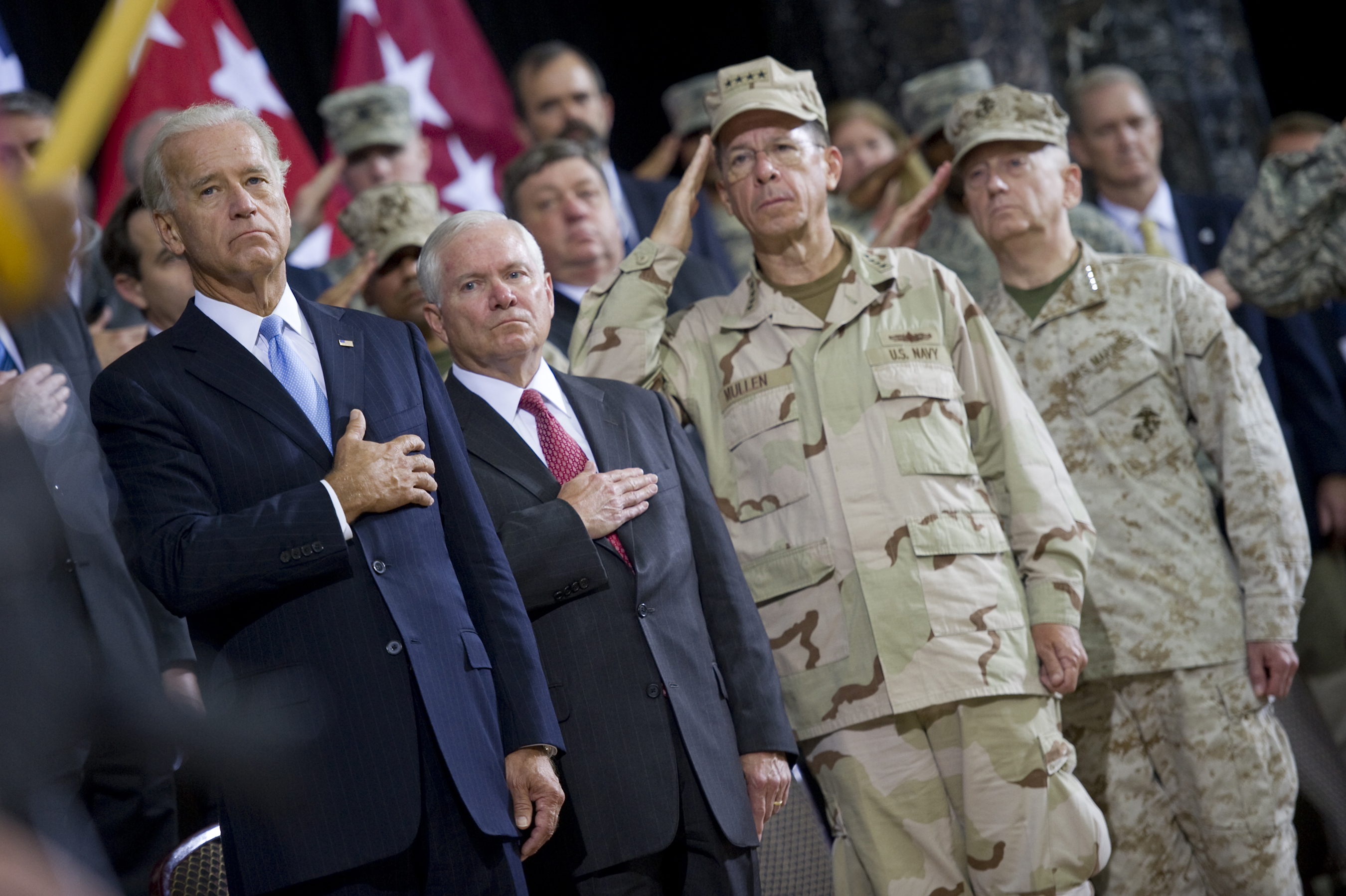
Vice President Joe Biden, Secretary of Defense Robert Gates, Admiral Mike Mullen and General Mattis in Baghdad, Iraq, September 2010

The Pentagon announced on May 31, 2006, that Mattis had been chosen to take command of the I Marine Expeditionary Force, based out of Marine Corps Base Camp Pendleton. On September 11, 2007, Secretary of Defense Robert Gates announced that President George W. Bush had nominated Mattis for appointment to the rank of general to command US Joint Forces Command (USJFCOM) in Norfolk, Virginia. NATO agreed to appoint Mattis as Supreme Allied Commander Transformation (SACT). On September 28, 2007, the United States Senate confirmed Mattis's nomination, and he relinquished command of the I MEF on November 5, 2007, to Lieutenant General Samuel Helland.

Mattis was promoted to four-star general and took control of USJFCOM/SACT on November 9, 2007. On September 9, 2009, French Air Force General Stéphane Abrial assumed the position of SACT. Mattis remained commander of JFCOM from November 2007 until September 2010.

=== US Central Command ===
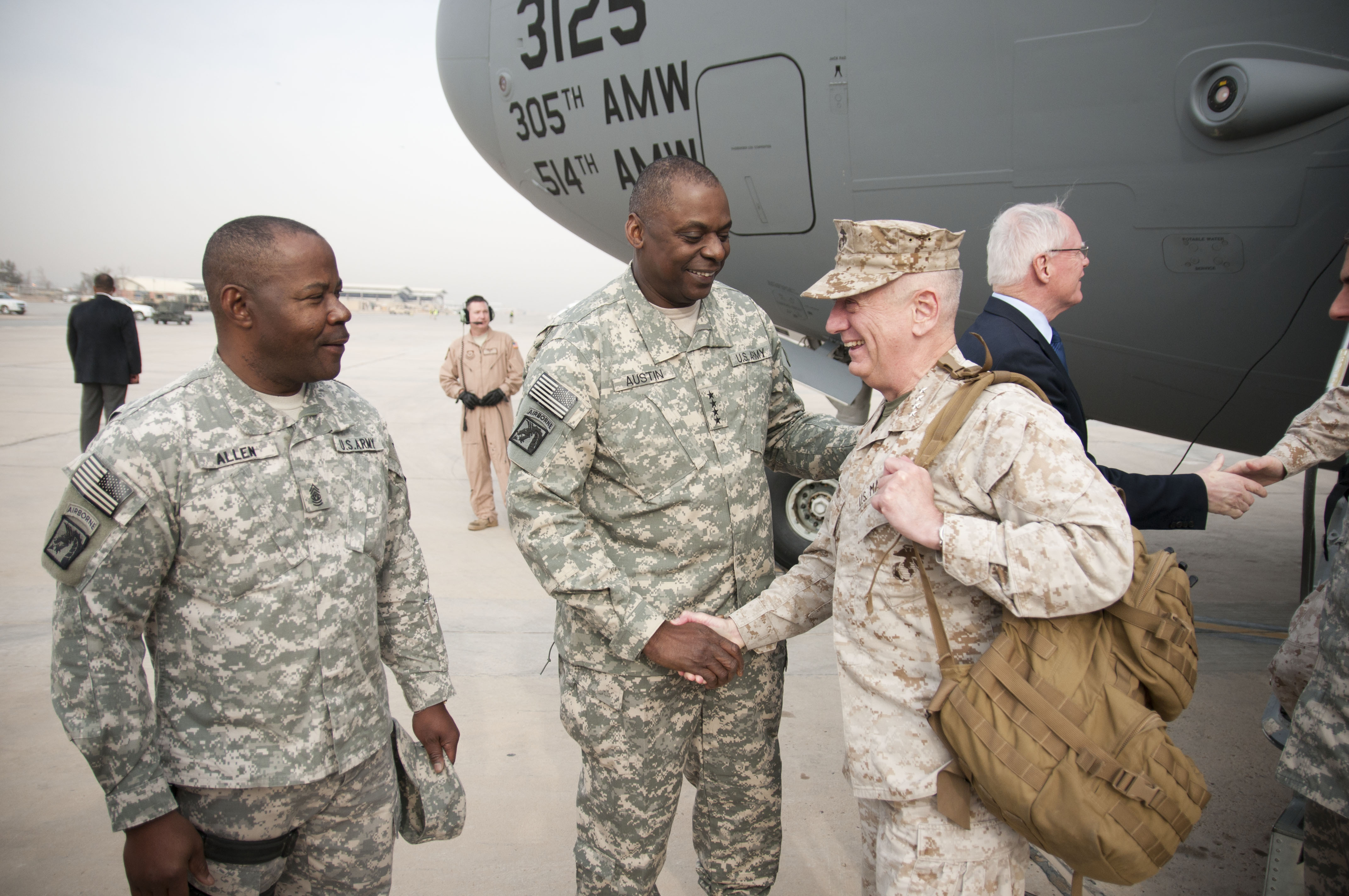
General Lloyd Austin and Command Sgt. Maj. Joseph R. Allen greet Mattis as he arrives in Baghdad for the end-of-mission ceremony in December 2011.

In early 2010, Mattis was reported to be on the list of generals being considered to replace James T. Conway as the commandant of the US Marine Corps. In July, he was recommended by Defense Secretary Robert Gates for nomination to replace David Petraeus as commander of United States Central Command (CENTCOM), and formally nominated by President Obama on July 21.

Mattis took command at a ceremony at MacDill Air Force Base on August 11. As head of Central Command, Mattis oversaw the wars in Iraq and Afghanistan and was responsible for a region that includes Syria, Iran, and Yemen. He lobbied the Obama administration for a more aggressive response to Iran, including more covert operations and disruption of Iranian arms shipments to Syria and Yemen. After an incident in 2011 where an Iranian jet had attacked a U.S. drone flying over the Persian Gulf in international airspace, Mattis wanted permission to shoot down any Iranian aircraft that was attacking American drones, but the Obama administration denied this request. According to Leon Panetta, the Obama administration did not place much trust in Mattis because he was perceived as too eager for a military confrontation with Iran. Panetta later said, though, that some of the mistrust was unjustified, arising from the inexperience of some White House staff not understanding the need "to look at all of the options that a president should look at in order to make the right decisions." Nevertheless, Mattis's hawkishness was out of step with the White House's perspective, and "ultimately, Mattis's advocacy and aggressive style alienated the White House and the president he was serving."

Mattis retired in March 2013, and the Defense Department nominated General Lloyd Austin to succeed him. Sheikh Mohamed bin Zayed al-Nahyan asked Mattis to serve as a military advisor in the Yemen war conflict. During Mattis's tenure as the Secretary of Defense under President Trump, his consultation with the UAE was omitted from public record and financial disclosure. Mattis's relationship with the UAE was strong, featuring a speech in Abu Dhabi initially set to be compensated at $100,000 but later clarified as unpaid.

== Civilian career ==
After retiring from the military, Mattis worked for FWA Consultants and served as a member of the General Dynamics Board of Directors. Between 2013 and 2017, while on the board of General Dynamics, Mattis made more than $900,000 in compensation, including company stock. In August 2013, he was appointed an Annenberg Distinguished Visiting Fellow at the Hoover Institution and in 2016 he was named the Davies Family Distinguished Visiting Fellow.

In December 2015, Mattis joined the advisory board of Spirit of America, a 501(c)(3) nonprofit organization that provides assistance to support the safety and success of American service personnel and the local people they seek to help.

He is co-editor of the book Warriors & Citizens: American Views of Our Military, published in August 2016.

From 2013 to January 2017, Mattis was a board member of Theranos, a health technology company that claimed to have devised revolutionary blood tests using very small amounts of blood, which was later determined to be a fraudulent claim by the US Securities and Exchange Commission. Previously, in mid-2012, a Department of Defense official evaluating Theranos's blood-testing technology for the military initiated a formal inquiry with the Food and Drug Administration about the company's intent to distribute its tests without FDA clearance. In August 2012, Theranos CEO Elizabeth Holmes asked Mattis, who had expressed interest in testing Theranos's technology in combat areas, to help. Within hours, Mattis forwarded his email exchange with Holmes to military officials, asking "how do we overcome this new obstacle". In July 2013, the Department of Defense gave Mattis permission to join Theranos's board provided he did not represent Theranos with regard to the blood-testing device and its potential acquisition by the Departments of the Navy or Defense.

In 2019, Mattis's book Call Sign Chaos: Learning to Lead was published. It is an autobiography as well as an argument in favor of an internationalist foreign policy. On August 7, 2019, Mattis was re-elected to the board of General Dynamics.

== Secretary of Defense (2017–2019) ==
=== Nomination and confirmation ===
Mattis with President Trump and Vice President Pence

President-elect Donald Trump met with Mattis for a little over one hour in Bedminster, New Jersey, on November 20, 2016. He later wrote on Twitter, "General James 'Mad Dog' Mattis, who is being considered for secretary of defense, was very impressive yesterday. A true General's General!" On December 1, 2016, Trump announced at a rally in Cincinnati that he would nominate Mattis for secretary of defense.

The National Security Act of 1947 requires a seven-year waiting period before retired military personnel can assume the role of secretary of defense; Mattis's nomination meant that it was the first time since 1950 (in that instance for George Marshall) that a waiver of the law was needed. The waiver for Mattis passed 81–17 in the Senate and 268–151 in the House. Mattis was subsequently confirmed as secretary of defense by a vote of 98–1 in the United States Senate on January 20, 2017. Senator Kirsten Gillibrand was the sole "no" vote, stating that she was opposed to the waiver on principle.

=== Tenure ===
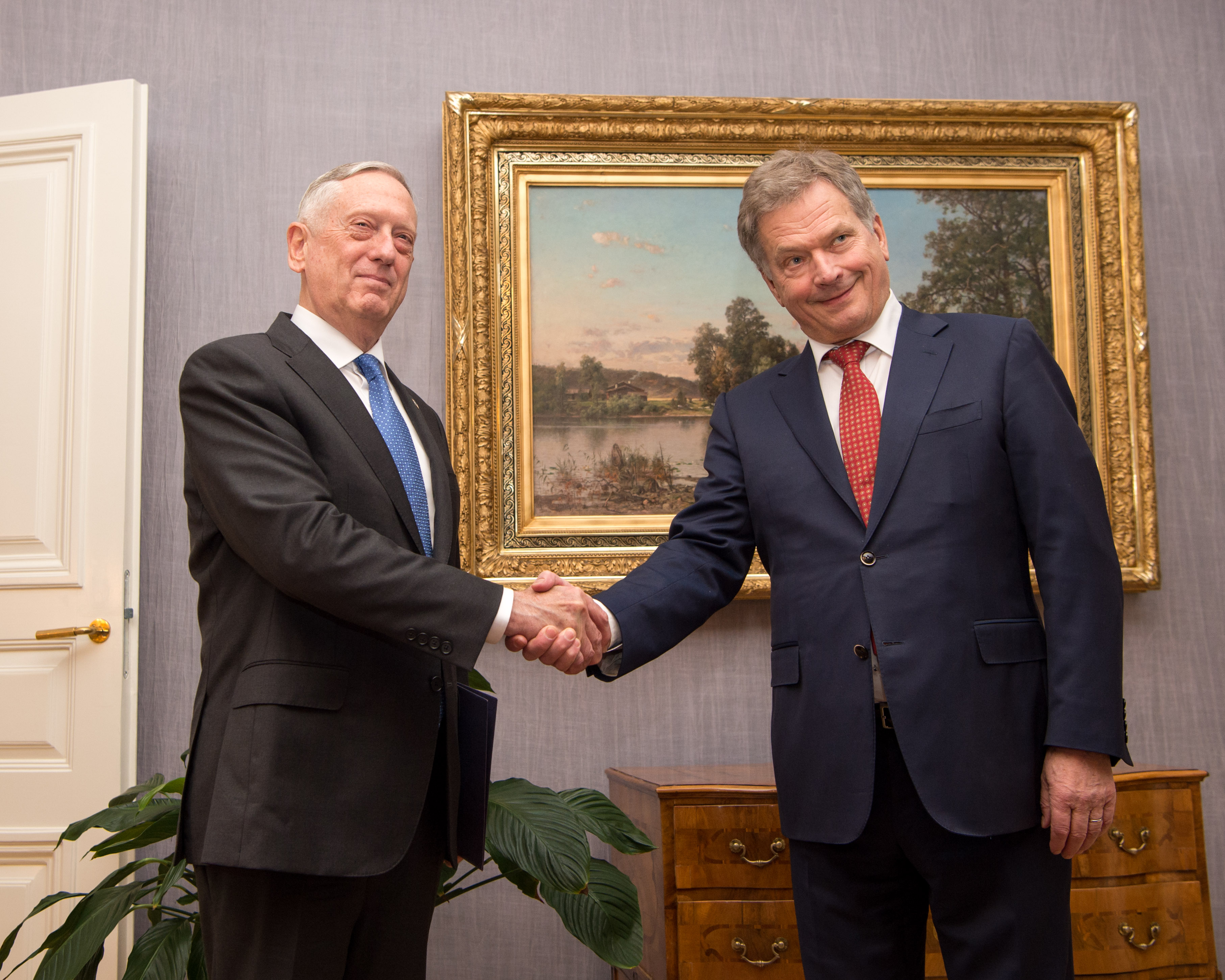
Mattis with Finnish president Sauli Niinistö in Helsinki, Finland, in November 2017

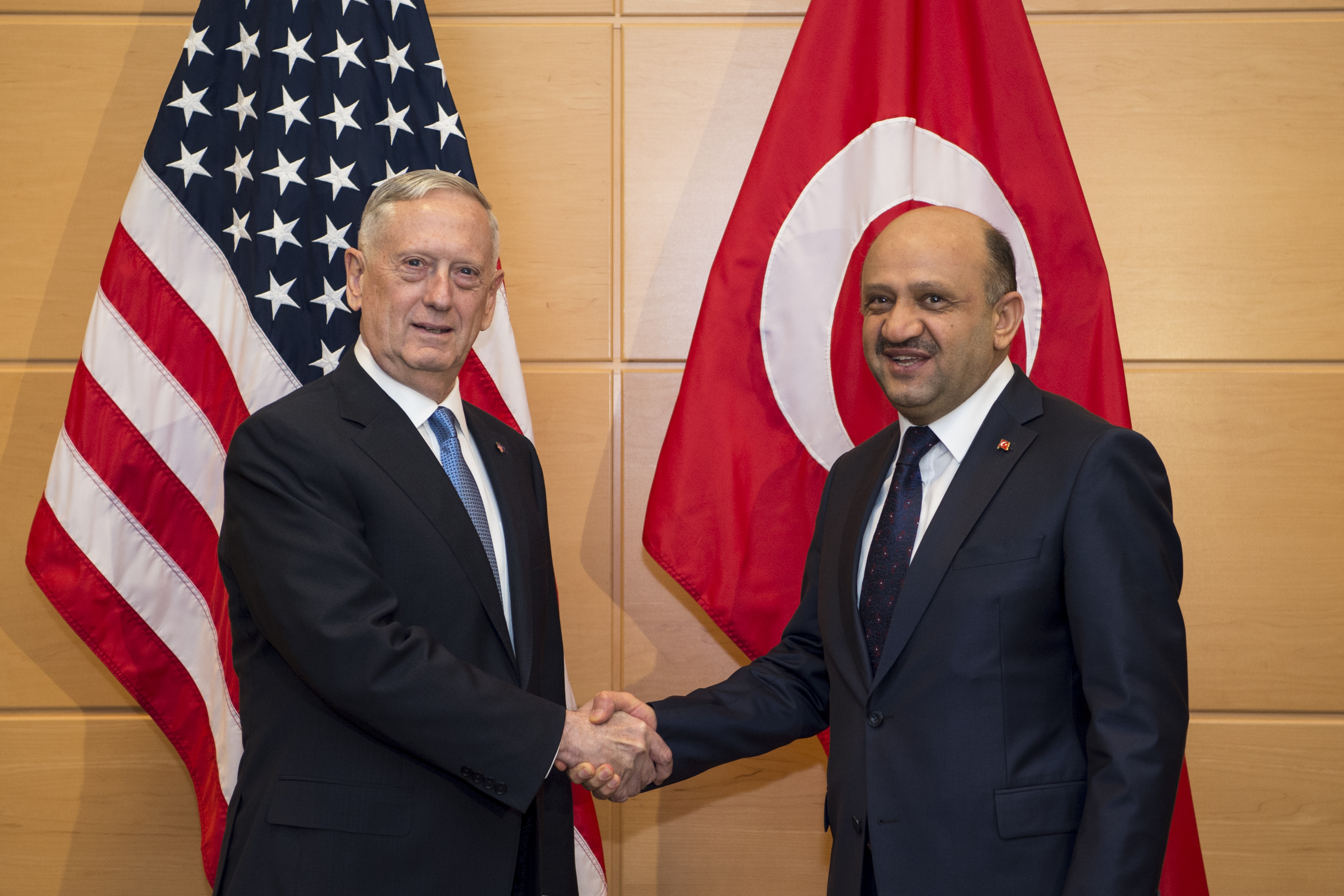
Mattis and Turkish Defense Minister Fikri Işık at NATO headquarters in Brussels, February 2017

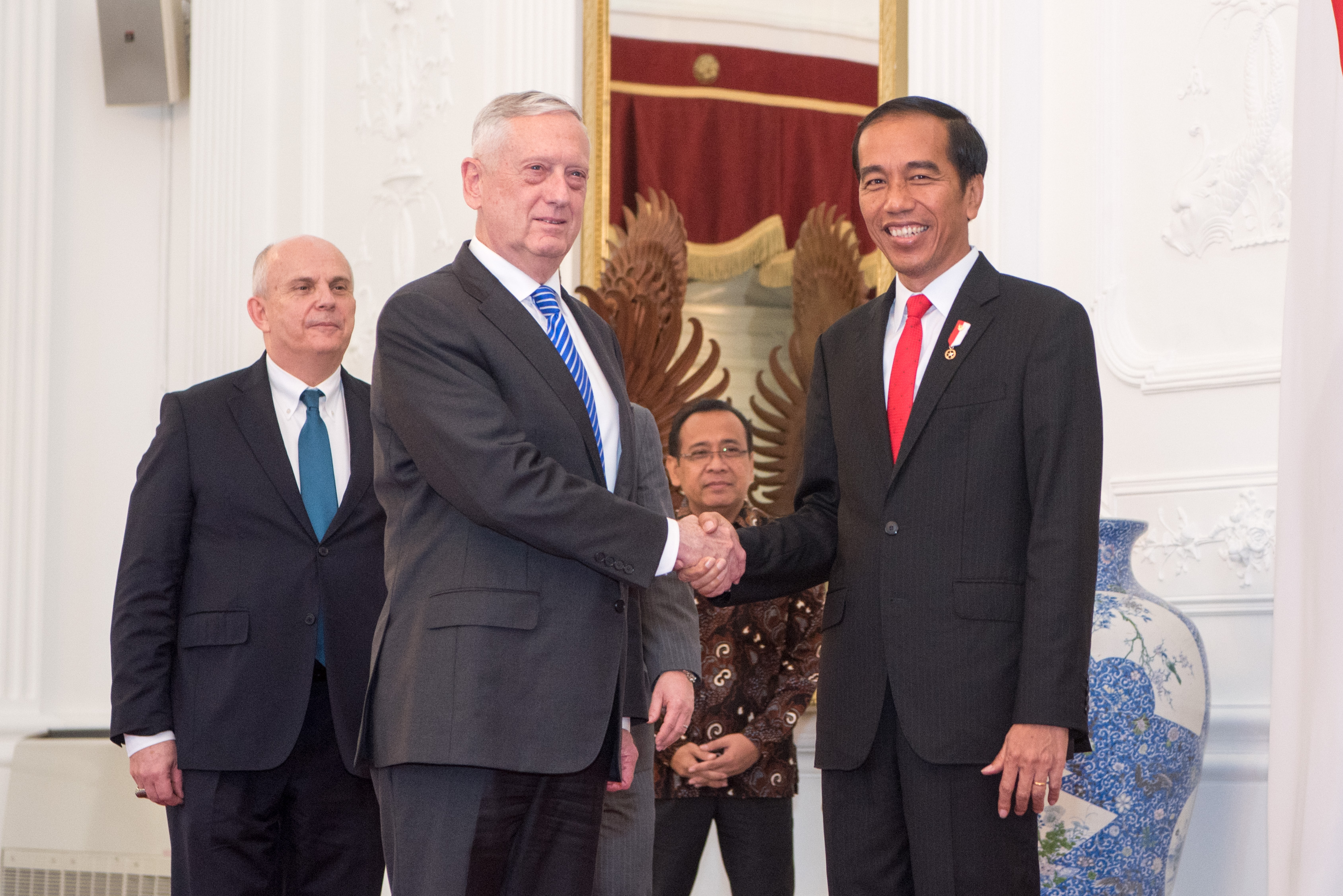
Mattis with Indonesian president Joko Widodo during a visit to Jakarta, Indonesia, in January 2018.

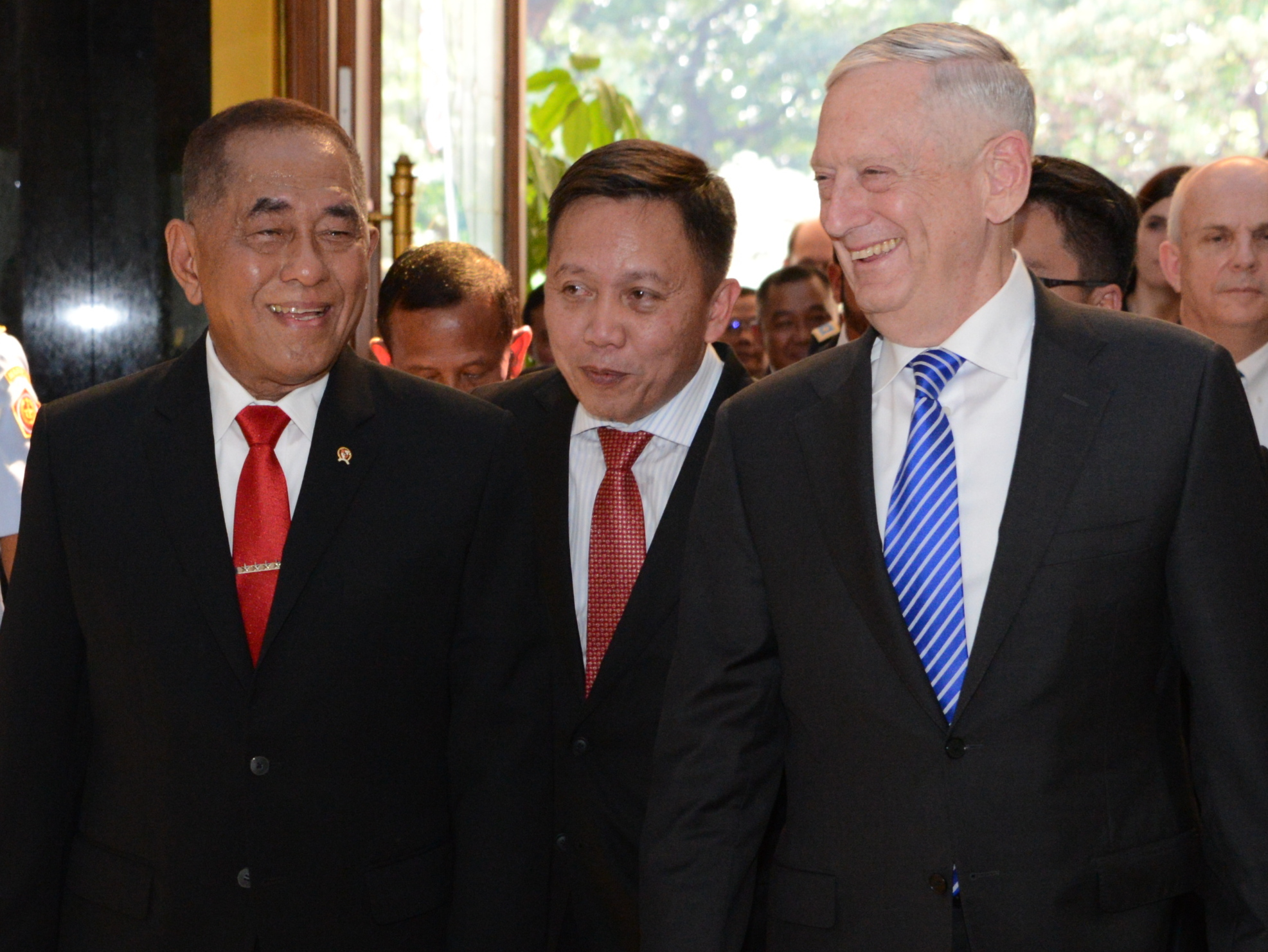
Mattis with Indonesian Defense Minister Ryamizard Ryacudu and interpreter Iroth Sonny Edhie.

In a January 2017 phone call with Saudi Arabia's deputy crown prince Mohammed bin Salman, Mattis "reaffirmed the importance of the US–Saudi Arabia strategic relationship".

For his first official trip abroad, Mattis began a two-day visit with longtime US ally South Korea on February 2, 2017. He warned North Korea that "any attack on the United States, or our allies, will be defeated", and any use of nuclear weapons would be met with an "effective and overwhelming" response from the United States. During a press conference in London on March 31, 2017, with the British secretary of state for defence, Michael Fallon, Mattis said North Korea was behaving "in a very reckless manner" and must be stopped. During a Pentagon news conference on May 26, Mattis reported the US was working with the UN, China, Japan, and South Korea to avoid "a military solution" with North Korea. On June 3, Mattis said the United States regarded North Korea as "clear and present danger" during a speech at the international security conference in Singapore. In a June 12 written statement to the House Armed Services Committee Mattis said North Korea was the "most urgent and dangerous threat to peace and security". On June 15, Mattis said the US would win a war against North Korea, but "at great cost".

On March 22, 2017, during questioning from the US Senate, Mattis affirmed his support for US troops remaining in Iraq after the Battle of Mosul was concluded. Mattis responded to critics who suggested the Trump administration had loosened the rules of engagement for the US military in Iraq after US-led coalition airstrikes in Mosul killed civilians, saying, "We go out of our way to always do everything humanly possible to reduce the loss of life or injury among innocent people." According to Airwars, the US-led coalition killed as many as 6,000 civilians in Iraq and Syria in 2017.

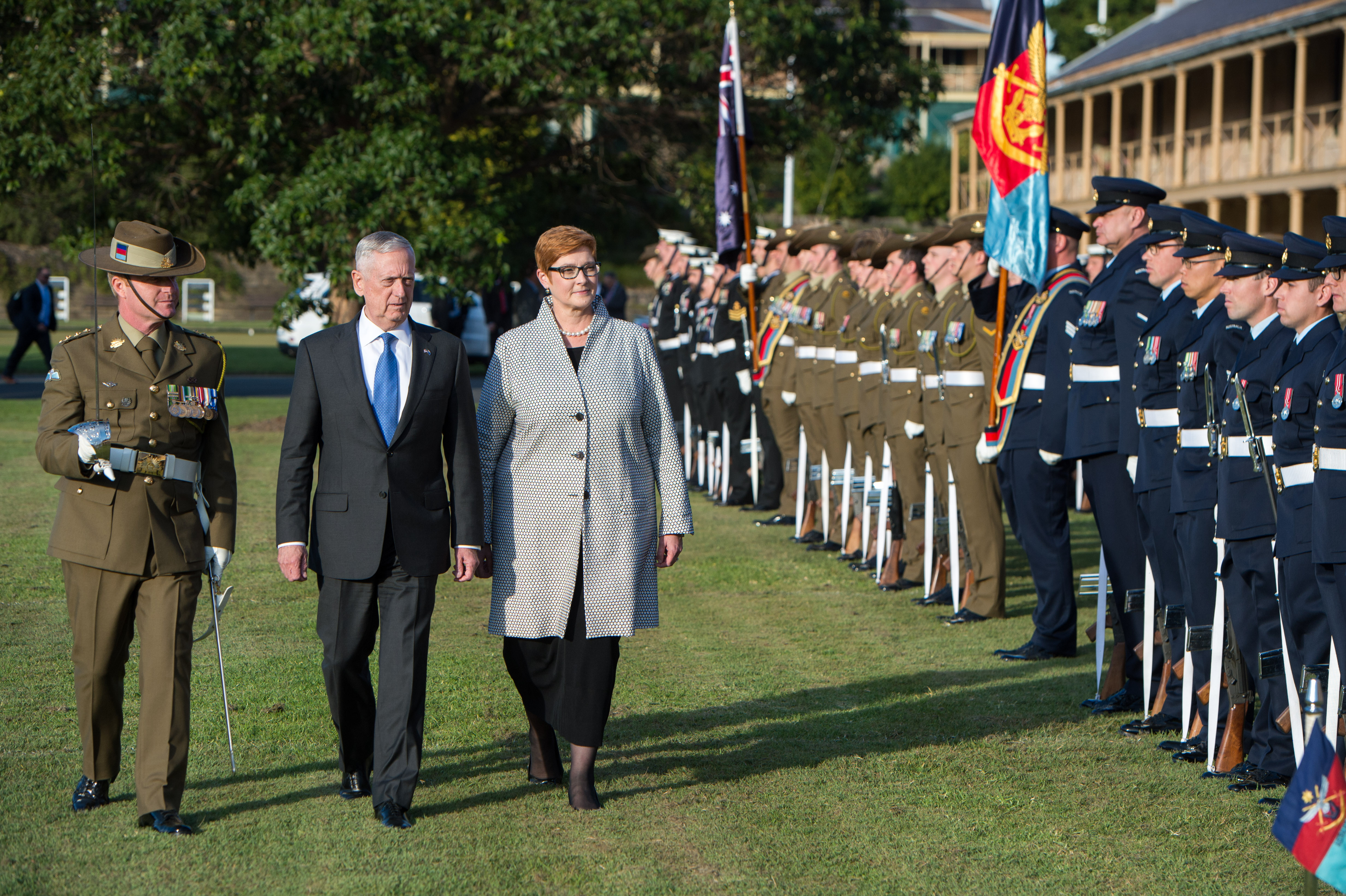
Mattis and Australian Minister for Defense Marise Payne visiting Victoria Barracks in Sydney, Australia, June 2017.

On April 5, 2017, Mattis called the Khan Shaykhun chemical attack "a heinous act", and said it would be treated accordingly. On April 10, Mattis warned the Syrian government against using chemical weapons again. The following day, Mattis gave his first Pentagon news conference since becoming secretary of defense, saying ISIL's defeat remained "our priority", and the Syrian government would pay a "very, very stiff price" for further usage of chemical weapons. On April 21 Mattis said Syria still had chemical weapons and was in violation of United Nations Security Council resolutions. According to investigative journalist Bob Woodward, Trump ordered Mattis to assassinate Assad, but Mattis refused. On May 8 Mattis told reporters details of the proposed Syrian safe zones were "all in process right now" and the United States was involved with configuring them.

Mattis voiced support for a Saudi Arabian-led military campaign against Yemen's Shiite rebels. He asked Trump to remove restrictions on US military support for Saudi Arabia.

On April 20, 2017, one week after the Nangarhar airstrike, Mattis told reporters that the US would not conduct a damage assessment "in terms of the number of people killed" in Afghanistan. Mattis traveled to Afghanistan days later and met with government officials, explaining that the purpose of the trip was to allow him to state his recommendations for US strategy in the country. On June 13, Mattis said US forces were "not winning" in Afghanistan and the administration would develop a new strategy by "mid-July" while speaking to the United States Senate Committee on Armed Services. On June 29, Mattis said the Obama administration "may have pulled our troops out too rapidly" and that he intended to submit a new Afghanistan strategy to Trump upon his return to Washington, D.C.

The United States has been openly arming the Syrian Kurdish fighters in the war against ISIL since May 2017. Following the start of the Turkish invasion of northern Syria aimed at ousting US-backed Syrian Kurds from the enclave of Afrin, Mattis said in January 2018: "Turkey is a NATO ally. It's the only NATO country with an active insurgency inside its borders. And Turkey has legitimate security concerns." Turkish Deputy Prime Minister Bekir Bozdağ urged the United States to halt its support for Kurdish YPG fighters, saying: "Those who support the terrorist organization will become a target in this battle."

On April 13, 2018, Mattis briefed reporters in a press conference at the Pentagon on the 2018 missile strikes against Syria being carried out against the Assad regime's chemical weapon compounds, saying, "Tonight, France, the United Kingdom and the United States took decisive action to strike the Syrian chemical weapons infrastructure. Clearly the Assad regime did not get the message last year. This time our allies and we have struck harder. Together we have sent a clear message to Assad and his murderous lieutenants that they should not perpetrate another chemical weapons attack for which they will be held accountable".

In November 2018, the CIA assessed with "high confidence" that Saudi Arabia's Crown Prince Mohammad bin Salman ordered the assassination of Washington Post columnist Jamal Khashoggi. Under mounting pressure from lawmakers who wanted action against Saudi Arabia, Mattis and Secretary of State Mike Pompeo, in a rare closed briefing of the Senate, disputed the CIA's conclusion and declared there was no direct evidence linking the crown prince to Khashoggi's assassination.

Wherever Mattis traveled overseas, he brought the Defense Security Cooperation Agency director (the official in charge of weapon sales to foreign governments), according to Lt. Gen. Charles Hooper, speaking at the Brookings Institution in June 2019.

=== Conflicts with Trump and resignation ===
Mattis's resignation letter

Mattis had recommended General David L. Goldfein, Air Force Chief of Staff, to succeed retiring General Joseph Dunford as Chairman of the Joint Chiefs of Staff in September 2018. Instead, Trump chose General Mark Milley, Army Chief of Staff, whom Mattis had recommended for the position of Supreme Allied Commander Europe.

On December 19, 2018, Trump announced immediate US withdrawal from Syria, over his national security advisers' objections. Mattis had recently said that the US would remain in Syria after ISIL's defeat to ensure it did not regroup. The next day, he submitted his resignation after failing to persuade Trump to reconsider. His resignation letter contained language that appeared to criticize Trump's worldview—praising NATO, which Trump has often derided, and the 79-nation anti-ISIS coalition that Trump had decided to leave. Mattis also affirmed the need for "treating allies with respect and also being clear-eyed about both malign actors and strategic competitors" and remaining "resolute and unambiguous" against authoritarian states such as China and Russia. He wrote that Trump has "the right to have a Secretary of Defense whose views are better aligned with [his] on these and other subjects." His resignation triggered alarm among historical allies. In his 2018 resignation letter, Mattis called both Russia and China "authoritarian models" rivaling US interests. Mattis's letter said his resignation would be effective February 28, 2019. Three days later Trump moved Mattis's departure date up to January 1, after becoming angered by the implicit criticism of Trump's worldview in Mattis's letter. On January 2, 2019, Trump criticized Mattis's performance as secretary of defense and said he had "essentially fired him".

John F. Kelly, Trump's chief of staff when Mattis left his position, denied that Trump fired Mattis or asked for his resignation. He said Trump must be confused or mistaken, and that "Jim Mattis is an honorable man". Mattis returned to his post as Davies Family Distinguished Fellow at the Hoover Institution.

=== Post-tenure ===
After leaving the White House, Mattis initially declined to offer his opinion of the Trump administration, saying, "If you leave an administration, you owe some silence," and was guarded when asked to reflect on Trump or military matters, saying he didn't want to detract from the troops. He changed his position after becoming "angry and appalled" about the events leading up to the violent treatment of noncombative protesters near the White House on June 1, 2020, for the purpose of a photo op for Trump at the church across Lafayette Square. Trump responded by Twitter that evening that he "felt great" he had previously asked Mattis to resign, and he didn't like much about Mattis or his "leadership style" and was "Glad he is gone!"

In 2019, Mattis joined The Cohen Group as senior counsel.

Mattis, along with all other living former secretaries of defense, ten in total, published a Washington Post op-ed piece in January 2021 telling President Trump not to involve the military in determining the outcome of the 2020 elections.

In his biography, former NATO secretary general Jens Stoltenberg writes that Mattis said to him when he was secretary of defense "You know, Jens, I have a strange job. I get up in the morning. I read the newspaper, and if it doesn't say that I've been fired, then I go to the office." Mattis also said "we are ashamed" of Trump and his behavior.

==== Al Smith Dinner comments ====
At the October 17, 2019, Alfred E. Smith Memorial Foundation Dinner, Mattis, the keynote speaker, responded to comments Trump had made about him, saying,

I'm not just an overrated general, I am the greatest, the world's most overrated ... I'm honored to be considered that by Donald Trump, because he also called Meryl Streep an overrated actress. So I guess I'm the Meryl Streep of generals, and frankly, that sounds pretty good to me. And you do have to admit that between me and Meryl, at least we've had some victories.

He continued, "I've earned my spurs on the battlefield ... Donald Trump earned his spurs in a letter from a doctor."

== Political positions ==
Mattis claimed he has "never registered for any political party". He also claimed that as a member of the U.S. military, he was "proudly apolitical".

Mattis said in 2020 that Donald Trump is "the first president in my lifetime who does not try to unite the American people — does not even pretend to try. Instead he tries to divide us." After the January 6 attack, Mattis said Trump used the presidency to "destroy trust in our election and to poison our respect for fellow citizens." In 2024, after former chairman of the Joint Chiefs of Staff Mark Milley called Trump "fascist to the core" and "the most dangerous person ever", author Bob Woodward said Mattis had emailed him to second Milley's assessment.

=== Israeli–Palestinian peace process ===
Mattis supports a two-state solution model for Israeli–Palestinian peace. He has said the situation in Israel is "unsustainable" and that Israeli settlements harm prospects for peace and could lead to an apartheid-like situation in the West Bank. In particular, he has said that the perception of biased American support for Israel has made it difficult for moderate Arabs to show support for the United States. Mattis strongly supported Secretary of State John Kerry on the Middle East peace process, praising Kerry for being "wisely focused like a laser beam" on a two-state solution.

=== Iran and Middle Eastern allies ===
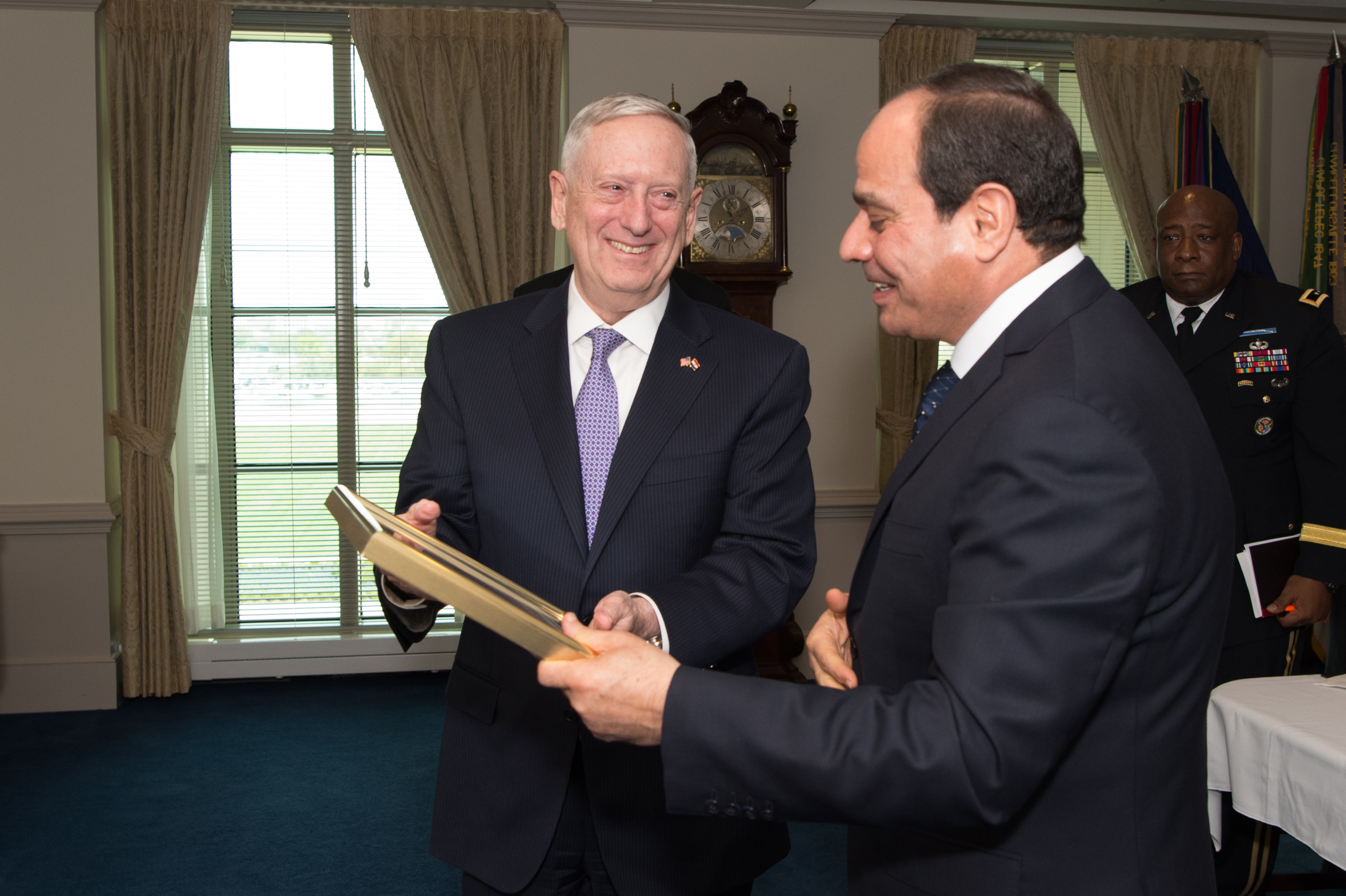
Mattis and Egyptian President Abdel Fattah el-Sisi in April 2017

Mattis believes Iran is the principal threat to the stability of the Middle East, ahead of Al-Qaeda and ISIL. Mattis says: "I consider ISIS nothing more than an excuse for Iran to continue its mischief. Iran is not an enemy of ISIS. They have a lot to gain from the turmoil in the region that ISIS creates." Mattis sees the Iran nuclear deal as a poor agreement, but believes there is now no way to tear it up, saying: "We are just going to have to recognize that we have an imperfect arms control agreement. Second, that what we achieved is a nuclear pause, not a nuclear halt". Mattis argues that inspections may fail to prevent Iran from seeking to develop nuclear weapons, but that "[i]f nothing else at least we will have better-targeting data if it comes to a fight in the future." Additionally, he criticized Obama for being "naive" about Iranian intentions and Congress for being "pretty much absent" on the nuclear deal.

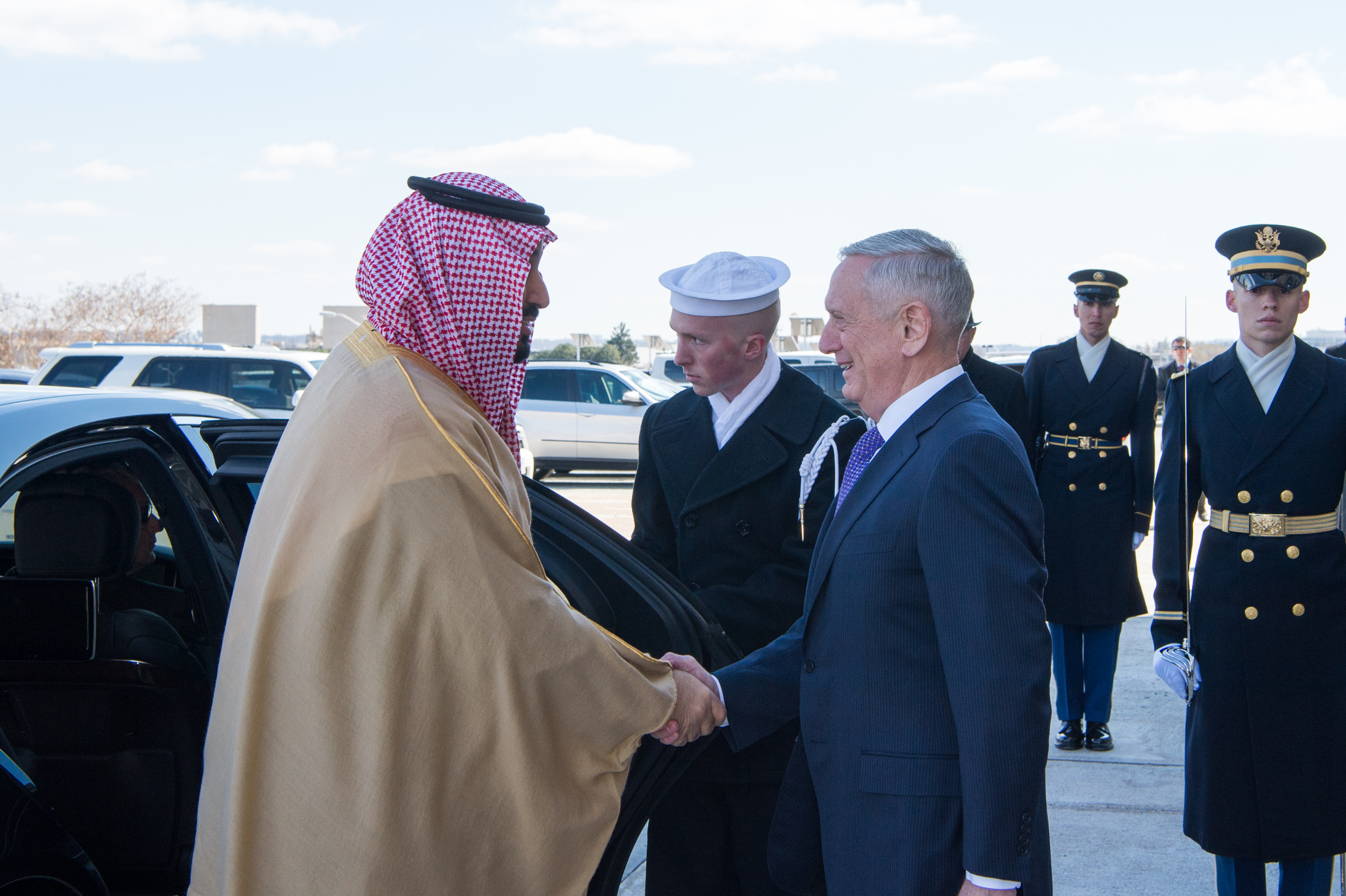
Mattis with Saudi Arabia's prince Mohammad in March 2017

Mattis praises the friendship of regional US allies such as Jordan, Israel, and the United Arab Emirates. He also criticized Obama for seeing allies as "freeloading", saying: "For a sitting US President to see our allies as freeloaders is nuts." He has cited the importance of the United Arab Emirates and Jordan as countries that wanted to help, for example, in filling in the gaps in Afghanistan. He criticized Obama's defense strategy as giving "the perception we're pulling back" from US allies. He stresses the need for the US to bolster its ties with allied intelligence agencies, particularly those of Jordan, Egypt and Saudi Arabia. In 2012, Mattis argued for providing weapons to Syrian rebels as a way to fight back against Iranian proxies in Syria.

=== Japan ===
Mattis visited Japan one week after being sworn in as secretary of defense. During a meeting with Prime Minister Shinzō Abe, Mattis emphasized that the US remains committed to the mutual defense of Japan and stated, "I want there to be no misunderstanding during the transition in Washington that we stand firmly, 100 percent, shoulder to shoulder with you and the Japanese people." He also reassured Japan that the US would defend the disputed Senkaku Islands controlled by Japan but also claimed by China and Taiwan.

=== Russia ===
Speaking at a 2015 conference sponsored by The Heritage Foundation in Washington, D.C., Mattis said he believed that Russian President Vladimir Putin's intent is "to break NATO apart". Mattis has also spoken out against what he perceives as Russia's expansionist or bellicose policies in Syria, Ukraine and the Baltic states. In 2017, Mattis said that the world order is "under the biggest attack since World War II, ... and that is from Russia, from terrorist groups, and with what China is doing in the South China Sea.

On February 16, 2017, Mattis said the United States was not currently prepared to collaborate with Russia on military matters, including future anti-ISIL US operations. In August 2017, he said: "Despite Russia's denials, we know they are seeking to redraw international borders by force, undermining the sovereign and free nations of Europe".

On July 1, 2022, he described the Russian invasion of Ukraine as "immoral, the tactically incompetent, operationally stupid and strategically foolish effort". He added that Vladimir Putin "probably thought that the Ukrainian people were going to welcome him."

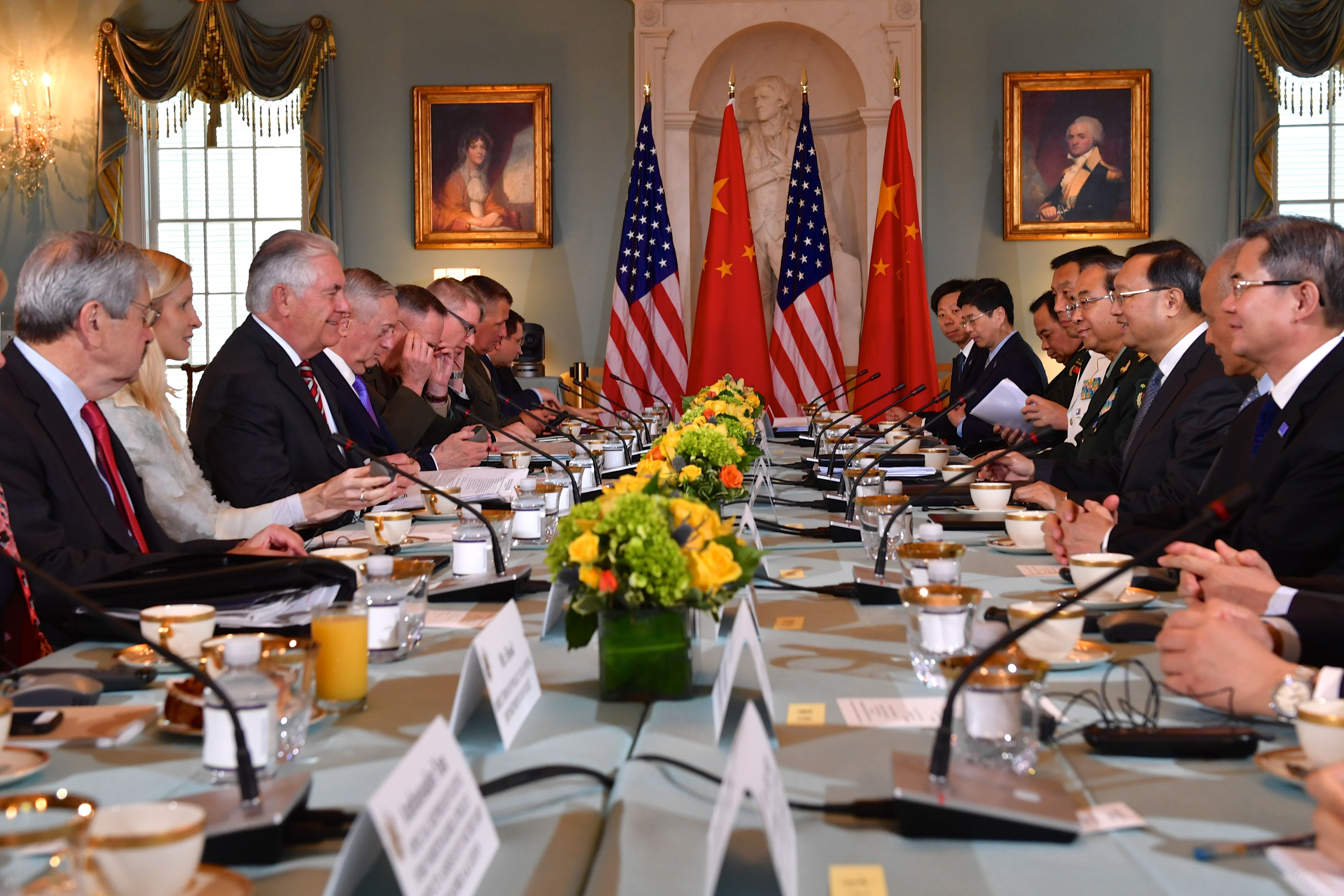
Mattis and Tillerson with Chinese General Fang Fenghui and State Councilor Yang Jiechi, June 2017

=== China ===
Mattis called for freedom of navigation in the South China Sea and criticized China's island-building activities, saying: "The bottom line is ... the international waters are international waters."

=== Climate change ===
In 2017, Mattis said that budget cuts would hamper the ability to monitor the effects of global warming, and noted, "climate change is a challenge that requires a broader, whole-of-government response." He also told senators "climate change is impacting stability in areas of the world where our troops are operating today."

=== 2020 George Floyd protests ===
On June 3, 2020, Mattis issued a statement to The Atlantic in which he criticized President Donald Trump and his policies during the George Floyd protests. He berated Trump for deliberately trying to cause division among the American people and advocating military action to "dominate" the country's protests. "Militarizing our response, as we witnessed in Washington, D.C., sets up a conflict—a false conflict—between the military and civilian society, and diminishes the trust and constitutional relationship between the armed services and the civilian population they support", he wrote. Mattis called for reunification among the people, regardless of the president, to preserve the welfare of society, and its future.

Mattis wrote that Trump was "the first president in my lifetime who does not try to unite the American people—does not even pretend to try. Instead, he tries to divide us". He added that America is "witnessing the consequences of three years without mature leadership". He called for accountability for "those in office who would make a mockery of our Constitution". He concluded, "Only by adopting a new path—which means, in truth, returning to the original path of our founding ideals—will we again be a country admired and respected at home and abroad."

== Personal life ==
A bachelor for his entire professional career, a now-retired Mattis married physicist and business executive Christina Lomasney in June 2022. He has no children. He had previously proposed to a woman, but the wedding was called off three days before it was to occur, after colleagues talked him out of leaving the Marine Corps for her. He was nicknamed "The Warrior Monk" because of his bachelorhood and lifelong devotion to the study of war. An avid reader, he has 7,000 books in his private library, and has recommended Marcus Aurelius's Meditations as the one book every American should read.

Mattis was inducted into the Sons of the American Revolution on July 13, 2021.

Mattis is a Catholic, and has been described as "devout" and "committed". During the 2003 Iraq invasion, he often prayed with general John F. Kelly on Sundays. The Trump transition team's formal biography of Mattis described him as "the living embodiment of the Marine Corps motto, Semper Fidelis." He has declined when asked by reporters to discuss his faith in public. In a 2003 PBS interview, Mattis recalled how his Marines followed advice from his chaplain on gaining the support of Iraqi citizens:

On the suggestion of my Catholic chaplain the Marines would take chilled drinking water in bottles and walk out amongst the protesters and hand it out. It is just hard to throw a rock at somebody who has given you a cold drink of water and it's 120 degrees outside.

== Military awards ==
Mattis's decorations, awards, and badges include, among others:

1st row	Defense Distinguished Service Medal w/ one oak leaf cluster (two awards)	Navy Distinguished Service Medal	Defense Superior Service Medal	Legion of Merit
2nd row	Bronze Star Medal w/ Combat "V"	Meritorious Service Medal w/ two 5/16" Gold Stars (three awards)	Navy and Marine Corps Achievement Medal	Combat Action Ribbon
3rd row	Navy and Marine Corps Presidential Unit Citation	Joint Meritorious Unit Award	Navy Unit Commendation	Navy and Marine Corps Meritorious Unit Commendation
4th row	Marine Corps Expeditionary Medal	National Defense Service Medal w/ two 3/16" bronze stars (three awards)	Southwest Asia Service Medal w/ two 3/16" bronze stars (three awards)	Afghanistan Campaign Medal w/ one 3/16" bronze star (two campaigns)
5th row	Iraq Campaign Medal w/ one 3/16" bronze star (two campaigns)	Global War on Terrorism Expeditionary Medal	Global War on Terrorism Service Medal	Humanitarian Service Medal
6th row	Sea Service Ribbon w/ one 3/16" silver star and two 3/16" bronze stars (eight awards)	Marine Corps Recruiting Service Ribbon w/ one 3/16" bronze star (two awards)	Polish Army Medal in gold	NATO Meritorious Service Medal
7th row	NATO Medal for Service with ISAF	Meritorious Service Cross from Canada in 2013	Kuwait Liberation Medal (Saudi Arabia)	Kuwait Liberation Medal (Kuwait)
Badges	Rifle Expert Badge (4th award)		Pistol Expert Badge (2nd award)	
Badge	Office of the Secretary of Defense Identification Badge			

=== Meritorious Service Cross citation ===
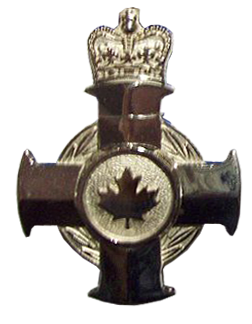

"While occupying key leadership positions within the United States Armed Forces and NATO between 2001 and 2012, General Mattis directly and repeatedly contributed to the Canadian Forces' operational success in Afghanistan. Providing unprecedented access and championing Canadian participation in critical policy and training events, he helped shape Canadian counter-insurgency doctrine. Demonstrating unequivocal support and unwavering commitment to Canada, General Mattis has significantly strengthened Canadian-American relations and has been a critical enabler in both countries' shared achievements in Afghanistan."

== Civilian awards ==
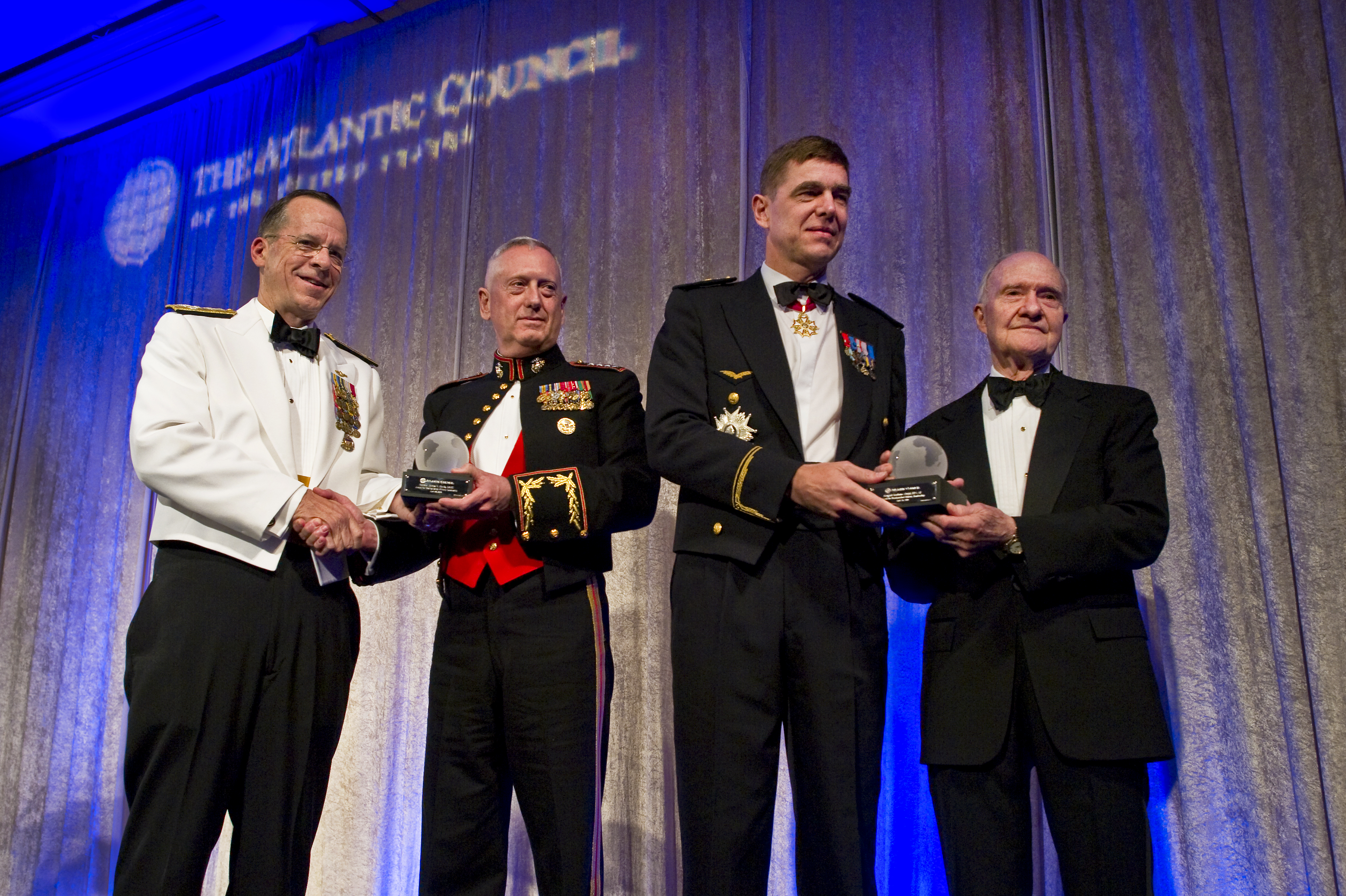
Mattis receiving the Distinguished Military Leadership Award from Michael Mullen at the annual Atlantic Council Awards Gala in Washington, D.C.

Mattis's civilian awards include:

- 2009: Center for National Policy's Edmund S. Muskie Distinguished Public Service Award
- 2010: Atlantic Council's Distinguished Military Leadership Award
- 2013: World Affairs Council of Greater Hampton Roads "Ryan C. Crocker Global Citizen of the Year" Award
- 2014: Marine Corps University Foundation Semper Fidelis Award
- 2014: Washington College honorary doctor of laws degree
- 2016: Washington Policy Center Champion of Freedom Award recipient
- 2021: Elected as a member of the American Academy of Arts and Sciences
- 2021: Honorary Companion of the Order of Australia

== In popular culture ==
- Mattis is the primary subject of Guy Snodgrass's 2019 book Holding the Line: Inside Trump's Pentagon with Secretary Mattis.
- Robert John Burke portrays Mattis in the 2008 HBO miniseries Generation Kill, which depicts the 2003 invasion of Iraq.
- Mattis is also known for the Internet meme depicting him as "Saint Mattis of Quantico, Patron Saint of Chaos".
- Mattis is commonly "reported on" by the military satire website Duffel Blog for potentially being fired, winning an "arms race" with Russia, and crossing the Potomac to launch a Roman-style coup d'état.
- Mattis is an avid reader and releases his reading lists.

== See also ==
- List of United States Marine Corps four-star generals

Military offices
Preceded by James T. Conway	Commanding General of the 1st Marine Division; 2002–2004	Succeeded by Richard F. Natonski
Preceded by Edward Hanlon Jr.	Deputy Commandant for Combat Development and Integration of the United States Marine Corps; 2005–2006	Succeeded by James F. Amos
Preceded by Edward Hanlon Jr.	Commanding General of the Marine Corps Combat Development Command; 2005–2006	Succeeded by James F. Amos
Preceded by John F. Sattler	Commanding General of the I Marine Expeditionary Force; 2006–2007	Succeeded by Samuel T. Helland
Preceded by John F. Sattler	Commander of the United States Marine Forces Central Command; 2006–2007	Succeeded by Samuel T. Helland
Preceded by Lance L. Smith	Supreme Allied Commander Transformation; 2007–2009	Succeeded by Stéphane Abrial
Preceded by Lance L. Smith	Commander of United States Joint Forces Command; 2007–2010	Succeeded by Keith Huber; Acting
Preceded by John R. Allen; Acting	Commander of United States Central Command; 2010–2013	Succeeded by Lloyd Austin
Political offices
Preceded by Ash Carter	United States Secretary of Defense; 2017–2019	Succeeded by Patrick M. Shanahan; Acting
U.S. order of precedence (ceremonial)
Preceded by John King Jr. as Former U.S. Cabinet Member	Order of precedence of the United States as Former U.S. Cabinet Member	Succeeded by John F. Kelly as Former U.S. Cabinet Member
