= Iroth Sonny Edhie =

Indonesian army general

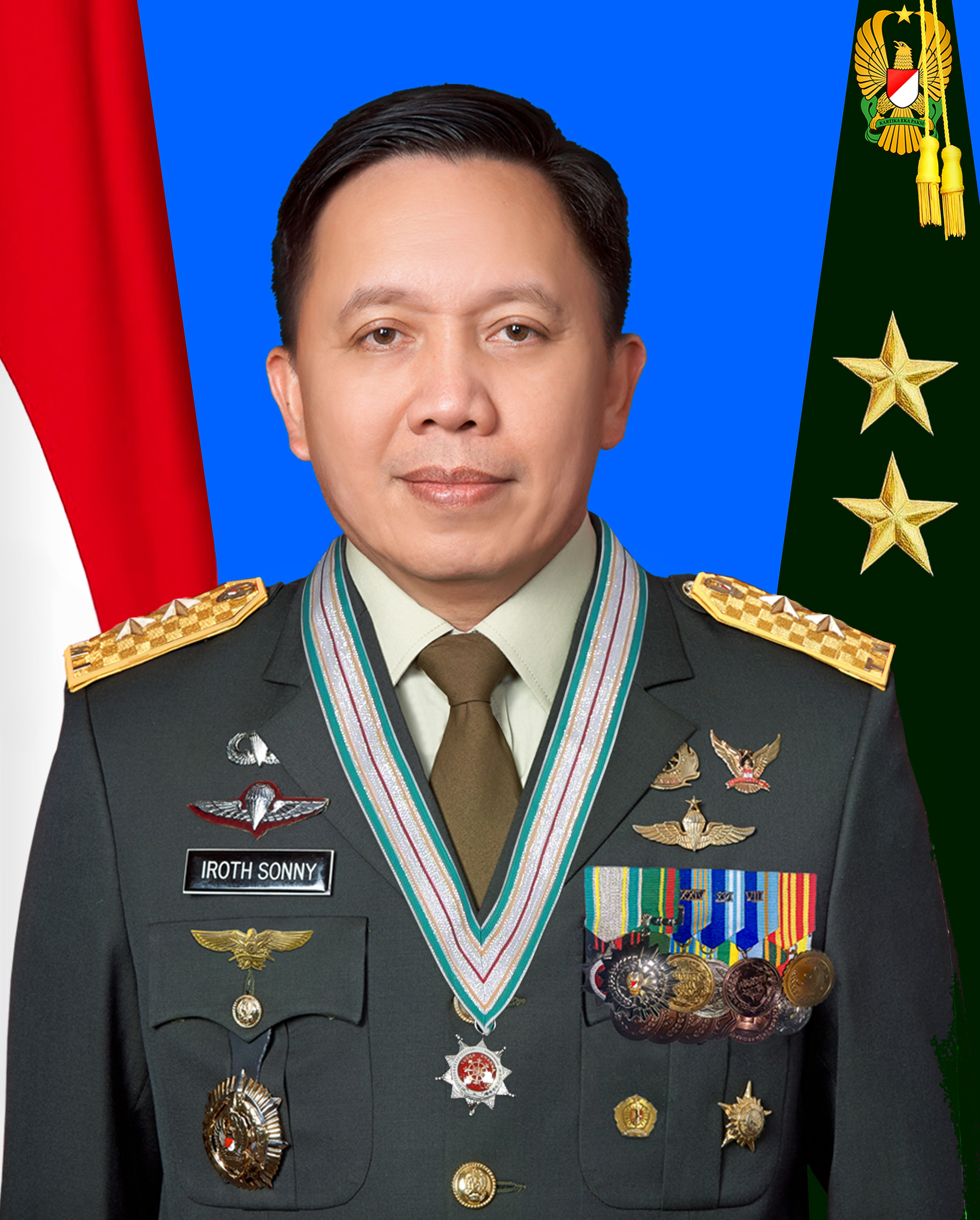
- Born: July 15, 1971 (age 55)
- Spouse: Alexandra Henny Darmastuti
- Children: 2
- Military career
- Allegiance: Indonesia
- Branch: Indonesian Army
- Service years: 1993–present
- Rank: Major general
- Unit: Signal Corps
- Commands: Army Cyber and Crypto Center; Signal Corps

Iroth Sonny Edhie (born 15 July 1971) is an Indonesian army general who is currently serving as the Chief of the Indonesian Army Signal Corps. He served in the position since 17 November 2023. Prior to his assignment, he held various positions in the Army Strategic Reserve Command and the Ministry of Defence, including as an interpreter for defense minister Ryamizard Ryacudu.

== Career ==
Edhie was born on 15 July 1971. He began his career in the army after graduating from the Indonesian Military Academy in 1993 and attending the basic signal course in 1994. He was assigned to the Army Strategic Reserve Command, where he held a variety of positions from platoon to company commander. Throughout his time, Edhie attended a variety of military courses, both in Indonesia and overseas. He was appointed as the commander of the signal company in the 1st Army Strategic Reserve Command in December 1999 and served until July 2002.

Edhie was transferred to the Armed Forces Strategic Intelligence Body for two years. Afterwards, he was reassigned to the Indonesian embassy in London, where he became the assistant military attaché in the embassy. He was in the position for three years until December 2007 and returned to the Armed Forces Strategic Intelligence Body.

Edhie received a promotion to the rank of lieutenant colonel in 2010 and underwent another overseas posting at the Permanent Mission of the Republic of Indonesia to the United Nations. He respectively became assistant for public affairs and deputy military adviser at the mission. He completed his duty at the permanent mission in 2014 and became the interpreter to defence minister Ryamizard Ryacudu. After Ryacudu's term as minister ended, Edhie was reposted to the ministry's secretariat general on 11 February 2019, where he became the chief of administration and protocol. He was promoted to the rank of brigadier general on 27 February.

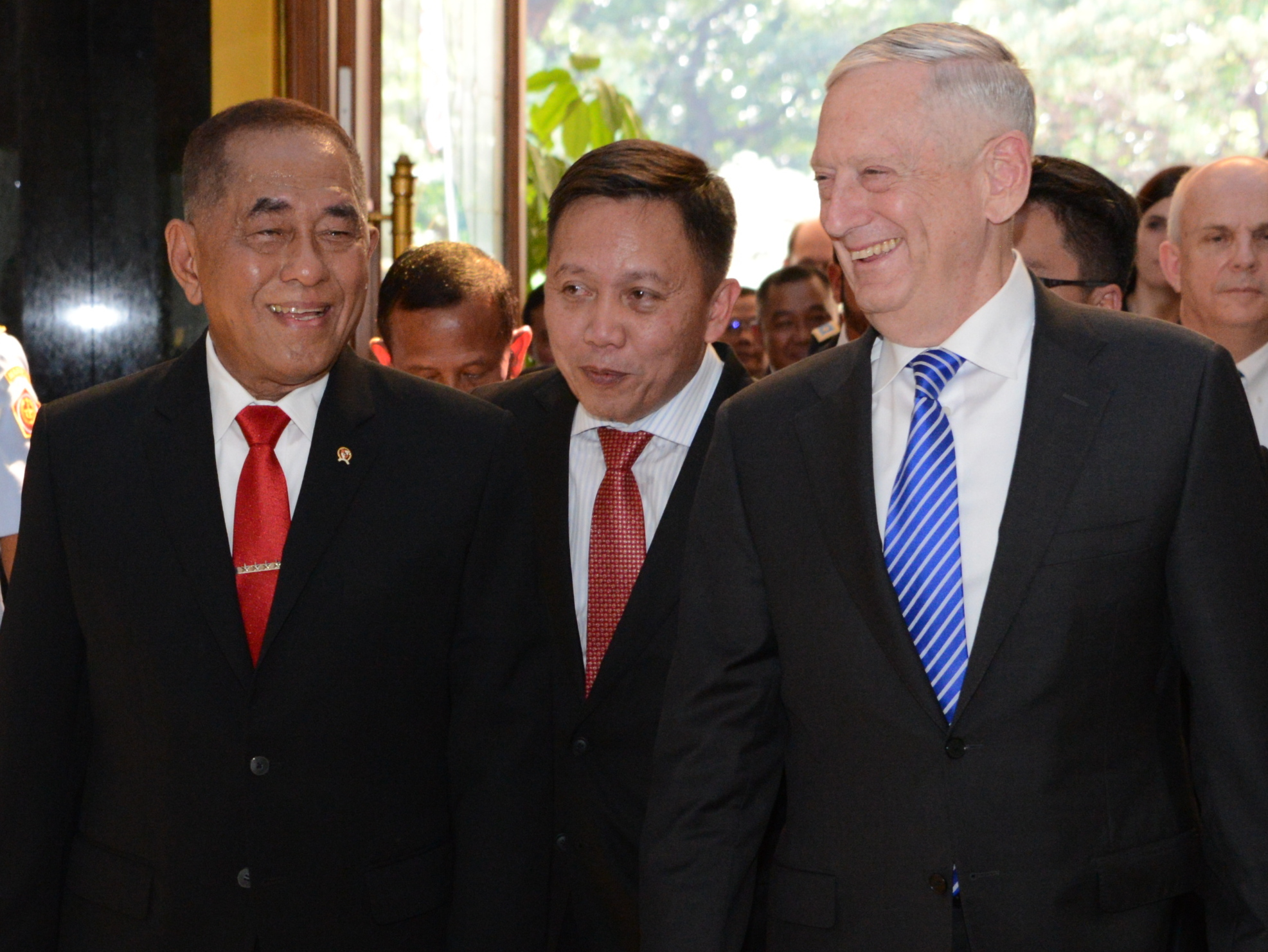
Edhie with Ryamizard Ryacudu and United States Secretary of Defense Jim Mattis in 2018.

Edhie ended his tenure in the secretariat general about a year later on 17 January 2020. He was reassigned to the Indonesian Defence University as a lecturer. Less than four months later, army chief of staff Andika Perkasa formed the Army Cyber and Crypto Center, and Edhie was appointed as its first commander.

After three years of service, Edhie ended his tenure as the commander of the Army Cyber and Crypto Center on 17 November 2023. He was installed as chief of the signal corps on the same day and was promoted to the rank of major general on 5 December.

== Personal life ==
Edhie is married to Alexandra Henny Damastuti and has two children.

Edhie has a bachelor's and master's degree in international relations from the General Achmad Yani University.
