= Elmer E. Hall =

United States Marine Corps general

Elmer Edwards Hall
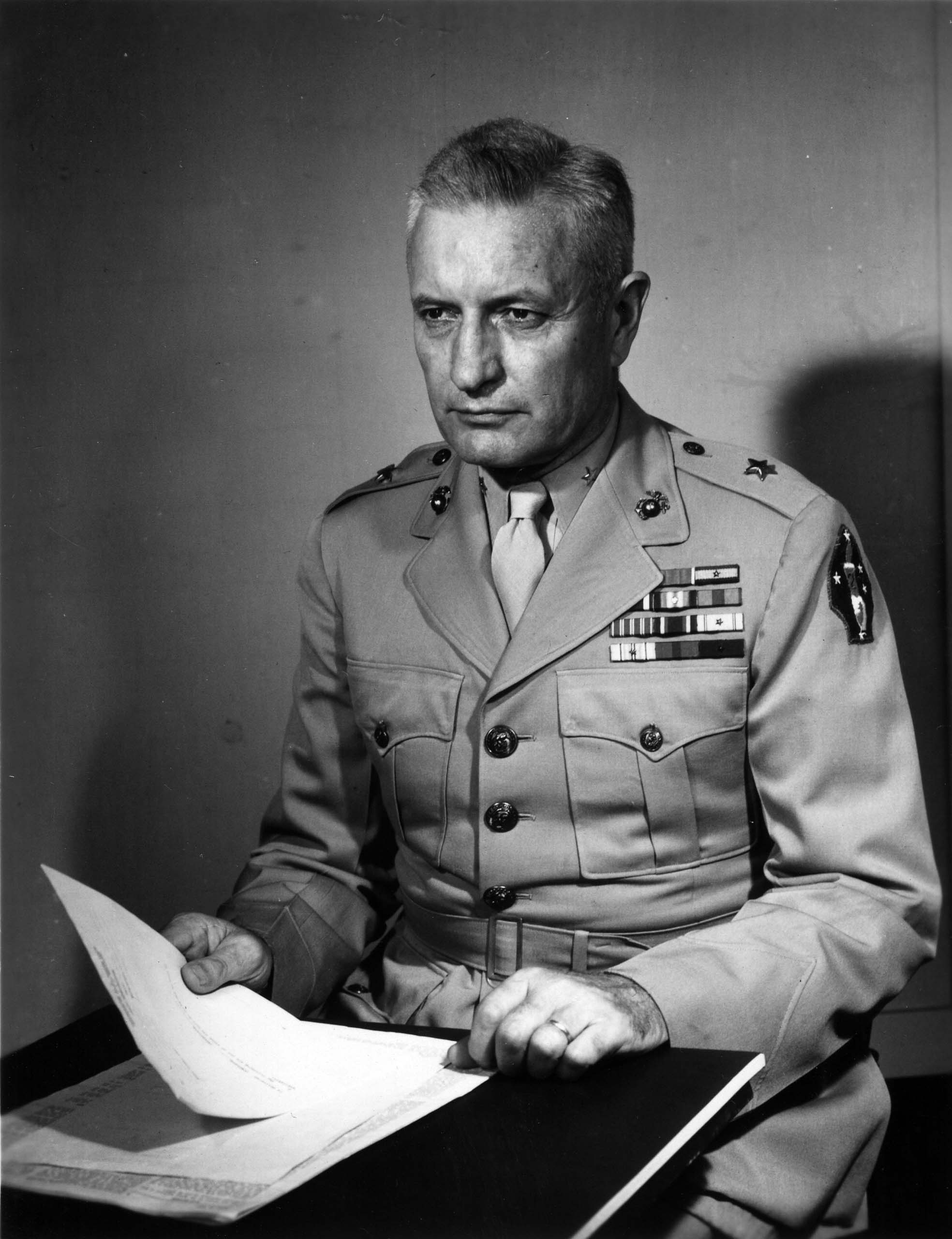
- Hall as Brigadier General, USMC
- Born: April 20, 1890; Rocky Bar, Idaho, US
- Died: September 22, 1958 (aged 68); San Diego, California, US
- Burial place: Fort Rosecrans National Cemetery
- Military career
- Allegiance: United States
- Branch: United States Marine Corps
- Service years: 1917–1946
- Rank: Brigadier general
- Service number: 0-375
- Commands: 8th Marine Regiment; 18th Marine Regiment; 2nd Engineer Battalion
- Conflicts: World War I Yangtze Patrol; Nicaraguan Campaign; World War II: Attack on Pearl Harbor; Battle of Guadalcanal; Battle of Tarawa
- Awards: Legion of Merit; Navy Commendation Medal

Elmer Edwards Hall (April 20, 1890 – September 22, 1958) was a brigadier general in the United States Marine Corps who commanded 8th Marine Regiment during the Battle of Tarawa.

== Early years ==
Elmer E. Hall was born on April 20, 1890, in Rocky Bar, Idaho, the son of Nathaniel and Louise (née Lovell) Hall. His family moved to Baker City, Oregon, when he was a child, where he attended local schools. Hall enrolled at the University of Oregon in Eugene, Oregon, and graduated in 1915 with Bachelor of Science degree. He later attended Oregon State University in Corvallis, Oregon where he received a degree in mining sciences. After graduating, Hall worked in mining for a short time before enlisting as a private in the Marine Corps on May 31, 1917, a few weeks after the American entry into World War I.

Hall trained at the Marine barracks at the Mare Island Naval Shipyard and also played guard on the unbeaten 1917 Mare Island football team, which went on to defeat the Camp Lewis Army team 19–7 in the 1918 Rose Bowl.

Hall was later promoted to the rank of sergeant and assigned to officer training at the Marine Corps Officer Candidates School. He also received the Marine Corps Good Conduct Medal for his enlisted service. Hall graduated from the officer course on August 15, 1918, and was commissioned a second lieutenant on the same date. He was subsequently assigned to 13th Marine Regiment and arrived in France by September 25, 1918. Hall did not see combat and was stationed at Brest until the end of the war.

Upon returning to the United States, Hall coached the Mare Island Marines football team, undefeated until their loss to the Great Lakes Navy Bluejackets in the 1919 Rose Bowl. The next 20 years were spent in various staff assignments, where he continued to play and coach football for the Marines.

== World War II ==
At the time of the Japanese attack on Pearl Harbor, Hall was stationed at the Marine barracks at Pearl Harbor Navy Yard, Hawaii, as commanding officer of the 2nd Engineer Battalion. He participated in the defense of the island and later in salvage operations and was decorated with the Navy Commendation Medal for his leadership during the attack. The 2nd Engineer Battalion rejoined the 2nd Marine Division and sailed for South Pacific in May 1942. He was promoted to the rank of colonel on May 21, 1942, and was the first commanding officer of the 18th Marine Regiment, 2d Marine Division, on September 8, 1942. During the Guadalcanal Campaign, Hall was stationed in New Zealand with the other rear units of the division.

Hall relieved Colonel Richard H. Jeschke as commanding officer of the 8th Marine Regiment on May 4, 1943, and supervised the refitting and further training of the regiment after heavy casualties during the Guadalcanal Campaign. He received orders for combat deployment on November 20, 1943, and sailed for Tarawa. He personally led ashore the Regimental Headquarters and 1st Battalion of his regiment, but because of bad communication with divisional headquarters, he and his men remained for over 16 hours in their landing vehicles. Hall and his regiment landed under heavy machine gun and artillery fire. The 8th Marines destroyed several enemy's positions and helped secure the island. For his leadership during the battle, Hall was decorated with the Legion of Merit with Combat "V".

Hall was relieved by Lieutenant Colonel Paul D. Sherman on December 15, 1943, and ordered back to the United States in January 1944. He was subsequently appointed liaison officer in the personnel department at Headquarters Marine Corps in Washington, D.C., and served in this capacity until the end of the war. During his time there, Hall was promoted to the rank of brigadier general on August 1, 1944 He retired from the Marine Corps in July 1946.

Hall died on September 22, 1958, in San Diego, California.

== Decorations ==
Here is the ribbon bar of Brigadier General Elmer E. Hall:

1st Row	Legion of Merit with Combat "V"			
2nd Row	Navy Commendation Medal	Navy Presidential Unit Citation with one star	Marine Corps Good Conduct Medal	World War I Victory Medal with one battle clasp
3rd Row	Marine Corps Expeditionary Medal	Second Nicaraguan Campaign Medal	Yangtze Service Medal	American Defense Service Medal with Base Clasp
4th Row	Asiatic-Pacific Campaign Medal with two service stars	American Campaign Medal	World War II Victory Medal	Nicaraguan Presidential Medal of Merit with Star and Diploma

== Honors ==
Hall Field at Marine Corps Recruit Depot San Diego was dedicated on November 17, 1956, in recognition of his contributions to Marine Corps football. Hall, as a captain, initiated the football program there in 1924.

Military offices
Preceded by Richard H. Jeschke	Commanding Officer of the 8th Marine Regiment; 4 May 1943 – 14 December 1943	Succeeded by Paul D. Sherman
