= James Blake Miller =

United States Marine

- Born: James Blake Miller; July 10, 1984 (age 42); Jonancy, Kentucky, U.S.
- Military career
- Allegiance: United States
- Branch: United States Marine Corps
- Service years: 2001–2005
- Nicknames: Marlboro Man; Marlboro Marine
- Unit: 1st Battalion, 8th Marines
- Conflicts: Iraq War: Second Battle of Fallujah

James Blake Miller (born July 10, 1984) is a United States Marine Corps veteran of the Iraq War, who fought in the Second Battle of Fallujah and was dubbed the "Marlboro Man" (and the "Marlboro Marine") after an iconic photograph of him with a cigarette was published in newspapers in the United States in 2004. Miller suffered from post-traumatic stress disorder after the war.

== Early life ==
Miller grew up in Jonancy, Kentucky. Miller's parents' inspiration of his middle name was the show Dynasty, and both grandfathers served in the military with one serving in combat during the Vietnam War. He became an ordained minister. In high school, Miller played football and was a quarterback. Not interested in working in the coal mines, Miller joined the United States Marine Corps, with the intention of eventually working in law enforcement.

== Iraq War ==
=== Second Battle of Fallujah ===
Miller was part of Charlie Company of the 1st Battalion, 8th Marine Regiment, a unit which took part in the Second Battle of Fallujah in November 2004. Los Angeles Times photographer Luis Sinco took a photo of 20-year-old Miller leaning against a wall, smoking a cigarette. In explaining the photograph, Sinco said that "His expression caught my eye. To me, it said: terrified, exhausted, and glad just to be alive. I recognized that look because that's how I felt too."

=== Marlboro Marine ===
The "Marlboro Marine" photo of Miller by Luis Sinco

Sinco's photograph of Miller was published in many newspapers. CBS Evening News anchor Dan Rather singled out the photo for its excellence, and turned the then-unidentified Marine into a celebrity. Sinco was told to find the Marine for a follow-up story and tracked down Miller four days later in an auditorium near Fallujah's civic center. Miller was embarrassed about the photo's fame, but shared information with Sinco. The two would remain friends thereafter.

After his identity was made public, people sent him care packages, including many cigarettes; President George W. Bush sent cigars, candy and memorabilia from the White House. The forward command center soon featured a large blowup of the photo. The Commanding General of the 1st Marine Division, Richard F. Natonski, made a special trip to see Miller, to Miller's surprise. The general shook Miller's hand and let him know that, because Americans had "connected" with his photo, and nobody wanted to see him wounded or dead, he was offered a trip home. Miller turned down the offer because he did not want to leave his comrades behind.

The photo was a finalist for the Pulitzer Prize for Feature Photography in 2005. The photograph was nominated by Slate in 2011 for a list of "New Classics", products of the culture since 2000 that will withstand the test of time.

== Post-war ==
After his tour, Miller returned to Marine Corps Base Camp Lejeune in North Carolina. He was married in June 2005. Divorce papers were filed a year later. He was deployed aboard USS Iwo Jima (LHD-7), to assist recovery efforts following Hurricane Katrina. During that period he blacked out during a PTSD episode. In November 2005, Miller was medically discharged from the Marine Corps.

In 2008, Miller was living in his hometown and having difficulty receiving care from the United States Department of Veterans Affairs. By 2013, he had reunited with his wife and, with the help of Sinco, sought psychological help. By 2015, Miller was receiving disability payments, and his wife had graduated from Pikeville College and is continuing to assist Miller with his PTSD, and he sees a VA psychiatrist in person and over the phone. In 2021, Miller and his wife were going through the divorce process.
