= 2nd Combat Engineer Battalion =

Battalion of the United States Marine Corps

2D Combat Engineer Battalion
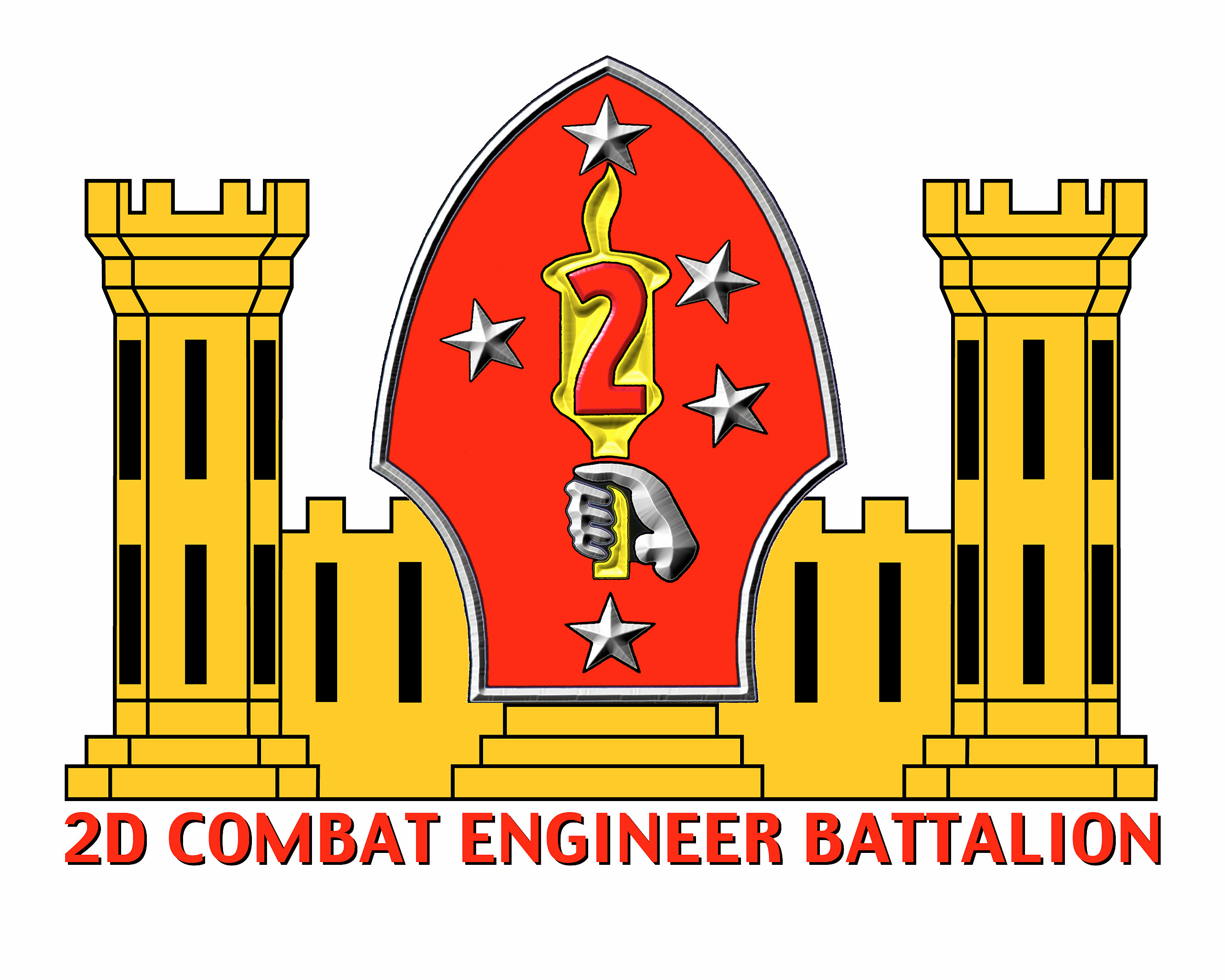
- 2nd CEB insignia
- Active: 1 November 1940 – present
- Country: United States of America
- Branch: United States Marine Corps
- Type: Combat Engineering
- Part of: 2nd Marine Division; II Marine Expeditionary Force
- Garrison/HQ: Marine Corps Base Camp Lejeune
- Nickname: 2d Combat!
- Patron: St Patrick
- Motto: Find a Way or Make One
- Engagements: World War II: Battle of Guadalcanal; Battle of Tarawa; Battle of Saipan; Battle of Tinian; Battle of Okinawa; Operation Just Cause; Operation Desert Storm; Operation Enduring Freedom; Operation Iraqi Freedom: 2003 invasion of Iraq

Commanders
- Current commander: LtCol Bryan S. Peterson
- Notable commanders: LtGen Wissler, LtGen Ottignon

2nd Combat Engineer Battalion is a combat engineer battalion of the United States Marine Corps . They are based out of Marine Corps Base Camp Lejeune, North Carolina and fall under the command of the 2nd Marine Division and the II Marine Expeditionary Force.

== Mission ==
Enhance the mobility, counter mobility, and survivability of the Marine Division through combat and limited general engineering support. The Combat Engineer Battalion performs the following tasks:

- Plan, organize and conduct mounted/dismounted deliberate breaching operations at the Company level.
- Plan, organize and conduct mounted/dismounted deliberate breaching operations at the company, battalion and regimental level.
- Plan, organize and employ expedient and deliberate demolitions.
- Plan, organize and conduct route/area sweeping operations.
- Plan, organize and construct explosive and non-explosive obstacle systems.
- Plan, organize and construct hasty and deliberate protective and tactical minefields.
- Plan, organize and construct a point minefield.
- Plan, organize and construct fighting and protective positions.
- Plan, organize and employ force protection measures.
- Plan, organize and provide missions essential water and electrical support.
- Construct and maintain limited combat roads and trails in support of Division operations.

== Organization ==
- Headquarters and Service Company
- Alpha Company
- Bravo Company
- Charlie Company
- Engineer Support Company

== History ==
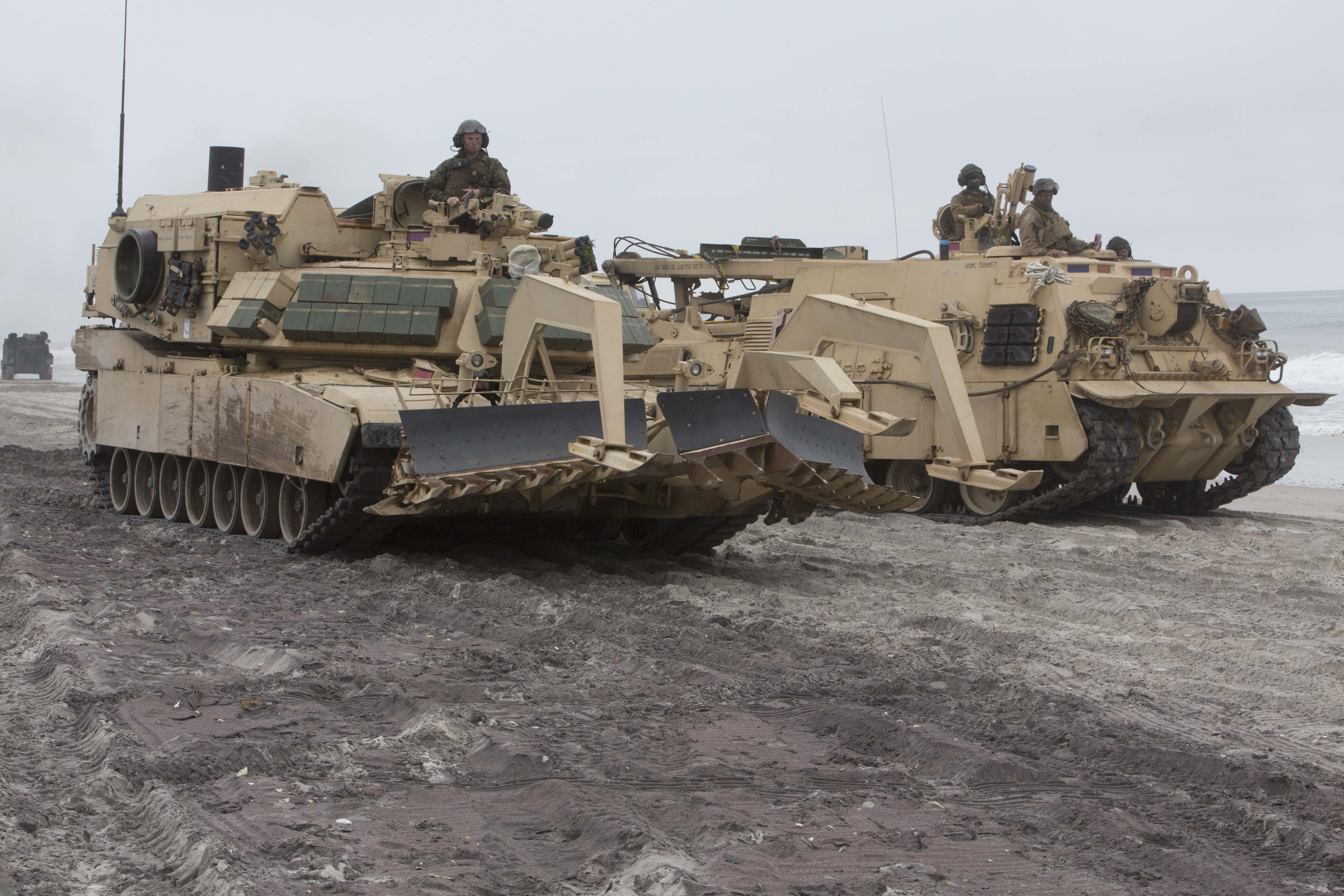
M1150 Assault Breacher Vehicle and M88A2 Hercules maneuver on Camp Lejeune, N.C., 17 Mar. 2020, during Type Commander Amphibious Training.

The 2nd Combat Engineer Battalion was activated on 1 November 1940 in order to support the 2nd Marine Brigade. With existing Company A and the activation of the Headquarters and Service Company, Companies B and C were organized 6 December 1940 in San Diego, California. On 1 April 1941, the battalion was assigned to Division Special Troops of the 2nd Marine Division. On 4 November 1941, 2nd Engineer Battalion was relocated to Marine Barracks, Navy Yard, Pearl Harbor, Hawaii. Upon Arrival, Headquarters and Service Company and Company A were assigned to Construct Camp Caitlin, Oahu.

The 2nd Engineer Battalion was relocated on 13 May 1942 to Camp Elliot, San Diego. From here, engineers from Company A embarked for Guadalcanal, and participated in the landing on that island. On 8 September 1942 2nd Engineer Battalion was redesignated as "1st Battalion, 18th Marines". During World War II, the engineers of 18th Marines participated in Campaigns on Guadalcanal, Tarawa, Saipan, Tinian, and Okinawa. 18th Marines was redesignated 16 August 1944 as the 2nd Engineer Battalion. On 23 September 1945, 2nd Engineer Battalion was redeployed to Nagasaki, Japan to begin its duty with the Occupational Force.

The 2d Engineer Battalion relocated to Marine Corps Base Camp Lejeune, during July 1946. A major redesignation took place on 17 May 1958 with 2nd Engineer Battalion becoming the 2nd Pioneer Battalion, 2nd Marine Division. Engineers with Battalion Landing Team's 1/8, 3/6, and 2/2 landed in Lebanon during the summer of 1958. The 2nd Pioneer Battalion maintained a combat-ready posture during the October/November Cuban Missile Crisis while on maneuvers in the Caribbean. Another change of designation took place on 1 April 1976 when the 2nd Pioneer Battalion returned to its former designation as the 2nd Engineer Battalion. During the spring of 1965, Marines from 2nd Engineer Battalion landed in the Dominican Republic on a peace keeping mission. Also, training exercises in numerous European and South American countries were supported by Marines from 2nd Engineer Battalion, who participated in civic action projects. On 15 April 1976 the 2nd Engineer Battalion was designated as 2nd Combat Engineer Battalion.

In the 1970s and early 1980s the battalion furnished Combat Engineer Support to the Battalion Landing Teams (BLT) in the Mediterranean, the Caribbean, 29 Palms, Norway, and Guantanamo Bay, Cuba. From August 1982 to February 1984 Marines from 2nd Combat Engineer Battalion were part of the multinational peacekeeping force in Beirut, Lebanon. Late in October 1983, Combat Engineers landed and occupied the island of Grenada with the 22nd Marine Amphibious Unit. The battalion continued to provide Combat Engineer Platoons to the BLT's of the 22nd and 26th Marine Expeditionary Units and support elements of the division throughout the world. During April 1990, elements of the battalion supported division units attached to Marine Forces Panama and participated in Operation Just Cause. In August 1990, Company D, while deployed aboard the USS Barnstable County (LST-1197) off the coast of West Africa participated in Operation Sharp Edge assisting in the evacuation of civilians from Liberia. During Operation Desert Storm the battalion deployed in support of the 4th MEB and the 2nd Marine Division leading the division through the myriad of obstacle belts into Kuwait. Recently engineers have participated in military operations in Bosnia, Haiti, and Cuba, and most recently, participating in Operation Enduring Freedom and Operation Iraqi Freedom.

== See also ==
- List of United States Marine Corps battalions
- Organization of the United States Marine Corps
