= Jonancy, Kentucky =

Unincorporated community in Kentucky, United States

Jonancy
- Unincorporated community
- Location within the state of Kentucky Jonancy (the United States)
- Coordinates: 37°18′59″N 82°34′59″W
- Country: United States
- State: Kentucky
- County: Pike
- Elevation: 945 ft (288 m)
- Time zone: UTC-6 (Eastern (EST))
  - Summer (DST): UTC-5 (EST)
- ZIP codes: 41538
- GNIS feature ID: 508353

Jonancy is a small unincorporated community and coal town in Pike County, Kentucky, United States, in the far eastern part of the state. The latitude and longitude are 37.316N and -82.583W. Jonancy is in the Eastern Coal Field region. The community is in the Eastern time zone.

According to James Blake Miller, the hamlet's best-known resident, Jonancy was "named after my great-great-great grandparents: Joe and Nancy Miller ... [t]hey were the first people in those parts."

== History ==
In 1911, the Sandy Valley and Elkhorn Railroad was built through Jonancy along Shelby Creek. Today, Kentucky State Highway 3527 runs through Jonancy adjacent to the old railroad, while the highway becomes KY 610 before reaching Jonancy.

By 1920, Jonancy residents formed the town's only place of worship, Union Church, a Baptist congregation.

Jonancy has a post office.
