= USS McCawley =

USS McCawley may refer to the following ships of the United States Navy:

- USS McCawley (DD-276), a Clemson-class destroyer, commissioned in 1919 and decommissioned in 1930.
- USS McCawley (APA-4), a transport commissioned in 1940 and later recommissioned as APA-4. She was sunk by a combination of enemy and friendly fire in 1943.
