= Richard H. Jeschke =

American military personnel

Richard Hall Jeschke
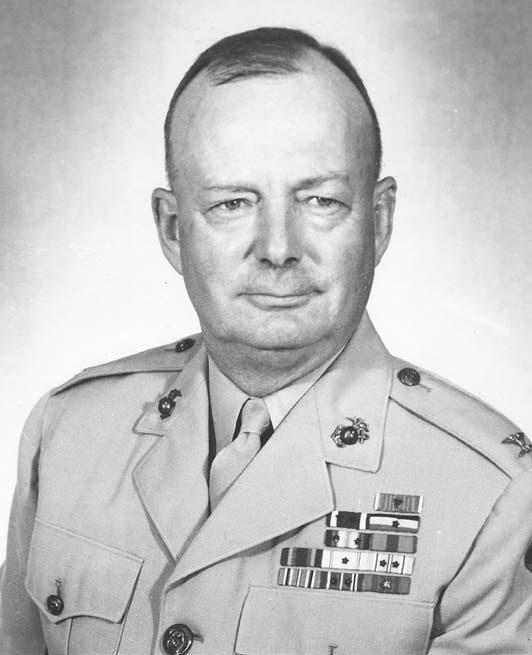
- Jeschke as colonel, USMC
- Born: December 22, 1894; La Grange, Illinois, US
- Died: December 15, 1957 (aged 62); Markham, Virginia, US
- Burial place: Arlington National Cemetery
- Relatives: BG James Devereux, USMC (brother-in-law)
- Military career
- Allegiance: United States
- Branch: United States Marine Corps
- Service years: 1917–1949
- Rank: Brigadier general
- Service number: 0-476
- Commands: 8th Marine Regiment; 1st Battalion, 8th Marines; Marine Barracks, NB Pearl Harbor
- Conflicts: World War I Yangtze Patrol; World War II: Battle of Guadalcanal; Solomon Islands campaign; Invasion of Sicily; Invasion of Normandy
- Awards: Legion of Merit; Navy Commendation Medal (2)

Richard Hall Jeschke (December 22, 1894 – December 15, 1957) was a decorated officer of the United States Marine Corps with the rank of brigadier general, who commanded 8th Marine Regiment during the Battle of Guadalcanal. He later served in the European Theater and participated in the planning of the Invasion of Normandy and the Invasion of Sicily.

== Early life ==
Richard H. Jeschke was born on 22 December 1894 in La Grange, Illinois. He attended the University of Chicago and graduated in 1917 with Bachelor of Science degree. While a student, Jeschke served with the Michigan Naval Militia, but following his graduation from the university, he resigned his commission in order to accept an appointment in the Marine Corps Reserve. He was commissioned second lieutenant in the Marine Corps Reserve on 21 May 1917 and immediately recalled to active duty. Jeschke was assigned first to the Marine Corps Rifle Range in Winthrop, Maryland and after two months of training there, he was assigned to the Marine Barracks Quantico, Virginia.

In October 1917, Jeschke was promoted to the rank of first lieutenant and assigned to the Marine detachment aboard the battleship USS New York. He sailed to the Atlantic Ocean with that ship as a part of the United States Grand Fleet and participated in blockade and convoy duties. Jeschke returned to the Marine Barracks Quantico in 1918 and following his promotion to the rank of captain, he was assigned for duty with Overseas Depot.

After the end of World War I, he was assigned to the Norfolk Navy Yard in March 1919 for duty with Transport service. From 1919 to 1926, Jeschke served in various posts within the United States, before he was assigned to the Company Officers Course at Marine Corps School, Quantico. He finished the course in April 1927 and was subsequently assigned to the 6th Marine Regiment at Philadelphia Navy Yard and sailed to China to protect the American Legation at Peking. While in China, he was transferred to the staff of the 3rd Marine Brigade and appointed commander of the 15th Machine Gun Company.

The situation in China had quieted at the beginning of 1929 and Jeschke returned to the United States. He served for a brief period at Marine Corps Base San Diego, before he was appointed commanding officer of the school detachment within Marine Corps Schools at Quantico, Virginia. Jeschke took a course at Command and General Staff College at Fort Leavenworth, Kansas, and was promoted to the rank of major in October 1934. After graduating, he served at Marine Corps Base San Diego until August 1936, when he was transferred to Washington, D.C., and appointed to the Adjutant and Inspector's Department at Headquarters Marine Corps under Brigadier-General Edward A. Ostermann.

When World War II in Europe broke out, Jeschke was promoted to the rank of lieutenant colonel and was transferred to the Marine Barracks Parris Island to be appointed chief of staff to Major General James C. Breckinridge.

== World War II ==
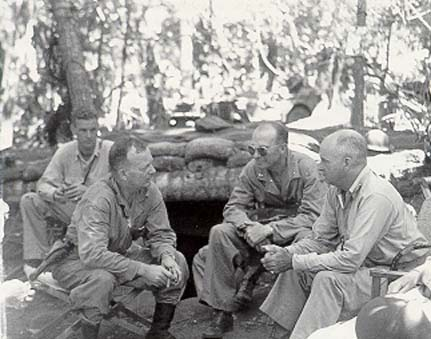
Change of command on Guadalcanal, December 1942. Maj. Gen. Alexander M. Patch, center, succeeds Maj. Gen. Alexander A. Vandegrift (USMC), right. Col. Richard H. Jeschke (USMC) briefs them.

Upon the Japanese attack on Pearl Harbor on 7 December 1941, Jeschke was appointed commanding officer of the 8th Marine Regiment on 23 December. The 8th Marines were attached to the 2nd Marine Brigade and sailed for defensive duty to American Samoa. His task was to prevent the enemy from cutting the vital lines of communication between the United States and Australia and New Zealand. Jeschke commanded the 8th Marines during the subsequent expansion and improvement of the beach defenses and fortifications. He later supervised the regiment's intensive jungle training in order to prepare for upcoming offensive operations. During his training on Samoa, he was promoted to the rank of colonel.

Jeschke arrived at Lunga Point on Guadalcanal at the beginning of November 1942 and almost immediately took part in heavy combat with the Japanese, which lasted for the next two months. Although 8th Marines had no previous combat experience, eight months of intensive training at Samoa under Jeschke's command helped them to become an outstanding unit. Jeschke commanded the 8th Marines during the final drive toward the west and the island was declared secured at the beginning of February 1943. For his leadership during combat, Jeschke was decorated with the Navy Commendation Medal with Combat "V". He also received his first Navy Presidential Unit Citation.

Colonel Jeschke remained with 8th Marines until the beginning of May 1943, when he was relieved by Colonel Elmer E. Hall. He was subsequently transferred to the United States and assigned for a brief period to the Headquarters Marine Corps. Jeschke was subsequently appointed Force Marine operations and training officer on the staff of the Western Naval Task Force located in the Mediterranean under the command of Rear Admiral Henry Kent Hewitt. In this capacity, he participated in the planning of the Invasion of Sicily in July 1943 and received his second Navy Commendation Medal for his efforts.

Following the Sicily campaign, Jeschke was transferred to England and assigned as observer to the First Army under Lieutenant-General Omar Bradley and later returned to the staff of the Western Naval Task Force now under Admiral Alan Goodrich Kirk as Assistant Planning Officer and Joint Operations Officer. He participated in the planning of the Invasion of Normandy and went ashore with General Bradley. During D-Day, Jeschke kept Admiral Kirk informed and made frequent liaison visits to front-line Army combat units ashore. For his work on D-Day, he was decorated with the Legion of Merit with Combat "V" and also received the French Croix de Guerre 1939–1945 with Gilt Star from the Government of France.

His tour of duty in Europe ended in September 1944, when he was transferred back to the United States and assigned to the Headquarters Marine Corps in Washington, D.C., as officer in charge of the Enlisted Performance Division and Decorations and Medals Division. Jeschke was later appointed Chief of the Performance Branch.

== Later career ==
Colonel Jeschke served at Headquarters Marine Corps until October 1945, when he was transferred to Hawaii and assumed command of the Marine Barracks, Naval Base Pearl Harbor. He returned to the United States in December 1947 and was appointed director of the 1st Marine Corps Reserve District in Boston, Massachusetts. His last assignment came in June 1948, when he was appointed Division Inspector of 2nd Marine Division at Camp Lejeune under Major General Franklin A. Hart.

Jeschke retired from the Marine Corps on 1 May 1949 and was advanced to the rank of brigadier general on the retired list for having been specially commended in combat. Jeschke died on December 15, 1957, and is buried at Arlington National Cemetery together with his wife Margaret Mary Devereux Jeschke. They had one son, Richard Hall Jeschke Jr. (1921–2000), who also became a Marine officer and retired as colonel. His brother-in-law was James Devereux, brigadier general, USMC.

== Decorations ==
Here is the ribbon bar of Brigadier General Richard H. Jeschke:

1st Row	Legion of Merit with Combat "V"	Navy Commendation Medal with Combat "V" and one star	Navy Presidential Unit Citation with one star	World War I Victory Medal with two battle clasps
2nd Row	Marine Corps Expeditionary Medal	Yangtze Service Medal	American Defense Service Medal with Base Clasp	Asiatic-Pacific Campaign Medal with two service stars
3rd Row	American Campaign Medal	European–African–Middle Eastern Campaign Medal with two service stars	World War II Victory Medal	French Croix de Guerre 1939-1945 with Gilt Star

Military offices
Preceded by Henry L. Larsen	Commanding Officer of the 8th Marine Regiment; 23 December 1941 – 3 May 1943	Succeeded by Elmer E. Hall
