= 1st Battalion, 8th Marines =

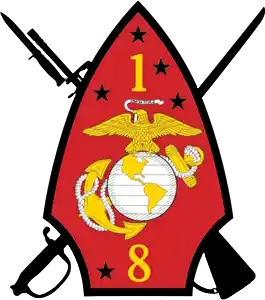
- Active: April 1, 1940 – November 18, 1947; November 1, 1950 – present
- Country: United States
- Branch: United States Marine Corps
- Type: Marines
- Size: Battalion
- Part of: 8th Marine Regiment; 2nd Marine Division
- Garrison/HQ: Marine Corps Base Camp Lejeune
- Nicknames: The Beirut Battalion; Foul Weather Warriors; More Than Duty
- Motto: "Never Quit"
- Engagements: World War II; Battle of Guadalcanal; Battle of Tarawa; Battle of Saipan; Battle of Tinian; Battle of Okinawa; Occupation of Japan; Operation Blue Bat; Cuban Missile Crisis; Operation Power Pack; Multinational Force in Lebanon; Beirut barracks bombing; Persian Gulf War; Operation Restore Hope; Global war on terrorism; Iraq War; War in Afghanistan; Operation Allies Refuge

Commanders
- Current commander: LtCol Matthew D. Tweedy, USMC
- Notable commanders: John H. Miller, Jan C. Huly, Michael W. Hagee

1st Battalion, 8th Marines (1/8) is an infantry marines battalion in the United States Marine Corps (USMC) based out of Marine Corps Base Camp Lejeune, North Carolina. The battalion consists of approximately 1000 Marines and Sailors and is nicknamed "The Beirut Battalion." The battalion falls under the command of the 6th Marine Regiment and the 2nd Marine Division.

The unit's history dates back to World War II where it fought in numerous campaigns in the Pacific War including Guadalcanal, Tarawa, Saipan, Tinian and Okinawa. During the Cold War, it was part of Operation Blue Bat in Lebanon in 1958, the Cuban Missile Crisis in 1962, the intervention in the Dominican Republic in 1965, and the 1983 Beirut barracks bombing in Lebanon where 241 Marines, sailors and soldiers lost their lives. In 1991, it took part in operations during the Gulf War. Since 2001, 1/8 has fought the Global War on Terrorism by serving numerous tours in Iraq and Afghanistan as part of Operation Iraqi Freedom and Operation Enduring Freedom - Afghanistan.

== Subordinate units ==
- Headquarters and Service Company
- Alpha Company
- Bravo Company
- Charlie Company
- Weapons Company

== History ==
=== Activation ===
1st Battalion, 8th Marines was commissioned on April 1, 1940, in San Diego, California and was assigned to the 2nd Marine Brigade. The 2nd Marine Brigade was re-designated February 1, 1941, as 2nd Marine Division. After the outbreak of war, the 8th Marine Regiment with an assortment of other division assets formed the 2nd Marine Brigade and was dispatched to garrison American Samoa.

=== World War II ===
Deployed during January 1942 to American Samoa and detached from the 2nd Marine Division, they participated in the following World War II campaigns:

==== Guadalcanal campaign ====
On 4 and 5 November 1942 (D+90) the 8th Marines (1st, 2nd, 3rd BN's) led by Colonel Richard H. Jeschke arrived from American Samoa, landing as reinforcements on Guadalcanal.

On 12 January, the Marines began their advance with the 8th Marines along the shore and 2d Marines inland. All along the front of the advancing assault companies the going was rough. The Japanese, remnants of the Sendai Division, were dug into the sides of a series of cross compartments and their fire took the Marines in the flank as they advanced. Progress was slow despite massive artillery support and naval gunfire from four destroyers offshore. In two days of heavy fighting, flamethrowers were employed for the first time and tanks were brought into play.

The 2d Marines was now relieved and the 6th Marines moved into the attack along the coast while the 8th Marines took up the advance inland. Naval gunfire support, spotted by naval officers ashore, improved measurably. On the 15th, the Americans, both Army and Marine, reached the initial corps objective. In the Marine attack zone, 600 Japanese were dead. The 8th Marines was essentially pinched out of the front lines by a narrowing attack corridor as the inland mountains and hills pressed closer to the coastal trail.

On 31 January, the 2d Marines and the 1st Battalion, 8th Marines, boarded ship to leave Guadalcanal. 1st Battalion 8th Marines headed for Wellington, New Zealand. The 8th Marine Regiment losses on Guadalcanal were 115 killed, 451 wounded, and 9 missing.

==== Battle of Tarawa ====
1st Battalion 8th Marines departed the USS Sheridan (APA-51) via LVT's, and waited at the line of departure. Watching the battle unfold from sea as the division reserve, the battalion was ordered ashore after several hours. Unfortunately, there was quite a bit of confusion and the word didn't reach the commander for some time. After 18 hours out at sea, 1/8 landed on Red Beach 2 at 06:15 on November 21, 1943 (D+1).

As soon as 1/8 began coming ashore, the murderous onslaught started. The LVTs didn't fare any better than the D-Day landings and were quickly bogged down by the reef. The men of 1/8 landed on the far right of Red 2 after wading over 500 yards ashore. The battalion commanding officer, Major Lawrence C. Hays reported to Colonel David M. Shoup, the newly promoted commander of the 2nd Marine Regiment, at 08:00 with about half his landing team. 1/8 had suffered more than 300 casualties just getting ashore; others were scattered all along the beach and the pier. Worse, the unit had lost all its flamethrowers, demolitions, and heavy weapons.

Col. Shoup directed Major Hays to attack westward, but both men knew that small arms and courage alone would not prevail against fortified positions. The Marines of 1/8 fought hard all day. Despite the slow progress, Col. Shoup ended his 16:00 hours message to General Smith with the line, "Casualties: many. Percentage dead: unknown. Combat efficiency: We are winning."

Col. Edson issued his attack orders for D+1 at 04:00 hours. 1/8, attached to 2nd Marines was to attack at daylight to the west along north beach to eliminate Japanese pockets of resistance between Beaches Red 1 and 2. On Red Beach Two, Major Hays launched his attack promptly at 07:00, attacking westward on a three-company front. Engineers with satchel charges and bangalore torpedoes helped neutralize several inland Japanese positions, but the strongpoints along the re-entrant were still dangerous. Marine light tanks made frontal attacks against the fortifications, even firing their 37mm guns point blank into the embrasures, but they were inadequate for the task. One was lost to enemy fire, and the other two were withdrawn.

Hays called for a section of 75mm halftracks. One was lost almost immediately, but the other used its heavier gun to considerable advantage. The center and left flank companies managed to curve around behind the main complexes, effectively cutting the Japanese off from the rest of the island. Along the beach, however, progress was measured in yards. The bright spot of the day for 1/8 came late in the afternoon when a small party of Japanese tried a sortie from the strongpoints against the Marine lines. Hays' men, finally given real targets in the open, cut down the attackers in short order.

The toughest fight of the fourth day (D+3) occurred on the Red Beach One/Two border where Colonel Shoup directed the combined forces of Hays' 1/8 and Schoettel's 3/2 against the "re-entrant strongpoints. The Japanese defenders in these positions were clearly the most disciplined—and the deadliest—on the island. From these bunkers, Japanese antiboat gunners had thoroughly disrupted the landings of four different battalions, and they had very nearly killed General Smith the day before. The seaward approaches to these strongpoints were littered with wrecked LVTs and bloated bodies.

Major Hays finally got some flamethrowers (from Crowe's engineers when LT 2/8 was ordered to stand down), and the attack of 1/8 from the east made steady, if painstaking, progress. Major Schoettel, anxious to atone for what some perceived to be a lackluster effort on D-Day, pressed the assault of 3/2 from the west and south. To complete the circle, Shoup ordered a platoon of infantry and a pair of 75mm halftracks out to the reef to keep the defenders pinned down from the lagoon. Some of the Japanese committed hara-kiri; the remainder, exhausted, fought to the end.

Hays' Marines had been attacking this complex ever since their landing on the morning of D+1. In those 48 hours, 1/8 fired 54,450 rounds of .30-caliber rifle ammunition. But the real damage was done by the special weapons of the engineers and the direct fire of the halftracks. Capture of the largest position, a concrete pillbox near the beach, enabled easier approaches to the remaining bunkers. By 13:00, it was all over. At the Red 1/Red 2 pocket there was no accurate count of Japanese dead.

There were an estimated 1,000 Japanese alive and fighting on the night of D+2, 500 on the morning of D+3 and only 50-100 left when the island was declared secure at 13:30 D+3. 2nd Marine Division suffered 894 killed in action, 48 officers and 846 enlisted men, with another 84 of the survivors later succumbing to their wounds.

Following the battle 1/8 along with the 2nd Marine Division was shipped to the big island of Hawaii. 1/8 remained in Hawaii for six months, refitting and training, until called upon for its next major amphibious landing, the Battle of Saipan in the Marianas in June 1944.

==== Battle of Saipan ====
1st Battalion 8th Marines landed on Green Beach on 15 June 1944. Confusion on the beaches, particularly in the 2d Marine Division area, was compounded by the strength of a northerly current flow which caused the assault battalions of the 6th and 8th Marines to land about 400 yards too far north. This caused a gap to widen between the 2d and 4th Marine Divisions.

On D+1 8th Marines moved east into the swamps around Lake Susupe. On 20 June the 8th Marines wheeled from facing east to attack northward into the foothills leading to Mount Tapotchau. The following day saw the Marines attack all along the line. The 8th Marines worked its painful way into the maze of ridges and gullies that formed the foothills of Mount Tapotchau.

On the west side of Saipan, on 25 June, the 8th marines ascended the eastern slope, and a battalion of the 29th Marines (then attached to the 8th Marines) was able to infiltrate around the right flank in single file behind a screen of smoke and gain the peak without the loss of a single man. Over the next several days the 8th Marines encountered four small hills defended by the enemy. Because of their size in comparison with Mount Tapotchau, they were called "pimples." Each was named after a battalion commander. One by one, they were assaulted and taken over the next few days.

Bypassing the town, the 2d Marine Division drove towards Flores Point, halfway to Tanapag. Along the way, with filthy uniforms, stiff with sweat and dirt after over two weeks of fierce fighting, the Marines joyfully dipped their heads and hands into the cool ocean waters. By 4 July 1/8 and the 2nd Division were moved into the reserve force in order to prepare for the attack on Tinian.

==== Battle of Tinian ====
At 17:05 on July 24, (Jig Day), 1/8 disembarked from the USS Calvert (APA-32) coming ashore at White Beach 1 at the request of the 4th Marine Division commander. The battalion was requested at 15:15 hours, however due to communication delays it didn't arrive until that evening. 1/8 was assigned as the 4th Marine Division reserve and was ordered to support the 24th Marine Regiment. Once ashore the battalion dug in at a place on the line near 2nd Battalion, 24th Marines.

On July 25 (Jig+1), Lieutenant Colonel Hays' 1st Battalion, 8th Marines began the day under the tactical control of the 24th Regiment. The battalion received orders to relieve the 1st Battalion, 24th Marines, along the coast on the extreme left flank of the beachhead. This shift was accomplished at 09:20, almost the same moment that Hays' unit reverted to its parent regiment, the newly landed 8th Marines. The latter, now attached to the 4th Division, assumed the northernmost sector of the front with 2 medium and 2 light (flamethrower) tanks from the 2nd Tank Battalion attached. 8th Regiment then began to struggle northward toward Ushi Point.

Using the same tactics employed along the beach by the 24th Marines on Jig-Day, 1/8 supported by armored amphibians afloat and tanks ashore, inched slowly through the gnarled coastal terrain and snare-like undergrowth. Marines found the zone littered with bodies—Japanese counterattackers of the night before that required careful examination for suicidal survivors. At first there was no opposition, but as the unit pressed farther to the north resistance began to develop along the coast. There, survivors of the counterattack, holed up in the craggy coral, fired occasional challenging bursts at the Marines.

By 11:15 the advance had bogged to a virtual standstill in the face of an especially knotty core of opposition near the water's edge. The rugged terrain around the strong-point forbade effective use of supporting tanks, and the armored amphibians, because of the shore's configuration, could not hit the area. To relieve the deadlock, Lieutenant Colonel Hays ordered his battalion to pivot on the left and wheel in an arc to the beach. This maneuver, striking the enemy at right angles to the original direction of advance, was successful. Within 15 minutes a pocket of 20 to 25 well-concealed riflemen had been reduced.

As the 8th Marines advanced, their front expanded, and at 11:30 the commander, Colonel Wallace, ordered his 2d Battalion up on the 1st Battalion's right to attack eastward. This zone included the built-up area around Ushi Point Airfield as well as the strip itself. Since most of the Japanese troops originally assigned to this area had expended themselves against the 1st Battalion, 24th Marines, on the night of Jig-Day, they could oppose this attack only with occasional, ineffective small-arms fire. The advance swept rapidly through the area. The 1st Battalion, too, gained momentum after destroying the beach strong-point and pushed northeastward along the coast. By dark the 8th Marines, having pushed about 200 yards past Objective O-2, stopped and carefully tied in lines for the night.

At 06:30 on 26 July (Jig+2), 1/8 along with the 8th Regiment were ordered back to 2nd Marine Division Control in order to facilitate the day's attack. With the 8th Marines on the left, the 2nd Marine Division began pushing eastward. 8th Marines swept rapidly across the Ushi Point flats. The airfield had been abandoned, but the Marines carefully searched each position to make certain that none of the enemy were lying in wait. By noon Colonel Wallace, the 8th Marines' commander, reported his assault battalions (1st and 2nd BN) on the east coast. 8th Regiment, now designated division reserve, began searching for enemy stragglers west of Objective O-3. 2nd Division's successful 2,500-yard push to the east coast now made it possible for the landing force to attack in a single direction, south. 1/8 and the 8th Regiment remained the division reserve until 31 July.

The night of 31 July - 1 August turned out to be the busiest of 1/8 and the 8th Regiment. The entire division's success depended on the 8th Marines success of reaching the heights of Objective O-8A. The going was tough due to the steep climb, but by the afternoon a platoon from A Company followed by a platoon from C Company 1/8 made a breakthrough and reached the summit. That night the Japanese launched a vicious local counterattack against 1/8's left. The situation was touch and go for a short time, one section of the Marines' front was even forced back a few yards, but the attackers were too few for the task they had assumed, and the Marines overcame the assault. Japanese counterattacks continued throughout the night, probing at 1/8's gaps in the line. They solved the issue by stringing concertina wire between foxholes.

At 14:55 on 1 August, 8th Marines reached their final objective with only sporadic resistance. 1/8 was then assigned the lion's share of mop up operations. On 6 August the 8th Marines assumed responsibility for the entire 2d Division sector and continued mopping-up activities. The next day the regiment also took over the 4th Division area, relieving the 23d Marines, which had patrolled that sector since 4 August.

At noon, 10 August, the 8th Marines became part of the Tinian Island Command, but the mop-up operations continued. On 25 October 8th Marines left 1st Battalion 8th Marines on Tinian and moved back to Saipan. After five months' garrison duty, 1/8 left Tinian and moved back to Saipan on 1 January 1945. For the 8th Marine Regiment securing Tinian came at a cost of 36 KIA and 294 WIA, the highest casualties of the five regiments assigned to the 2nd Marine Division.

Tinian had a strategic significance not fully apparent to the Marines who captured it in July 1944: slightly over a year later, 6 August 1945, the island provided the Army Air Forces a site from which the B-29 Enola Gay carried out the atomic bombing of Hiroshima. From the same field three days later another B-29 carried a second bomb, which was dropped on Nagasaki.

==== Battle of Okinawa ====
The 2nd Marine Division (including 1/8) remained as an amphibious reserve from 1–10 April 1945, when it was sent back to Saipan to minimize casualties from Kamikaze attacks off the coast of Okinawa.

In late May, the 8th Marines of the 2nd Marine Division finally got a meaningful role in the closing weeks of the Okinawa campaign. Colonel Clarence R. Wallace and his 8th Marines, with Lt. Col Richard W. Hayward leading 1/8, arrived from Saipan, and were committed to the campaign.

Between 3–9 June, 1/8 and the 8th Marines conducted amphibious landings to capture two outlying islands, Iheya Shima and Aguni Shima. The purpose of the mission was to provide more early warning radar sites against the kamikazes devastating the naval fleet offshore. No enemy contact was made on the operation.

Following the missions at Iheya Shima and Aguni Shima, General Roy Geiger assigned the 8th Marines, 1/8 included, to the 1st Marine Division, and by 18 June they had relieved the 7th Marines and were sweeping southeastward for the final overland assaults in the south.

Army Lt. General Simon Buckner, commander of the Okinawa operation, took an interest in observing the 8th Marines as this was their first time in action on Okinawa since the regiment entered the lines in the drive to the south. Buckner went to a forward observation post on 18 June, watching the 8th Marines advance along the valley floor. Japanese gunners on the opposite ridge saw the official party and opened up. Shells struck the nearby coral outcrop, driving a lethal splinter into the general's chest. He died in 10 minutes, one of the few senior U.S. officers to be killed in action throughout World War II. Marine General Geiger took over, declaring organized resistance on the island over on 21 June. The first battalion 8th Marine regiment suffered its last combat death of World War II the next day on 22 June 1945.

1/8 and the 8th Marines, attached to the 1st Marine Division, received the Presidential Unit Citation for their part in the Okinawa campaign. They would return to Saipan, until called upon for occupation duty in Japan

==== Occupation of Japan ====
1/8 deployed during September 1945 to Nagasaki, Japan, and participated in the occupation of Japan from September 1945 – June 1946. By 18 October, all units of the 8th Marines had established themselves in and around Kumamoto and begun the by-now familiar process of inventory and disposition.

On 29 October, a motor convoy carrying the major part of 1/8 moved from Kumamoto to Kagoshima city to assume control of western Kagoshima. The battalion had to start anew the routine of reconnaissance, inspection, inventory, and disposition that had occupied it twice before.

By early 1946, 2nd Marine Division began taking over areas once occupied by soon to be deactivated Army units; 8th Marines were moved to Kumamoto and Kagoshima. They relocated during June–July 1946 to Camp Lejeune, North Carolina, and were deactivated November 18, 1947.

=== Reactivation ===
The battalion was reactivated November 1, 1950, at Camp Lejeune, North Carolina, as the 1st Battalion, 8th Marines and assigned to the 2nd Marine Division. It deployed to the Mediterranean and the Caribbean at various times from the 1950s through the 1990s.

=== 1958 Lebanon crisis ===
BLT 1/8 had already been deployed to the Mediterranean since 9 January and was due to rotate back to the U.S., but due to the unrest in Lebanon their deployment was extended. At 09:00, 18 July, the third battalion (2/2 and 3/6 being the first two) of the 2d Provisional Marine Force, BLT 1/8 under Lieutenant Colonel John H. Brickley, landed at Yellow Beach, four miles north of Beirut, where they remained and reinforced their positions.

On 21 July 1958, BLT 1/8 received permission to begin motorized patrols. The patrols reconnoitered up to 20 miles east of the position of 1/8 north of the city. The biggest medical problem confronting the Marines in Lebanon was the outbreak of dysentery. During the period 18–31 July, BLT 1/8 alone suffered 48 cases. On 14 August 1/8 took over 2/2's former position where is remained until leaving in September.

=== Cuban Missile Crisis ===
On 20 October 1962, 1/8 received orders to Guantanamo Bay Naval Base, Cuba. On 22 October 1962, 1st Battalion 8th Marines arrived in echelon at Naval Air Station, Guantanamo Bay. The line companies went into defensive positions at Leeward Point, except Company B, which took up a position on the Windward Side. 1/8's mission was the defense of the airfield until relieved. On 18 November 1962, President Kennedy lifted the naval blockade of Cuba.

By 6 December 1962 it was announced that 1/8 would be airlifted to Cherry Point, NC by 12 December 1962. Company A (Rein) remained at Leeward Point until about 7 January 1963. 1/8 suffered two casualties (WIA) due to a friendly fire incident on 7 November while a sentry was investigating a telephone silence at Outpost Sneezy.

=== Dominican Republic ===
By May 2, 1965, 1/8 had been designated as the airlift alert battalion under the command of Lieutenant Colonel Edward F Danowitz. The first increment departed shortly after midnight onboard C-130s for San Isidro Air Base. The leading elements of the battalion, consisting of Lieutenant Colonel Danowitz and Company D, touched down at the airfield at 05:20 on 3 May 1965. By 21:00 the entire battalion was in Santo Domingo, Dominican Republic.

On 4 May 1965, upon orders from RLT-6, the 1st Battalion, 8th Marines was transported by helicopters from San Isidro into LZ-4 where it established its Command Post in the Belle Vista Golf House located next to the Embajador Hotel. For the next three days the battalion's and attached units' vehicles moved through the newly opened LOC with all the landing teams equipment and supplies. The battalion was directed to provide security in its area of responsibility around the golf course and to provide one officer and 60 enlisted men for the security of the beach supply area (Red Beach) at Haina.

The 3rd Battalion 6th Marines was relieved by 1st Battalion 8th Marines on 10 May 1965. After moving into its new positions, 1/8 was directed to straighten the eastern boundary along Phase line CAIRO. The battalion also assumed the responsibility for providing security to the American Embassy. The final withdrawal of Marine units began on 2 June 1965. The 1st Battalion 8th Marines was relieved in place by the U.S. Army's 1st Battalion, 325th Airborne Infantry. 1/8 embarked on board the USS Monrovia (APA-31) and the ship departed the area for Morehead City, North Carolina, arriving on 6 June. 1/8 suffered 4 Marines wounded in action (WIA) during the campaign.

=== Multinational Force in Lebanon ===
The battalion participated as part of the multinational peace keeping force in Lebanon, May – November 1983. On Sunday morning at 06:22, October 23, 1983, Battalion Landing Team 1/8, the ground combat element of the 24th Marine Amphibious Unit, was the main victim of what came to be known as the Beirut barracks bombing when a truck loaded with 12,000 pounds of explosives crashed through the gates of the BLT headquarters at the airport in Beirut, Lebanon. Casualties that day were 220 Marines, 18 sailors, and 3 soldiers killed with an additional 100 injured. The majority of these casualties were from 1/8.

=== Operation Desert Shield and Desert Storm ===
In December 1990 1/8 deployed to Saudi Arabia as part of Operation Desert Shield where it remained until Operation Desert Storm began in February 1991. On February 24, 1991, at 06:15, 1/8, which was designated as one of three assault battalions leading the way for the 2nd Marine Division, reported to be at the edge of the obstacle belt in lanes Green 5 and 6. The enemy's defensive belts consisted of the two minefields and the wire obstacles noted in earlier intelligence reports. The Green lanes, carrying 1/8 were not as quickly cleared as the Red and Blue lanes. Several of the engineer vehicles had struck mines and been put out of action. Line charges had caught on overhead power lines, or had failed to detonate.

On the right, between two minefield, 1st Battalion, 8th Marines, encountered Iraqi troops. Company A had the mission of guarding the battalion's flank in this area; accordingly, the 3d Platoon was ordered to secure a building, surrounded by a chain-link fence, located 800 meters to the east. The platoon was mounted in assault amphibious vehicles. As they came within 300 meters of the building, Iraqi soldiers inside it opened fire with rocket-propelled grenades. The platoon dismounted, and under cover of the vehicles' .50-caliber machine guns, attacked through volleys of grenades.

Within 100 meters of the building the platoon was pinned down by automatic weapons fire. The 3d Squad was ordered to attack the building while the rest of the platoon laid down covering fires. In open view of the Iraqis and under fire, Sergeant William J. Warren, leader of the 3d Squad, stood up and moved among his fire teams, giving orders and encouraging his men. He maneuvered his teams to within 20 meters of the building, and then led an assault through a hole in the fence.

As the squad entered the building, the shaken Iraqi troops fled from it, seeking escape across the desert. By 10:20 that morning, all three assault battalions (1/6, 1/8, and 2/2) of the 2nd Marine Division were reporting that they were in contact with the enemy. On the right 1/8 was still coming through the breach on lanes Green 5 and 6. It then moved into an Iraqi brigade-size position in which it destroyed a large number of tanks and APCs. By nightfall of the first day of the ground war 1/8 had met General Key's intent and successfully moved through the breaches.

On 25 February 1991 (G+1) at 06:20 the "Reveille Counterattack" began. Apparently maneuvering to hit the regiment's logistics trains, a battalion-sized Iraqi unit of tanks and mechanized infantry collided with 1st Battalion 8th Marines. Fighting back with its own attached tanks and air support, the battalion accounted for 39 Iraqi tank and APC "kills". In the crucial first minutes of this attack, Sergeant Scott A. Dotson led his vehicle-mounted TOW section up to positions from which it could most effectively engage the enemy armor. Although under heavy fire itself, within minutes this section had destroyed eight Iraqi tanks.

This attack may have been a part of a brigade-sized counterattack; its disruption caused die hard enemy survivors to move into prepared positions, where they would be encountered the next day. As the 8th Marines (1/8, 2/4, and 3/23) came up into position on the right flank of the 2nd Marine Division's zone, certain adjustments had to be made. 1/8 was returned to the operational control of its parent regiment by nightfall; since it was already in the 8th Marines' zone, no movement was required. During the morning attack, the 1st Battalion 8th Marines was moving forward as the division's easternmost battalion.

The third day of the ground war, 26 February 1991 (G+2), also began with an antitank engagement. Throughout the morning, all division elements were reporting the movements of, and engagements with, enemy formations. However, 1st Battalion 8th Marines, was to be the focus of the enemy's attention once again. The battalion had arrived along Phase Line Horse the previous evening (25 February), and was the right flank battalion of the entire 2nd Marine Division.

The commanding officer, Lieutenant Colonel Bruce A. Gombar, had positioned his battalion into an L-shaped defensive position for the night, in order to secure this eastern flank. The unit was set along two roads, the main north–south road leading from Kuwait City, and an east–west road intersecting with it just above the area of the "ice-cube." Company A was on the battalion's right, facing east, and supported by a combined anti-armor team. In the center was the tank company attached to the battalion, Company B of the 4th Tank Battalion, which was set in along the intersection of the two roads. On the left was Company C, 1/8 also supported by an antiarmor team from weapons platoons, supplemented by attached antitank TOW unit.

At 02:30 1/8 was struck by a two-pronged attack of APCs and dismounted infantry coming from the northeast and northwest. The attack hit the road intersection held by the tank company and the boundary between 1/8 and 2/4 which was set in at the "ice-cube." The battalion's eastern flank also received some accurate artillery fire, causing five casualties. The battalion's tanks and CAT Platoon worked very effectively at beating back this attack. They destroyed several enemy armored vehicles, some of them within only 75 meters of the battle positions. Pushing through to the final objectives, 1/8 was placed on the division's extreme right, tied in with the 1st Battalion 5th Marines of the 1st Marine Division. The battalion aimed at two small hills, from which it could control the road, as its objectives. Near to these was a suspected Iraqi strongpoint in an agricultural area known as the "Dairy Farm." Artillery fired preparation missions on this area as the companies began their final assaults on their objectives. In gathering darkness the battalion's progress slowed as it entered the increasingly restrictive nature of a more urban area.

By 18:00 on 26 February, 1/8 had secured its section of the road and established anti-tank ambushes along it. In its movement north the 1st Battalion 8th Marines bypassed some Iraqi formations. With Al Jahrah secured by nightfall and Arab forces bypassing the division on 27 February 1991, the day's action would be the last of the war. During the war the following units were attached to 1/8: Company B, 4th Tank Battalion; Company C, 2d Combat Engineer Battalion; Company D, 2d Assault Amphibian Battalion.

By mid-March 1/8 was preparing to move back to Saudi Arabia, and by April they were preparing for redeployment back to Camp Lejeune, NC. The cost to the 2nd Marine Division was six killed in action, and 38 wounded. There were also three non-battle deaths and 36 non-battle wounded.

=== Subsequent operations (1991–2001) ===
- From September 1993 to March 1994, BLT 1/8 participated in support of Operation Restore Hope in Somalia (November 1993), Southwest Asia "Cease Fire" Campaign on board the USS Guadalcanal in the Red Sea and Gulf of Aden (17 Oct 1993 - 10 Nov 1993), and supported Operation Provide Promise and Operation Deny Flight in Bosnia (September to October 1993 and January 1994).
- Elements of 1/8 participated in support of Operation Support Democracy, Caribbean Area, May to July 1994.
- Elements of 1/8 participated in Operation Sea Signal in Cuba, June to July 1994.
- In March - April 1997, 1st Battalion 8th Marines conducted a non-combatant evacuation operation (NEO) of Americans and Allies from the embassy in Tirana, Albania during Operation Silver Wake.
- Just as Operation Silver Wake wrapped up the Marines of Headquarters & Service Company, Alpha Company, Bravo Company, and Weapons Company were sent off the Coast of Zaire/Congo for Operation Guardian Retrieval.
- Deploying in October 2000, as the BLT of the 22nd MEU, elements of 1/8 deployed to Kosovo and Croatia as part of Operation Joint Guardian. BLT 1/8 and the 22nd MEU returned home in May 2001.

=== Global war on terrorism and additional operations (2001–present) ===
==== Iraq War ====
- April–May 2003

On 5 March 2003 Battalion Landing Team (BLT) 1/8 departed Camp Lejeune, North Carolina, with the 26th Marine Expeditionary Unit (MEU) on board the USS Iwo Jima (LHD-7), USS Nashville (LPD-13), and USS Carter-Hall (LSD-50). The 26th MEU sailed directly to the eastern Mediterranean Sea in order to prepare for the potential invasion of Iraq. Following the Turkish government's denial of the usage of their country for a northern invasion, BLT 1/8 was forced to deploy from Crete and fly nearly 1,100 miles via U.S. Marine C-130 transport aircraft and 440 miles from the far Eastern Mediterranean Sea via CH-53 and CH-46 helicopters into Northern Iraq. On 12 April, the battalion began combat operations in Irbil and Mosul, Iraq as part of Combined Joint Special Operations Task Force - North (TF - Viking) for Operation Iraqi Freedom. During combat operations in Iraq, 1/8 suffered 1 Marine wounded in action (WIA) on 21 April 2003 from Weapons Company 81mm Mortar Platoon during a night-time probing attack on the Mosul Airport. By 1 May 2003, the battalion was relieved by the U.S. Army's 101st Airborne Division. The battalion withdrew from Mosul, Iraq and returned to the Iwo Jima ARG waiting in the Mediterranean Sea.

- June 2004-January 2005

The battalion deployed in June 2004 to Iraq as a part of Regimental Combat Team 1 and later RCT-7, 1st Marine Division (Reinforced). From June 2004 to January 2005, 1/8 conducted combat operations in Al Anbar Province in Area of Operations (AO) Denver and later AO Raleigh, including operations in Rawa, Anah, Little Anah, Haditha, Baghdadi, Barwana, Abu Buyatt, ASP Wolf, Hit, Al Asad, Haqlanyih, Karmah, Naser Wa Saleem, Abu Ghuraib, and Fallujah.

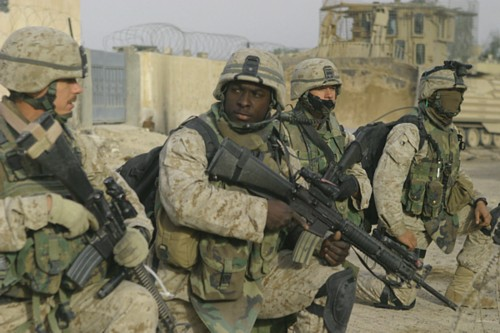
U.S. Marines prepare to step off on a patrol through the city of Fallujah, Iraq, to clear the city of insurgent activity and weapons caches as part of Operation al Fajr (New Dawn) on Nov. 26, 2004.

1st Battalion 8th Marines was one of the lead battalions during Operation Phantom Fury from 8 November to 9 December 2004 leading the assault into Fallujah. During combat operations in Iraq from June 2004-January 2005, 1st Battalion 8th Marines (Reinforced) suffered 21 Marines killed in action (KIA) and nearly 150 Marines wounded in action (WIA) with 17 KIA's and 102 WIA's coming in three weeks in Fallujah in November 2004. 1/8 conducted a relief in place with their sister battalion 3/8 and returned to Camp Lejeune by 1 February 2005.

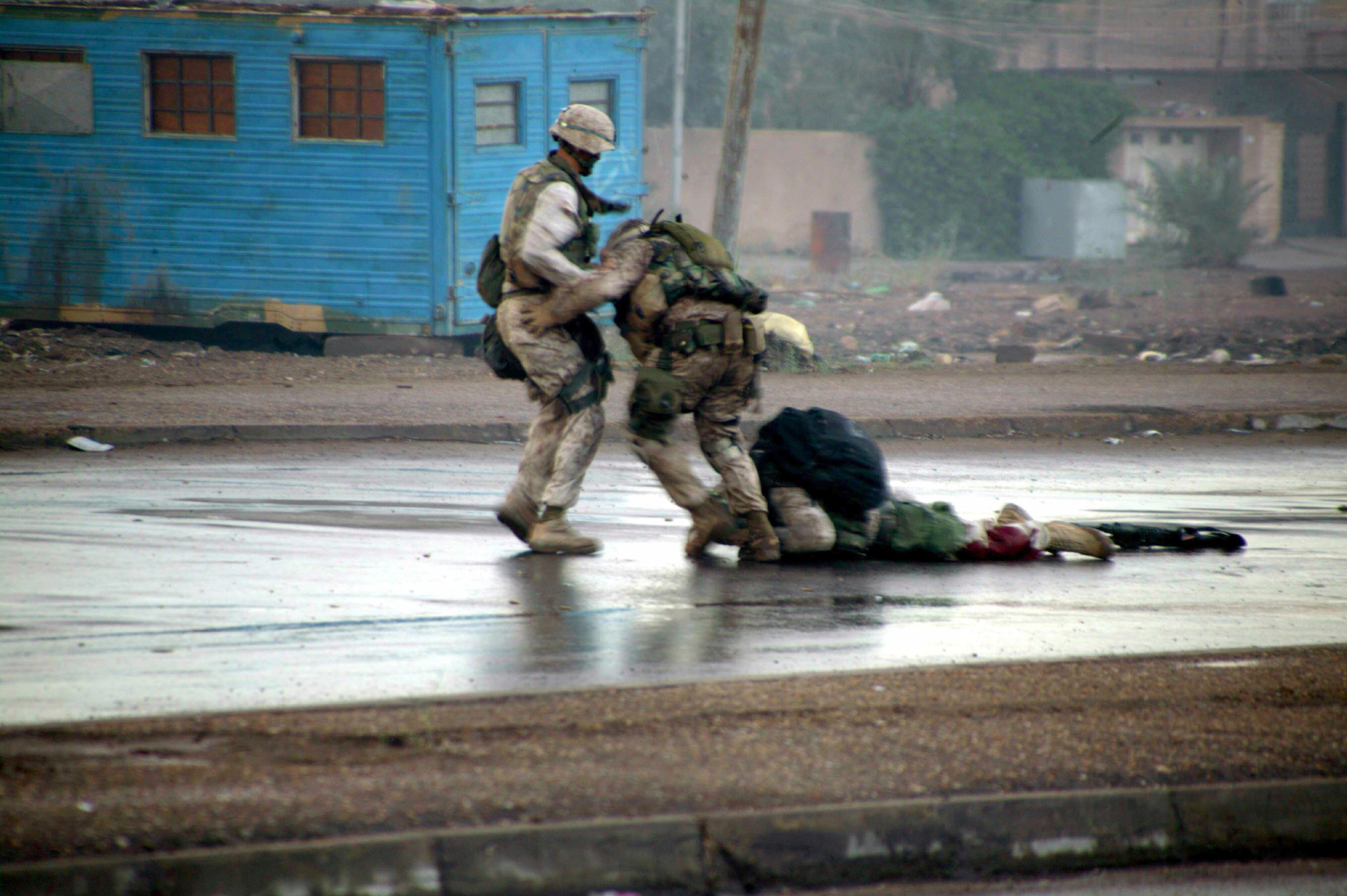
Two Marines attempting to recover a fellow wounded 1/8 Marine. During Operation Phantom Fury, November 2004.

- August–November 2006

From 6 June - 6 December 2006, 1/8 was the Battalion Landing Team of the 24th Marine Expeditionary Unit. Various elements of 1/8 conducted combat operations in Iraq. One Marine from 1/8 Scout Sniper Platoon was killed in action and several other 1/8 Marines and a Corpsman were wounded on 1 November 2006, while conducting operations in Haditha, Iraq.

- September 2007 – April 2008

In September 2007, the battalion deployed a fourth time to Ar-Ramadi in Al Anbar Province in support of Operation Iraqi Freedom. The Battalion suffered one Marine killed in action and numerous others wounded during combat operations. The battalion was instrumental in denying the enemy freedom of movement and as a result violence in the war ravaged city declined.

- March–September 2009

In 2009, 1/8 returned to Iraq for its fifth and final rotation to Al-Taqaddum in Al Anbar Province in support of Operation Iraqi Freedom. In June, the battalion lost a Marine due to a non-hostile incident.

AFGHANISTAN CAMPAIGN

- August 2010–March 2011

In August 2010, 1st Battalion, 8th Marines deployed to Musa'Qaleh and Now Zad, Afghanistan in support of Operation Enduring Freedom 10–2, Regimental Combat Team 2, First Marine Division (Forward), I Marine Expeditionary Force (Forward) Afghanistan as part of the International Security Assistance Force. The unit's performance in counter-insurgency operations in the two districts were integral in the stabilization of the region and development of Afghan National Security Forces. 1/8 suffered the loss of five Marines and one Navy Hospital Corpsman that were killed in action and numerous others wounded in action during their deployment to Helmand Province.

- January 2012-August 2012

From January to August 2012, 1st Battalion, 8th Marines deployed to Afghanistan again to conduct counter-insurgency operations in Northern Helmand Province. 1/8 suffered three Marines and one Navy Hospital Corpsman killed in action during their second deployment to Helmand Province.

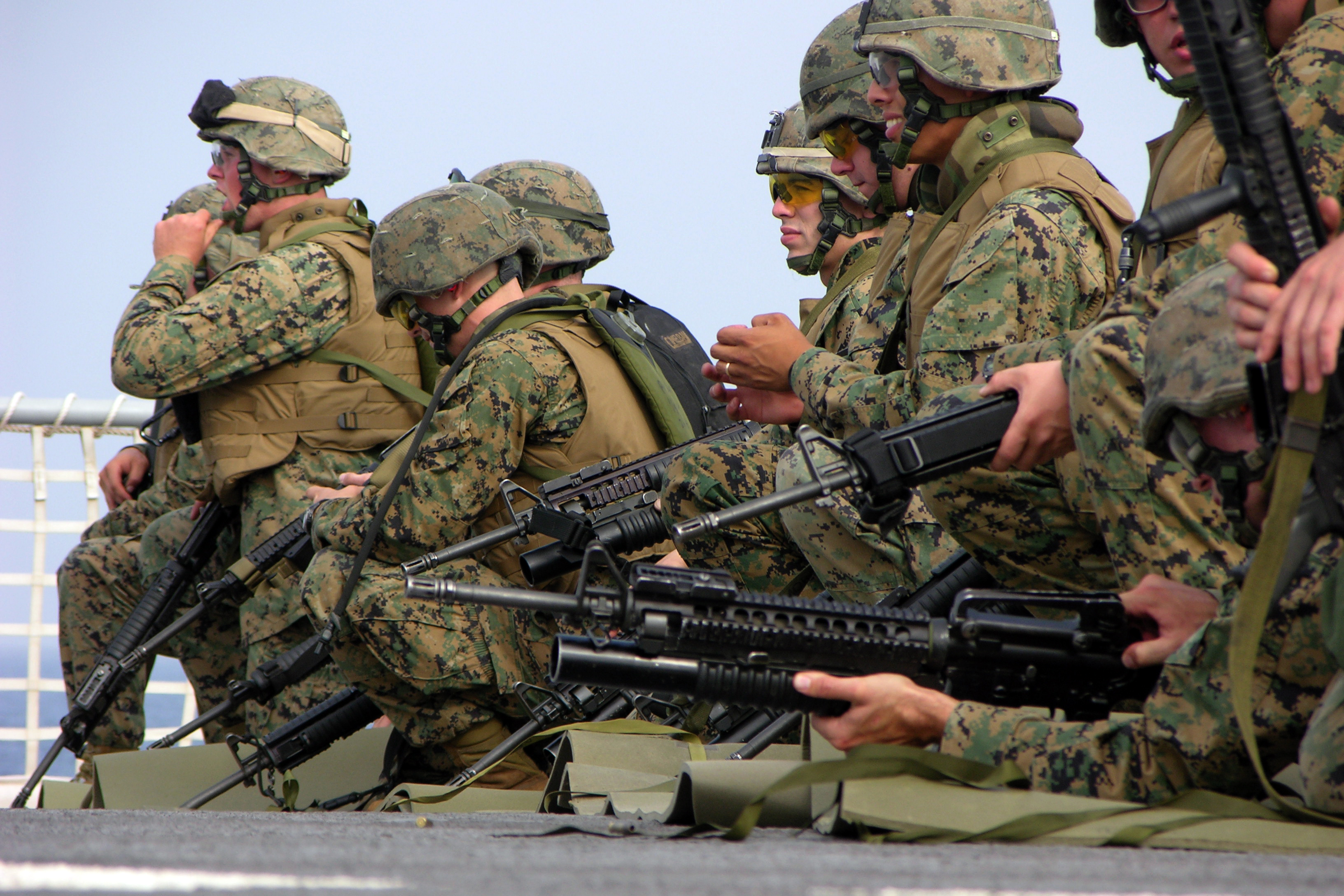
Marines take a look at their targets following marksmanship training

- August 2021

Battalion Landing Team 1/8, as a part of the 24th Marine Expeditionary Unit, was sent to the Hamid Karzai International Airport (HKIA) in Kabul, Afghanistan, to assist with a noncombat evacuation operation. The battalion secured the perimeter of the airport and processed thousands of people for evacuation out of the country. Several 1/8 Marines were wounded during the operation.

ADDITIONAL OPERATIONS

HORN OF AFRICA

- June–July 2003

After leaving Mosul in May 2003, 1/8 took part in a training exercises in Albania, received port calls to Crete, Malta, and Italy, and conducted training and counter-terrorism operations in Djibouti, as well as remaining in the Persian Gulf on board ship as a reserve force for the U.S. Central Command. While in the Persian Gulf, the MEU received a port call to the United Arab Emerites.

LIBERIA

- July–September 2003

As the situation began to rapidly deteriorate, 1/8 and the 26th MEU were ordered to Liberia. The MEU left the coast of Ethiopia and the Horn of Africa, sailed back through the Suez Canal and took up a position off the coast of the west African nation. In an impressive show of force, the U.S.S. Iwo Jima Amphibious Ready Group sailed in-line roughly 3 miles off the coast of Liberia. On 14 August 2003, elements of the battalion eventually inserted into Roberts International Airport and at the Freeport of Monrovia on Bushrod Island outside of Monrovia, Liberia as part of Operation Sheltering Sky. A rifle company from 1/8 and supporting units from the 26th MEU conducted airfield security operations as part of Joint Task Force Liberia in an effort to facilitate the transition of governmental operations from the regime of Charles Taylor to a democratically elected government.

Following port visits to Rota, Spain and Lisbon, Portugal where Marines and sailors of the 26th MEU manned the rails, the battalion finally returned to Camp Lejeune, NC on the 20th anniversary of the Beirut barracks bombing on 23 October 2003.

LOUISIANA

- Hurricane Katrina 2005

While serving as a rapid ready force, 1/8 was called upon to help provide security and perform humanitarian operations in New Orleans following the devastation of the Category 5 storm. A small contingent of Alpha Company Marines were allowed to travel to Alabama in order to repair storm damage of fallen A Co. 1/8 Marine Bradley Faircloth's mother's home.

LEBANON

- July 2006

On 6 June 2006 1st Battalion 8th Marines deployed as the ground combat element of the 24th Marine Expeditionary Unit. On 18 July 2006, it was announced that the 24th MEU, along with the Iwo Jima Expeditionary Strike Group, would be directed to Lebanon, to assist in the evacuation of almost 15,000 U.S. nationals who had become trapped in Lebanon, following a series of Israeli strikes which made the Beirut International Airport nonoperational, and similarly destroyed a number of major roads out of the country. This would become known as the largest evacuation of American citizens from a foreign country since the Vietnam War.

== Unit awards ==
A unit citation or commendation is an award bestowed upon an organization for the action cited. Members of the unit who participated in said actions are allowed to wear on their uniforms the awarded unit citation. 1st Battalion, 8th Marines has been presented with the following awards:

Streamer	Award	Year(s)	Additional Info
	Presidential Unit Citation Streamer w/ three Bronze Stars	1942, 1943, 1945, 2021	Guadalcanal, Tarawa, Okinawa, Afghanistan
	Navy Unit Commendation Streamer w/ one Silver Star	1983, 2003, 2004–5, 2006, 2007–08, 2009	Lebanon, Iraq, Iraq, Lebanon, Iraq, Iraq
	Meritorious Unit Commendation Streamer	1997	Albania
	Marine Corps Expeditionary Streamer w/ one Bronze star	1958, 1983	Lebanon, Lebanon
	American Defense Service Streamer	1941	World War II
	American Campaign Streamer	1941-45	
	Asiatic-Pacific Campaign Streamer w/ one Silver Star	1942, 1943, 1944, 1944, 1945	Guadalcanal, Tarawa, Saipan, Tinian, Okinawa
	World War II Victory Streamer	1941–1945	Pacific War
	Navy Occupation Service Streamer with "ASIA"	1945-46	Japan
	National Defense Service Streamer with three Bronze Stars	1950–1954, 1961–1974, 1990–1995, 2001–present	Korean War, Vietnam War, Gulf War, war on terrorism
	Armed Forces Expeditionary Streamer w/ two Bronze Stars	1962, 1983, 1993	Cuban Missile Crisis, Dominican Republic, Lebanon
	Southwest Asia Service Streamer w/ two Bronze Stars		
	Afghanistan Campaign Streamer w/ two Bronze Stars		
	Iraq Campaign Streamer w/ one Silver and two Bronze Stars		
	Global War on Terrorism Expeditionary Streamer		
	Global War on Terrorism Service Streamer	2001–present	

=== Navy Cross recipients ===
- Private First Class Clarence Lee Evans - Company A, 1st Battalion 8th Marines, awarded (Posthumously) for actions on Guadalcanal, Solomon Islands 23 November 1942.
- Private William F. Richey - Company A, 1st Battalion 8th Marines (Rein.), awarded (Posthumously) for actions on Guadalcanal, Solomon Islands 23 November 1942.
- 2nd Lieutenant Mark Tomlinson - Company A, 1st Battalion 8th Marines, awarded (Posthumously) for actions on Betio Island, Tarawa Atoll, Gilbert Islands 21 November 1943.
- Platoon Sergeant Frank W. Justice - Company A, 1st Battalion, 8th Marines, awarded for actions on Tinian, Northern Marianas Islands 31 July 1944.
- Sergeant Aubrey McDade - Company B, Weapons Platoon, awarded for actions in Fallujah, Al Anbar Province, Iraq on 11 Nov 2004.
- Lance Corporal Dominic D. Esquibel - Headquarters & Service Company, Scout Sniper Platoon (attached to Bravo Company), awarded for actions in Fallujah, Al Anbar Province, Iraq on 25 Nov 2004.

== Notable former members ==
- Barney Ross, served in B Company in World War II, receiving a Silver Star and Purple Heart for his actions on Guadalcanal. Ross was one of the few boxers to hold titles in the lightweight, light welterweight, and welterweight divisions. He has been inducted into the International Boxing Hall of Fame, the World Boxing Hall of Fame, the Chicagoland Sports Hall of Fame, the International Jewish Sports Hall of Fame and the National Jewish Sports Hall of Fame, as well as the Marine Corps Sports Hall of Fame.
- Alan Fiers, earned a Bronze Star for valor and Purple Heart while serving with 1/8 in the Dominican Republic in 1965. Fiers would go on to work for the CIA and ended his career due to his involvement in the Iran-Contra Affair.
- Pat Young, served in C Company from 2001 to 2005. He was elected to the Maryland House of Delegates representing District 44B in 2014.
- Roland James, served in B Company and was killed in action on Saipan on 23 June 1944. In 1956, Corporal James was chosen by the Associated Press to represent the "Typical American Serviceman" who died in the service of his country during all wars. The article ran on the front page of hundreds of newspapers across the country for Memorial Day.
- James Blake Miller, also known as the Marlboro Marine, served within Charlie Company, 1st Battalion, 8th Marines.

== See also ==
- Organization of the United States Marine Corps
- List of United States Marine Corps battalions

== Additional reading ==
- Fighting for Fallujah: A New Dawn for Iraq, by John R. Ballard (2006)(ISBN 0275990559)
- Whiskey Tango Foxtrot, A Photographer's Chronicle of the Iraq War, by Ashley Gilbertson (2007) (ISBN 0226293254)
- The Root, The Marines In Beirut, August 1982-February 1984, by Eric Hammel (1985) (ISBN 979-8680335994)
- On Call in Hell: A Doctor's Iraq War Story, by Cdr. Richard Jadick (2007) (ISBN 0-451-22053-6)
- Faithful Warriors: A Combat Marine Remembers the Pacific War, by LtCol. Dean Ladd USMCR (Ret.) & Steven Weingartner (2013) (ISBN 1591144353)
- Fallujah With Honor: First Battalion, Eighth Marine's Role in Operation Phantom Fury, by Gary Livingston (2006) (ISBN 1-928724-06-X)
- No True Glory: A Frontline Account of the Battle for Fallujah, by Bing West (2005) (ISBN 978-0-553-80402-7)
- Three Block War: Phatom Fury, by Matt Zeigler (2014)
