= Logistics Combat Element =

Logistics component of the U.S. Marine Corps' Marine Air-Ground Task Forces

In the United States Marine Corps, the Logistics Combat Element (LCE), formerly Combat Service Support Element, is the portion of the Marine Air-Ground Task Force (MAGTF) responsible with providing logistical support. It provides equipment and personnel to keep the MAGTF running logistically.

The logistics combat element (LCE), organized into battalions, regiments, and groups, has its own headquarters element for command and control (management and planning for manpower, intelligence, operations and training, and logistics functions) of its subordinate units and contains the majority of the combat service support units for the MAGTF, including: heavy motor transport, ground supply, heavy engineer support, ground equipment maintenance, and advanced medical and dental units, along with certain specialized groups such as air delivery, EOD, and landing support teams.

The size of the LCE varies in proportion to the size of the MAGTF. A Marine Expeditionary Force has a Marine Logistics Group or MLG. A Marine Expeditionary Brigade holds a Combat Logistics Regiment or CLR, often reinforced with equipment and personnel from other logistics units. The various Marine Expeditionary Units command a reinforced Combat Logistics Battalion. Generally, MEF postings are permanent, while MEBs and MEUs rotate their GCE, ACE, and LCE twice annually.

== Hierarchy of Marine logistics units ==
=== 1st Marine Logistics Group ===
LCE of I Marine Expeditionary Force

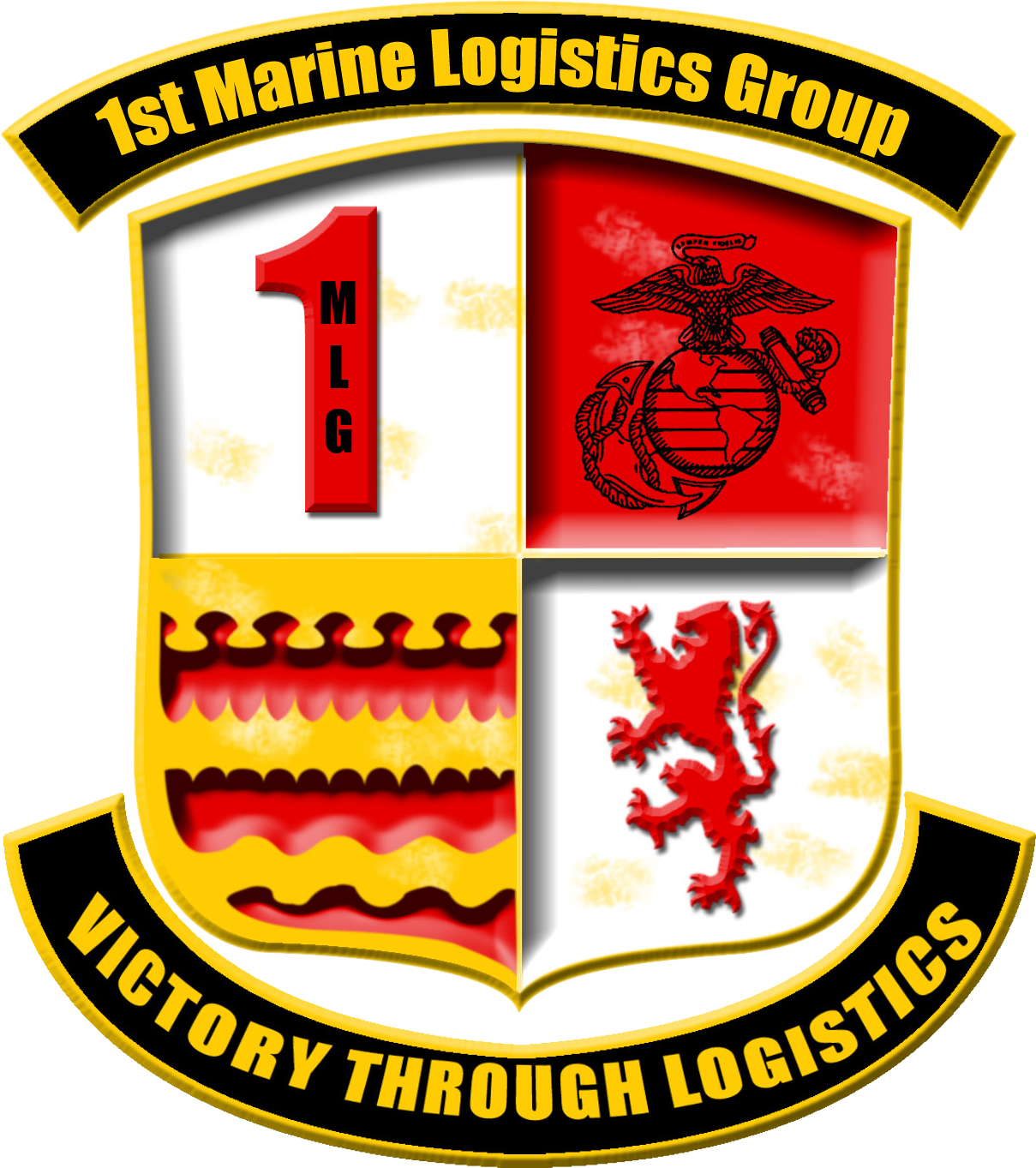

Battalion Name	Insignia	Nickname
Headquarters & Service Battalion		
1st Dental Battalion		
7th Engineer Support Battalion		

==== Combat Logistics Regiment 1 ====
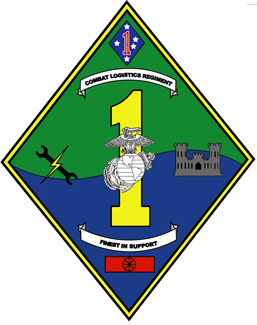

Battalion Name	Insignia	Nickname
Combat Logistics Battalion 1		
Combat Logistics Battalion 5		
Combat Logistics Battalion 7		
1st Transportation Battalion		
1st Landing Support Battalion		

==== Combat Logistics Regiment 15 ====
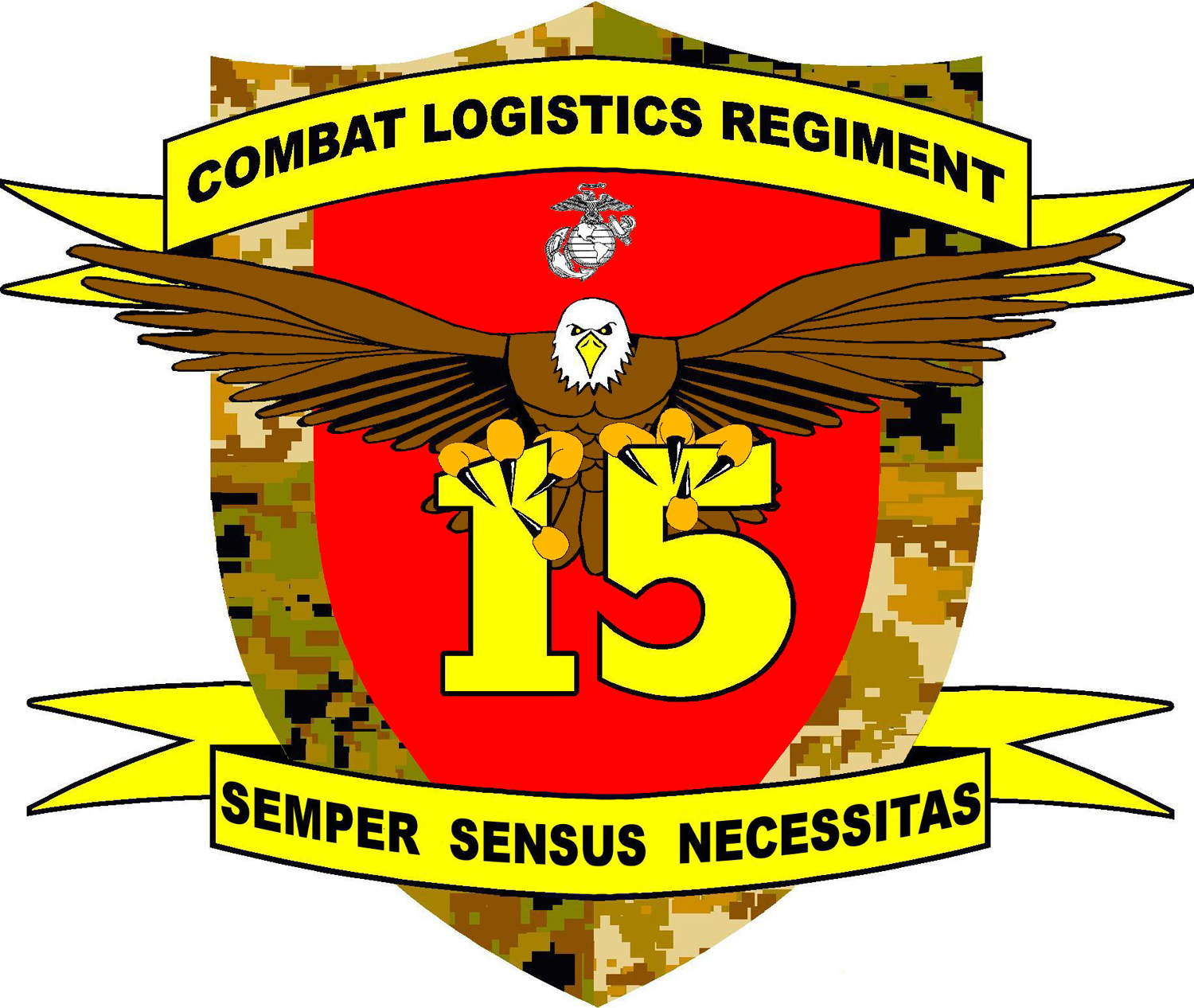

Battalion Name	Insignia	Nickname
1st Maintenance Battalion		Warfighters
1st Medical Battalion		
1st Supply Battalion		Dragon Warriors
Combat Logistics Company 11		
Combat Logistics Company 16		Los Lobos

==== Combat Logistics Regiment 17 ====
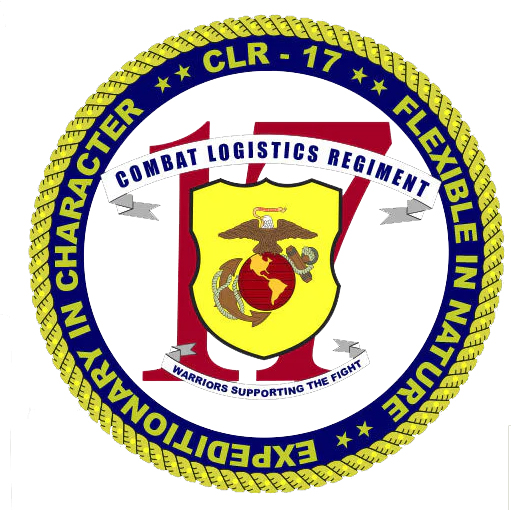

Battalion Name	Insignia	Nickname
Combat Logistics Battalion 11		
Combat Logistics Battalion 13		Lucky
Combat Logistics Battalion 15		Blackout

=== 2nd Marine Logistics Group ===
LCE of II Marine Expeditionary Force

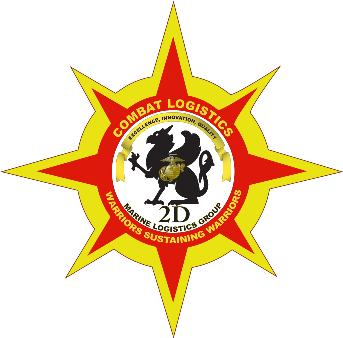

Battalion Name	Insignia	Nickname
Headquarters and Service Battalion		
2nd Dental Battalion		
8th Engineer Support Battalion		

==== Combat Logistics Regiment 2 ====
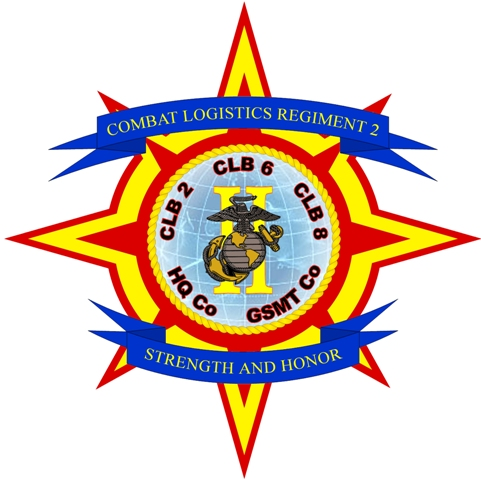

Battalion Name	Insignia	Nickname
Combat Logistics Battalion 2		
Combat Logistics Battalion 6		
Combat Logistics Battalion 8		
2nd Transportation Battalion		
2nd Landing Support Battalion		

==== Combat Logistics Regiment 25 ====
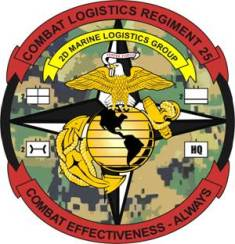

Battalion Name	Insignia	Nickname
2nd Maintenance Battalion		
2nd Supply Battalion		
2nd Medical Battalion		
Combat Logistics Company 21		
Combat Logistics Company 23		Roughnecks

==== Combat Logistics Regiment 27 ====
Battalion Name	Insignia	Nickname
Combat Logistics Battalion 22		
Combat Logistics Battalion 24		
Combat Logistics Battalion 26		
2nd Military Police Battalion		

=== 3rd Marine Logistics Group ===
LCE of III Marine Expeditionary Force

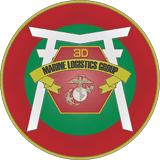

Battalion Name	Insignia	Nickname
Headquarters and Service Battalion		
3rd Dental Battalion		
9th Engineer Support Battalion		

==== Combat Logistics Regiment 3 ====
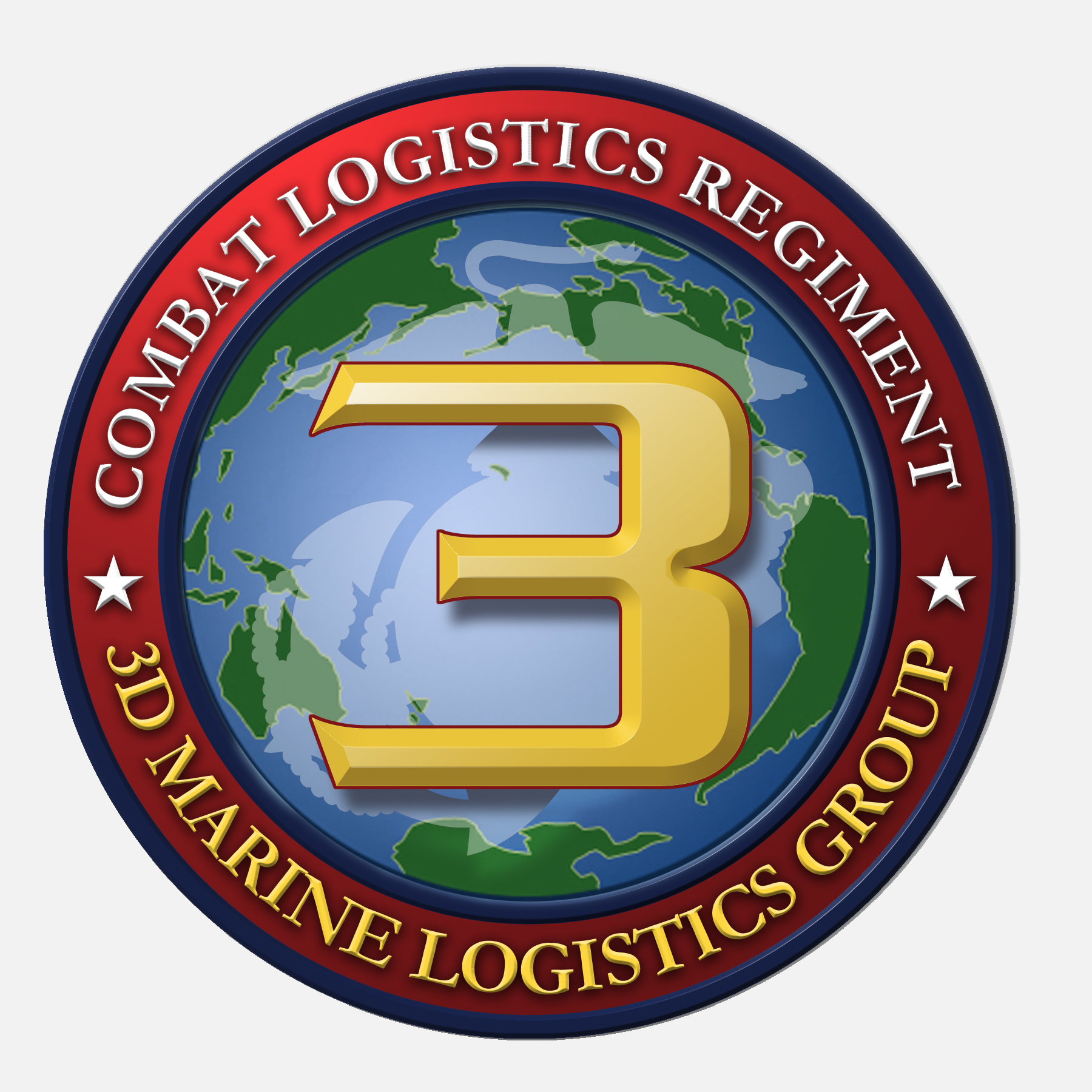

Battalion Name	Insignia	Nickname
Combat Logistics Battalion 3		
Combat Logistics Battalion 4		The Supporting Edge
3d Landing Support Battalion		
3d Transportation Support Battalion		Rough Riders

==== Combat Logistics Regiment 35 ====
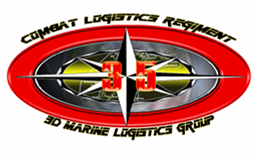

Battalion Name	Insignia	Nickname
3rd Medical Battalion		
3rd Maintenance Battalion		
3rd Supply Battalion		
Combat Logistics Company 35		
Combat Logistics Company 36		Dragons

==== Combat Logistics Regiment 37 ====
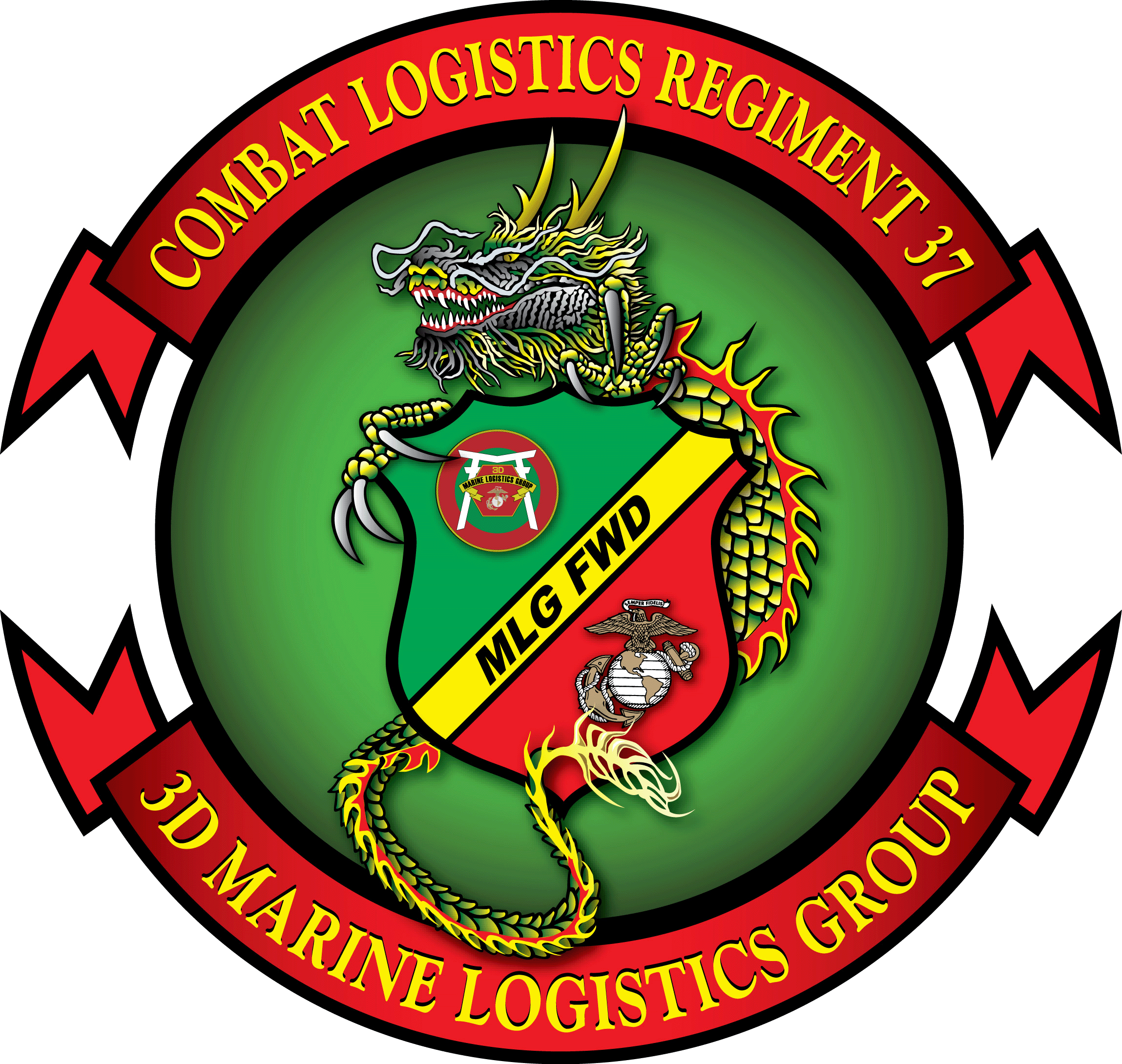

Battalion Name	Insignia	Nickname
Combat Logistics Battalion 31		Atlas Battalion

=== 4th Marine Logistics Group ===
LCE of Marine Forces Reserve

Battalion Name	Insignia	Nickname
Headquarters and Service Battalion		
4th Maintenance Battalion		
4th Supply Battalion		
6th Engineer Battalion		
6th Motor Transport Battalion		
4th Medical Battalion		
4th Dental Battalion		
4th Landing Support Battalion		
6th Communications Battalion; Note: also falls under CE, Marine Forces Reserve		

== See also ==
- List of United States Marine Corps Combat Logistics Companies
- Marine Air-Ground Task Force
- List of United States Marine Corps logistics groups
- List of United States Marine Corps regiments
- List of United States Marine Corps battalions
