= Combat Logistics Regiment 37 =

Combat Logistics Regiment 37, 3d Marine Logistics Group
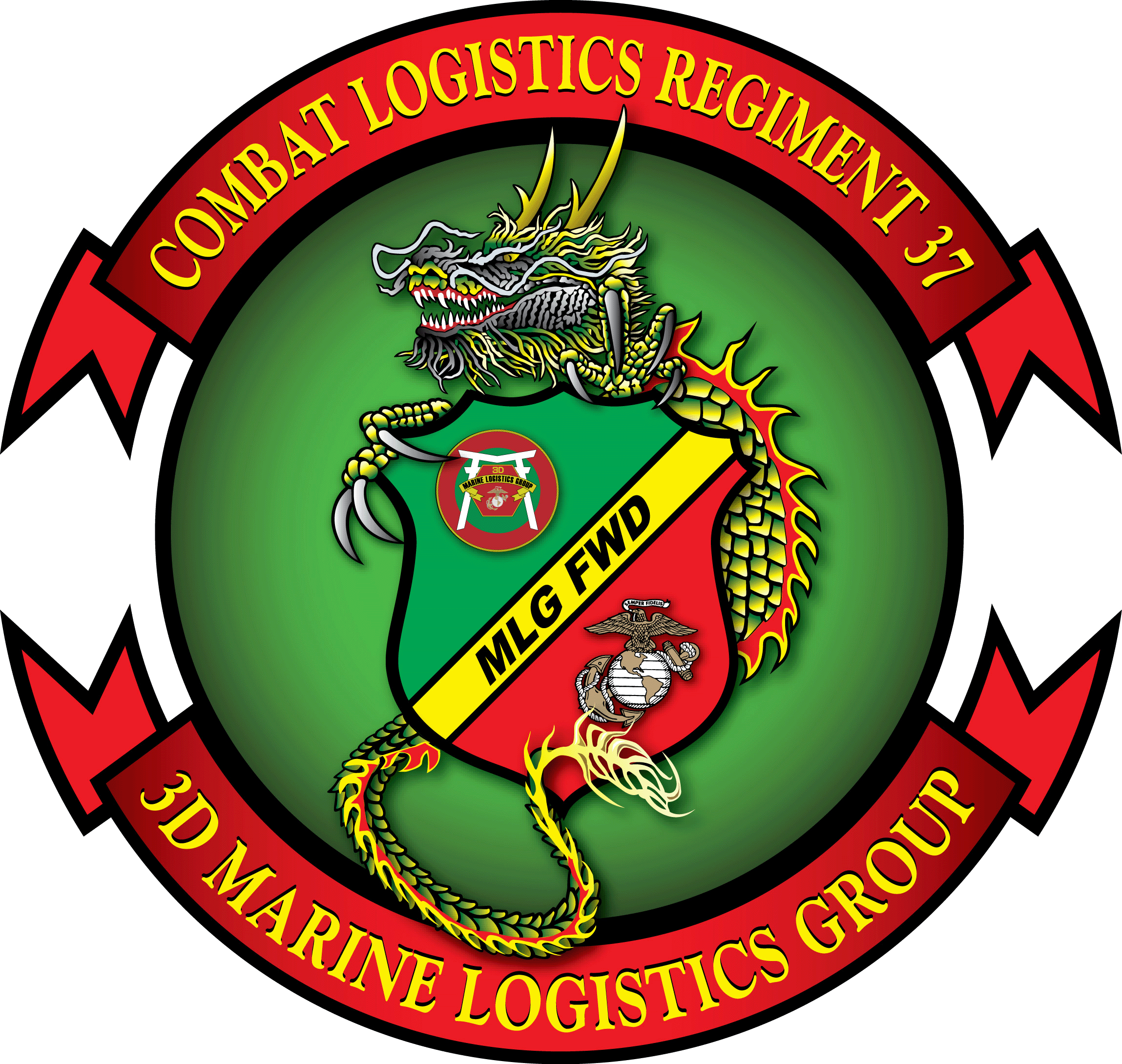
- CLR-37 crest designed by Sgt. Cody Perry in 2007
- Country: United States
- Allegiance: United States of America
- Branch: United States Marine Corps
- Type: Logistics/Headquarters
- Role: Logistics Support and Command and Control Support
- Size: Regiment
- Part of: 3rd Marine Logistics Group; III Marine Expeditionary Force
- Garrison/HQ: Marine Corps Base Camp Smedley D. Butler
- Nickname: Tatsu "Dragon"

Commanders
- Current commander: Colonel Robert P. Gerbracht
- Notable commanders: Brigadier General Thomas A. Gorry

Combat Logistics Regiment 37 (formerly Headquarters Regiment), 3rd MLG is a logistics regiment of the United States Marine Corps. It is part of the 3rd Marine Logistics Group and III Marine Expeditionary Force (III MEF). The unit is based out of the Marine Corps Base Camp Kinser, Okinawa, Japan.

== Mission ==
Provide command and control, administration, food services, and services, to the Marine Logistics Group (MLG). Serve as the forward echeloning headquarters of the MLG or as the Logistics Command Element (LCE) Headquarters for a Marine Expeditionary Brigade sized Marine Air-Ground Task Force. Provide the LCE for Marine Expeditionary Units.

== Subordinate units ==
- 9th Engineer Support Battalion
- Headquarters and Service Company
- Combat Logistics Company 34
- Food Service Company
- Communications Company
- Regional Disbursing Office - Pacific

== History ==
This unit was formerly known as Headquarters Battalion, 3rd Force Service Support Group (FSSG) but officially changed its designation to Combat Logistics Regiment 37, 3rd Marine Logistics Group (MLG) on October 20, 2006. The unit changed its designation on September 30, 2014, to Headquarters Regiment, 3rd MLG; but was then redesignated back to Combat Logistics Regiment 37 on November 4, 2018.

== See also ==
- List of United States Marine Corps regiments
- Organization of the United States Marine Corps
