= 3rd Dental Battalion =

U.S. Navy battalion supporting the U.S. Marine Corps

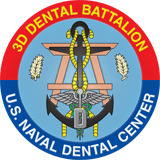
- 3rd Dental Battalion insignia
- Active: November 1, 1979 - present
- Country: United States
- Branch: USN
- Type: Dental
- Role: Ensure dental readiness
- Part of: 3rd Marine Logistics Group; III Marine Expeditionary Force (Bureau of Medicine and Surgery)
- Garrison/HQ: Camp Smedley Butler, Okinawa, Japan
- Motto(s): World's best care for the world's best patients.
- Engagements: Vietnam War; Operation Enduring Freedom

The 3rd Dental Battalion is a unit of the United States Navy that supports United States Marine Corps forces on Okinawa, Japan. The battalion includes nine dental clinics, approximately 77 Dental Officers, 4 Medical Service Corps officers, 181 Dental Technicians, and 26 civilians. The unit is based out of Camp Foster and falls under the command of the 3rd Marine Logistics Group and the III Marine Expeditionary Force.

== Mission ==
Ensure dental readiness and optimize dental health for all beneficiaries while supporting operational and humanitarian mission.

== Subordinate units ==
- Headquarters and Services Company
- 3rd Dental Company
- 11th Dental Company
- 21st Dental Company
- U.S. Naval Dental Center.

== History ==
The 3rd Dental Battalion was activated on November 1, 1979, at Camp Kinser, Okinawa, Japan and assigned to the 3rd Force Service Support Group, Fleet Marine Forces, Pacific. 3rd Dental Company and 11th Dental Company were activated in 1955. Both companies served in the Republic of Vietnam from June 1965 to November 1969 and were awarded the Presidential Unit Citation, the National Defense Service Medal, Vietnam Service Medal and the Vietnam Cross of Gallantry with palm. 3rd Dental Battalion headquarters relocated from Camp Kinser to Camp Foster in April 1992.

== See also ==
- List of United States Marine Corps battalions
- Organization of the United States Marine Corps
