= 12th Marine Littoral Regiment =

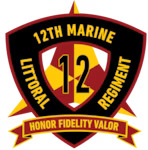
- 12th Marine Littoral Regiment Insignia
- Active: 4 October 1927 – 1945; 17 March 1952 - present
- Country: United States of America
- Branch: United States Marine Corps
- Type: Littoral Regiment
- Role: The Marine Littoral Regiment, as part of the Stand-in Force, disrupts the adversary in a contested littoral environment through reconnaissance, counter-reconnaissance, and sea denial operations in order to support the joint campaign.
- Part of: 3rd Marine Division
- Garrison/HQ: Camp Smedley Butler, Okinawa, Japan
- Nickname: The Ryukyu Regiment
- Mottos: Honor, Fidelity, Valor
- Engagements: World War II: Battle of Bougainville; Battle of Guam; Battle of Iwo Jima; Vietnam War; Operation Desert Storm; War on terror: Operation Enduring Freedom

Commanders
- Current commander: Colonel Richard P. Neikirk
- Notable commanders: Donald M. Weller; Clifford B. Drake

The 12th Marine Littoral Regiment is a Littoral regiment of the United States Marine Corps based at Camp Smedley Butler, Okinawa, Japan. Nicknamed "The Ryukyu Regiment," the regiment falls under the command of the 3rd Marine Division.

== Mission ==
The 12th Marine Littoral Regiment is a naval formation, including capabilities to enable maneuver and operations in the maritime domain. It is a stand-in force: mobile, low-signature, persistent in the contact to blunt layers, and relatively easy to maintain and sustain as part of a naval expeditionary force.

== Organization ==
- Headquarters Company, 12th MLR, at Camp Smedley Butler
- Communications Company, 12th MLR, at Camp Smedley Butler
- 12th Littoral Combat Team (12th LCT), at Camp Hansen
- 12th Littoral Anti-Air Battalion (12th LAAB), at Camp Hansen
- 12th Littoral Logistics Battalion (12th LLB), at Camp Hansen

== History ==
The Regiment was activated on October 4, 1927, at Tientsin, China and assigned to the 3rd Marine Brigade.

=== World War II ===
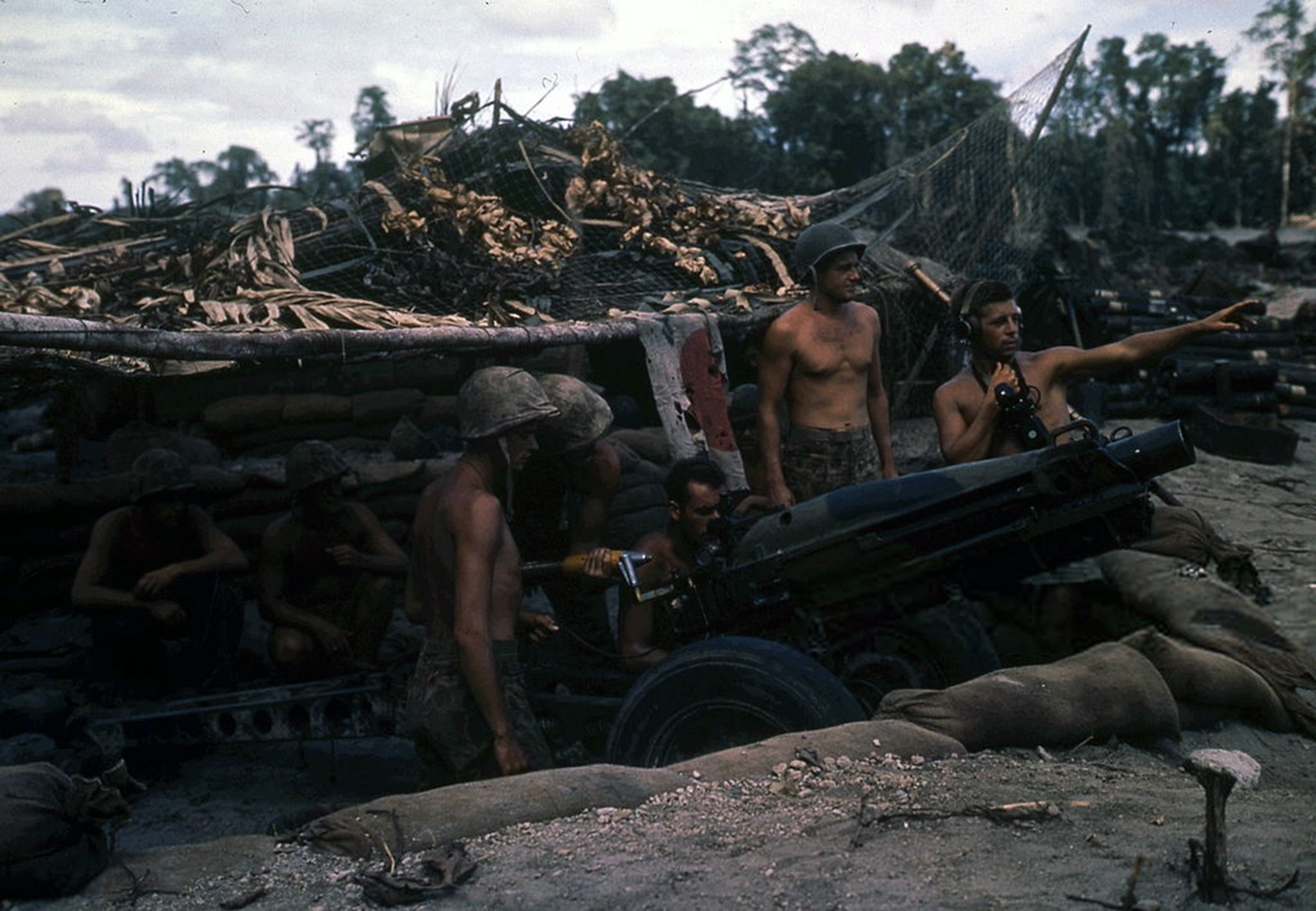
A 75 mm pack howitzer of the 12th Marines, in a semi-fortified firing position on Bougainville late in 1943.

The regiment was reactivated September 1, 1942, at San Diego, California, as the 12th Marines and assigned to the 3rd Marine Division. It relocated during October 1942 to Camp Dunlap, California. From there it deployed during March 1943 to Auckland, New Zealand. In July 1943 it moved to Guadalcanal.

The regiment participated in the following World War II campaigns:

- Bougainville campaign (1944–45)
- Northern Solomons
- Battle of Guam
- Battle of Iwo Jima

Following the war, the 12th Marines relocated in December 1945 to Marine Corps Base Camp Pendleton, California.

=== Post World War II history ===
The Regiment was reactivated on 17 March 1952, at Camp Pendleton, California, and assigned to the 3rd Marine Division. Deployed during August 1953 to Camp McNair, Japan. Redeployed during February 1956 to Okinawa. Redeployed from March–July 1965 to the Republic of Vietnam (South Vietnam).

The Regiment participated in the War in Vietnam, May 1965 – November 1969, operating from:

- Da Nang
- Phu Bai
- Chu Lai
- Huế
- Đông Hà

Redeployed from August–November 1969 to Camp Hansen, Okinawa.

Relocated during August 1971 to Camp Hauge, Okinawa. Elements participated in the Southeast Asia Evacuations, April–June 1975. Elements participated in the recovery of the SS Mayaguez in May 1975. Relocated during August 1976 to Camp Zukeran, Okinawa. Camp Zukeran renamed Camp Foster during March 1980.

Elements participated in the Operation Desert Shield and Operation Desert Storm, Southwest Asia, September 1990-April 1991. Relocated during July 1998 to Camp Hansen, Okinawa.

=== Global war on terror ===
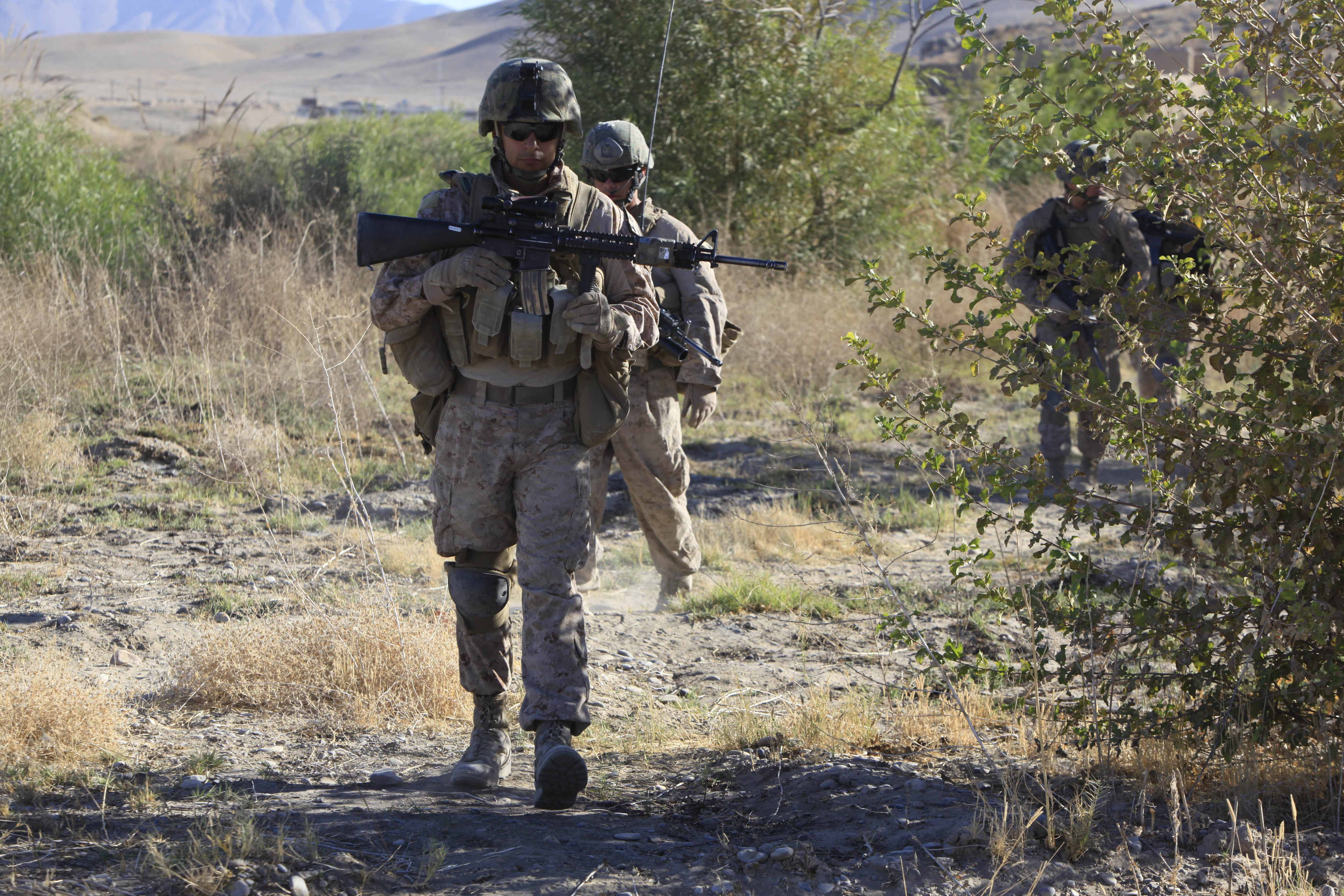
3d Bn, 12th Marines patrol in Kajaki District

=== Operation Enduring Freedom ===
Operation Enduring Freedom (OEF) was the official name used by the U.S. government for both the first stage (2001–2014) of the War in Afghanistan (2001–2021) and the larger-scale global war on terrorism. Marines from the battalion took part in the Helmand Province Campaign, particularly the Battle of Sangin.

=== Littoral Regiment ===
The regiment was redesignated as the 12th Marine Littoral Regiment on 15 November 2023, during a ceremony at Camp Hansen, Okinawa, Japan.

== See also ==
- History of the United States Marine Corps
- List of United States Marine Corps regiments
