= 3rd Intelligence Battalion =

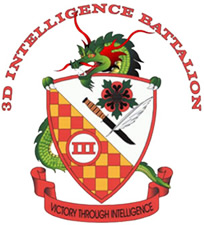
- 3rd Intel's insignia
- Active: • 3d Intelligence Company, 3d Surveillance, Reconnaissance, Intelligence Group (1 October 1990 – 2 April 1999 • 3rd Intelligence Battalion (since 2 April 1999)
- Country: United States
- Allegiance: United States of America
- Branch: United States Marine Corps
- Role: Military intelligence
- Size: 200+ Marines
- Part of: III Marine Expeditionary Force
- Garrison/HQ: Camp Hansen; Okinawa, Japan
- Motto: "Victory through intelligence"

Commanders
- Current commander: LtCol Howe
- Current Sergeant Major: SgtMaj Steven Toth

The 3rd Intelligence Battalion (3rd Intel) is a Marine Corps Intelligence military intelligence and counterintelligence unit based at Marine Corps Base Camp Hansen, Okinawa, Japan. It provides the III Marine Expeditionary Force (III MEF) with intelligence products and analysis.

== Mission ==
The battalion's mission is to plan and direct, collect, process, produce and disseminate intelligence, and provide counterintelligence support to the III MEF command element, the MEF major subordinate commands, subordinate Marine Air-Ground Task Forces (MAGTF), and other commands as directed.

== History ==
The battalion was activated on 1 October 1990 at Marine Corps Camp Courtney, Okinawa, as the 3d Intelligence Company, 3d Surveillance, Reconnaissance, Intelligence Group under the command of the III MEF. In December 1990, it was relocated to Camp Hansen. During June 1995, it was reassigned to Headquarters and Service Battalion at the III MEF.

The battalion was designated as the 3rd Intelligence Battalion on 2 April 1999. In October 1999, it was reassigned to the III MEF Headquarters group. It has participated in various operations and exercises throughout the Pacific region during the course of its history.

The battalion occasionally sends detachments in support of combat operations. In May 2009, it sent a detachment to Operation Enduring Freedom (ongoing since October 2007) under the 2nd Marine Expeditionary Brigade. The battalion's detachment arrived on Camp Bastion in South Helmand Province, Afghanistan, on 19 May 2009. Its detachment provided critical intelligence leading up to and during Operation Khanjar (2 July 2009 – 20 August 2009), Operation Cobra's Anger (4 December 2009 – 7 December 2009), and Operation Moshtarak (13 February 2010 – 7 December 2010). The Marines from the battalion's detachment returned home to Okinawa on 12 March 2010.

== Subordinate units ==
- Headquarters Company
- Intelligence Operations Company
- Counter Intelligence/Human Intelligence Company
- Battlespace Surveillance Company

== See also ==
- List of United States Marine Corps battalions
