= List of United States Marine Corps regiments =

This is a list of United States Marine Corps regiments, sorted by status and number, with the current or most-recent type and division. Some of the inactive regiments are succeeded by active battalions.

== Active ==

=== 1st Marine Division ===
Unit Name	Insignia	Nickname
1st Marine Regiment		First of the First
5th Marine Regiment		The Fighting Fifth
7th Marine Regiment		Magnificent Seventh
11th Marine Regiment		The Cannon Cockers

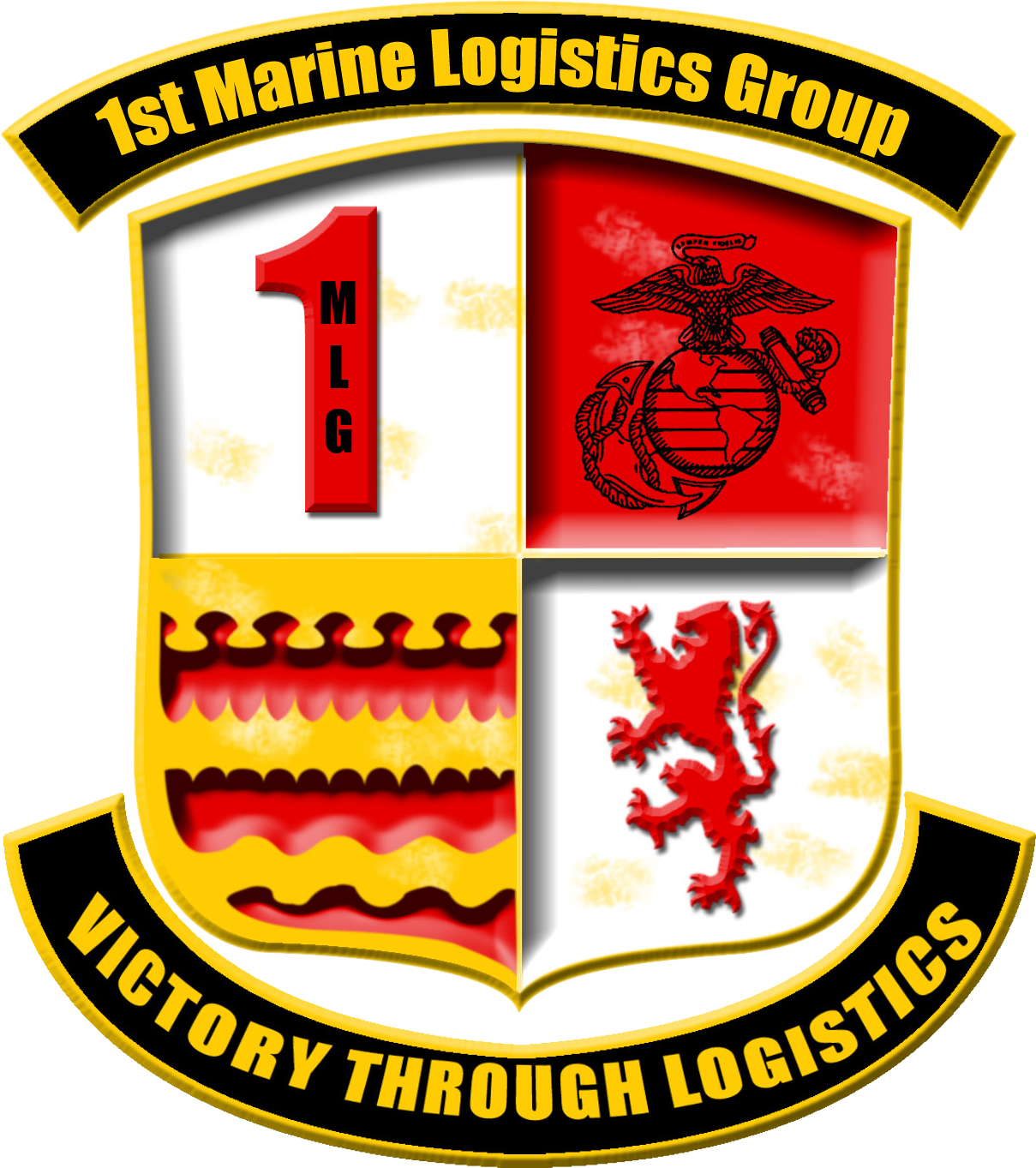

=== 1st Marine Logistics Group ===
Unit Name	Insignia	Nickname
Combat Logistics Regiment 1		N/A
Headquarters Regiment, 1st Marine Logistics Group		N/A

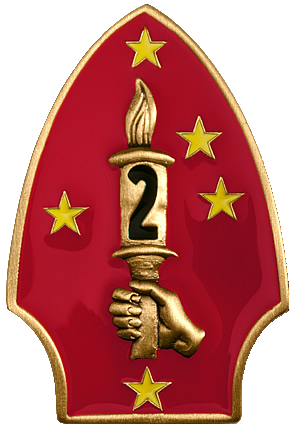

=== 2nd Marine Division ===
Unit Name	Insignia	Nickname
2nd Marine Regiment		Tarawa
6th Marine Regiment		The Fighting Sixth
10th Marine Regiment		Arm of Decision

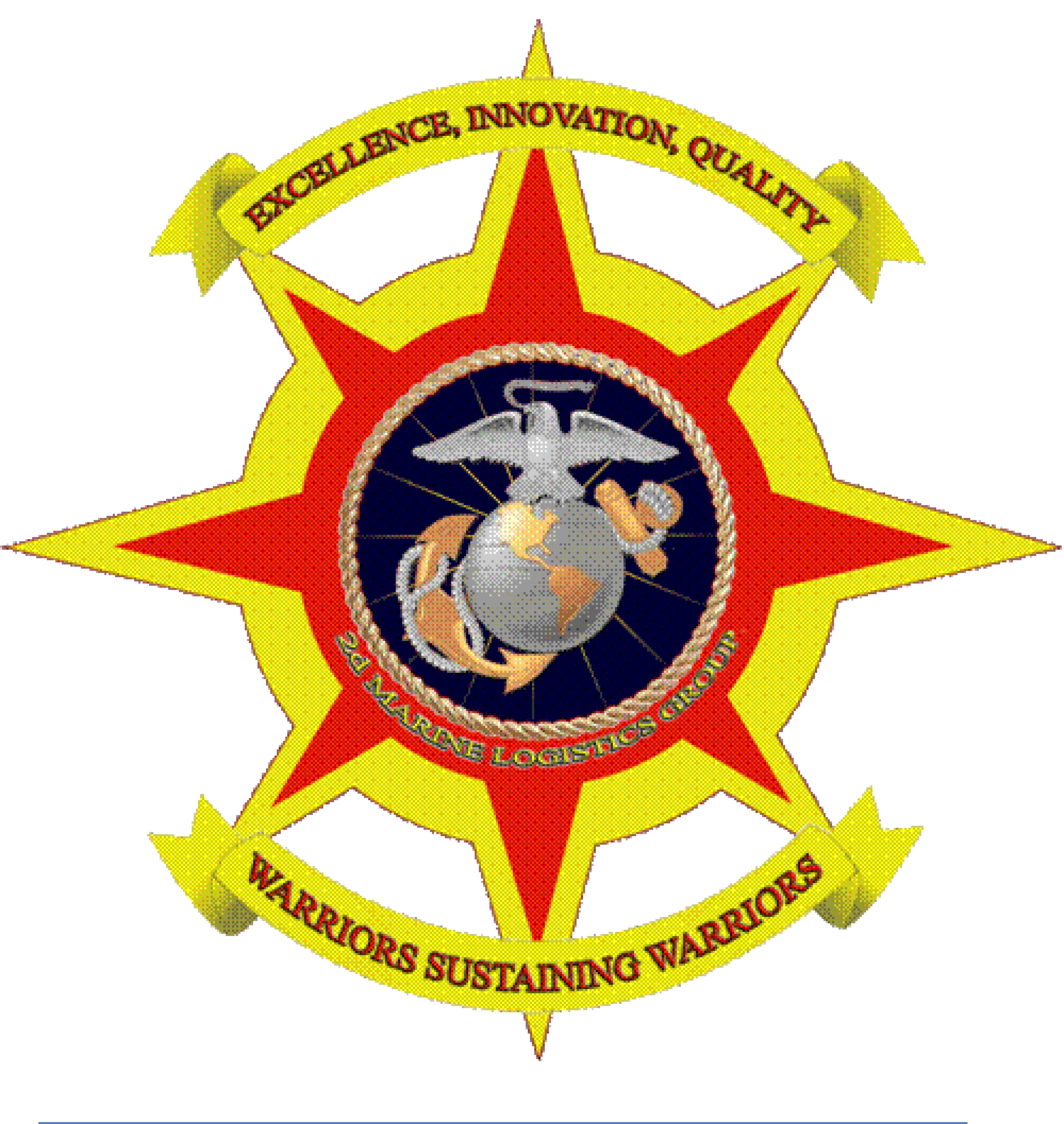

=== 2nd Marine Logistics Group ===
Unit Name	Insignia	Nickname
Combat Logistics Regiment 2		N/A
Combat Logistics Regiment 27		N/A

=== 3rd Marine Division ===
Unit Name	Insignia	Nickname
3rd Marine Littoral Regiment		N/A
4th Marine Regiment		China Marines
12th Marine Littoral Regiment		Thunder & Steel

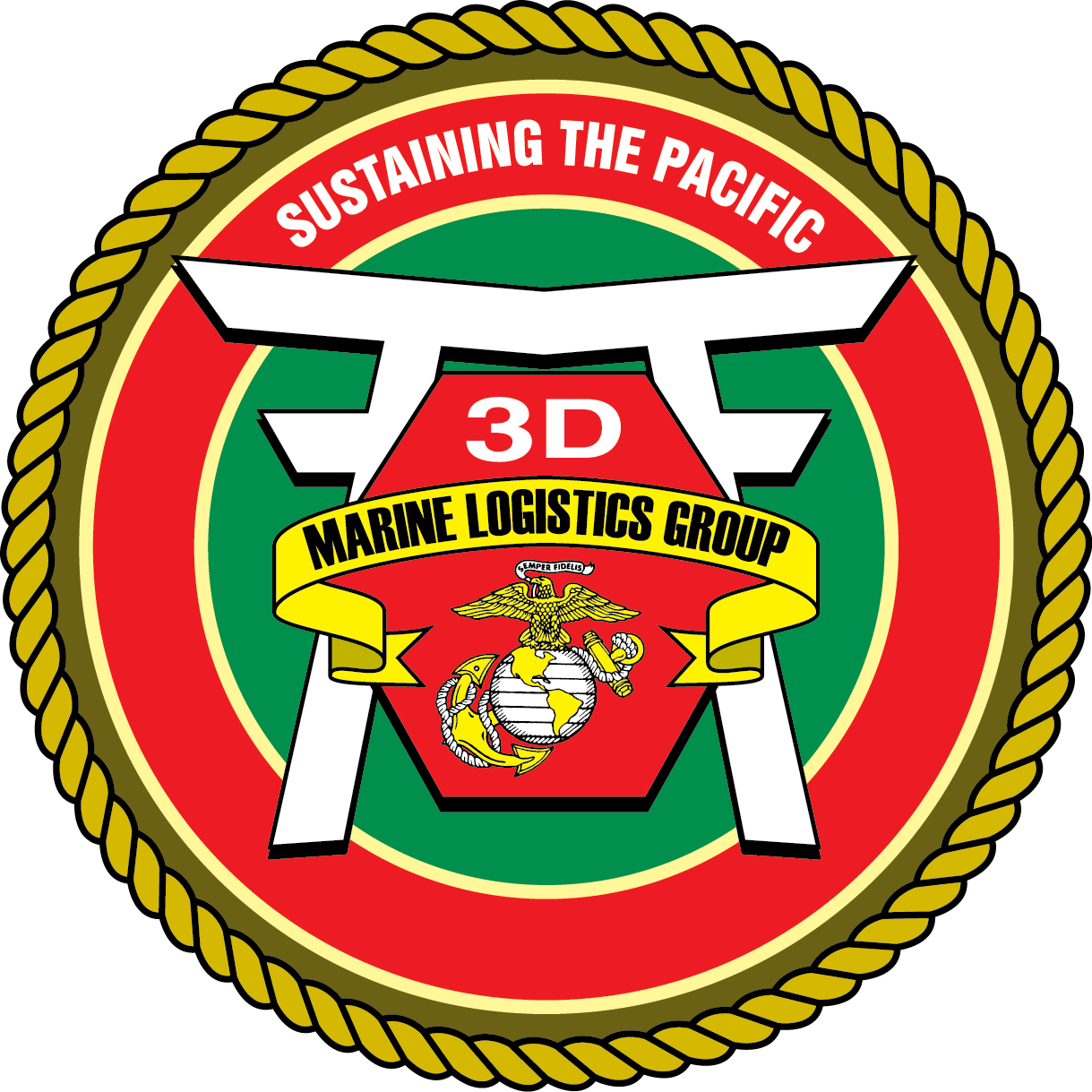

=== 3rd Marine Logistics Group ===
Unit Name	Insignia	Nickname
Combat Logistics Regiment 3		N/A
Headquarters Regiment, 3rd Marine Logistics Group		N/A

=== 4th Marine Division (Reserve) ===
Unit Name	Insignia	Nickname
14th Marine Regiment		N/A
23rd Marine Regiment		N/A
25th Marine Regiment		Cold Steel

=== 4th Marine Logistics Group ===
Unit Name	Insignia	Nickname
Combat Logistics Regiment 4		N/A
Combat Logistics Regiment 45		N/A

=== Other regiments ===
Unit Name	Insignia	Nickname
Recruit Training Regiments		
Marine Corps Security Force Regiment		Gunslingers
Marine Raider Regiment		
USMC Wounded Warrior Regiment		

=== List of active regiments by type and number ===
==== Infantry ====
- 1st Marine Regiment
- 2nd Marine Regiment
- 4th Marine Regiment
- 5th Marine Regiment
- 6th Marine Regiment
- 7th Marine Regiment
- 23rd Marine Regiment
- 25th Marine Regiment

==== Artillery ====
- 10th Marine Regiment
- 11th Marine Regiment
- 14th Marine Regiment

==== Littoral ====
- 3rd Marine Littoral Regiment
- 12th Marine Littoral Regiment

==== Logistics ====
- Combat Logistics Regiment 1
- Combat Logistics Regiment 2
- Combat Logistics Regiment 3
- Combat Logistics Regiment 4
- Combat Logistics Regiment 17
- Combat Logistics Regiment 27
- Combat Logistics Regiment 37
- Combat Logistics Regiment 45

==== Other ====
- Marine Corps Security Force Regiment
- Marine Raider Regiment
- Recruit Training Regiment, MCRD Parris Island, SC
- Recruit Training Regiment, MCRD San Diego, CA
- Wounded Warrior Regiment

== Inactive ==
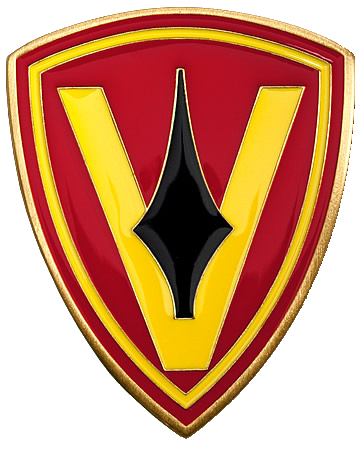

=== 5th Marine Division ===
Unit Name	Insignia	Nickname
13th Marine Regiment		
26th Marine Regiment		The Professionals
27th Marine Regiment		
28th Marine Regiment		Uncommon Valor

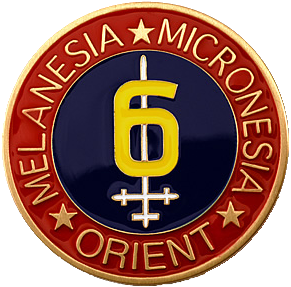

=== 6th Marine Division ===
Unit Name	Insignia	Nickname
15th Marine Regiment		
22nd Marine Regiment		
29th Marine Regiment		

=== Other decommissioned regiments ===
Unit Name	Insignia	Nickname
1st Marine Parachute Regiment		Paramarines
8th Marine Regiment		More Than Duty
9th Marine Regiment		Striking Ninth
16th Marine Regiment		
17th Marine Regiment		
18th Marine Regiment		
19th Marine Regiment		
20th Marine Regiment		
21st Marine Regiment		
24th Marine Regiment		N/A
Combat Logistics Regiment 15		N/A
Combat Logistics Regiment 25		N/A
Combat Logistics Regiment 35		N/A

== See also ==
- List of United States Marine Corps aircraft groups
