= 3rd Marine Logistics Group =

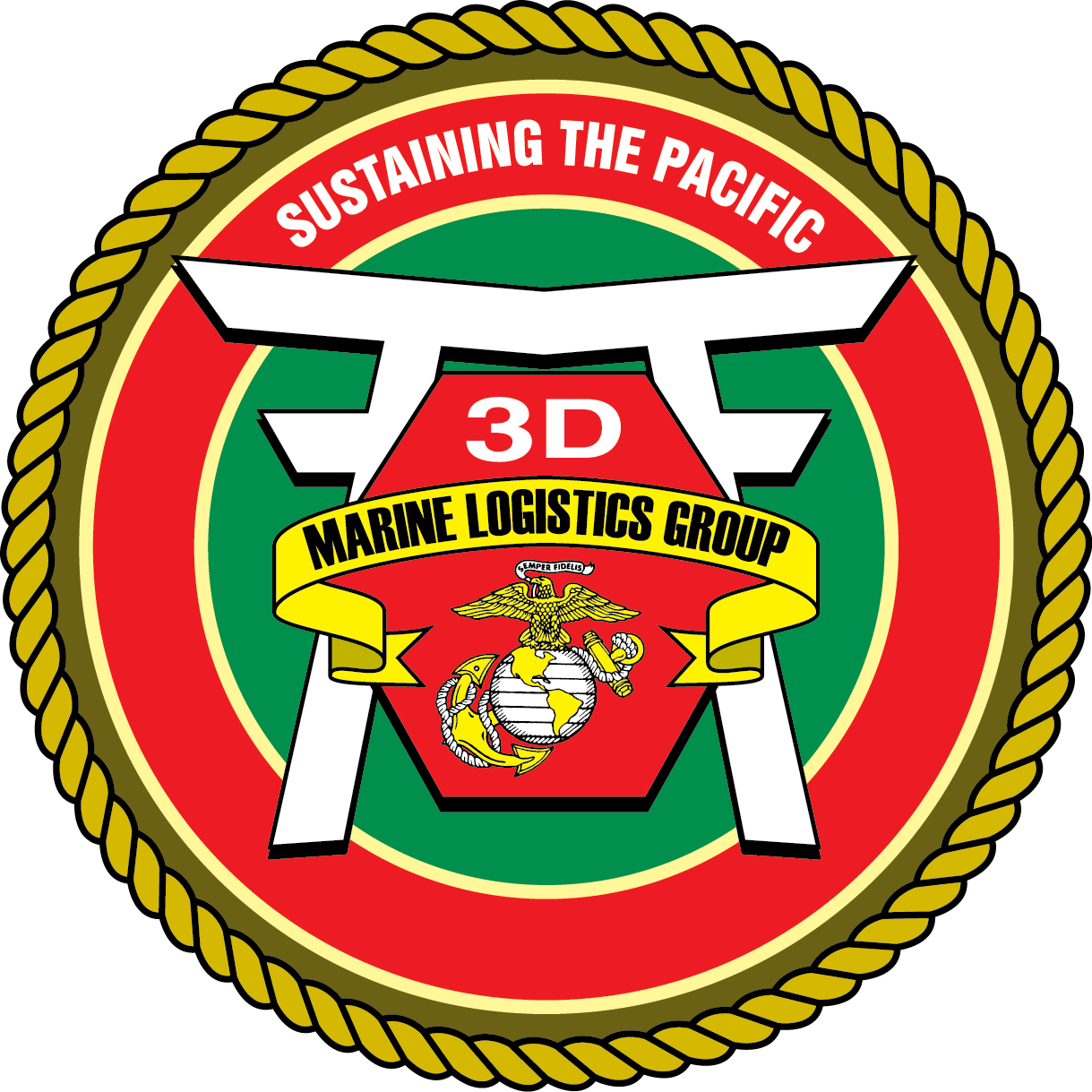
- 3rd Marine Logistics Group Insignia
- Active: 1 May 1958 – present
- Country: United States
- Allegiance: United States of America
- Branch: United States Marine Corps
- Type: Logistics
- Role: Multi-Function Combat Service Support
- Part of: III Marine Expeditionary Force
- Garrison/HQ: Camp Smedley Butler, Okinawa, Japan
- Motto: Sustaining the Pacific
- Engagements: Vietnam War; Operation Desert Storm; Operation Enduring Freedom

Commanders
- Commanding General: Brigadier General Kevin G. Collins
- Sergeant Major: Sergeant Major Marco A. Cordero
- Command Master Chief: CMDCM Nathan K. Chun
- Notable commanders: BGen Carrol A. Mutter (1992–1994)

The 3rd Marine Logistics Group (3rd MLG) is the Logistics Combat Element (LCE) for III Marine Expeditionary Force currently headquartered on Camp Kinser, Marine Corps Base Smedley D. Butler, Okinawa, Japan. 3rd MLG provides combat service support (CSS) to III MEF units above the organic capability. CSS is the essential capabilities, functions, activities, and tasks necessary to sustain all elements of operating forces in theater at all levels of war. Combat service support includes, but is not limited, to supply, maintenance, transportation, general engineering, health services, and other services required by aviation and ground combat forces to permit those units to accomplish their missions.

== Mission ==
As a multi-function Combat Service Support Group, enable III Marine Expeditionary Force (III MEF) by providing CSS, conducting intermediate level supply, field level maintenance, material distribution, equipment fielding, and procurement management to support deployed Marine air-ground task forces (MAGTFs) in order to enhance and preserve the expeditionary nature and combat power of III MEF.

== History ==
=== 3rd Force Service Regiment (3rd FSR) ===
3d MLG was originally activated on Camp Courtney, Okinawa, Japan as the 3d Force Service Regiment on 1 May 1958 under the 3d Marine Division (MARDIV). During November 1961, the Regiment was relocated to Camp Sukiran, Okinawa, Japan. In August 1965, 3d FSR was officially detached from 3d MARDIV and placed under operational control of Commanding General, Fleet Marine Forces, Pacific. From 1965 through 1966, elements of 3d FSR were deployed to support the war in Vietnam. Throughout most of 1965, a Force Logistic Support Group in Da Nang, which was subordinate to 3d FSR provided logistical support for approximately 38,000 Marines of the 3d Marine Division and 1st Marine Air Wing. Because of the deterioration of equipment in South Vietnam, the Commanding General Fleet Marine Forces Pacific was granted authority to conduct fifth echelon maintenance and rebuild equipment in the western Pacific. From 1966 to 1970, 3d FSR was granted funds and provided guidance to conduct fifth echelon maintenance within its capabilities and contract out the remainder instead of returning equipment to the United States which proved to be one of the great logistical decisions of Vietnam. On 29 December 1966, Camp Sukiran, where 3d FSR was located, was re-dedicated as Camp Foster.

=== 3rd Force Service Support Group (3rd FSSG) ===
On 6 March 1976, the 3rd Force Service Support Regiment was re-designated 3rd Force Service Support Group (3d FSSG) as part of the implementation of new doctrine, organization and structure for combat service support in the Marine Corps. Upon transition, the command consisted of Headquarters and Service Battalion, Maintenance Battalion, Support Battalion, Motor Transport Battalion, Medical Battalion, Engineer Support Battalion, and four dental companies. The command later consisted of Headquarters and Service Battalion, 3rd Materiel Readiness Battalion, headquartered at Camp Kinser; 3rd Dental Battalion and 3rd Transportation Support Battalion located at Camp Foster; 3rd Medical Battalion, 9th Engineer Support Battalion at Camp Hansen, Electronics Maintenance Company (ELMACO) located at Camp Kinser, with a detachment platoon at Camp Hansen; Combat Service Support Detachment 76 located at Camp Fuji, Japan; Combat Service Support Detachment 36 located at Marine Corps Air Station Iwakuni, Japan; and Combat Service Support Group 3, located at Marine Corps Base Hawaii. During October 1978, 3d FSSG was relocated to the Makiminato Service Area, Okinawa which was later rededicated as Camp Kinser on 21 January 1980.

==== Operation Provide Comfort ====
After the decision on 5 April 1991 to commit American resources to assist in humanitarian operations in Iraq in the aftermath of Operations Desert Shield and Desert Storm, a contingency Marine air-ground task force (MAGTF) was created using forces from the 3d Force Service Support Group. Designated as Contingency MAGTF 1-91, the command element came from 3d FSSG with the subordinate ground combat element coming from 3d Marine Division, the aviation combat element came from 1st Marine Aircraft Wing, and the combat service support element came from 3d FSSG's own Company B, 3d Landing Support Battalion. Company B was further reinforced by service support detachments from 3d Supply Battalion, two dumpsite sections and repair personnel from 3d Maintenance Battalion, administrative personnel from Headquarters and Service Battalion, and a detachment from 9th Engineer Support Battalion. CMAGTF 1-91 was deployed on 6 May 1991.

==== Operation Unified Assistance ====
In early-January 2005, elements of 3d FSSG rapidly deployed to Sri Lanka and Indonesia to support Operation Unified Assistance, the tsunami relief efforts.

==== Pakistan Earthquake Relief ====
This was followed up with a deployment to Pakistan to aid in the relief efforts after the 2005 Kashmir 7.6-magnitude earthquake that shook the North West Frontier Province of Pakistan on 8 October 2005, leaving almost 100,000 dead and nearly 3 million Pakistanis homeless. As the Pakistanis braced for the impending annual Himalayan winter, III Marine Expeditionary Force deployed elements (approx. 240 Marines and Sailors) of 3d FSSG to form a humanitarian relief team, later named Combined Medical Relief Team-3 (CMRT-3) in support of Operation LIFELINE, Pakistan. CMRT-3 set up a surgical hospital at the foothills of the Himalayan mountains of Pakistan and worked side by side with Pakistani military forces, NGOs, governmental agencies, and the UN to help save lives and assist in the recovery efforts. More than 15,000 Pakistanis were treated and over 6.5 million pounds of relief supplies were provided through 7 March 2006 when CMRT-3 redeployed back to Okinawa, Japan.

=== 3d Marine Logistics Group (3d MLG) ===
On 28 October 2005, the 3rd Force Service Support Group was officially re-designated the 3d Marine Logistics Group. The new designation is meant to signify enhanced logistical support capabilities across the MAGTF by creating units that maintain working relationships with 3d Marine Division and 4th Marine Regiment and are currently task organized to deploy.

== Organization ==
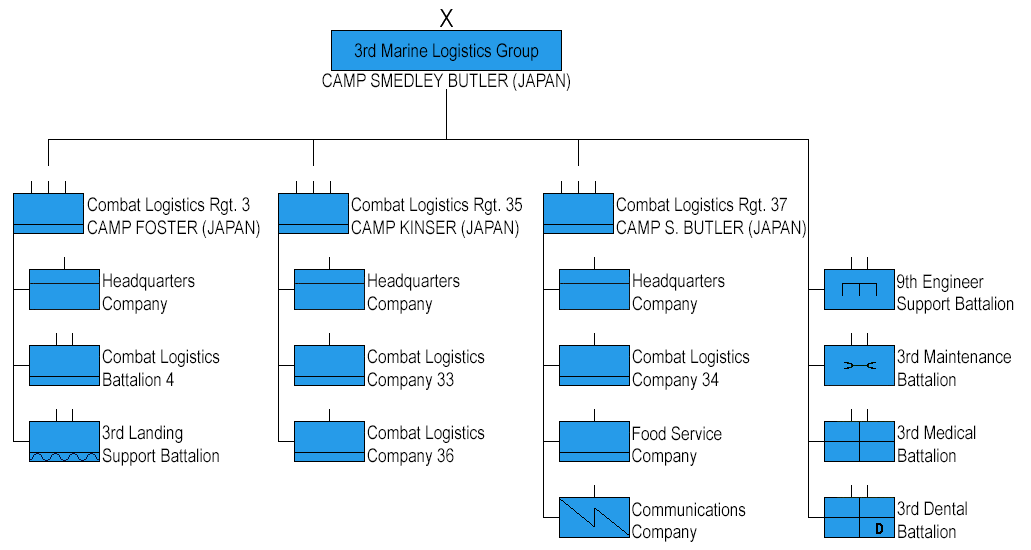
3rd Marine Logistics Group organization as of May 2026 (click to enlarge)

As of May 2026 the 3rd Marine Logistics Group consists of:

- 3rd Marine Logistics Group
  - Combat Logistics Regiment 3
  - Combat Logistics Regiment 35
  - Combat Logistics Regiment 37
  - 3rd Maintenance Battalion
  - 3rd Medical Battalion
  - 3rd Dental Battalion
  - 9th Engineer Support Battalion
