= 3rd Supply Battalion =

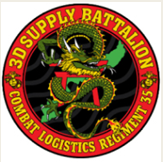
- 3rd Supply Battalion insignia
- Country: United States
- Branch: USMC
- Part of: 3rd Marine Logistics Group
- Garrison/HQ: Camp Kinser
- Mascot: Dragon

Commanders
- Current commander: LtCol Robert Wolfe

The 3rd Supply Battalion is a battalion of the United States Marine Corps that specializes in distributing and warehousing military goods and equipment. They are headquartered at Camp Kinser, with their most remote company of Marines, Ammunition Company, located 37 miles north of Camp Kinser aboard Camp Schwab near the town of Henoko, Okinawa, Japan and fall under the command of the 3rd Marine Logistics Group.

== Subordinate units ==
- Headquarters and Service Company
- Ammunition Company
- Medical Logistics Company
- Supply Company
- Combat Logistics Company 36
