= 3rd Maintenance Battalion =

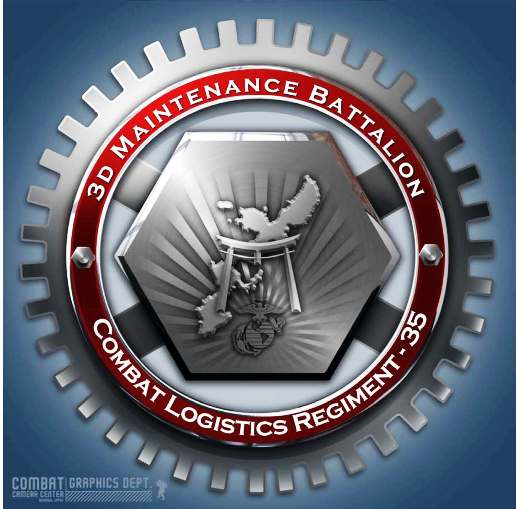
- 3rd Maintenance Battalion insignia
- Country: United States
- Branch: USMC
- Role: Combat service support
- Part of: 3rd Sustainment Group (Experimental); 3rd Marine Logistics Group
- Garrison/HQ: Camp Kinser, Okinawa, Japan
- Nickname: Sledgehammer

The 3rd Maintenance Battalion is a battalion of the United States Marine Corps that provides intermediate-level maintenance for the III Marine Expeditionary Force's tactical ordnance, engineer, motor transport, communications electronics and general support ground equipment. The unit falls under the command of 3rd Sustainment Group (Experimental) and the 3rd Marine Logistics Group, and is based at Camp Kinser, Okinawa, Japan, with the exception of Regional Maintenance Operations Companies, which are located at nearby Camp Foster and Camp Hansen, respectively.

== Subordinate units ==
- Headquarters And Service Company (HSC)
- Intermediate Repair Company (IRC)
- Regional Maintenance Operations Company North (RMOC-N)
- Regional Maintenance Operations Company South (RMOC-S)

== Mission ==
To provide direct and general support, intermediate (second through fourth echelon) maintenance support for Marine Corps furnished tactical ordnance, engineer, motor, communications-electronics and general support equipment of III MEF. To provide reparable support to include stock, store, and fiscal accounting for normal accounting for normal and low-density reparables.

== History ==
1958–1961

- Activated 1 May 1958 at Camp Courtney, Okinawa, as Maintenance Company, 3D Force Service Regiment, 3D Marine Division, Fleet Marine Force.
- Redesignated 10 September 1959 as Material Supply and Maintenance Battalion, 3D Force Service Regiment, Fleet Marine Force.
- Relocated during March 1961 to Camp Sukiran, Okinawa.

1962–1972

- Redesignated 1 September 1964 as Maintenance Battalion, 3D Force Service Regiment, Fleet Marine Force.
- 3D Force Service Regiment detached during August 1965 from the 3D Marine Division and placed under the operational control of Fleet Marine Force, Pacific.
- Elements of Maintenance Battalion participated in the war in Vietnam at various times, 1965–1972.

1973–1998

- Redesignated 6 March 1976 as the 3D Maintenance Battalion, 3D Force Service Support Group, Fleet Marine Force, Pacific.
- Relocated during October 1978 to Makiminato Service Area, Okinawa.
- Camp Makiminato Rededicated during January 1980 as Camp Kinser which is where 3D Maintenance Battalion is currently located.
- Participated in support of various contingency and humanitarian relief operations during the 1990s.

1999 – present

== See also ==
- History of the United States Marine Corps
- List of United States Marine Corps battalions
