= Combat Logistics Battalion 12 =

12th Littoral Logistics Battalion
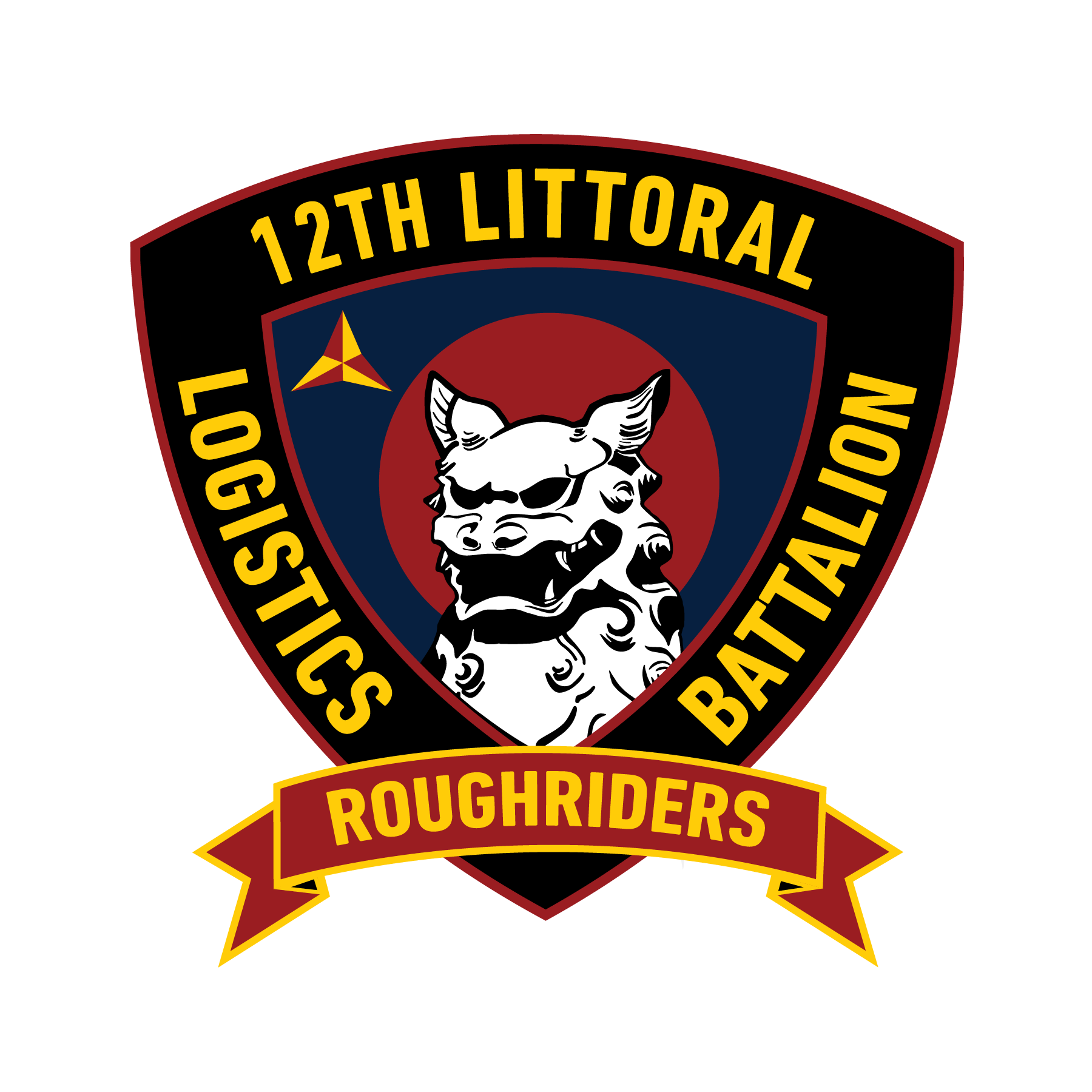
- 12th Littoral Logistics Battalion Insignia
- Active: 25 Jun 1953 - 14 Oct 1993 1 Oct 2014 - present
- Country: United States of America
- Branch: United States Marine Corps
- Type: Littoral Logistics
- Role: Provide tactical-level logistics and area support to expeditionary advanced bases
- Part of: 12th Marine Littoral Regiment
- Garrison/HQ: Camp Hansen, Okinawa, Japan
- Nickname(s): Roughriders
- Motto(s): Earn Your Seat
- Engagements: Vietnam War, Operation Fiery Vigil

Commanders
- Current commander: Lieutenant Colonel Matthew S. Kendrick

12th Littoral Logistics Battalion (12th LLB), formerly known as Combat Logistics Battalion 12 and previously 9th Motor Transport Battalion, 3d Transportation Support Battalion, and 3d Transportation Battalion, is a multi-functional logistics unit of the United States Marine Corps and is headquartered at Camp Hansen, Okinawa, Japan. The unit falls under the command of 12th Marine Littoral Regiment, 3d Marine Division.

== Mission ==
12th Littoral Logistics Battalion provides tactical-level logistics to the 12th Marine Littoral Regiment and area support to expeditionary advanced bases to enable Fleet Marine Force, bilateral, and joint operations across the competition continuum.

== Subordinate units ==
- Headquarters Company
- Littoral Logistics Company A
- Littoral Logistics Company B
- General Support Company

== History ==
9th Motor Transport Battalion was activated at Marine Corps Base Camp Pendleton, California on June 25, 1953. It was relocated to Camp Sukiran, Okinawa in November 1958 as part of 3d Marine Division. In December 1961, it relocated to Camp Hansen, Okinawa.

Vietnam

In July 1965, the battalion deployed to Da Nang, Republic of Vietnam and participated in combat operations from July 1965 to November 1969. It operated from Da Nang, Dong Ha, and Quang Tri and was awarded the Presidential Unit Citation, Vietnam Service Streamer with Two Silver and One Bronze Stars, Vietnam Cross of Gallantry with Palm Streamer, and Vietnam Meritorious Unit Citation Civil Actions Streamer for its service. In November 1969, the battalion redeployed to Camp Hansen, Okinawa. In April 1975, elements of the battalion participated in the Southeast Asia evacuations.

Post-Vietnam through Cold War

In April 1976, the battalion was reassigned to the 3d Force Service Support Group, Fleet Marine Force, Pacific and moved to Camp Foster in November 1978. From May to July 1991, elements of the battalion participated in Operation Fiery Vigil. On 14 October 1993, the battalion was deactivated as part of the post-Cold War reduction in force. From 1978 to 1991, the battalion earned two Navy Unit Commendations and two Meritorious Unit Commendations.

Reactivation

On 1 October 2014, the battalion was reactivated at Camp Foster, Okinawa as 3d Transportation Support Battalion, Combat Logistics Regiment 3, 3d Marine Logistics Group, and inherited the lineage and honors of 9th Motor Transport Battalion. During this period, the battalion was awarded the Global War on Terror Service Streamer. On 23 March 2021, the battalion was redesignated as 3d Transportation Battalion. As part of the Force Design 2030 modernization, the battalion redesignated and reorganized as Combat Logistics Battalion 12 on 30 August 2023 and relocated back to Camp Hansen in June 2024. On 3 October 2024, the battalion redesignated as 12th Littoral Logistics Battalion and assigned to 12th Marine Littoral Regiment, 3d Marine Division.

During its history, the battalion has been awarded the National Defense Service Streamer four times.

== Honors ==
Presidential Unit Citation Streamer

Navy Unit Commendation Streamer with One Bronze Star

Meritorious Unit Commendation Streamer with One Bronze Star

National Defense Service Streamer with Three Bronze Stars

Vietnam Service Streamer with Two Silver and One Bronze Stars

Vietnam Cross of Gallantry with Palm Streamer

Global War on Terrorism Service Streamer

Vietnam Meritorious Unit Citation Civil Actions Streamer

== Previous Unit Logos ==
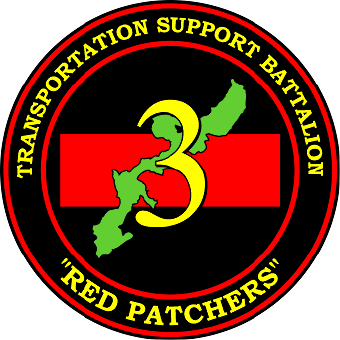

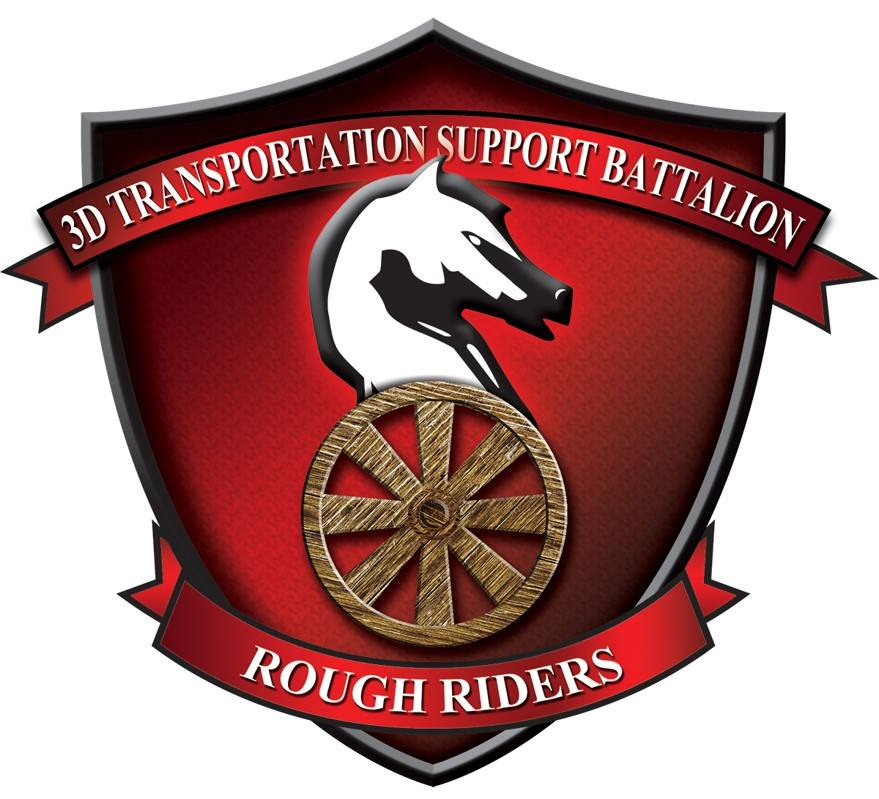

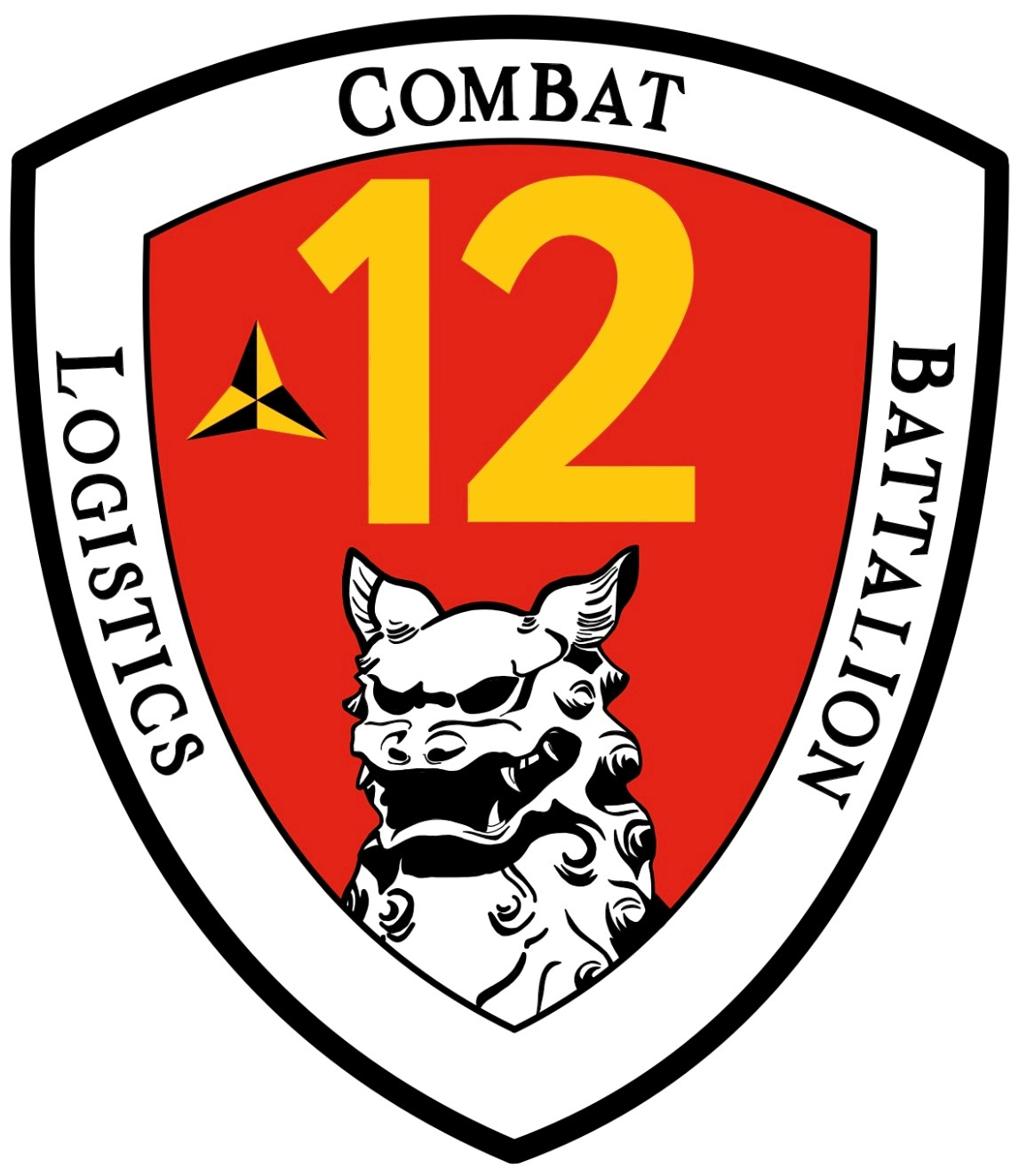

== See also ==
- List of United States Marine Corps battalions
- Organization of the United States Marine Corps
