= Okinawa Marine =

The Okinawa Marine
- Type: Weekly newspaper
- Publisher: Marine Corps Community Services
- Headquarters: Public Affairs Office, H&S BN MCB PAO, Unit 35002; FPO AP 96373-5002

The Okinawa Marine was the weekly publication produced by the United States Marine Corps public affairs office headquartered at Camp Butler, Okinawa Prefecture, Japan and distributed free to all military bases in Okinawa. It provided information on U.S. facilities and activities in and around Okinawa Island. The newspaper included area guide, living information, weather, and public affairs. The final edition was published on Feb 28, 2014.
