= 3rd Medical Battalion =

3d Medical Battalion
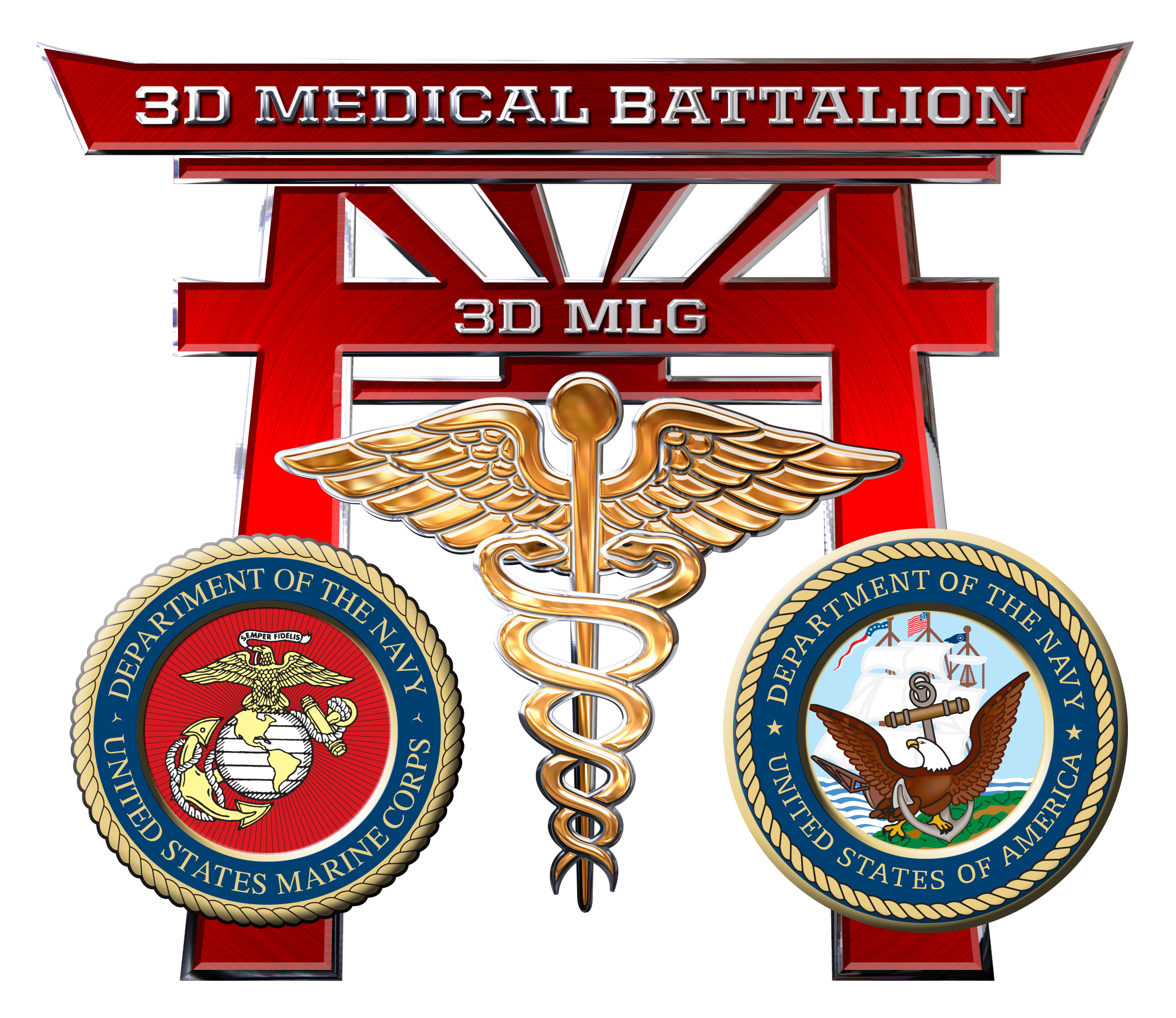
- 3d Medical Battalion insignia
- Active: N/A
- Country: United States
- Branch: USMC
- Type: Logistics
- Role: Medical Support
- Size: Battalion
- Part of: 3d Marine Logistics Group
- Garrison/HQ: Camp Foster, Okinawa, Japan
- Engagements: World War II; Vietnam War; Operation Enduring Freedom; Operation Iraqi Freedom

Commanders
- Current commander: Captain

The 3d Medical Battalion (3D MED BN) is a medical support unit of the United States Marine Corps and is headquartered at Camp Foster, Okinawa, Japan. The unit falls under the command of 3rd Marine Logistics Group.

== Current units ==
- Headquarters and Service Company
- Alpha Company
- Bravo Company (MCB Hawaii)

== Mission ==
To provide direct and general Health Service Support to III MEF in order to sustain the combat effort across the full spectrum of MAGTF operations.

== History ==
=== Lineage ===
1942-1945 3D Medical Battalion was activated 12 August 1942 at San Diego, California, as the 3D Medical Battalion and assigned to the 2D Marine Division. In September 1942 reassigned to the 3D Marine Division. Deployed during February–March 1943 to Auckland, New Zealand. Redeployed during March–April 1945 to Guam. The unit was deactivated 1 December 1945.

1952-2009 3D Medical Battalion was reactivated 5 March 1952 at Camp Pendleton, California, and assigned to the 3D Marine Division as before. Deployed during August 1953 to Camp Gifu, Japan. Redeployed during March 1956 to Camp Hauge, Okinawa. Redeployed during June 1965 to Da Nang, Republic of Vietnam. Re assigned during July 1979 to 3D Force Service Support Group.

During the Tsunami disaster in Sri Lanka and Indonesia, elements of 3D FSSG assisted from December 2004 - February 2005. Elements also participated in humanitarian relief efforts in Pakistan during October 2006 - March 2006.

Reassigned during July 2007 to Combat Logistics Regiment 35, 3D Marine Logistics Group.

=== World War II ===
3D Medical Battalion participated in the following WWII campaigns. Bougainville, Solomon Islands, Guam, and Iwo Jima.

=== Vietnam War ===
The battalion operated from the following locations during the war in Vietnam: Da Nang, Chu Lai, Phu Bai, Dong Ha, and Quang Tri. The unit departed South Vietnam on 24 November 1969, redeploying to Okinawa.

=== The Gulf War and the 1990s ===
In the mid-1990s, the 3rd Medical Battalion part of the 3rd Force Service Support Group (FSSG) was headquartered at Camp Hansen with H&S Co, and Bravo Company on site, Charlie Company was located on Camp Schwab. Hospital corpsmen from both Bravo and Charlie companies staffed the medical clinics and operated the ambulances providing medical support to marine forces on both camps.

Members deployed as part of the 31st MEU and participated in various operations and training in the Pacific Rim.

=== Operation Enduring Freedom and Iraqi Freedom ===
During the wars in Afghanistan and Iraq elements of 3D FSSG participated in operations from March 2004-March 2005 and March 2007-June 2008.

=== COVID-19 Pandemic ===
In April 2020, A detachment was sent to Guam to assist the outbreak aboard the USS Theodore Roosevelt. "“The rapid response by the 3rd MLG was incredible...Their footprint ashore will ensure our Sailors off ship are well cared for.” - Rear Adm. Stu Baker, commander, Carrier Strike Group Nine.

Task Force (TF) Medical's response force was made up of 90 Marines and Sailors assigned to 3rd Marine Logistics Group out of Okinawa, Japan. In total they cared for 850 COVID-19 positive service members. Lt. Cmdr. Jennifer Knapp was the officer in charge and uniquely, compared to the force makeup, all 4 program leads were female.

=== Honors awarded ===
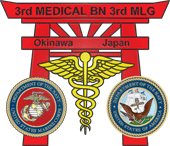
Old 3rd Medical Battalion logo.

- Presidential Unit Citation streamer. Vietnam 1965-1967
- Navy Unit Commendation streamer with four bronze stars. World War II: Iwo Jima -1945, Vietnam 1965-1966, 1968, 1980-1984, 1985-1987
- Meritorious Unit Commendation streamer with one bronze star. 1989-1991, 2004-2005
- Asiatic-Pacific Campaign streamer with four bronze stars
- World War II Victory streamer
- National Defense Service streamer with three bronze stars
- Korean Service streamer
- Vietnam Service streamer with two silver and one bronze star
- Global War on Terrorism Service streamer
- Vietnam Cross of Gallantry with Palm streamer

== See also ==
- History of the United States Marine Corps
- List of United States Marine Corps battalions
