= Combat Logistics Regiment 25 =

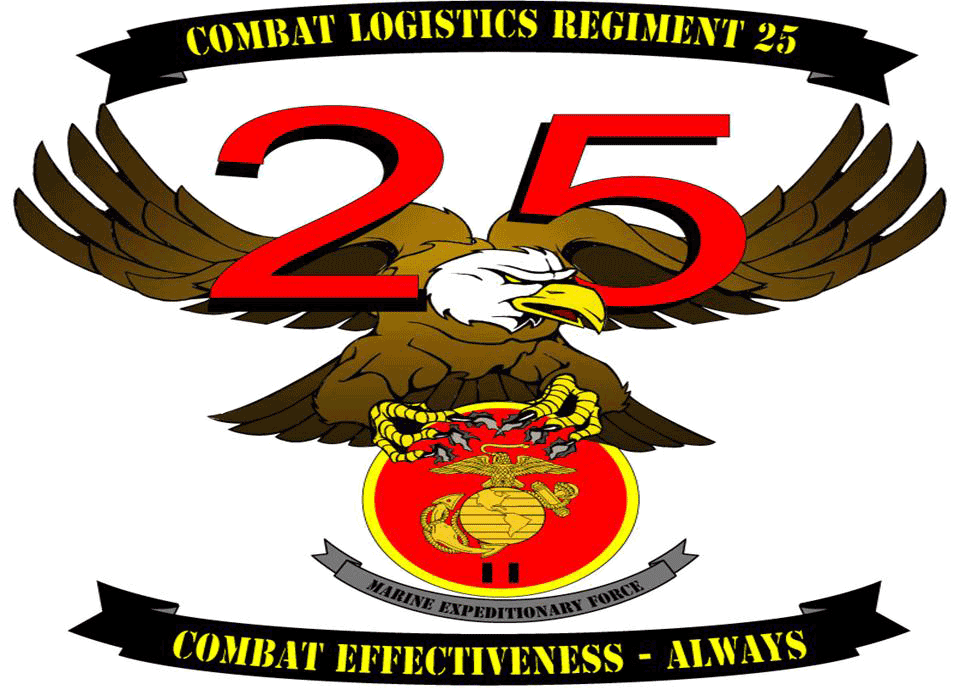
- Country: United States
- Allegiance: United States of America
- Branch: United States Marine Corps
- Type: Logistics
- Part of: 2nd Marine Logistics Group; II Marine Expeditionary Force
- Garrison/HQ: Marine Corps Base Camp Lejeune
- Motto: Combat Effectiveness - Always
- Engagements: Operation Iraqi Freedom Operation Enduring Freedom

Commanders
- Current commander: N/A

Combat Logistics Regiment 25 (CLR 25) was a logistics regiment of the United States Marine Corps. When active, the unit was based at Marine Corps Base Camp Lejeune, North Carolina and fell under the command of the 2nd Marine Logistics Group and the II Marine Expeditionary Force.

== Subordinate units ==
- 2nd Supply Battalion
- 2nd Medical Battalion
- 2nd Maintenance Battalion
- Combat Logistics Company 21
- Combat Logistics Company 23

== Mission ==
To provide general intermediate level supply, field level maintenance, material distribution, procurement management and equipment fielding support to the Marine Expeditionary Force and support to specified Marine Aircraft Wing organizations.

== History ==
Combat Logistics Regiment 25 was activated 26 May 2006 at Marine Corps Base Camp Lejeune, North Carolina. Elements of the regiment participated in Operation Iraqi Freedom from February 2007 through January 2008. Awards include the National Defense Service Streamer and Global War On Terrorism Service streamer.

As part of the on-going reorganization of the Marine Corps, the regiment was decommissioned on 1 July 2020.

== Unit awards ==
A unit citation or commendation is an award bestowed upon an organization for the action cited. Members of the unit who participated in said actions are allowed to wear on their uniforms the awarded unit citation. CLR-25 was presented with the following awards:

Streamer	Award	Year(s)	Additional Info
	National Defense Service Streamer	2006-2020	War on terrorism
	Global War on Terrorism Service Streamer	2006-2020	War on terrorism

== See also ==
- List of United States Marine Corps regiments
- Organization of the United States Marine Corps
