= 9th Engineer Support Battalion =

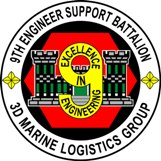
- 9th ESB
- Active: 1 November 1965 – present
- Country: United States
- Allegiance: United States of America
- Branch: United States Marine Corps
- Role: Engineering support
- Part of: 3rd Marine Logistics Group; III Marine Expeditionary Force
- Garrison/HQ: Camp Hansen, Okinawa, Japan
- Nickname: Team 9
- Motto: "Excellence in Engineering"
- Engagements: Vietnam War; Operation Enduring Freedom; Operation Iraqi Freedom

Commanders
- Current commander: LtCol Christopher A. Thrasher (June 2023 – present)

The 9th Engineer Support Battalion (9th ESB) is a general and direct engineering support unit of the United States Marine Corps and is headquartered at Camp Hansen, Okinawa, Japan. The unit is subordinate to the 3rd Marine Logistics Group and the III Marine Expeditionary Force.

== Mission ==
Provide General and Direct Engineering Support of a Deliberate Nature to the MAGTF, to include survivability, countermobility and mobility enhancements, and explosive ordnance disposal; and general supply support incident to the handling, storage and distribution of bulk water and bulk fuel.

== Subordinate units ==
- Headquarters and Service Company
- Explosive Ordnance Disposal Company
- Engineering Support Company
- Engineer Company A
- Engineer Company B
- Bulk Fuel Company

== History ==
=== Vietnam War ===
The 9th Engineer Support Battalion of the 3rd Marine Logistics Group was once titled the 9th Engineer Battalion. The 9th Engineer Battalion was activated on 1 November 1965 at the Marine Corps Base Camp Pendleton and was under the operational control of the Commanding General Force Troops, located at Marine Corps Air Ground Combat Center Twentynine Palms.

On 2 May 1966, elements of the battalion began deploying to the Republic of Vietnam and by 17 June 1966 all of the battalion had arrived in the country and were located in and around Chu Lai. There they repaired vital road networks and reconstructed many villages south of Chu Lai. 29 June 1966 found Alpha Company departing for Da Nang under the operational control of the 7th Engineer Battalion.

While in Vietnam the 9th Engineer Battalion was responsible for the repair and mine sweeps of many of the major highways and bridges, for camp construction, for building ferries and for supporting the army and many foreign units on the battlefront. The Battalion participated in operations such as Colorado, Fresno, Nappa, and Golden Fleece. On 2 March 1970; Hawaii became the next duty station for Company A, while the rest of the battalion was returned to Camp Pendleton by 11 September 1970. At Camp Pendleton the battalion became part of the 5th Marine Amphibious Brigade until it was deactivated and retired its colors on 30 October 1970.

The 9th Engineer Support Battalion was activated on 1 May 1976 on Okinawa, Japan. Since activated, Camp Hansen has served as home for the battalion.

=== The 1990s ===
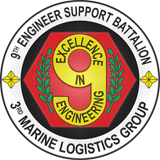
Old 9th ESB logo

Company A, 9th ESB was the lead element in planning and conducting humanitarian construction operations in East Timor from September to December 2000. Additionally, they have completed several Habitat for Humanity projects in Bangladesh and South Korea.

=== Global war on terror ===
9th ESB provided real-world operational support to Joint Task Force 510 (Special Operation Command), Basilan Island, Philippines in support of Operation Enduring Freedom from April to July 2002. By improving 81 kilometers of roads, creating helicopter landing zones, and opening an overgrown airfield, the Battalion improved the mobility of U.S. forces on the island during the Global War on Terrorism.

Explosive Ordnance Disposal Platoon continues to supports de-mining efforts throughout the Pacific Theater and provides technician in support of Presidential Operations as required.

9th Engineer Support Battalion earned the Marine Corps Engineer Association award for the best engineer support battalion of the year for 2000, 2001, 2007, and 2012.

9th ESB deployed in support of Operation Iraqi Freedom (OIF) from February 2006 until March 2007. During this deployment, they were based out of Camp Taqaddum in Al Anbar Province and built/repaired roads, cleared the roads of Improvised Explosive Devices, repaired buildings and constructed observation posts and command outposts for the Iraqi Army and Coalition Forces.

In September 2008, 9th ESB deployed for a second tour in support of Operation Iraqi Freedom (seven months long); they returned in March 2009. During the deployment, the battalion repaired roads, built working spaces and performed force protection construction and upgrades. 9th ESB's most recent deployment (and second tour) was to Helmand Province in Afghanistan in support of Operation Enduring Freedom (OEF) which occurred from November 2011 to June 2012. During this deployment, the battalion performed its assigned mission of repairing and constructing roads as well as providing fuel.

== See also ==
- List of United States Marine Corps battalions
- Organization of the United States Marine Corps
