= List of United States Marine Corps combat logistics companies =

A combat logistics company (CLC) is a logistics unit of the United States Marine Corps that is based at a Marine Corps air station. Formerly known as combat service support companies, they provide intermediate supply support and intermediate motor transport and engineer ground equipment maintenance to their Marine Aircraft Wings (MAWs); operate the Aerial Port of Embarkation/Debarkation (APOE/D) under the guidance of the Marine Expeditionary Force (MEF); and provide personnel to the Fleet Assistance Program (FAP) in support of legal, postal, exchange, security (military police), personnel administration, freight/passenger transportation (TMO) and bulk fuel support for their respective Marine Corps air station.

== Organization ==
Combat logistics companies fall under the command of a combat logistics regiment within the Marine Logistics Group. Companies are not provided to air stations in proximity to a larger logistics unit (such as Marine Corps Air Station Camp Pendleton).

Combat logistics companies provide intermediate ground logistics support to aviation units, to include supply and maintenance beyond organic capabilities.

== List of combat logistics companies ==
Insignia	Name	Nickname	Parent unit	Station	Location
	Combat Logistics Company 11		Combat Logistics Regiment 15	Marine Corps Air Station Miramar	San Diego, California
	Combat Logistics Company 16	Los Lobos	Combat Logistics Regiment 15	Marine Corps Air Station Yuma	Yuma, Arizona
	Combat Logistics Company 21		Combat Logistics Regiment 25	Marine Corps Air Station Cherry Point	Havelock, North Carolina
	Combat Logistics Company 23	Roughnecks	Combat Logistics Regiment 25	Marine Corps Air Station Beaufort	Beaufort, South Carolina
	Combat Logistics Company 35		Combat Logistics Regiment 35	Marine Corps Air Station Kaneohe Bay	Kāne'ohe Bay, Hawaii
	Combat Logistics Company 36	Dragons	Combat Logistics Regiment 35	Marine Corps Air Station Iwakuni	Iwakuni, Japan

== See also ==
- United States Marine Corps aviation
- Organization of the United States Marine Corps
- List of United States Marine Corps aviation support units
- Logistics Combat Element
