= Camp Kinser =

US Marine Corps logistics base in Okinawa, Japan

- Okinawa, Japan
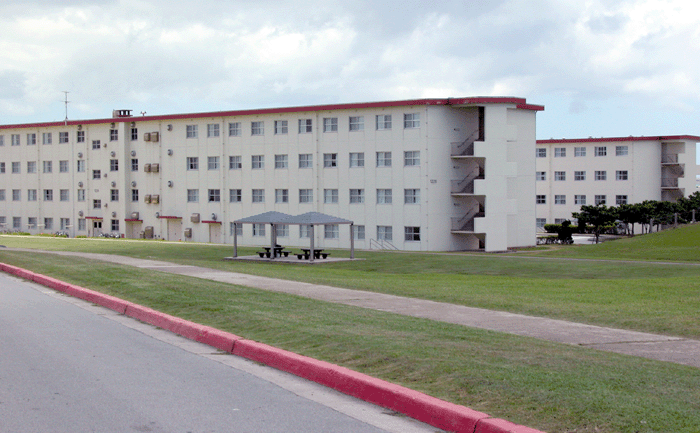
- Barracks buildings on Camp Kinser.

Site information
- Type: Military base
- Controlled by: United States Marine Corps

Location
- Coordinates: 26°15′09″N 127°41′51″E

Garrison information
- Past commanders: Colonel John E. Kasperski

Camp Kinser is a United States Marine Corps logistics base in Okinawa, Japan.

== Overview ==
Camp Kinser is a major logistics base for Marine Corps Forces on Okinawa. Its flagship command is the 3rd Marine Logistics Group. It sits adjacent to the East China Sea in the city of Urasoe, and just a few kilometers north of Naha.

Camp Kinser is the southernmost of nine Marine Corps bases on Okinawa, which make up Marine Corps Base Camp Smedley D. Butler. Another military installation, the Naha Port Facility which belongs to the U.S. Army is located south of Camp Kinser.

Camp Kinser is equipped with a DeCA Commissary, AAFES Shopette, and an AAFES PX, which houses a food court with eateries such as Subway, Pizza Hut, and Taco Bell. It sports a bowling alley, enlisted club, fitness center, and mess hall.

It was named for 21 year old Sergeant Elbert L. Kinser, who threw himself on a grenade to protect his fellow Marines at the Battle of Okinawa during World War II, and was posthumously awarded the Medal of Honor.

== History ==
Camp Kinser was founded in 1949, shortly after the Pacific War ended.

The USMC Currently, (2024) controls the military base, with co-op from the USAA

As of 2013, the U.S. has indicated that it wants to return to Camp Kinser also known as the Machinato or Makiminato Service Area to Japan by 2030.

== Environmental pollution ==
In 1975, a large leak of hexavalent chromium spilled at the base with contamination reportedly 8,000 times safe levels. The U.S. consulate in Naha dismissed the accident as a "flap" and warned "the newspapers and the leftists will certainly make good use of this issue against us". In 1993, the US government issued a classified report entitled "USFJ Talking Paper on Possible Toxic Contamination at Camp Kinser, Okinawa". Publicly available U.S. military documents have quoted excerpts suggesting extensive pollution with Vietnam era chemicals stored there, like insecticides including DDT (dichlorodiphenyltrichloroethane) and heavy metals, rodenticides, herbicides, inorganic and organic acids, alkalis, inorganic salts, organic solvents like vapor degreasers and ferric chloride, of which 12.5 tons were buried.

Evidence of wildlife contamination are the 2013 finding of mongooses caught near the installation with high levels of polychlorinated biphenyls and the September 2015 report of habu snakes from the vicinity of Camp Kinser with elevated concentrations of polychlorinated biphenyls and DDT. In 2009 six Japanese workers of a warehouse on the base had fallen ill of an unknown illness. A scholar from Okinawa International University has speculated that "the Pentagon wants to conceal the reality of contamination that would damage the political value of Camp Kinser's return".

== Education ==
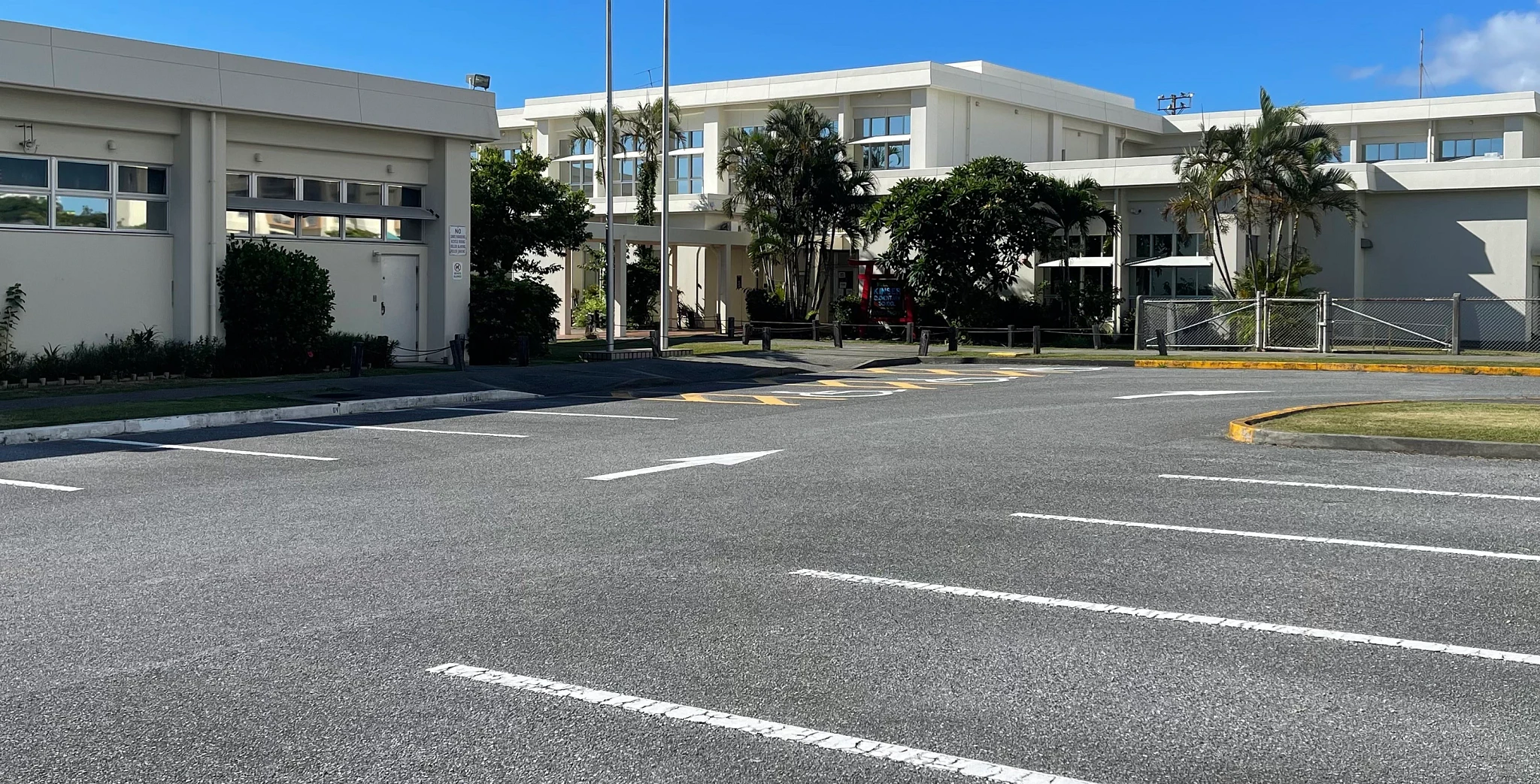
Kinser Elementary School

The Department of Defense Education Activity (DoDEA) operates Kinser Elementary School at Camp Kinser. Beginning operations on April 22, 1987, it replaced Makiminato Elementary School in the Makiminato Housing Area.

== Resident Commands ==
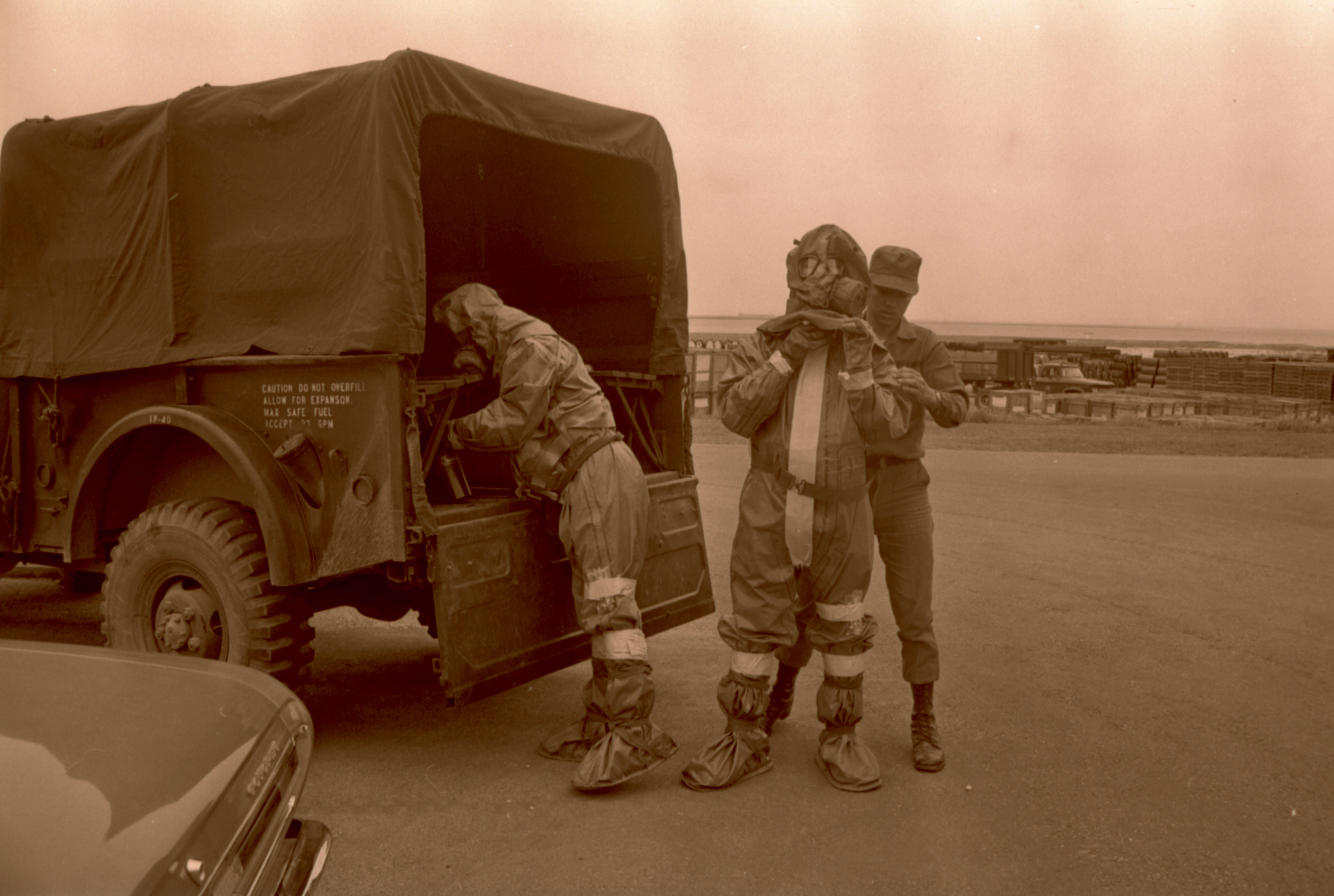
Briefing session for Operation Red Hat, May 11, 1971, a demonstration for Japanese press of actions that would be taken in the event a chemical munition was found to be leaking during transport. Retrograde chemicals from Vietnam are in background.

- 3rd Maintenance Battalion
- 3rd Marine Logistics Group
- 3rd Supply Battalion
- Combat Logistics Regiment 35
- Combat Logistics Regiment 37

== See also ==
- Naval Base Okinawa
