= Combat Logistics Regiment 15 =

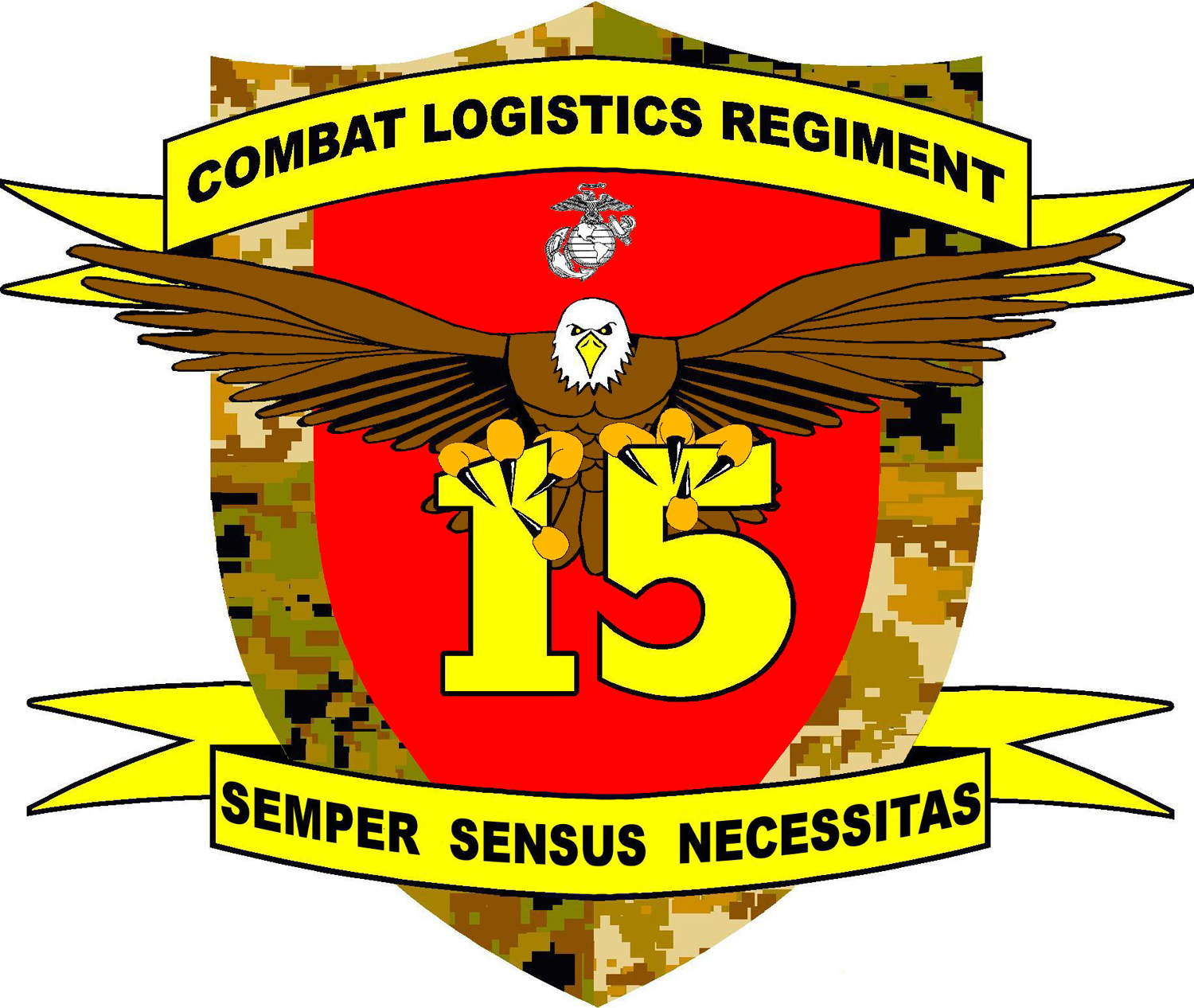
- CLR-15 insignia
- Active: January 2003– 1 July 2020
- Country: United States
- Branch: United States Marine Corps
- Type: Logistics Supply Regiment
- Role: Logistics Supply
- Part of: 1st Marine Logistics Group; I Marine Expeditionary Force
- Garrison/HQ: Marine Corps Base Camp Pendleton
- Motto: "Lean Forward"

Commanders
- Current commander: Col Patrick Tucker (final CO upon deactivation)

Combat Logistics Regiment 15 (CLR-15) was a logistics regiment of the United States Marine Corps. When active, it fell under the command of the 1st Marine Logistics Group and I Marine Expeditionary Force (I MEF). The unit was based out of Marine Corps Base Camp Pendleton, California, United States.

== Mission ==
CLR-15 was the 1st MLG's general support logistics regiment tasked with providing intermediate supply, distribution system support, intermediate maintenance and level II health service support to the warfighter across the spectrum of conflict in any environment. Additionally, they provide general support tactical logistics support to the 1st Marine Division, 3rd Marine Aircraft Wing and I MEF Headquarters Group in order to sustain Marine Air-Ground Task Force (MAGTF) operations beyond the supported unit's organic capabilities.

== History ==
Activated in January 2003, Combat Service Support Group 15 (CSSG 15) was renamed as CLR 15 in March 2006 after the unit returned from Kuwait where it supported Operation Iraqi Freedom. CLR 15 deployed in support of Operation Iraqi Freedom three times and deployed once to Afghanistan in support of Operation Enduring Freedom. From 2014 to present, CLR 15 personnel and equipment deployed to Iraq and Kuwait in support of Operation Inherent Resolve while concurrently providing supply and ground maintenance chains for deployed forces.

As part of the on-going reorganization of the Marine Corps, the regiment was deactivated on 1 July 2020.

== Subordinate units ==
- Headquarters Company, CLR-15
- 1st Supply Battalion
- 11th Combat Logistics Company
- 16th Combat Logistics Company
- 1st Maintenance Battalion

== Unit awards ==
A unit citation or commendation is an award bestowed upon an organization for the action cited. Members of the unit who participated in said actions are allowed to wear on their uniforms the awarded unit citation. CLR-15 was presented with the following awards:

| Streamer | Award | Year(s) | Additional Info |
|---|---|---|---|
| | Presidential Unit Citation Streamer | 2003 | Iraq |
| | Navy Unit Commendation Streamer with one Bronze Star | 2004-05, 2006-07 | Iraq |
| | National Defense Service Streamer | 2001–present | War on terrorism |
| | Afghanistan Campaign Streamer with one Bronze Star | | |
| | Iraq Campaign Streamer with four Bronze Stars | | |
| | Global War on Terrorism Expeditionary Streamer | | War on terrorism |
| | Global War on Terrorism Service Streamer | 2001–present | War on terrorism |

== See also ==
- List of United States Marine Corps regiments
