= Combat Logistics Regiment 35 =

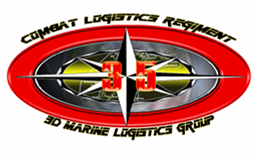
- CLR-35 insignia
- Active: 20 October 2006 -
- Country: United States
- Allegiance: United States of America
- Branch: United States Marine Corps
- Type: Logistics
- Role: Intermediate supply and maintenance support
- Part of: 3rd Marine Logistics Group; III Marine Expeditionary Force
- Garrison/HQ: Camp Kinser, Okinawa, Japan
- Motto: N/A
- Engagements: Vietnam War; Operation Desert Storm; Operation Enduring Freedom; Operation Iraqi Freedom

Commanders
- Current commander: N/A

The Combat Logistics Regiment 35 (CLR-35) was a logistics unit of the United States Marine Corps that was headquartered at Camp Kinser, Okinawa, Japan. When active, the unit fell under the 3rd Marine Logistics Group (3rd MLG) and the III Marine Expeditionary Force (III MEF). The unit was formerly known as 3rd Materiel Readiness Battalion but officially changed its designation on October 20, 2006.

== Subordinate units ==
- Headquarters Company
- Combat Logistics Company 33
- Combat Logistics Company 36

== Mission ==
Provides integrated intermediate supply and maintenance support to III Marine Expeditionary Force including isolated components in garrison and when deployed as a MEF or as a part of a MAGTF in expeditionary conditions.

== Unit awards ==
A unit citation or commendation is an award bestowed upon an organization for the action cited. Members of the unit who participated in said actions are allowed to wear on their uniforms the awarded unit citation. CLR-35 was presented with the following awards:

Streamer	Award	Year(s)	Additional Info
	Meritorious Unit Commendation Streamer	2004-2005	Indonesia
	National Defense Service Streamer	2001–present	War on terrorism
	Global War on Terrorism Expeditionary Streamer		War on terrorism
	Global War on Terrorism Service Streamer		War on terrorism

== See also ==
- List of United States Marine Corps regiments
- Organization of the United States Marine Corps
