= 2nd Maintenance Battalion =

2d Maintenance Battalion
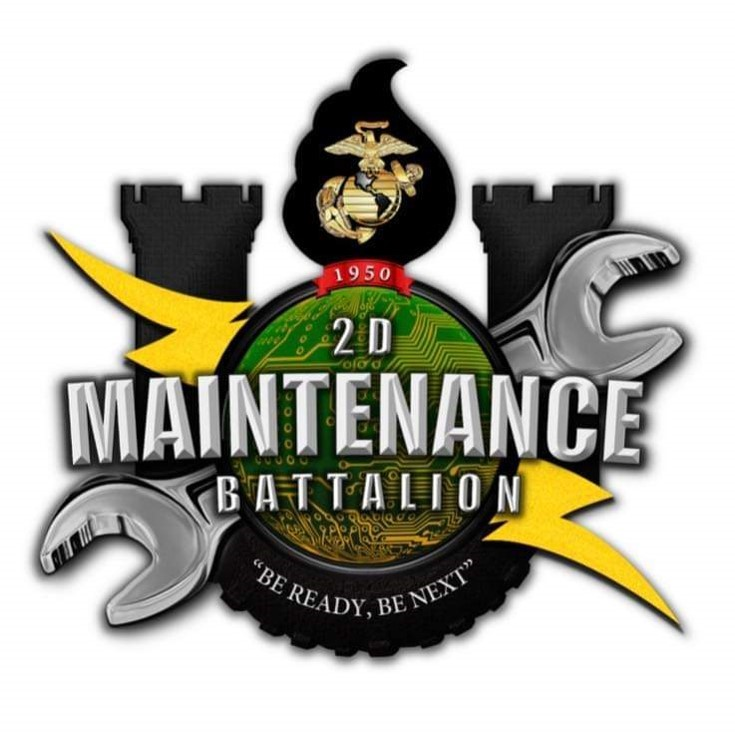
- 2nd Maintenance Battalion insignia
- Active: October 20, 1950 - present
- Country: United States
- Branch: USMC
- Role: Combat service support
- Part of: 2nd Marine Logistics Group
- Garrison/HQ: Marine Corps Base Camp Lejeune
- Mottos: "Be Ready, Be Next"
- Engagements: Operation Iraqi Freedom * 2003 invasion of Iraq

The 2nd Maintenance Battalion is a battalion of the United States Marine Corps that provides field-level intermediate maintenance for the II Marine Expeditionary Force's tactical ordnance, engineer, motor transport, communications electronics and general support ground equipment. They are based out of Marine Corps Base Camp Lejeune, North Carolina and fall under the command of 2nd Marine Logistics Group.

== Subordinate units ==
- Headquarters And Service Company (H&S Co)
- Ordnance Maintenance Company (OMC)
- Electronic Maintenance Company (ELMACO)
- Tactical Maintenance Company (TMC)

== Mission ==
To provide direct and general support, intermediate (2d through 4th echelon) maintenance support for Marine Corps furnished tactical ordnance, engineer, motor, communications-electronics and general support equipment of II MEF. To provide reparable support to include stock, store and fiscal accounting for normal accounting for normal and low-density reparables.

== History ==
Battalion Commanding Officers

• 2026-Present LtCol Steven Kasdan

• 2024-2026 LtCol Joey Donado

• 2022–2024 LtCol Greg Duesterhaus

• 2020-2022 LtCol Christina Henry

• 2018-2020 LtCol Kate Murray

• 2016-2018 LtCol Erik Smith

Battalion Sergeants Major

• 2026-Present SgtMaj David Spurling

• 2025-2026 SgtMaj Mark Miller

• 2023-2025 SgtMaj Jeffrey Palmer

• 2022–2023 SgtMaj Jonathan Carranza

• 2021-2022 SgtMaj Joseph Sorgie

• 2020-2021 SgtMaj Joe Wilborn

• 2017-2020 SgtMaj Charles Peoples

The 2nd Maintenance Battalion (2nd Maint Bn) previously fell under the command of Combat Logistics Regiment 25 (CLR-25), as a subordinate unit of 2d MLG. In 2020, CLR-25 was dissolved, and 2nd Maint Bn reported directly to 2d MLG. In February 2024, 2d Supply Battalion redesignated as 2nd Combat Readiness Regiment and 2nd Maint Bn now reports directly to 2nd CRR.

== See also ==
- History of the United States Marine Corps
- List of United States Marine Corps battalions
