= Camp Hansen =

U.S. Marine Corps base in Japan

- Okinawa, Japan
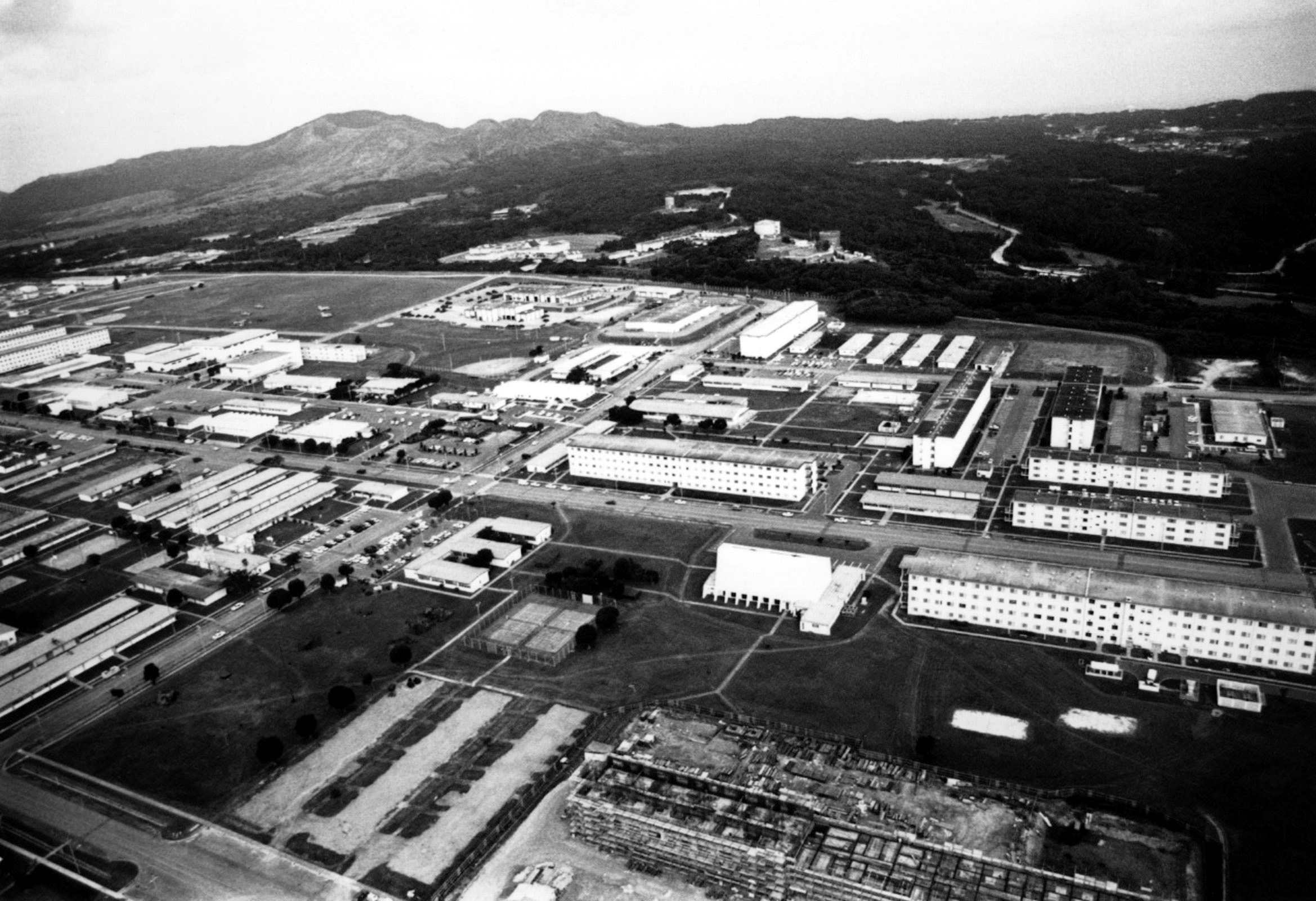
- Aerial view of Camp Hansen in 1996

Site information
- Type: Military base
- Controlled by: USMC

Location
- Coordinates: 26°28′N 127°55′E

Camp Hansen is a United States Marine Corps base located in Okinawa, Japan. The camp is situated in the town of Kin, near the northern shore of Kin Bay, and is the second-northernmost major installation on Okinawa, with Camp Schwab to the north. The camp houses approximately 6,000 Marines nowadays, and is part of Marine Corps Base Camp Butler, which itself is not a physical base and comprises all Marine Corps installations on Okinawa.

Camp Hansen is named for Medal of Honor recipient Dale M. Hansen, a Marine Corps private who was honored for his heroism in the fight for Hill 60 during the Battle of Okinawa. Hansen was killed by a Japanese sniper three days after his actions on Hill 60.

Built on the site of the former Chimu Airfield, the Camp was completed on 20 September 1965 after 29 months of construction by USN Mobile Construction Battalions 3, 9, and 11.

== Tenant units ==
- Headquarters, 12th Marine Regiment
- 3rd Battalion 12th Marines
- 3rd Law Enforcement Battalion
- 3rd Intelligence Battalion
- 7th Communication Battalion
- 12th Marine Littoral Regiment
- 31st Marine Expeditionary Unit
- 5th Air Naval Gunfire Liaison Company (ANGLICO)
- 9th Engineer Support Battalion
- Special Operations Training Group
- Elements of the 3rd Reconnaissance Battalion.
- 3rd Marine Division Truck Company
- III MEF Information Group (MIG)
- 2nd Battalion 11th Marines
- 3rd Ordnance Maintenance Company (OMC)
- 9th Engineer Support Battalion

== Base information ==
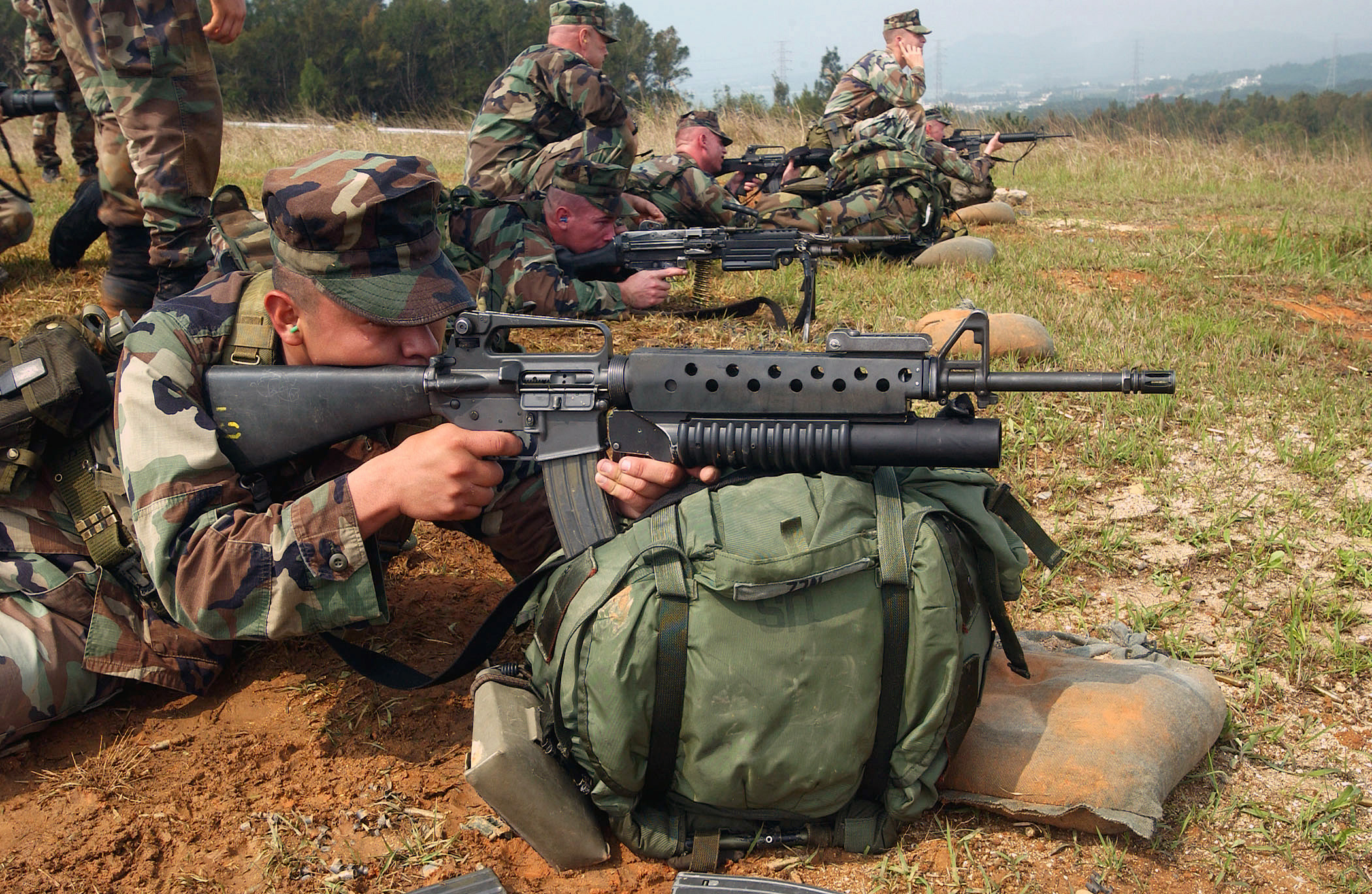
A U.S. Marine takes aim with an M16A2

The base is home to the Central Training Area, which includes several firing ranges, a pair of shooting houses which support live fire training, and other training areas, being one of the few locations on the island where weapons firing is permitted. Also located at Camp Hansen is a brig, a confinement facility that houses U.S. military members from around the Far East for short term sentences.

Facilities include a Post Exchange, a theater, a convenience store, two gyms, and a "consolidated entertainment facility" known as The Palms, which has two restaurants, as well as enlisted, SNCO, and officer clubs.

In March 2008, the Japan Ground Self-Defense Force began training at Camp Hansen, as part of the reorganization of U.S. forces in Japan and the move towards sharing facilities between American and Japanese troops.

The adjacent town known as "Kin-Town" (Previously Kin-ville") by the local Marine Corps population has seen a significant reduction of night time activity compared to previous generations of the 1990s and before - specifically the "golden era" during the Vietnam War and post 1972 return of the island back to Japan thru to the 1980s. This is due to the removal of many sex workers that were brought over from the Philippines in the 1980s on visas and exploited in houses of prostitution.

Other contributing factors are the restrictions now put on junior enlisted personnel in order to reduce alcohol related incidents by the enforcement of "Liberty Buddies" and midnight return to base.

Prospects for a general return to previous levels of activities will be further reduced due to Marines relocating from Okinawa to Guam, which will impact Kin-Town directly.

Some U.S. Marines in Okinawa are indeed choosing to stay on base rather than venture into local towns. This trend is influenced by several factors, including the ongoing relocation of Marines to Guam as part of a US-Japan agreement to reduce the military presence on Okinawa, a preference for the amenities and controlled environment of the base, and concerns about crime or cultural differences.

== Controversies ==
In September 1995, three U.S. servicemen stationed in Camp Hansen rented a van, and kidnapped and raped a 12-year-old Japanese girl. The crime "stirred furor" among Okinawans.

According to documents leaked by Edward Snowden and published by The Intercept, the site hosts an NSA collection facility codenamed CAMELUS. It uses a PUSHER-type antenna.

== See also ==
- List of U.S. Marine Corps bases
