= Marine Corps Base Camp Smedley D. Butler =

United States Marine Corps base in the Japanese prefecture of Okinawa

Coordinates: 26.297360°N 127.782983°E

Marine Corps Base Smedley D. Butler
- Okinawa, Japan
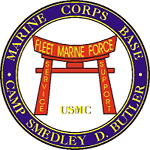
- MCB Butler logo

Site information
- Type: Military base
- Controlled by: USMC

Site history
- Built: 1955
- In use: 1955–present

Garrison information
- Past commanders: Frank E. Garretson
- Garrison: III MEF

Marine Corps Base Camp Smedley D. Butler (or simply Butler Marine Base) is a United States Marine Corps base located in the Japanese prefecture of Okinawa. It was named after Marine Corps Major General and twice Medal of Honor recipient Smedley D. Butler.

== Installations ==
Camp Smedley D. Butler is actually a collection of facilities and satellite installations spread throughout Okinawa. Camp Smedley D. Butler was formerly called Camp or Fort Buckner, named for Army General Simon Bolivar Buckner Jr., who commanded ground forces in the invasion of Okinawa and was killed in the last days of the battle. The renaming of Buckner to Butler occurred after most U.S. Army troops left Okinawa, and the base was transferred to the USMC.

Camp	Location
Camp Gonsalves	Kunigami and Higashi
Camp Schwab	Nago
Camp Hansen	Kin
Camp McTureous	Uruma
Camp Courtney	Uruma
White Beach	Uruma
Camp Shields	Okinawa City
Camp Foster, formerly Camp Zukeran (1980)	Ginowan
Camp Lester, formerly Camp Kuwae (1980)	Chatan
Camp Kinser	Urasoe

Additionally, Marine Corps Air Station Futenma (including satellite Yomitan Auxiliary Airfield) and Marine Wing Liaison Kadena, while not part of the Camp Butler complex, shares many resources with it. Other Marine installations in Japan include Marine Corps Air Station Iwakuni and Camp Fuji.

== See also ==
- Okinawa Marine
- United States Forces Japan

== External links and references ==
- Butler's web site
- Camp S D Butler, GlobalSecurity.org
