= United States Marine Corps Military Police =

Uniformed law enforcement branch of the U.S. Marine Corps

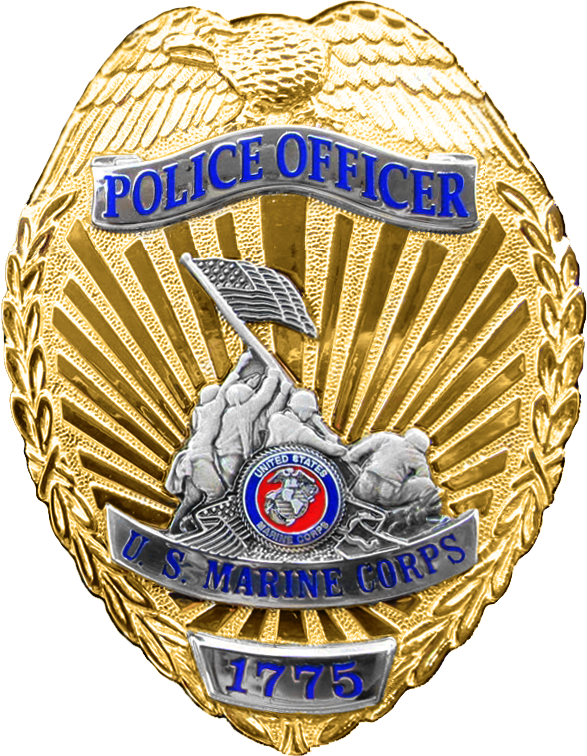
- Badge of USMC Military Police
- Country: United States
- Branch: United States Marine Corps
- Type: Military Police
- Part of: U.S. Department of the Navy
- Engagements: World War I World War II; Vietnam War; Invasion of Grenada (1983); Lebanon Conflict (1983); Persian Gulf War (1990-1991); War in Afghanistan (2001-2021); Iraq War (2003-2012)

The United States Marine Corps Military Police is the uniformed law enforcement branch of the United States Marine Corps.

== Mission ==
United States Marine Corps Military Police provide the Marine air-ground task force, component, and combatant commanders with scalable, highly-trained police forces capable of conducting law and order operations in an expeditionary environment across the range of military operations.

== History ==
=== Second World War ===
The document Amphibious Operations (Phib), Volume 19 titled Employment of Military Police and published in early 1945 (PHIB 19) provided a description of two basic Marine Corps military police organizations during World War II: the Fleet Marine Force military police battalion and the Marine division military police company.

The military police company organic to the Marine division possessed three platoons and a company headquarters. Company included approximately 100 Marines. The company commander also acted as the division provost marshal. Doctrinal provision existed for a division to request additional military police support from the next higher echelon of command when necessary.

Fleet Marine Force military police battalions, new organizations at the end of 1944, possessed four military police companies and a headquarters and service company. The first of these military police battalions was activated on 27 October 1944. These new battalions saw varying manning levels between 350 and 500 Marines. Doctrinally, one or more of these battalions was task organized into a force above the division level.

After the war, military police battalions were deactivated.

=== Vietnam War ===
During Vietnam War, military police battalions were reactivated for the first time.

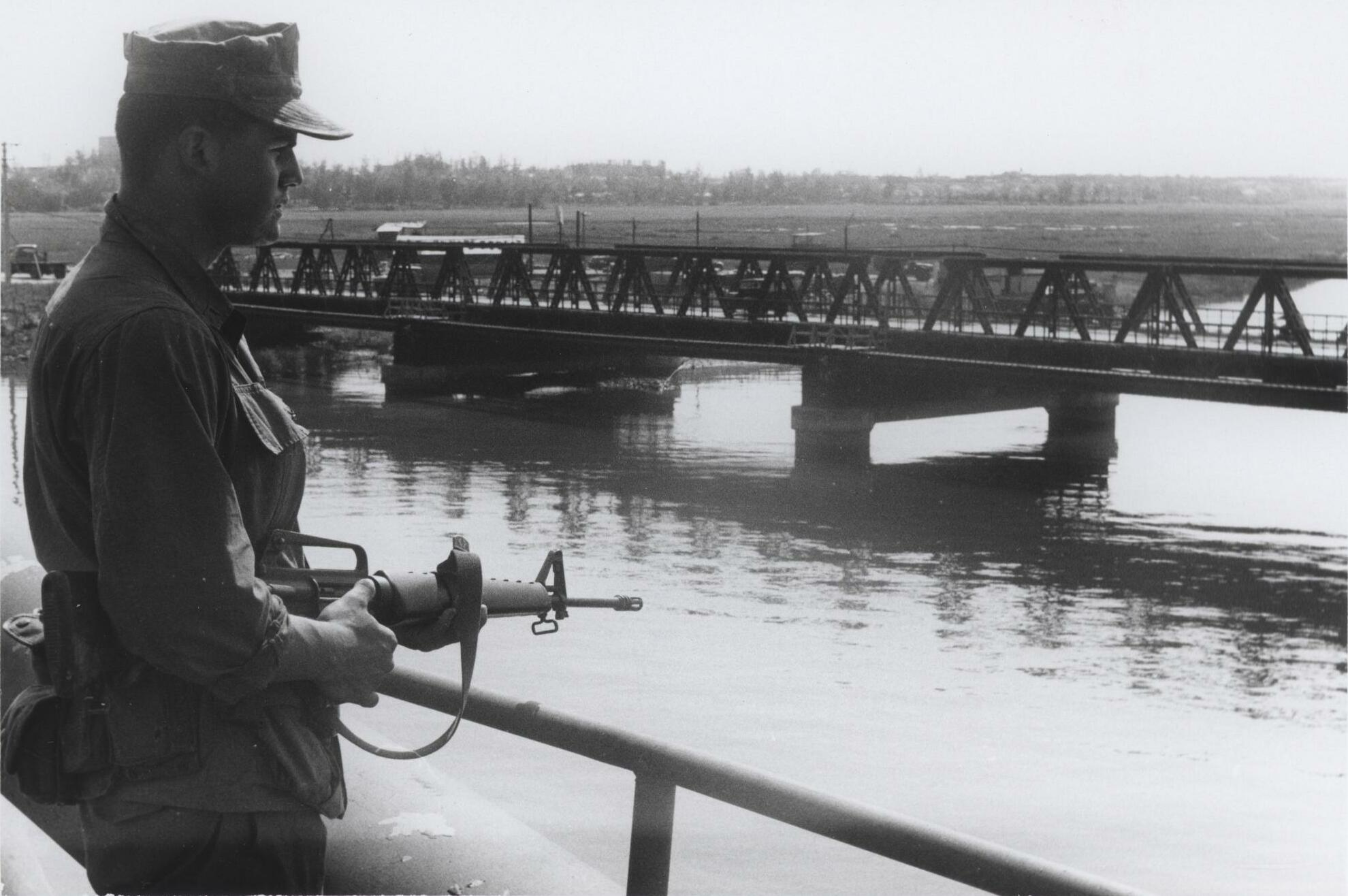
1st MP Battalion Marine guards the main bridges into Da Nang in 1969

On 28 May 1966 the 1st Military Police Battalion arrived at Da Nang, South Vietnam and relieved the 3rd Battalion, 3rd Marines from responsibility for the security of Da Nang Air Base.

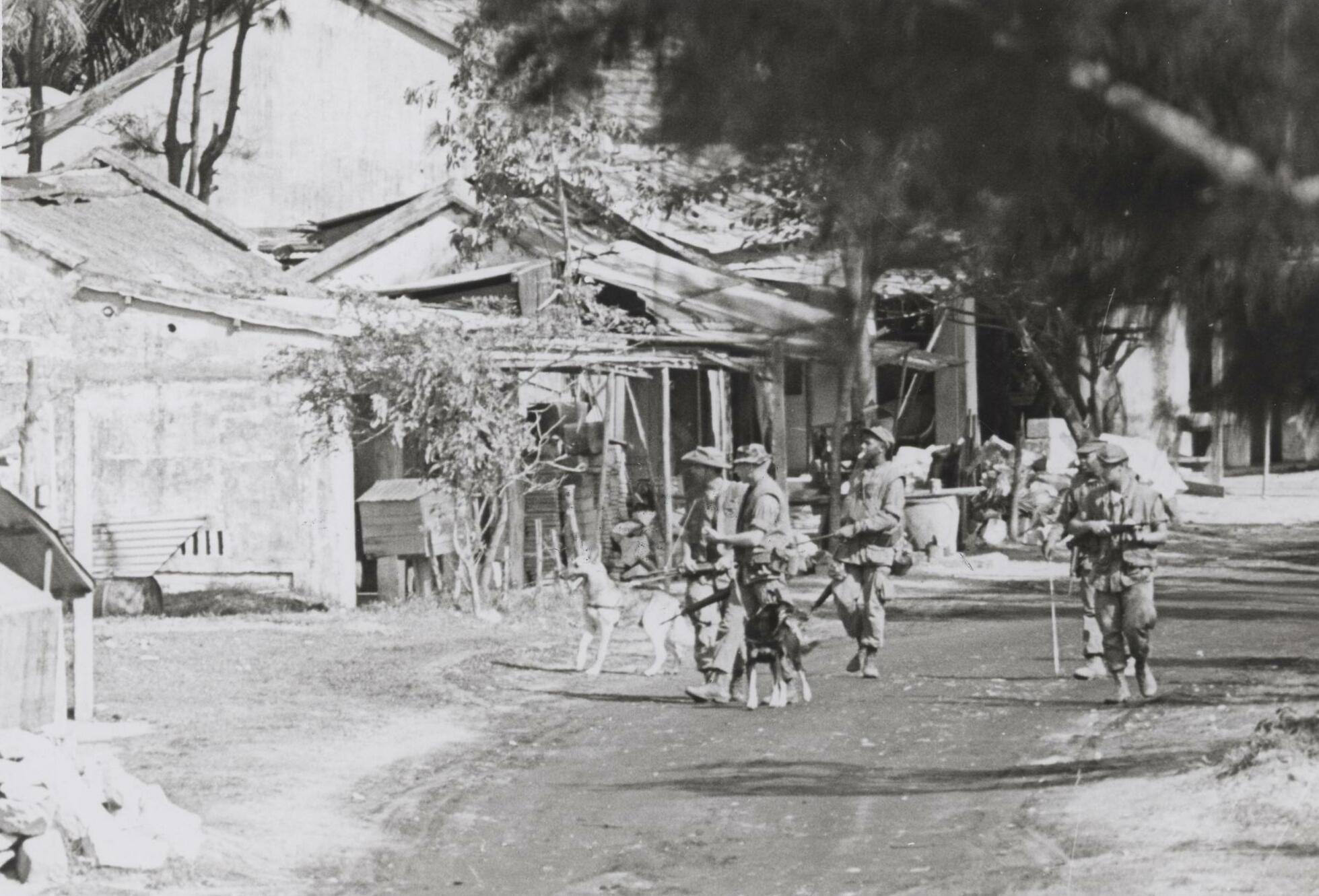
3rd MP Battalion scout dog patrol near Marble Mountain in 1968

By 1968 the 3rd Military Police Battalion had joined the 1st MP Battalion at Da Nang and both units were under the control of Force Logistic Command/1st Force Service Regiment which provided logistic support to the 1st Marine Division and the South Korean 2nd Marine Brigade. The 3rd MP Battalion operated the III MAF brig in Da Nang built to hold 200 prisoners. On 16 August 1968 a riot took place and the prisoners seized control of the brig for 2 days before being subdued by the MPs using tear gas. In addition to brig duties, the 3rd MP Battalion furnished war dogs for the 1st Marine Division, staffed the III MAF Criminal Investigation Department and contributed a 50-man MP contingent to the U.S. Armed Forces Police (AFP) in Da Nang. Marines from this AFP detachment protected the U.S. Consulate in Da Nang and helped guard the POW ward at the U.S. Army's 95th Evacuation Hospital. Until 1 January 1970, the commander of the 3rd MP Battalion had the additional duty of III MAF Provost Marshal, as such, he had operational control of the AFP in Da Nang.

The 1st and 3rd MP Battalions fought in the defense of the Da Nang Vital Area in the Tet and Phase III offensives of 1968 and the Tet 1969 attacks.

On 10 August 1970, as the 3rd MP Battalion prepared for redeployment in Operation Keystone Robin Alpha, the 1st MP Battalion assumed control of the Marine war dog teams and also took over the 3rd Battalion's security responsibilities in the Da Nang Vital Area.

In early 1971 the 1st MP Battalion was based at Camp Stokes near Da Nang AB. On 7 May 1971, with the cessation of all Marine combat in South Vietnam, the battalion ended small-unit operations and turned defense of Da Nang AB over to the Army of the Republic of Vietnam 104th Regional Force Battalion and the 796th Regional Force Company. The battalion retained its AFP and brig duties throughout the rest of May, as well as guarding the remaining 3rd Marine Amphibious Brigade cantonments. On 5 June the battalion was released from all AFP tasks and the battalion stood down on 7 June. By 24 June all elements had departed for Camp Pendleton, where the battalion was deactivated.

In 1970-1971, military police battalions were deactivated again.

=== War in Afghanistan ===
Military police battalions were reactivated for the second time in 2010s according to the Marine Corps Bulletin 5400 as law enforcement battalions. There were 3 active duty (1st, 2nd, 3rd) and 1 reserve (4th) law enforcement battalions. Each battalion included 3 law enforcement companies and headquarters company which included military working dog platoon, detention security, medical platoon, criminal investigation platoon and battalion HQ.

In 2016, Marine Corps organized own Military Police Officer Basic Course in Fort Leonard Wood, Missouri.

=== Modern times ===
In 2020-2021, all 3 active duty law enforcement battalions were deactivated as part of the Marine Corps’ Force Design 2030 plan.

== Organizational structure ==
United States Marine Corps Military Police is led by the Provost marshal of the United States Marine Corps and includes field Law Enforcement Battalions (active duty and reserve).

== Personnel ==
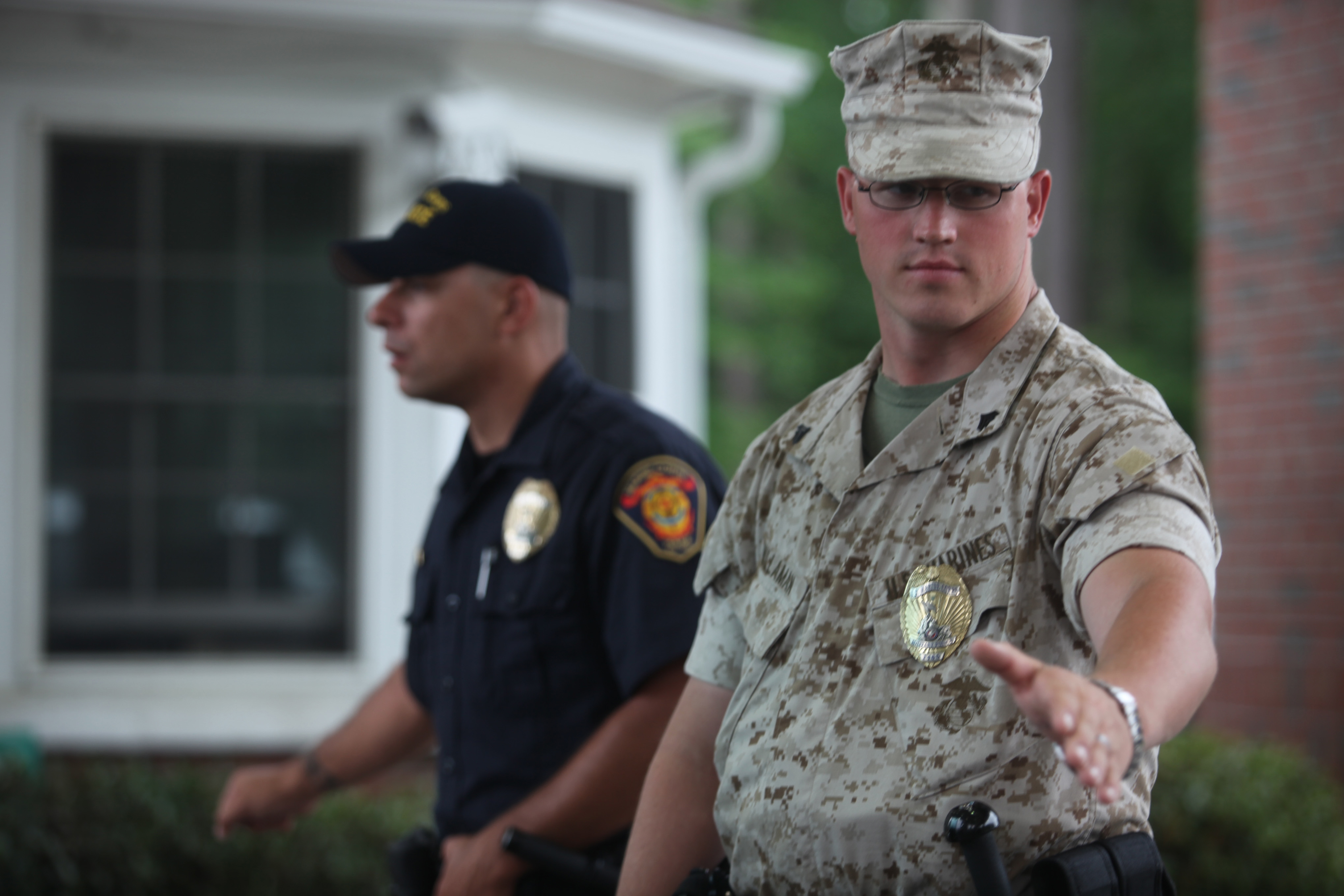
Cpl. James Willaman (foreground), a military police patrolman and Patrol Officer Tony Brienza (background) at Marine Corps Base Camp Lejeune, at main gate.

=== Military occupational specialty ===
The military occupational specialty (MOS) for non-supervisory is 5811. For supervisory it is MOS 5803.

=== Training ===
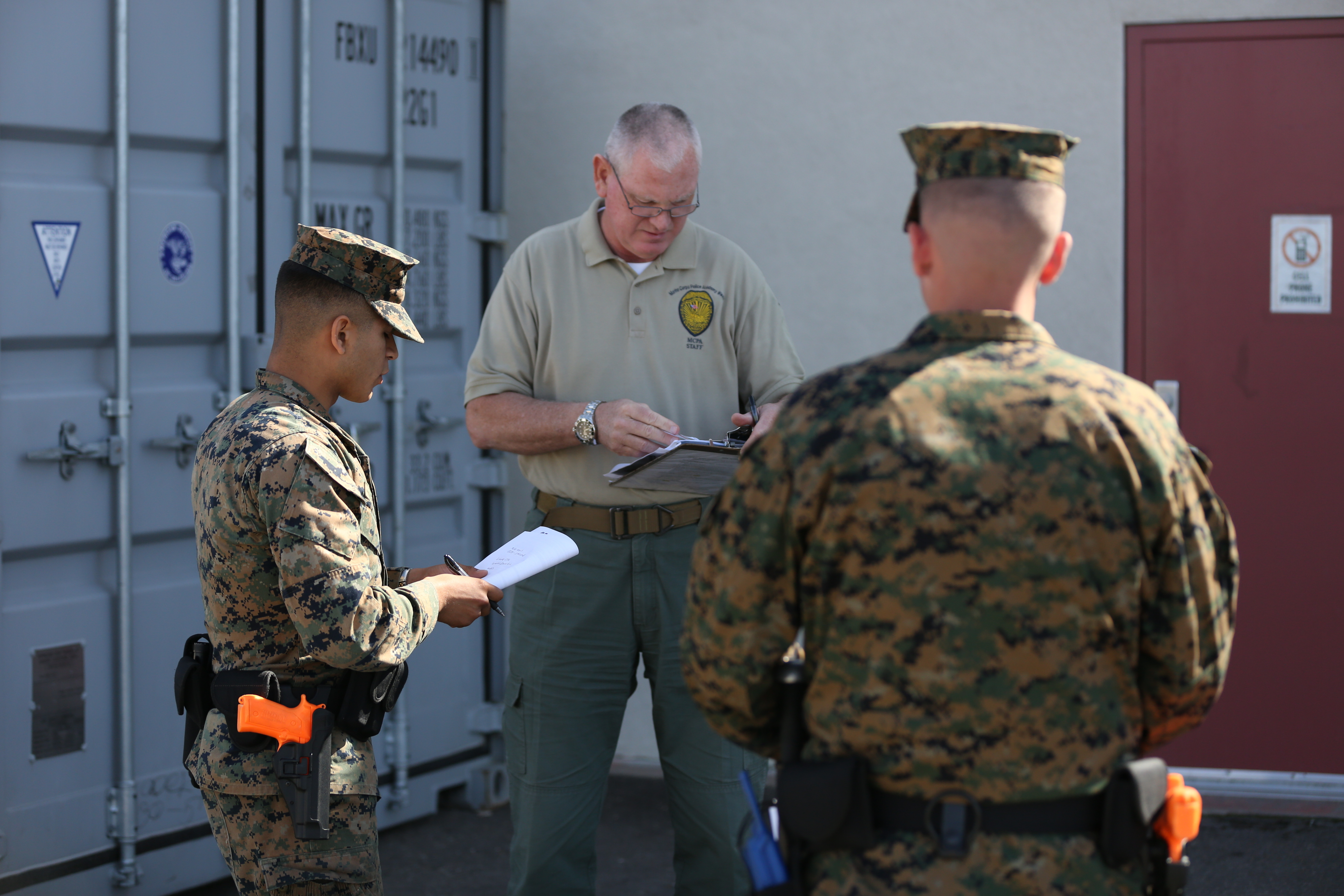
USMC MPs during training.

United States Marine Corps Military Police officers undergo Boot Camp training and Marine Combat Training, as all Marines do, but then go to Fort Leonard Wood, Missouri, where they undergo the Military Police Basic Course.

=== Duties ===
The duties of the United States Marine Corps Military Police officers are as follows:

- Force protection
- Physical security and crime prevention
- Access control
- Traffic control
- Respond to emergency calls

This is typically done through the following ways:

- motorized patrol
- foot patrol
- communications.

There are options to work as a dispatcher and promote to supervisory positions.

== Uniform and Equipment ==
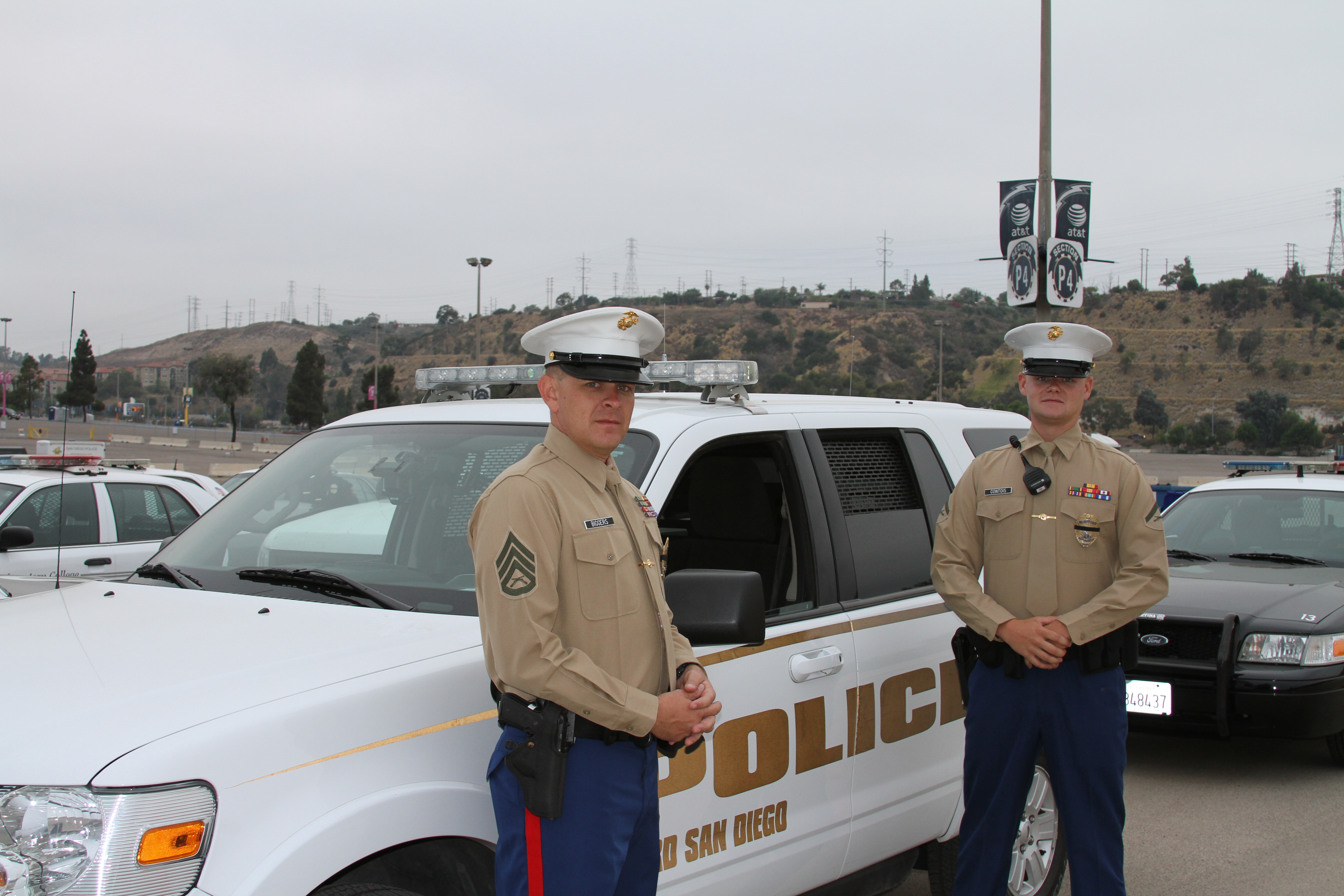
USMC MPs stand in front of a K9 vehicle Marine Corps Recruit Depot San Diego.

=== Uniform ===
United States Marine Corps Military Police wear standard USMC uniform, but with a United States Marine Corps Military Police (shield), generally on the left side of their uniform (for general base law enforcement duties).

This is generally the "Blue Dress C" (khaki long-sleeved shirt & tie, blue trousers, white peaked cap) or "Blue Dress D" (same as Dress C, but with short-sleeve shirt and no tie). Alternatively, the Service Uniform (green and brown) may be worn, or the Utility Uniform (MCCUU) (combats).

=== Equipment ===
The equipment for United States Marine Corps Military Police consists of a SIG Sauer M18 duty sidearm (pistol), ASP baton, OC spray, two-way radio, Taser, handcuffs, flashlight and gloves. The M9 Beretta is no longer being issued as the service pistol for Military Police personnel as of 2020. Other weapons include the M1014 Joint Services Combat Shotgun. Equipment will be worn around the waist on a duty belt, with shield on left breast.

=== Vehicles ===
For base law enforcement, marked police vehicles are used. They are generally equipped with red/blue lights, siren and public address system, computers and radios.

== See also ==
- Military Police Corps (United States)
- Master-at-arms (United States Navy)
- United States Air Force Security Forces
- Provost (military police)#United States
- Royal Marines Police
