= Combat Logistics Battalion 46 =

Reserve logistics battalion of the United States Marine Corps

- Active: 1 June 2009 – present
- Country: United States
- Allegiance: United States of America
- Branch: United States Marine Corps
- Type: Logistics
- Size: 900
- Part of: 4th Marine Logistics Group
- Garrison/HQ: Red Bank, New Jersey
- Engagements: Operation Enduring Freedom; Operation Iraqi Freedom

Commanders
- Current commander: LtCol. Joe E. Davis Jr.

Combat Logistics Battalion 46 (CLB-46) is a reserve logistics battalion of the United States Marine Corps. They were formed in 2009 and fall under the command of the 4th Marine Logistics Group (4th MLG). The unit is headquartered in Red Bank, New Jersey. The battalion was activated on 1 June 2009 at Marine Corps Base Camp Lejeune, North Carolina as a separate and detached command of the 4th MLG to directly support the wars in Iraq and Afghanistan. Members of the battalion were drawn from 54 sites, in 40 states across the nine battalions of the 4th MLG.

== Mission ==
Provide general and direct support and sustained combat service support above the organic capabilities of the support element of the Marine Air-Ground Task Force.

== Subordinate units ==
- Headquarters & Service Company
- Engineer Support Company
- Transportation Support Company
- Health Service Company
- Security Company
- Maintenance Company

== History ==
Their only deployment was in support of Operation Iraqi Freedom to assist in the Marine Corps' drawdown of forces. They arrived in Iraq in late August and officially took over responsibilities from for logistics support in western Iraq from Combat Logistics Battalion 7. During their time in Iraq they fell under the command of Combat Logistics Regiment 25 of the 2nd Marine Logistics Group. During this deployment, they provided Route Clarence Patrols, food, water, ammunition and fuel to forward operating bases throughout the Al Anbar Governorate, a vast desert province west of Baghdad. During this deployment, the battalion suffered no casualties. Members of the battalion began to return home in January 2010.

== See also ==
- List of United States Marine Corps battalions
