= List of United States Marine Corps battalions =

This is a list of current United States Marine Corps battalions, sorted by the mission they perform.

== Active units ==
=== Ground Combat Element battalions ===
The ground combat element (GCE) consists of those combat and combat support units whose primary mission is to, (1) engage with and destroy the enemy by fire and/or maneuver, and/or shock effect, performed by infantry, field artillery, and tank units, (2) provide close battlefield support to other GCE units by assault amphibian, combat assault, light armored reconnaissance, reconnaissance, and combat engineer units, or (3) provide immediate command and control, and limited logistical support including consolidated Navy personnel administration and motor transport (medium truck) support to subordinate GCE battalions and regiments (infantry and artillery only) by Marine division (MARDIV) headquarters battalions. Additionally, this battalion provides communications networking and law enforcement support across the GCE. The headquarters battalion also includes the division band, whose tactical mission is to serve as a provisional rifle platoon in providing division headquarters security.

Note: Some GCE battalions and regiments are provided air liaison officers/forward air controllers (i.e., Marine Corps naval aviators — aircraft pilots, and naval flight officers — airborne weapons and sensor systems officers) with specialized skills in coordinating air support of ground units) from the Marine Aircraft Wing (MAW) of the aviation combat element (ACE). These officers facilitate employment of Marine aviation in support of GCE units to perform offensive air support (e.g., close air support), assault support (e.g., troop, cargo, and casualty transport, aerial command and control, liaison, communications, and illumination, and close-in fire support by light/attack helicopters), and aerial reconnaissance (e.g., tactical reconnaissance and artillery spotting).

==== Infantry battalions ====
Infantry battalions are the heart and soul of the ground combat element. The mission of locating, closing with, and destroying the enemy with fire and maneuver and repelling the enemy's assault with fire and close combat lies with the "grunts". Marine infantry battalions often have limited organic equipment outside of small arms, infantry crew-served weapons (e.g., heavy machine guns, medium mortars, and anti-tank missiles), and a few light tactical trucks. Marine infantry primarily maneuvers by foot as light infantry, and must be supplemented with additional trucks to become motorized infantry or Amphibious Assault Vehicles to become mechanized infantry.

A Marine infantry battalion is usually organized into three rifle companies, a weapons company, and a headquarters and service company. The rifle company has a company headquarters, three rifle platoons, with three rifle squads each, and a weapons platoon with medium machineguns, mortars, and assault weapons sections. The weapons company includes a company headquarters, a heavy machinegun platoon, an 81mm mortar platoon, and an antiarmor platoon. Sometimes, the commander will mix these into Combined Anti-Armor Teams. The headquarters and service company includes all command, administration, intelligence, operations, logistics, and communication Marines and equipment, as well as the battalion's Scout Sniper platoon and Battalion Aid Station (BAS) staffed by U.S. Navy Hospital Corpsman. By 2030 three battalions will be disbanded, and some reflagged: 1/8th becoming 2/2nd, 2/8th becoming 4/6th, 8th Marine HQ and 3rd Btn disband.

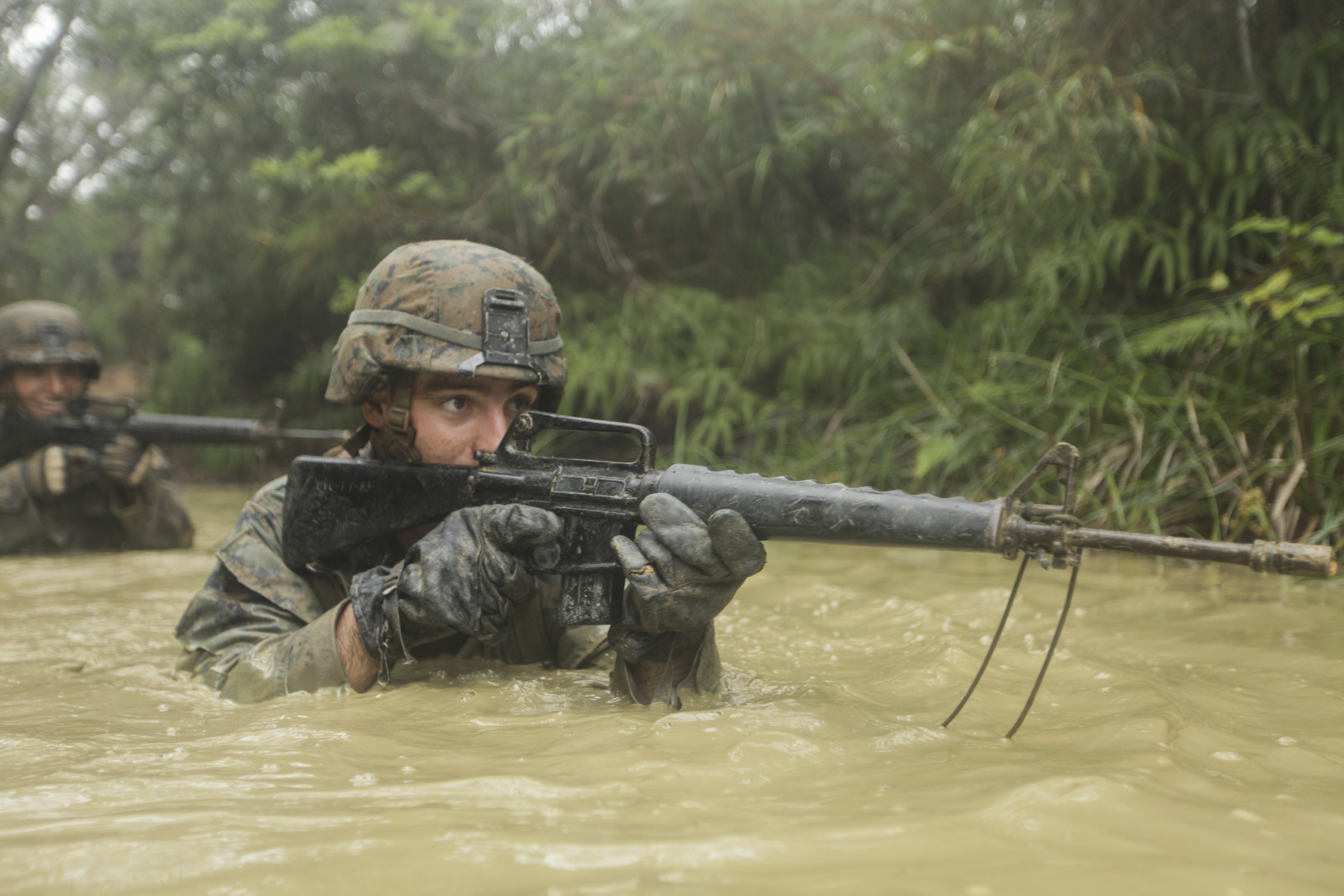
Marine Infantryman

Battalion Name	Insignia	Nickname	Location
1st Battalion, 1st Marines		First of the First	Camp Pendleton, California
2nd Battalion, 1st Marines		The Professionals	Camp Pendleton, California
3rd Battalion, 1st Marines		Thundering Third	Camp Pendleton, California
1st Battalion, 2nd Marines		Typhoon	Camp Lejeune, North Carolina
2nd Battalion, 2nd Marines		Warlords	Camp Lejeune, North Carolina
3rd Battalion, 2nd Marines		Betio Bastards	Camp Lejeune, North Carolina
2nd Battalion, 4th Marines		Magnificent Bastards	Camp Pendleton, California
3rd Battalion, 4th Marines		Darkside	MCAGCC Twentynine Palms, California
1st Battalion, 5th Marines		Geronimo	Camp Pendleton, California
2nd Battalion, 5th Marines		Raiders or Marauders	Camp Pendleton, California
3rd Battalion, 5th Marines		Darkhorse	Camp Pendleton, California
1st Battalion, 6th Marines		1/6 HARD	Camp Lejeune, North Carolina
2nd Battalion, 6th Marines		The Ready Battalion	Camp Lejeune, North Carolina
3rd Battalion, 6th Marines		Teufelhunden	Camp Lejeune, North Carolina
1st Battalion, 7th Marines		First Team	MCAGCC Twentynine Palms, California
2nd Battalion, 7th Marines		War Dogs	MCAGCC Twentynine Palms, California
3rd Battalion, 7th Marines		The Cutting Edge	MCAGCC Twentynine Palms, California
1st Battalion, 8th Marines		The Beirut Battalion	Camp Lejeune, North Carolina
2nd Battalion, 8th Marines		America's Battalion	Camp Lejeune, North Carolina
1st Battalion, 23rd Marines		Lone Star	Houston, Texas
2nd Battalion, 23rd Marines		Prepared and Professional	Pasadena, California
3rd Battalion, 23rd Marines		Lone Wolves	Belle Chase, Louisiana
1st Battalion, 24th Marines		The Terror from the North	Detroit, Michigan
2nd Battalion, 24th Marines		The Mad Ghosts	Chicago, Illinois
1st Battalion, 25th Marines		New England's Own	Ayer, Massachusetts
2nd Battalion, 25th Marines		Empire Battalion	Garden City, New York
3rd Battalion, 25th Marines		Cold Steel Warriors	Brook Park, Ohio

==== Littoral combat teams ====
Littoral combat teams contain the close combat and long-range surface to surface fires elements of the Marine littoral regiments.

Battalion Name	Insignia	Nickname	Location
3d Littoral Combat Team		Lava Dogs	MCB Hawaii, Hawaii
12th Littoral Combat Team		The China Marines	Camp Hansen, Okinawa

==== Artillery battalions ====
Field artillery units provide indirect, long-range cannon and rocket fire support for the Marine Air-Ground Task Force. Currently, artillery regiments contain two or three (11th Marines only) cannon battalions and are equipped with the M777 lightweight, towed, 155 mm, medium howitzer and the Expeditionary Fire Support System (EFSS) 120 mm, heavy mortar. Two regiments (11th Marines and 14th Marines) also have one rocket battalion equipped with the M142 High Mobility Artillery Rocket System (HIMARS) equipped with the MGM-140 ATACMS surface-to-surface, guided missile. Marine artillery battalions contain a Headquarters Battery and three or four firing batteries. Firing batteries contain a headquarters platoon (including a liaison section with three forward observer teams) and one or two firing platoons (depending upon weapons systems). The firing platoon(s) contain a battery operations center, a fire direction center, and four or six artillery sections (depending upon weapon system). Counter-battery radar is usually a regimental asset, but can be detached to augment battalions or batteries. By 2030 all but five artillery batteries will be disbanded.

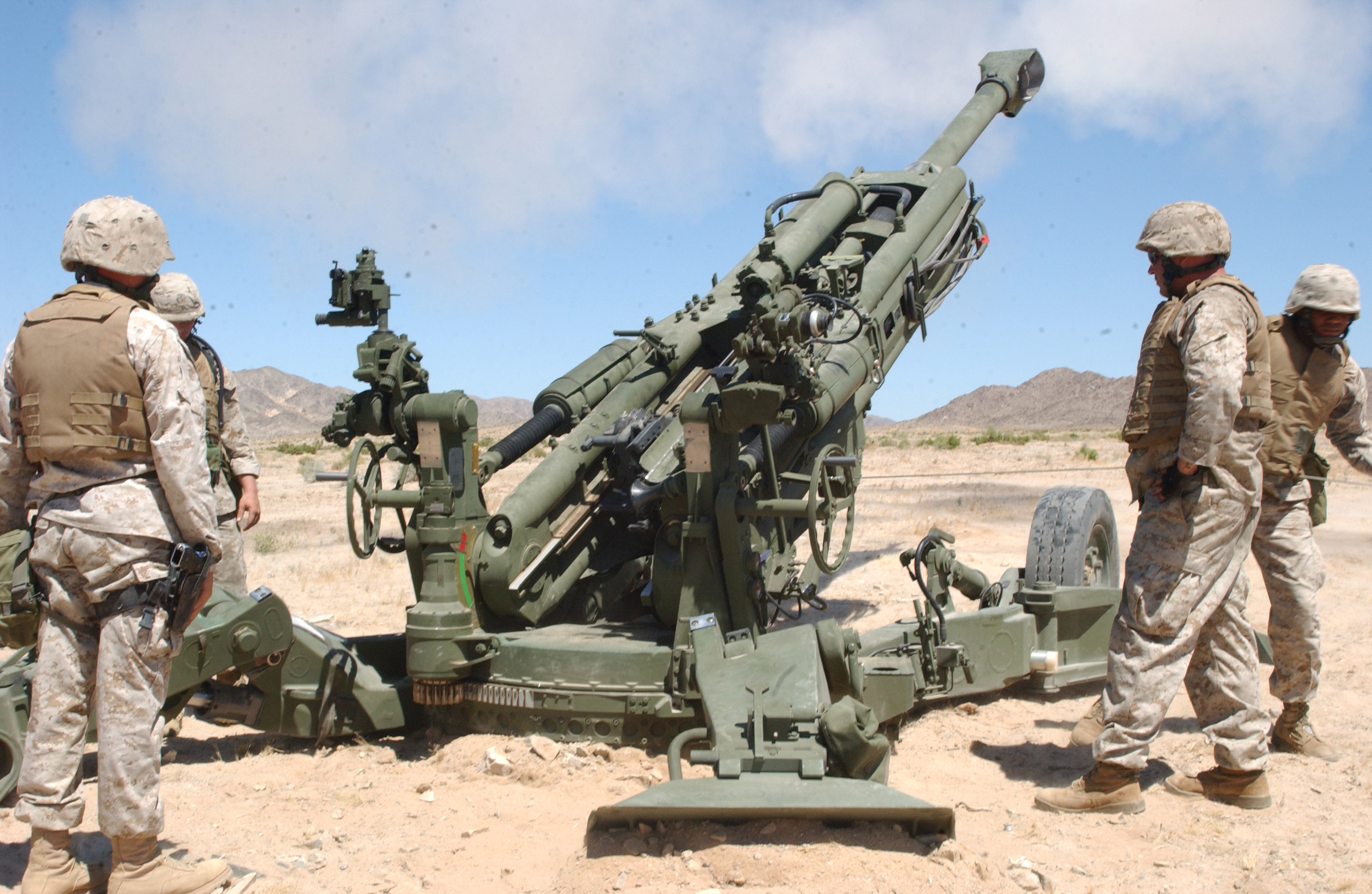
M777 howitzer firing

Battalion Name	Insignia	Nickname	Location
1st Battalion, 10th Marines		Nightmare	Camp Lejeune, North Carolina
2nd Battalion, 10th Marines		Gunslinger	Camp Lejeune, North Carolina
Fire Support Battalion, 10th Marines			Camp Lejeune, North Carolina
1st Battalion, 11th Marines		Cobra	Camp Pendleton, California
2nd Battalion, 11th Marines		Patriot	Camp Pendleton, California
3rd Battalion, 11th Marines		Thunder	MCAGCC Twentynine Palms, California
Fire Support Battalion, 11th Marines			Camp Pendleton, California
3rd Battalion, 12th Marines		Warriors of the Pacific	Camp Hansen, Okinawa, Japan
2nd Battalion, 14th Marines		Peacemaker	Grand Prairie, Texas
3rd Battalion, 14th Marines		Liberty	Philadelphia, Pennsylvania
5th Battalion, 14th Marines		Sharphunter	Seal Beach, California

==== Armor battalions ====
The mission of an armor unit is to conduct and support amphibious operations and other operations as required by landing and transporting to inland objectives the surface assault elements and their equipment, and by conducting light armored reconnaissance and limited offensive and defensive operations. When task-organized with infantry, tanks, and other forces, the battalion conducts combined arms operations as a separate maneuver element in support of the Marine Division.

Currently, Assault Amphibian (AA) battalions utilize the Amphibious Assault Vehicle (AAVP-7A1) and consist of a headquarters and service company and two to six AA companies. Each AA company is equipped with 48 AAVs (including personnel, command, and recovery variants) organized into three platoons of 12 AAVs each and an additional six AAVs in the company headquarters. Each AA platoon is capable of transporting an entire Marine rifle company plus any dismounted attachments (e.g., mortar forward observer teams, anti-tank missile crews, scout/sniper or reconnaissance squads) thus transforming into amphibious/mechanized infantry. (One AA company is capable of transporting the assault echelon of a Marine infantry battalion.) Although plans were in place to replace it with the Expeditionary Fighting Vehicle, the cancellation of the program is going to prolong use of the AAV.

Light Armored Reconnaissance (LAR) battalions use the LAV 25 series of vehicles and consist of a headquarters and service company and four LAR companies. Each LAR company is equipped with 27 LAVs (including 14 LAV-25, two mortar, four anti-tank, one command & control, three logistics, and one recovery variant).

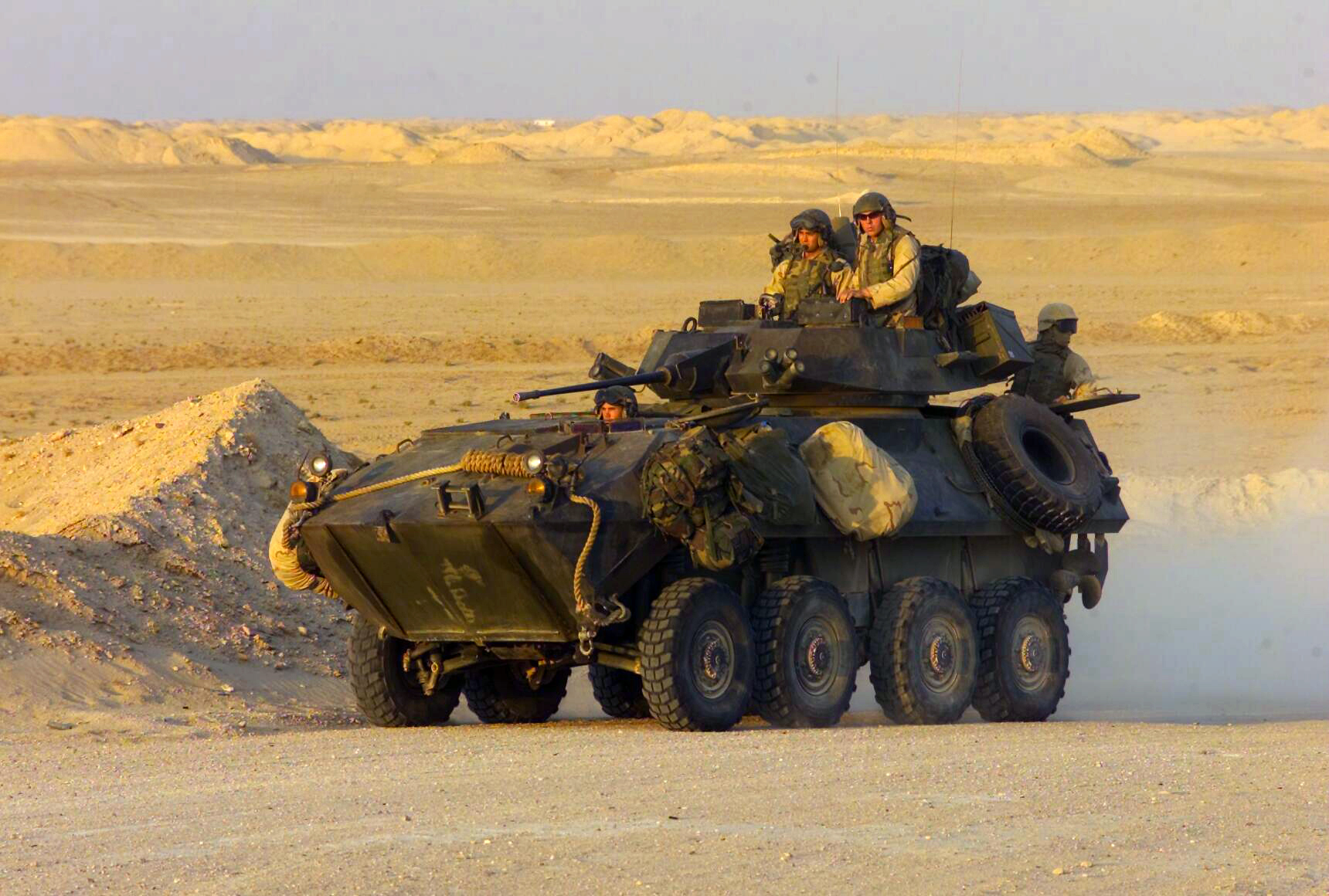
LAV 25

Battalion Name	Insignia	Nickname	Location
2nd Assault Amphibian Battalion		The First Wave	Camp Lejeune, North Carolina
3rd Assault Amphibian Battalion		3rd Tracks	Camp Pendleton, California
4th Assault Amphibian Battalion		4th Tracks	Tampa Bay, Florida
1st Light Armored Reconnaissance Battalion		Highlanders	Camp Pendleton, California
2nd Light Armored Reconnaissance Battalion		Destroyers	Camp Lejeune, North Carolina
3rd Light Armored Reconnaissance Battalion		Wolfpack	MCAGCC Twentynine Palms, California
4th Light Armored Reconnaissance Battalion		Iron Horse Marines	Camp Pendleton, California

==== Combat Engineer battalions ====
The mission of combat engineers is to provide mobility, counter mobility, survivability, and limited general engineering support. Mobility includes the assessment and fortification of roadways and bridges, the clearing of enemy obstacles and landmines, and assault breaching. Counter mobility includes creating obstacles and barriers for the enemy, which could include the destruction of structures and/or bridges. Survivability includes the fortification of positions and the construction of new outposts. Other jobs can include Explosive Ordnance Disposal (EOD), construction, and utilities (such as generators and refrigeration). Currently, combat engineers use a variety of tools for their trade. Some vehicles include the M9 Armored Combat Earthmover, D7 Bulldozer, M60A1 Armored Vehicle Launched Bridge, and various cranes and forklifts. Each combat engineer battalion consists of a headquarters and service company, three combat engineer companies, one mobility assault company, and an engineer support company.

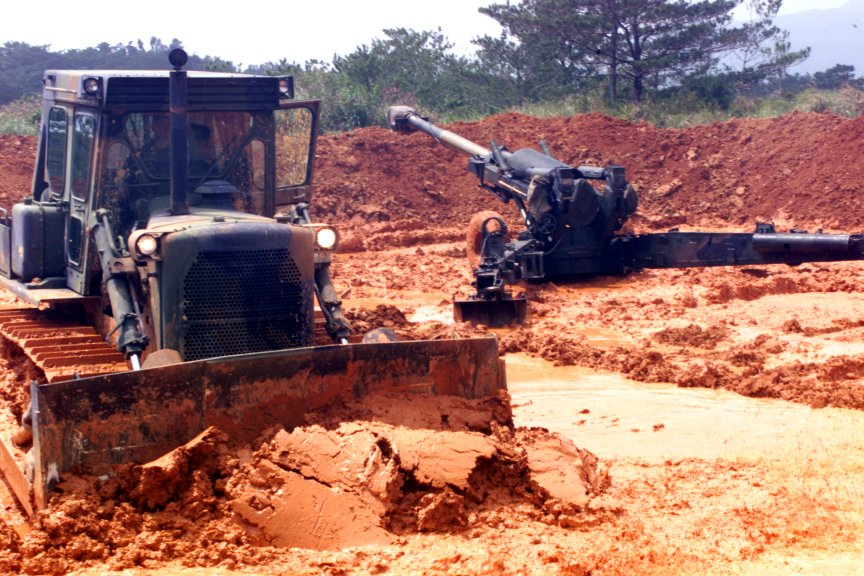
D7 Bulldozer

Battalion Name	Insignia	Nickname	Location
1st Combat Engineer Battalion		The Super Breed	Camp Pendleton, California
2nd Combat Engineer Battalion		That Other Battalion	Camp Lejeune, North Carolina
4th Combat Engineer Battalion		In my day job...	Baltimore, Maryland

==== Reconnaissance battalions ====
The mission of the reconnaissance battalions is to obtain information by visual observation about the activities and resources of an enemy or potential enemy, or about the meteorologic, hydrographic, or geographic characteristics of a particular area. They specialize in amphibious recon, including hydrography; as well as airborne recon, infiltration via surface, subsurface and airborne operations, and conducting limited scale raids and ambushes. The battalions consist of a headquarters and service company and one to four reconnaissance companies (divisional assets, individual companies usually attached to an RCT). All battalions (except 4th Recon) also have a force reconnaissance company dedicated to provide deep reconnaissance and direct action capability to a MEF HQ. (an additional separate force reconnaissance company exist in the Marine Forces Reserve.)

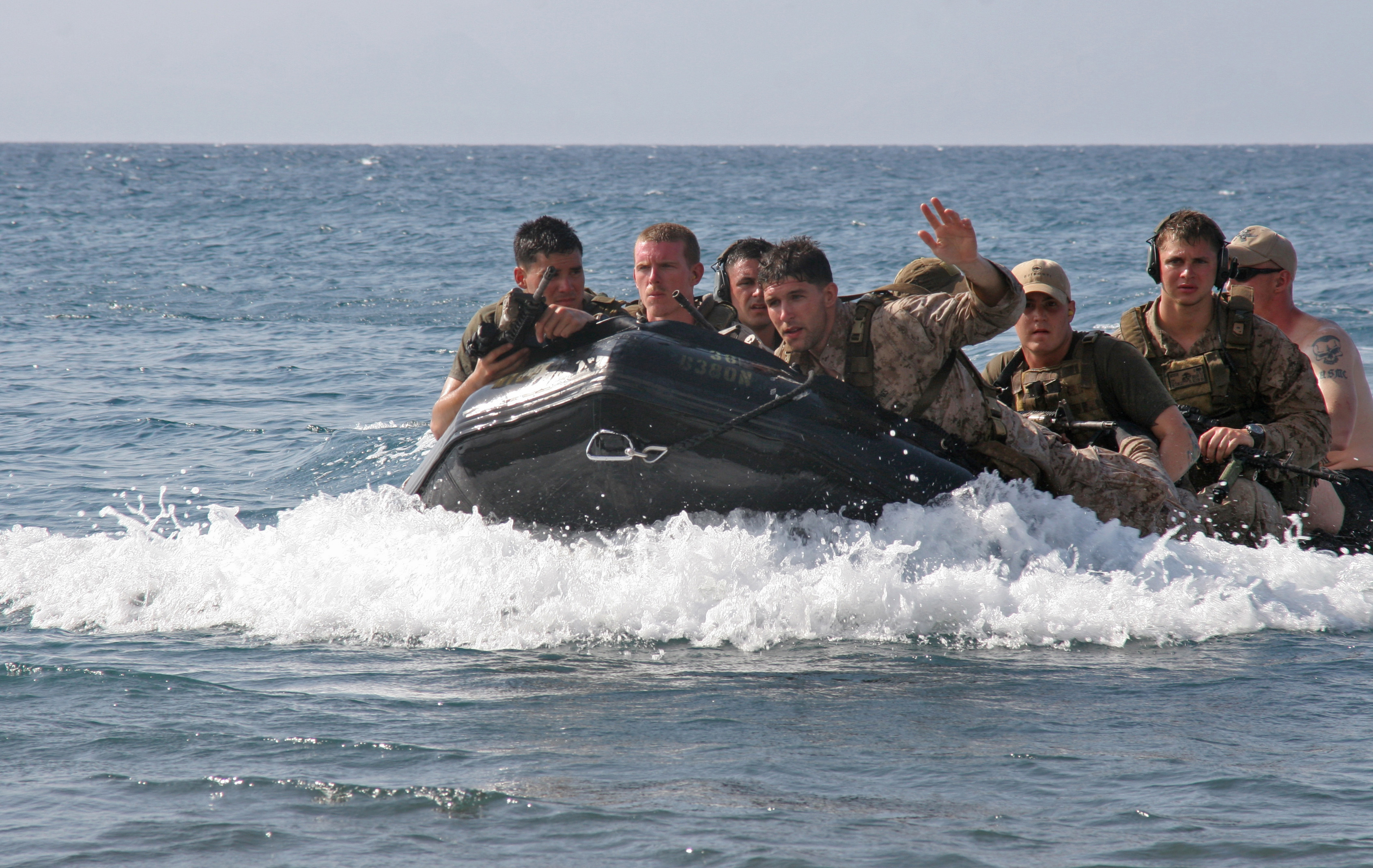
Recon Marines

Battalion Name	Insignia	Nickname	Location
1st Reconnaissance Battalion		Swift, Silent, Deadly	Camp Pendleton, California
2nd Reconnaissance Battalion		Chimera	Camp Lejeune, North Carolina
3rd Reconnaissance Battalion		Mortalis	Camp Schwab, Okinawa, Japan
4th Reconnaissance Battalion		Swift, Silent, Deadly	San Antonio, Texas

==== Headquarters battalions ====
Headquarters battalions provide the command and control, administration and logistics for a Marine division. Each MARDIV HQBN is uniquely organized to support its division. However, typically the battalion is commanded by a colonel, and consists of headquarters company (including the division band), communications company, truck company (2 in HQBN FIRSTMARDIV), and may include a military police company.

Battalion Name	Insignia	Nickname	Location
Headquarters Battalion 1st Marine Division		Standard Bearers	Camp Pendleton, California
Headquarters Battalion 2nd Marine Division		The Silent Second	Camp Lejeune, North Carolina
Headquarters Battalion 3rd Marine Division		Samurai	Camp Courtney, Okinawa, Japan
Headquarters Battalion 4th Marine Division		Fighting Fourth	New Orleans, Louisiana

=== Logistics Combat Element battalions ===
The logistics combat element (LCE) consists of those combat service support units whose primary mission is to, (1) provide direct combat logistics (i.e., motor transport and landing support, and limited engineer support, equipment maintenance, and ground supply services) to specified GCE units or certain aviation combat element (ACE) units as provided by combat logistics battalions and separate combat logistics companies, (2) provide general combat service support across the Marine Air Ground Task Force (MAGTF) by specialized service support battalions, including: dental, engineer support, maintenance, medical, supply and transportation support battalions, or (3) provide immediate command and control, and consolidated Navy personnel administration to subordinate LCE battalions and regiments by the Marine Logistics Group (MLG) headquarters and service battalion. Additionally, this battalion provides communications networking and law enforcement support across the LCE. The headquarters and service battalion also provides specialized services, including: military postal service, Marine Corps Exchange (MCX), and other personal services, to units of all four MAGTF elements (i.e., GCE, ACE, LCE, and CE).

==== Combat Logistics battalions ====
Combat logistics battalions (CLB) provide combat service support for the GCE and ACE beyond their organic capabilities. The battalions primarily provide motor transport and logistics control and materiel handling (i.e., landing support) services, and limited engineer, maintenance, and supply services, to dedicated Regimental Combat Teams (RCT) or Marine Expeditionary Units (MEU). CLBs that support RCTs typically consist of a headquarters and service company, and three support companies (engineer, maintenance, and transportation); those CLBs that support MEUs typically consist of several functional units (individual units may be styled as either a section, platoon, detachment, or company depending upon the size of unit, function, and the unit's parent battalion/regiment/group). In addition to a headquarters and service unit, these CLBs contain units dedicated to providing: air delivery, communications, engineer, explosive ordnance disposal, health services (medical and dental), landing support, law enforcement (military police), maintenance, motor transport, and supply support to the MEU.

Battalion Name	Insignia	Nickname	Location
Combat Logistics Battalion 1			Camp Pendleton, California
Combat Logistics Battalion 2		Keep Them Moving	Camp Lejeune, North Carolina
3d Littoral Logistics Battalion		Longboard	MCB Hawaii, Kaneohe Bay, Hawaii
Combat Logistics Battalion 4		The Supporting Edge	Camp Butler, Okinawa, Japan
Combat Logistics Battalion 5		Traveller	Camp Pendleton, California
Combat Logistics Battalion 6		Red Cloud Battalion	Camp Lejeune, North Carolina
Combat Logistics Battalion 7			MCAGCC Twentynine Palms, California
Combat Logistics Battalion 8		Anytime, Anyplace	Camp Lejeune, North Carolina
Combat Logistics Battalion 11			Camp Pendleton, California
12th Littoral Logistics Battalion			Camp Foster, Okinawa, Japan
Combat Logistics Battalion 13		Lucky	Camp Pendleton, California
Combat Logistics Battalion 15		Blackout	Camp Pendleton, California
Combat Logistics Battalion 22		Ironman	Camp Lejeune, North Carolina
Combat Logistics Battalion 23		Trucking Reservists	Joint Base Lewis-McChord, Washington
Combat Logistics Battalion 24		Blackbeard	Camp Lejeune, North Carolina
Combat Logistics Battalion 25			Red Bank, New Jersey
Combat Logistics Battalion 26			Camp Lejeune, North Carolina
Combat Logistics Battalion 31		Atlas Battalion	Camp Butler, Okinawa, Japan
Combat Logistics Battalion 451			Charlotte Naval and Marine Corps Reserve Center, North Carolina
Combat Logistics Battalion 453			Buckley Space Force Base Naval and Marine Corps Reserve Center, Colorado

==== Maintenance battalions ====
Maintenance battalions provide intermediate level (3d and 4th echelon) maintenance support for Marine Corps furnished (vice Navy, other service, or contractor provided) tactical ordnance (i.e., weapons and weapons systems), engineer, motor transport, communication-electronics, and general support (e.g., generators, refrigeration systems, water purification) equipment of the Marine Expeditionary Force (MEF). Maintenance battalions are usually organized with a headquarters and service company and five maintenance companies (electronic, engineer, general support, ordnance, and motor transport).

Battalion Name	Insignia	Nickname	Location
1st Maintenance Battalion		Midas	Camp Pendleton, California
2nd Maintenance Battalion		Sustinare Bellatore	Camp Lejeune, North Carolina
3rd Maintenance Battalion			Camp Butler, Okinawa, Japan
4th Maintenance Battalion			Charlotte, North Carolina

==== Engineer Support battalions ====
Engineer support battalions provide engineer support past the level available from organic engineers, such as combat bridging. ESBs also provide the storage and distribution of water and bulk fuels. Engineer support battalions usually consist of a headquarters and service company, three engineer companies, an engineer support company, a bridge company, a bulk fuel company, and an explosive ordnance disposal company.

Battalion Name	Insignia	Nickname	Location
6th Engineer Support Battalion			Portland, Oregon
7th Engineer Support Battalion		Pioneer	Camp Pendleton, California
8th Engineer Support Battalion			Camp Lejeune, North Carolina
9th Engineer Support Battalion		Team 9	Camp Hansen, Okinawa, Japan

==== Landing Support battalions ====
Landing support battalions support distributed maritime operations and expeditionary advanced base operations.

Battalion Name	Insignia	Nickname	Location
1st Landing Support Battalion		The Cutting Edge	Marine Corps Base Camp Pendleton, California
2d Landing Support Battalion			Marine Corps Base Camp Lejeune, North Carolina
3d Landing Support Battalion		Landers	Camp Foster, Okinawa

==== Supply battalions ====
Supply battalions provide supply support past that of organic unit supply. They provide all assets that a Marine unit might need, excepting fuels, water, and aviation repair parts provided from the Navy. Rations, repair parts, ammunition, personal equipment, and even entire end items are all provided by or through the supply battalions. Supply battalions usually consist of a headquarters and service company, an ammunition company, a medical logistics company, and a supply company.

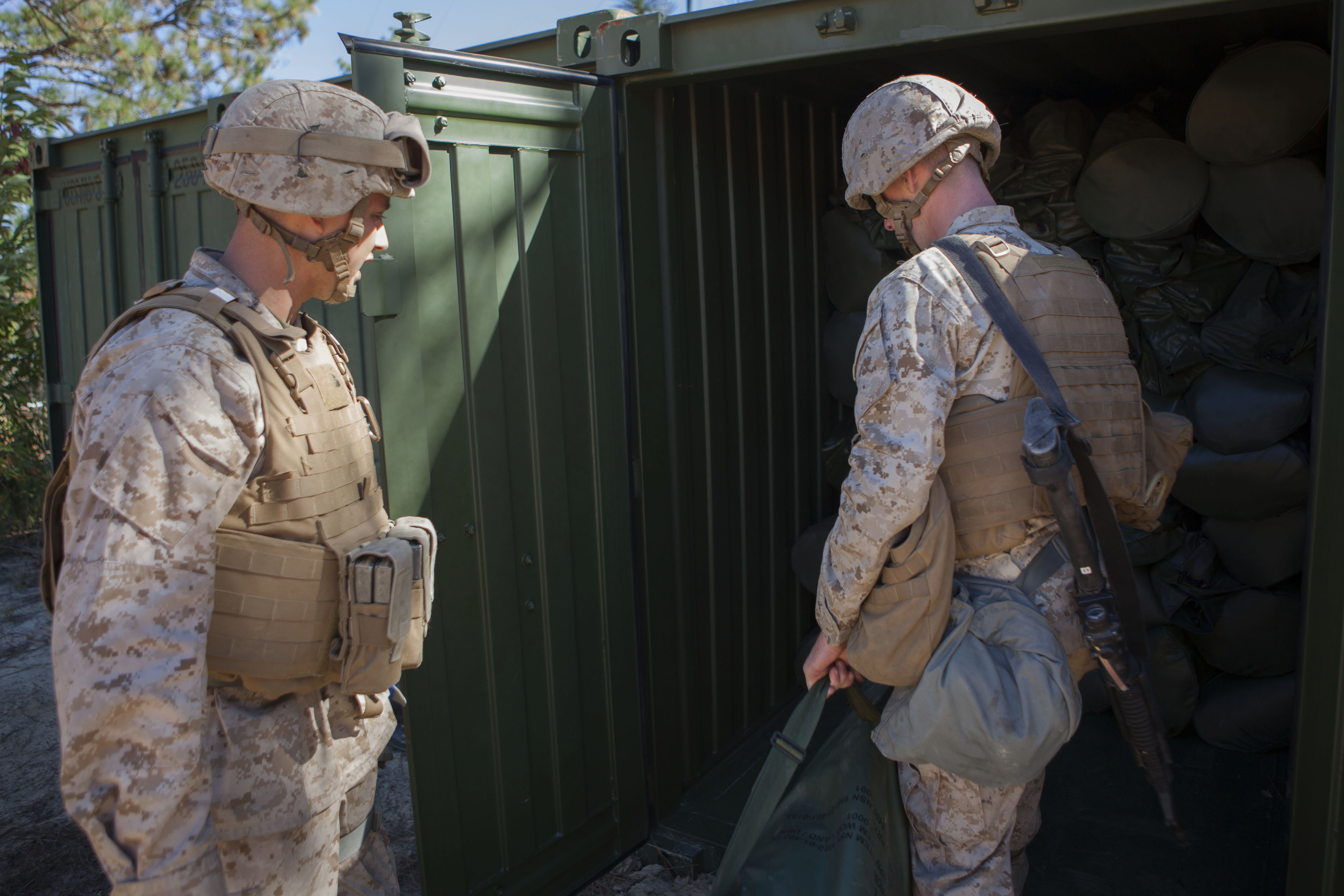
Marines provide logistical support

Battalion Name	Insignia	Nickname	Location
1st Supply Battalion		Dragon Warriors	Camp Pendleton, California
2nd Supply Battalion			Camp Lejeune, North Carolina
3rd Supply Battalion			Camp Butler, Okinawa, Japan
4th Supply Battalion			Newport News, Virginia

==== Transportation Support battalions ====
Transportation Support battalions provide the MEF with motor vehicle (truck) transportation and throughput support for the distribution of supplies, personnel, and equipment. The battalions consist of a headquarters and service company and three truck companies.

Battalion Name	Insignia	Nickname	Location
1st Transportation Support Battalion			Camp Pendleton, California
2d Transportation Support Battalion			Camp Lejeune, North Carolina

==== Medical battalions ====
Medical battalions provide medical care beyond the immediate care of unit corpsmen. Often, these units act as field hospitals when on deployment. In garrison, they supplement naval hospitals at various Marine Corps installations. Medical battalions are primarily composed of Navy Medical Corps personnel and typically consist of a headquarters and service company and three surgical companies.

Battalion Name	Insignia	Nickname	Location
1st Medical Battalion		Cheaters of Death	Camp Pendleton, California
2nd Medical Battalion			Camp Lejeune, North Carolina
3rd Medical Battalion			Camp Butler, Okinawa, Japan
4th Medical Battalion			San Diego, California

==== Dental battalions ====
Dental battalions are responsible for the oral health of Marines and Sailors within the MAGTF. On deployment, they can also be used to support field hospitals per Bureau of Medicine and Surgery Instruction, when not performing dental roles. In garrison, they run dental health clinics at various Marine installations. Dental battalions are primarily composed of Navy Dental Corps personnel and usually consist of a headquarters and service company and three dental companies.

Battalion Name	Insignia	Nickname	Location
1st Dental Battalion			Camp Pendleton, California
2nd Dental Battalion			Camp Lejeune, North Carolina
3rd Dental Battalion			Camp Butler, Okinawa, Japan
4th Dental Battalion			Navy Operational Support Center Atlanta, Dobbins ARB, Georgia

==== Headquarters and Support battalion ====
(The former H&S battalions of the 1st, 2nd, and 3rd MLGs—previously designated as Combat Logistics Regiments 17, 27, and 37, respectively—are now designated as "Headquarters Regiments") Headquarters and Service battalion provides command and control, administration, communications, security, food service and data processing support to the Marine Logistics Group (MLG) and supporting services to the Marine Expeditionary Force (MEF) or two Marine Expeditionary Brigades (MEB) and MEF residual forces in expeditionary/amphibious operations and subsequent operations ashore. Support includes data processing, financial disbursing, postal, legal, Marine Corps Exchange (MCX) and consolidated Navy personnel administration to the MLG. The battalion typically consists of headquarters company, communications company, military police company, and service company.

Battalion Name	Insignia	Nickname	Location
Headquarters & Service Battalion (Redesignated as Headquarters Regiment); 1st Marine Logistics Group			Camp Pendleton, California
Headquarters & Service Battalion (Redesignated as Headquarters Regiment; 2nd Marine Logistics Group			Camp Lejeune, North Carolina
Headquarters & Service Battalion (Redesignated as Headquarters Regiment); 3rd Marine Logistics Group			Camp Butler, Okinawa, Japan
Headquarters & Service Battalion; 4th Marine Logistics Group			Marietta, Georgia

=== Command Element units ===
The command element (CE) consists of those command and control, communications, intelligence, law enforcement, electronic warfare/signals intelligence/electronic intelligence, civil affairs, air/naval gunfire liaison, and force reconnaissance units that enable the MAGTF commander to effectively fight the GCE and ACE, with support from the LCE, to defeat the enemy and/or accomplish other assigned missions.

Note: U.S. Marine Corps organizational doctrine places communications, intelligence, and law enforcement battalions and their organic companies/detachments in the MAGTF headquarters group or CE. However, intelligence (i.e., ground intelligence) may also be considered as a GCE function (primarily located in the infantry battalion scout/sniper platoon) and communications and law enforcement may also be considered as logistics functions. Most GCE battalions and regiments, and ACE squadrons/battalions (LAAD), Marine aircraft groups (MAGs), and Marine air control groups (MACGs), contain some organic communications assets such as battalion and regimental communications platoons, MARDIV and MLG communications companies, and Marine wing communications squadrons. In addition, MARDIVs, Marine Aircraft Wings (MAWs), and MLGs also possess a limited organic law enforcement capability.

==== Communications battalions ====
Communications battalions provide communication support for the MAGTF as part of the MEF headquarters groups. They also perform networking and data services when deployed. The battalions typically consist of a headquarters and service company, three communications companies, and a support (maintenance) company.

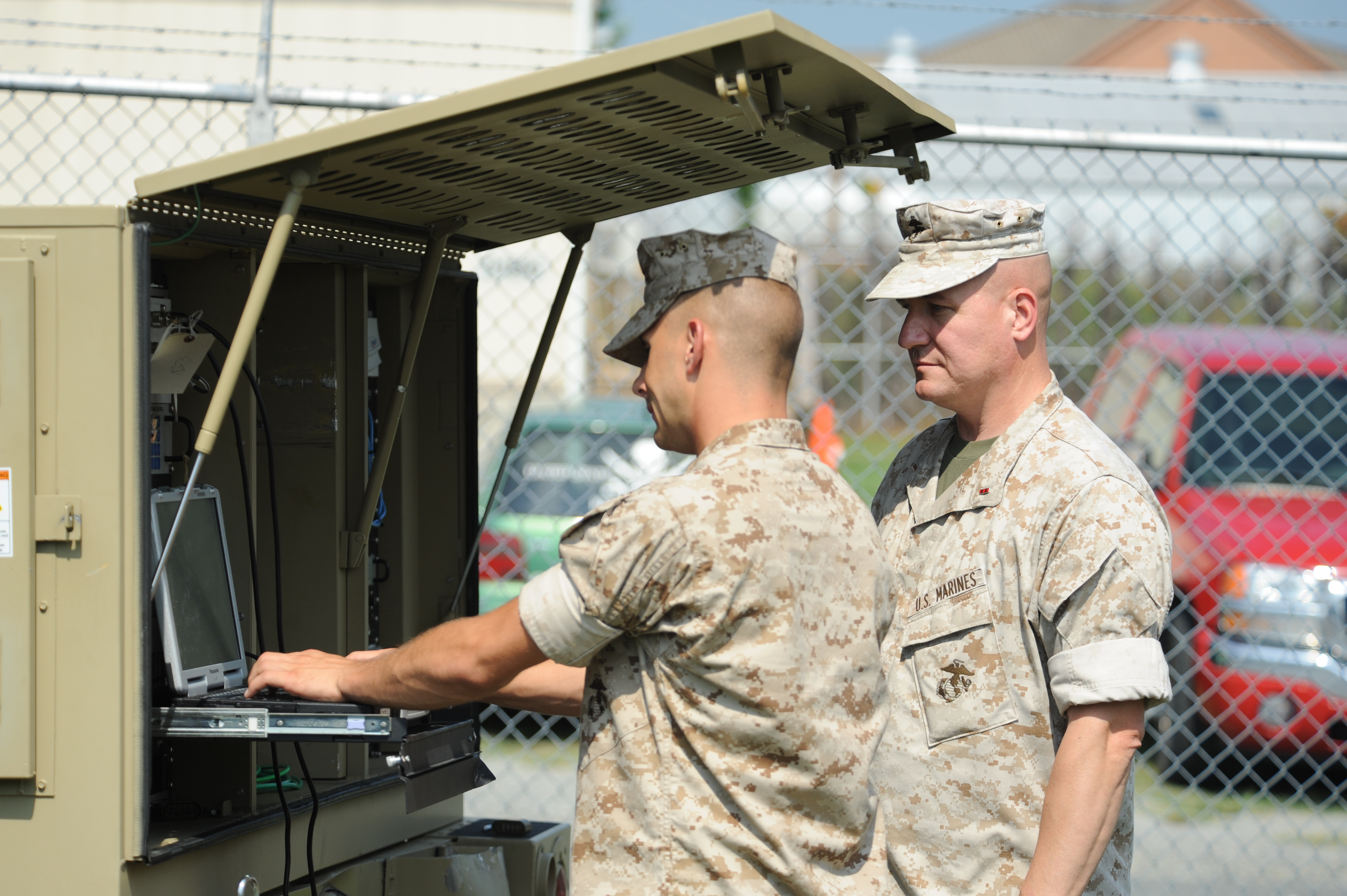
Ground mobile forces operator

Battalion Name	Insignia	Nickname	Location
6th Communications Battalion			Brooklyn, New York
7th Communications Battalion			Camp Hansen, Okinawa, Japan
8th Communications Battalion		8th Crime	Camp Lejeune, North Carolina
9th Communications Battalion		9th Crime	Camp Pendleton, California

==== Intelligence battalions ====
Intelligence battalions, attached to MEF headquarters groups, are to plan and direct, collect, process, produce and disseminate intelligence, and provide counterintelligence support. In addition to a headquarters and service company, the battalions consist of two to four military intelligence companies that perform battlefield surveillance, production and analysis, and counterintelligence/human intelligence.

Battalion Name	Insignia	Nickname	Location
1st Intelligence Battalion			Camp Pendleton, California
2nd Intelligence Battalion			Camp Lejeune, North Carolina
3rd Intelligence Battalion			Camp Hansen, Okinawa, Japan
Intelligence Support Battalion			New Orleans, Louisiana

==== Law Enforcement battalions ====
The LE battalions will be a force multiplier to the operating forces forward deployed by assisting in an array of missions from law enforcement, route regulation, humanitarian assistance, nonlethal weapons training, and military working dog employment. Each included "500 military police officers [sic] and dozens of dogs." (Note: As military units, each battalion contains only about 30 to 40 "officers," as the majority of the military police Marines are enlisted members and not officers. "Officers" as in any military organization, command the battalion and its organic companies and platoons and serve as staff officers in the battalion headquarters.) By 2030 all of the battalions will be disbanded following the re-organisation announcement.

Battalion Name	Insignia	Location
4th Law Enforcement Battalion		St. Paul, Minnesota

==== Radio battalions ====
Radio battalions provide the MEF with tactical electronic warfare, as well as signals intelligence and electronic intelligence. The battalions consist of a headquarters and service company and three operations companies.

Battalion Name	Insignia	Nickname	Location
1st Radio Battalion			Camp Pendleton, California
2nd Radio Battalion		America's Radio Battalion	Camp Lejeune, North Carolina
3rd Radio Battalion			Marine Corps Base Hawaii, Hawaii

==== Network Battalions ====
Marine Corps network battalions are responsible for providing all aspects of security, operations, and protection for Department of Defense Information Networks from the enterprise at the service level, down to each individual warfighter.

Battalion Name	Insignia	Nickname	Location	Note
1st Network Battalion			Marine Corps Base Camp Pendleton, CA	
2d Network Battalion			Marine Corps Base Camp Lejeune, NC	
3d Network Battalion			Marine Corps Base Camp Smedley D. Butler	

==== Civil Affairs groups ====
Civil Affairs groups provide the capability to plan and execute civil military operations while serving as the liaison between military forces and civil authorities, the local population and non-governmental organizations. The groups conduct activities which enhance the relationship between the military and host nation personnel and organizations facilitated through application of civil affairs specialty skills in areas normally the responsibility of civil governments.

Group Name	Insignia	Nickname	Location
1st Civil Affairs Group			Marine Corps Base Camp Pendleton, California
2nd Civil Affairs Group			Joint Base Anacostia-Bolling, Washington, D.C.
3rd Civil Affairs Group			Naval Station Great Lakes, Illinois
4th Civil Affairs Group			Hialeah, Florida

==== Other units ====
While these units are designated as companies, they are commanded by a Lt. Col. who is assisted by an executive officer and an executive staff (S-1, S-2, etc.). The company's organic platoons often operate independently and are normally commanded by a major (ANGLICO) or captain (FORECON).

Air Naval Gunfire Liaison companies (ANGLICO) provide Marine Air-Ground Task Force (MAGTF) commanders a liaison capability, with foreign area expertise, to plan, coordinate, and conduct terminal control of fires in support of joint, allied, and coalition forces. ANGLICO units are separate companies (i.e., not organic to a battalion or regiment) reporting directly to one of the three MEF HQ Groups (1st, 2nd, & 5th ANGLICO) or the Forces HQ Group, Marine Forces Reserve (3rd, 4th, and 6th ANGLICO).

Fleet Marine Force Reconnaissance (FORECON) companies provide Marine Air-Ground Task Force (MAGTF) commanders with deep reconnaissance and direct action capability. The FORECON companies of the three MEFs are organic to their respective divisional reconnaissance battalions and are under operational control of their parent MEF HQ Group. The 3rd FORECON company are separate company reporting directly to the Forces HQ Group, Marine Forces Reserve and are dedicated to supporting the MEF's whenever the MEF's active duty FORECON company is not available.

Unit Type	Insignia	Nickname
Air Naval Gunfire Liaison Companies (6)		ANGLICO
Fleet Marine Force Reconnaissance Companies (4)		Force Recon

=== Other battalions ===
With the exception of the Low Altitude Air Defense battalions, which are organic to the Marine Air Control Group (MACG) of a Marine Aircraft Wing (MAW), and are a component of the Aviation Combat Element (ACE) of a Marine Air Ground Task Force (MAGTF), the battalions in this section perform missions either within the Operating Forces of the Marine Corps but outside the MAGTF structure, or within the Supporting Establishment.

==== Marine Raider battalions ====
The Marine Raider battalions of the Marine Raider regiment provide the principal special operations combat capability of the Marine Corps Forces Special Operations Command in performing direct action, special reconnaissance, counter-terrorism, information operations, foreign internal defense, and unconventional warfare missions. The battalions consist of a headquarters and service company and four special operations companies.

Battalion Name	Insignia	Nickname	Location
1st Marine Raider Battalion			Camp Pendleton, California
2nd Marine Raider Battalion			Camp Lejeune, North Carolina
3rd Marine Raider Battalion			Camp Lejeune, North Carolina

==== Special Mission battalions and battalion equivalent organizations ====
These battalions and organizations perform a wide range of specialized missions including: (1) CBRNE Consequence Management, (2) interior security of United States diplomatic posts to provide protection for classified information and equipment vital to U.S. national security, (3) Signals Intelligence, Information Assurance, and National-Tactical Integration activities, (4) physical security of naval nuclear vessels and weapons, (5) special operations intelligence support, and (6) special operations administrative, logistics, communications, EOD, Military Working Dog, and other operations support.

Battalion Name	Insignia	Nickname	Location
(1) Chemical Biological Incident Response Force		The 'Birf	Naval Support Facility Indian Head, Maryland
(2) Marine Corps Embassy Security Group		Marine Security Guards	Marine Corps Base Quantico, Virginia
(3) Marine Cryptologic Support Battalion		MCSB	Fort Meade, Maryland
(4) Marine Security Forces Battalion, Kings Bay		Gunslingers	Naval Submarine Base Kings Bay, Georgia
(4) Marine Corps Security Forces Battalion Bangor		Bangor Marines	Naval Base Kitsap, Washington
(5) Marine Special Operations Intelligence Battalion		MSOIB	Camp Lejeune, North Carolina
(6) Marine Raider Support Battalions (3)		MRSG	Camp Lejeune, North Carolina

==== Specialized Training battalions ====
These battalions provide advanced training (i.e., beyond the scope of initial training provided by the Recruit Training battalions, Officer Candidates School, or other pre-commissioning programs (e.g., US Naval Academy). The scope of training provided includes: (1) Training and educating newly commissioned or appointed officers ... with particular emphasis on the duties, responsibilities and warfighting skills required of a rifle platoon commander, (2) Military Occupation Specialty (MOS) training, and (3) individual and crew-served weapons and fieldcraft training for new Marines.

Battalion Name	Insignia	Nickname	Location
(1) The Basic School's Instructor Battalion		CRF	Marine Corps Base Quantico, Virginia
(2) Assault Amphibian School Battalion			Marine Corps Base Camp Pendleton, California
(2) Communication Training Battalion			Marine Corps Air Ground Combat Center, Twentynine Palms, California
(2) Marine Corps Engineer School			Camp Lejeune, North Carolina
(3) Weapons & Field Training Battalion			Camp Pendleton, California
(3) Weapons Training Battalion			Marine Corps Base Quantico, Virginia
(3) Weapons & Field Training Battalion			Marine Corps Recruit Depot Parris Island, South Carolina

==== Recruit Training battalions ====
Provide reception, processing, and recruit training for enlisted personnel following initial entry into the Marine Corps. Provide training for Drill Instructors and officers entrusted with recruit training responsibilities. Recruit training battalions consist of a headquarters and service company and four recruit training companies.

Only the Marine Corps Recruit Depot Parris Island logos are listed below but only Recruit Training battalions Marine Corps Recruit Depot San Diego wikis show. The logos for Marine Corps Recruit Depot San Diego differ slightlys.

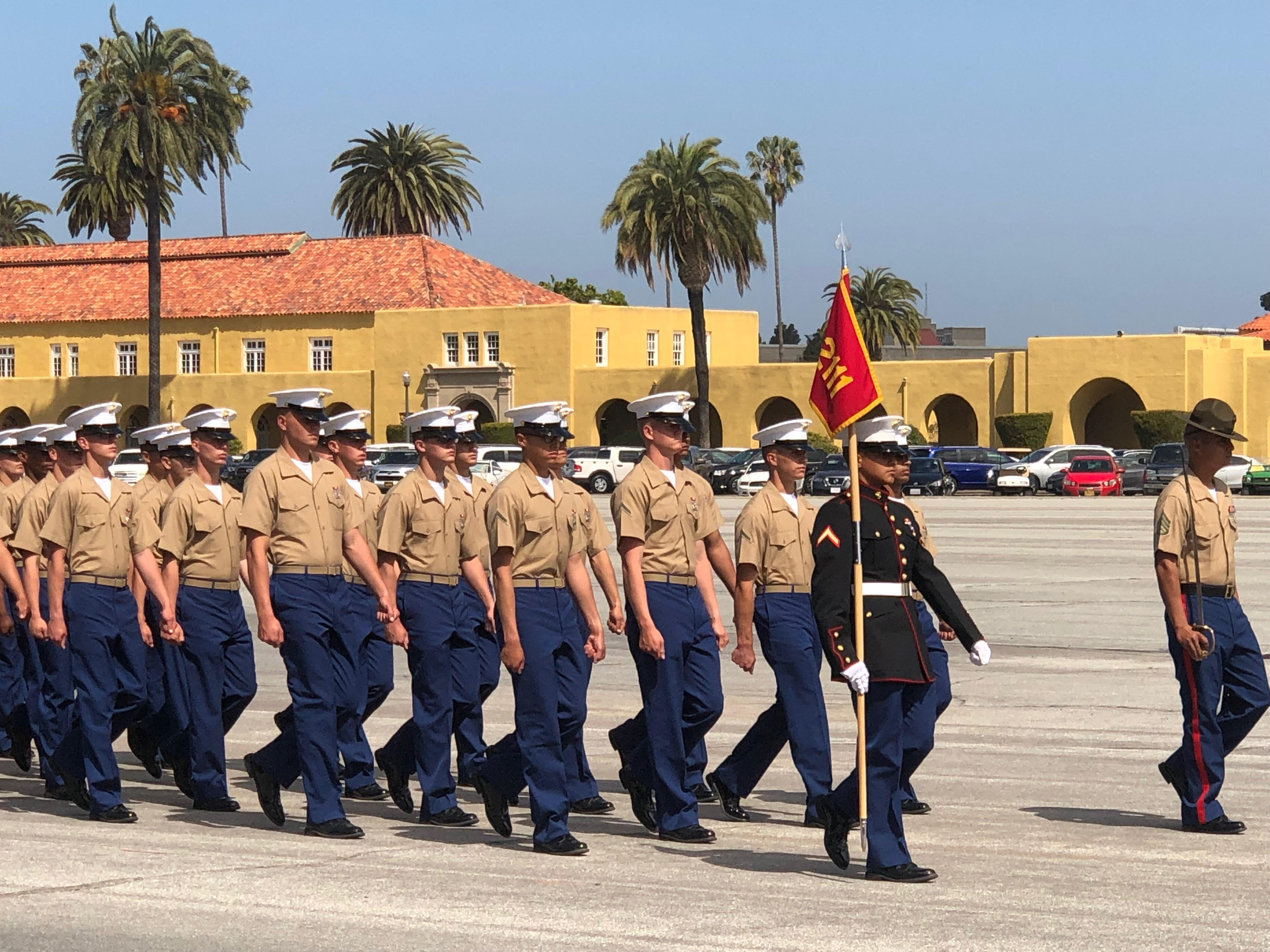
Marines graduation ceremony

Battalion Name	Insignia	Nickname	Locations
1st Recruit Training Battalion		Big Red One	Marine Corps Recruit Depots Parris Island, South Carolina and San Diego, California
2nd Recruit Training Battalion		Second to None	Marine Corps Recruit Depots Parris Island, South Carolina and San Diego, California
3rd Recruit Training Battalion		Thundering Third	Marine Corps Recruit Depots Parris Island, South Carolina and San Diego, California

== Disbanded units ==
=== Infantry battalions ===
Battalion Name	Insignia	Nickname
2nd Battalion, 3rd Marines		Island Warriors
3rd Battalion, 3rd Marines		America's Battalion
3rd Battalion, 8th Marines		The Commandant's Battalion
1st Battalion, 9th Marines		The Walking Dead
2nd Battalion, 9th Marines		Hell in a Helmet
3rd Battalion, 9th Marines		Shadow Warriors
1st Battalion, 13th Marines		
2nd Battalion, 13th Marines		
3rd Battalion, 13th Marines		
4th Battalion, 13th Marines		
1st Battalion, 15th Marines		
2nd Battalion, 15th Marines		
3rd Battalion, 15th Marines		
4th Battalion, 15th Marines		
1st Battalion, 22nd Marines		
2nd Battalion, 22nd Marines		
3rd Battalion, 22nd Marines		
3d Battalion, 24th Marines		
1st Battalion, 26th Marines		The Professionals
2nd Battalion, 26th Marines		
3rd Battalion, 26th Marines		Path-Finders
1st Battalion, 27th Marines		
2nd Battalion, 27th Marines		
3rd Battalion, 27th Marines		
1st Battalion, 28th Marines		
2nd Battalion, 28th Marines		
3rd Battalion, 28th Marines		
1st Battalion, 29th Marines		
2nd Battalion, 29th Marines		
3rd Battalion, 29th Marines		

=== Marine defense battalions ===
Battalion Name	Insignia	Nickname
2d Defense Battalion		
4th Defense Battalion		
5th Defense Battalion		
6th Defense Battalion		
7th Defense Battalion		
8th Defense Battalion		
9th Defense Battalion		Fighting Ninth
10th Defense Battalion		
11th Defense Battalion		
12th Defense Battalion		
13th Defense Battalion		
14th Defense Battalion		Five: Fourteenth
15th Defense Battalion		First: Fifteenth
16th Defense Battalion		
17th Defense Battalion		Two: Seventeen
18th Defense Battalion		
51st Defense Battalion		
52nd Defense Battalion		

=== 1st Marine Parachute Regiment ===
Battalion Name	Insignia	Nickname
1st Parachute Battalion		
2nd Parachute Battalion		
3rd Parachute Battalion		

=== 1st Marine Raider Regiment ===
Battalion Name	Insignia	Nickname
1st Marine Raider Battalion		Edson's Raiders
2nd Marine Raider Battalion		Carlson's Raiders
3rd Marine Raider Battalion		
4th Marine Raider Battalion		

=== Tank battalions ===
Battalion Name	Insignia	Nickname
1st Tank Battalion		1st Tanks
2nd Tank Battalion		2nd Tanks
3rd Tank Battalion		3rd Tanks
4th Tank Battalion		4th Tanks
5th Tank Battalion		Iron Nickels
6th Tank Battalion		"The Iron Sixth"
8th Tank Battalion		Whispering Death

=== Amphibian Tractor battalions ===
Battalion Name	Insignia	Nickname
5th Amphibian Tractor Battalion		
6th Amphibian Tractor Battalion		
8th Amphibian Tractor Battalion		
9th Amphibian Tractor Battalion		
11th Amphibian Tractor Battalion		

=== Armored Amphibian Tractor battalions ===
Battalion Name	Insignia	Nickname
1st Armored Amphibian Battalion		
2nd Armored Amphibian Battalion		
3rd Armored Amphibian Battalion		

=== Other battalions ===
Battalion Name	Insignia	Nickname
Headquarters Battalion 5th Marine Division		
5th Engineer Battalion		
5th Pioneer Battalion		
5th Service Battalion		
5th Motor Transportation Battalion		
5th Medical Battalion		
5th Joint Assault Signal Battalion		
2nd Armored Amphibian Tractor Battalion		
3rd Armored Tractor Battalion		
5th Battalion, 11th Marines		Steel Rain
5th Reconnaissance Battalion		
Headquarters Battalion 6th Marine Division		
6th Engineer Battalion		
6th Pioneer Battalion		
6th Service Battalion		
6th Medical Battalion		
6th Motor Transport Battalion		
Anti-Terrorism Battalion		
Combat Logistics Battalion 46		
1st Anti-Tank Battalion		Ontos
3rd Anti-Tank Battalion		Sturm und Drang
3rd Combat Engineer Battalion		Demolition is the Mission
Combat Assault Battalion		The Iron Fist
4th Battalion, 10th Marines		Fighting 4th
2nd Battalion, 12th Marines		The Thundering Guns of Death
4th Battalion, 12th Marines		Hell's Hammers
6th Machine Gun Battalion		
6th Motor Transport Battalion		
6th Reconnaissance Battalion		
11th Engineer Battalion		Construction Destruction
11th Motor Transport Battalion		Rolling 11th
19th Battalion		
1st Law Enforcement Battalion		
2nd Law Enforcement Battalion		
3rd Law Enforcement Battalion		
MCSOCOM Detachment One		

== See also ==
- Ground combat element
  - List of United States Marine Corps divisions
  - List of United States Marine Corps ground combat element regiments
  - List of vehicles of the United States Marine Corps
  - List of weapons of the U.S. Marine Corps
- Logistics combat element
  - List of United States Marine Corps logistics groups
  - List of United States Marine Corps logistics regiments
  - List of United States Marine Corps Combat Logistics Companies
- Aviation Combat Element
  - List of United States Marine Corps aircraft wings
  - List of United States Marine Corps aircraft groups
  - List of United States Marine Corps air control groups
  - List of United States Marine Corps aircraft squadrons
  - List of United States Marine Corps aviation support units
