= 4th Supply Battalion =

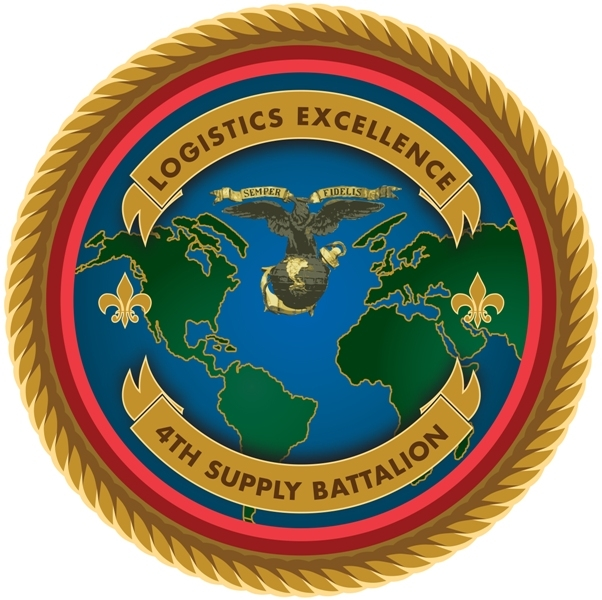
- 4th Supply Battalion insignia
- Country: United States
- Branch: USMC
- Part of: 4th Marine Logistics Group; Marine Forces Reserve
- Mottos: "Logistics Excellence", "Make it Happen"

Commanders
- Current commander: Colonel Robert M. Montgomery

The 4th Supply Battalion was a battalion of the United States Marine Corps Reserve that specialized in distributing and warehousing military goods and equipment. Headquartered in Newport News, Virginia, they fell under the command of the 4th Marine Logistics Group and Marine Forces Reserve.

== Subordinate units ==
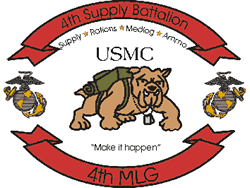
old unit logo

- Headquarters and Service Company, Newport News, Virginia
- Medical Logistics Company, Charleston, South Carolina
- Ammunition Company, Greenville, South Carolina
  - Detachment 1, Ammunition Company, Rome, Georgia
- General Support Company, Topeka, Kansas
- Supply Company, Raleigh, North Carolina
  - Detachment 1, Supply Company, Albany, Georgia
- Rations Company, Washington, D.C.

== Mission ==
To field, train, and provide qualified supply augmentees and capabilities to the active component; to serve as a Combat Logistics Regiment (CLR) headquarters when tasked; to serve as the force intermediate supply activity for designated classes of supply.

== History ==
Activated 20 March 1952 at Norfolk, Virginia as 1st Depot Supply Battalion, U.S. Marine Corps Reserve.

Redesignated 1 November 1959 as 3D Service Battalion, U.S. Marine Corps Reserve.

Redesignated 1 February 1961 as 1st Combat Service Support Battalion, U.S. Marine Corps Reserve.

Redesignated 1 July 1962 as Material Supply and Maintenance Battalion, 4th Force Service Regiment, Force Troops, Fleet Marine Force, U.S. Marine Corps Reserve.

Redesignated 1 July 1965 as Supply Battalion, 4th Force Service Regiment.

Relocated during October 1971 to Newport News, Virginia.

Redesignated 17 May 1976 as 4th Supply Battalion, 4th Force Service Support Group.

Participated in support of Operations Desert Shield and Desert Storm, Southwest Asia, December 1990 – February 1991.

Mobilized and Deployed to Camp Pendleton, California in support of Operations Enduring Freedom and Iraqi Freedom, Iraq February – September 2003.

== See also ==
- History of the United States Marine Corps
- List of United States Marine Corps battalions
