= 4th Medical Battalion =

4th Medical Battalion may refer to:

- 4th Medical Battalion (United States Army), a unit with the 4th Infantry Division (United States) in World War II
- 4th Medical Battalion (United States Marine Corps), a unit that provides medical support to United States Marine Corps forces
