= 2nd Transportation Support Battalion =

2d Transportation Support Battalion
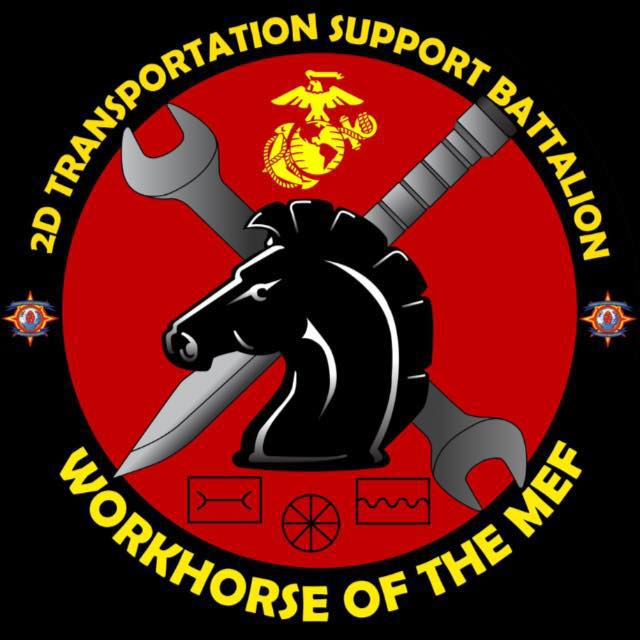
- Active: 11 Dec 1950 - 30 Mar 2000 1 Oct 2014 - present
- Country: United States of America
- Branch: United States Marine Corps
- Type: Combat Logistics
- Role: Provide General Support Combat Logistics Support to II MEF
- Part of: Combat Logistics Regiment 2; 2nd Marine Logistics Group
- Garrison/HQ: MCB Camp Lejeune, North Carolina
- Engagements: Gulf War

Commanders
- Current commander: LtCol Randall D. White

2d Transportation Support Battalion is a logistics unit of the United States Marine Corps that is based at Marine Corps Base Camp Lejeune, North Carolina. The battalion falls under the command of Combat Logistics Regiment 2 and the 2nd Marine Logistics Group. The battalion was reactivated October 1, 2014.

== Mission ==
Provide transportation and throughput support for the II Marine Expeditionary Force to facilitate the distribution of personnel, equipment, and supplies by air, ground, and sea to provide the MEF transportation and throughput support for the distribution of supplies, personnel, and equipment.

== Subordinate units ==
- Headquarters and Service Company
- Landing Support Company
- Motor Transport Company
- Support Company

== History ==
=== 1950-1991 ===
8th Motor Transport Battalion was activated December 11, 1950 at MCB Camp Lejeune, North Carolina and was assigned to Service Command, Fleet Marine Force, Atlantic. The battalion was detached from Service Command during July 1956 assigned directly to Fleet Marine Force, Atlantic.In August 1960 it was again reassigned to Force Troops, Fleet Marine Force, Atlantic. On December 1, 1975, was transferred under the command of the newly formed 2d Force Service Support Group (2d FSSG). In October 1989. elements of the battalion participated in humanitarian assistance and disaster relief efforts in the Southeastern United States in response to Hurricane Hugo during September–October 1989. The battalion deployed to Saudi Arabia in December 1990. It supported combat operations during the Gulf War and returned to the United States is April 1991.

=== 1992–Present ===
In August–September 1992 elements of the battalion participated in humanitarian assistance and disaster relief efforts in Florida after Hurricane Andrew. From September 1994 through March 1995 the battalion supported Operation Uphold Democracy in Haiti, September 1994- March 1995. During November and December 1998 the battalion again supported disaster relief efforts following a hurricane when it deployed to Honduras following Hurricane Mitch. 8th Motor Transport Battalion was deactivated on March 30, 2000.

=== Reactivation and current operations ===
2d Transportation Support Battalion was reactivated on October 1, 2014, at MCB Camp Lejeune, North Carolina and assigned to Combat Logistics Regiment 2 and the 2d Marine Logistics Group. The newly formed battalion combines the capabilities formerly found in the 2d Landing Support Battalion and 8th Motor Transport Battalion. 2d TSB maintains 8th Motor Transport Battalion's Lineage and Honors. Since then, the battalion has regularly provided motor transport companies, landing support platoons, and heavy equipment capabilities throughout the II Marine Expeditionary Force.

== Unit awards ==
A unit citation or commendation is an award bestowed upon an organization for the action cited. Members of the unit who participated in said actions are allowed to wear on their uniforms the awarded unit citation. 2d TSB has been presented with the following awards: .

Streamer	Award	Year(s)	Additional Info
	Navy Unit Commendation Streamer	1990-91	Gulf War
	National Defense Service Streamer with three Bronze Stars	1951–1954, 1961–1974, 1990–1995, 2001–present	Korean War, Vietnam War, Gulf War, war on terrorism
	Southwest Asia Service Streamer with three Bronze Stars	1990-91	Gulf War
A blue streamer with yellow, red, and white horizontal stripes	Global War on Terrorism Service Streamer	2001–present	

2d Transportation Support Battalion also received the 2017 National Defense Transportation Association Military Unit Award:

"From 1 January 2016 to 31 December 2016, 2d Transportation Support Battalion consistently provided responsive and effective transportation and logistical support to units, exercises, and operations across the II Marine Expeditionary Force. 2d Transportation Support Battalion’s efforts were critical to the work-up and deployment of numerous units, while simultaneously distributing essential supplies to units and organizations across Camp Lejeune; Consistently excelling in its missions while overcoming a host of equipment and manpower challenges. In addition to providing a critical distribution capabilities for II MEF supply chains, 2d TSB consistently provided augmentation to support exercises and unit deployments. The support provided by 2d TSB filled critical roles in the concept of logistics for those exercises and was essential to the SPMAGTF-CR and 22nd MEU missions. In addition to the highly effective and responsive logistical support provided, 2d TSB also played key leadership roles in developing enterprise solutions to enhance air cargo movements and ground mobility in Cold weather environments. 2d TSB’s impact on Marine distribution capabilities was exceptional and worthy of the 2017 National Defense Transportation Association military unit award."

== See also ==
- List of United States Marine Corps battalions
- Organization of the United States Marine Corps
