= 4th Maintenance Battalion =

- 4th Maintenance Battalion insignia
- Country: United States
- Branch: USMC
- Role: Combat service support
- Part of: 4th Marine Logistics Group
- Garrison/HQ: New Orleans, Louisiana
- Motto(s): Sustaining Power for the Force

The 4th Maintenance Battalion was a battalion of the United States Marine Corps Reserve that provided intermediate-level maintenance for the Marine Reserve's tactical ordnance, engineer, motor transport, communications electronics and general support ground equipment. They were headquartered in New Orleans, Louisiana with subordinate units throughout the United States. They fell under the command of 4th Marine Logistics Group. As part of the 2010 Force Structure Review Group, 4th Maintenance Battalion was reorganized into Combat Logistics Battalion 451 and Combat Logistics Battalion 453.

== Mission ==
Provide general support and intermediate (3rd and 4th echelon) maintenance support for Marine Corps furnished tactical ordnance, engineer, motor transport, communications electronics, and general support ground equipment. The Battalion is structured to provide command and control for centralized coordination and decentralized execution of maintenance efforts to sustain combat power. Subordinate Elements are organized along functional area lines to provide maintenance support in commodity areas that are critical to Marine Forces Reserve's war fighting capability.

== Subordinate units ==
- Headquarters And Service Company (HSC) Charlotte, North Carolina
- Electronic Equipment Maintenance Company (EEMC) – Wichita, Kansas
  - Detachment 1, Electronic Equipment Maintenance Company (1-EEMC) – Greensboro, North Carolina
  - Detachment 2, Electronic Equipment Maintenance Company (2-EEMC) – Indianapolis, Indiana
- Engineer Equipment Maintenance Company (EEMC) – Omaha, Nebraska
- General Support Maintenance Company (GSMC) – Rock Island, Illinois
- Motor Transport Maintenance Company (MTMC) – 4th Maintenance Battalion – Sacramento, California
  - Detachment 1, Motor Transport Maintenance Company (1-MTMC) – Abilene, Texas
  - Detachment 2, Motor Transport Maintenance Company (2-MTMC) – Augusta, Georgia
  - Detachment 3, Motor Transport Maintenance Company (3-MTMC) – Allentown, Pennsylvania
- Ordnance Maintenance Company (OMC) – Waco, Texas
- Ordnance Contact Team 1 (OCT 1) – Fort Devens

== See also ==
- History of the United States Marine Corps
- List of United States Marine Corps battalions
