= 6th Engineer Support Battalion =

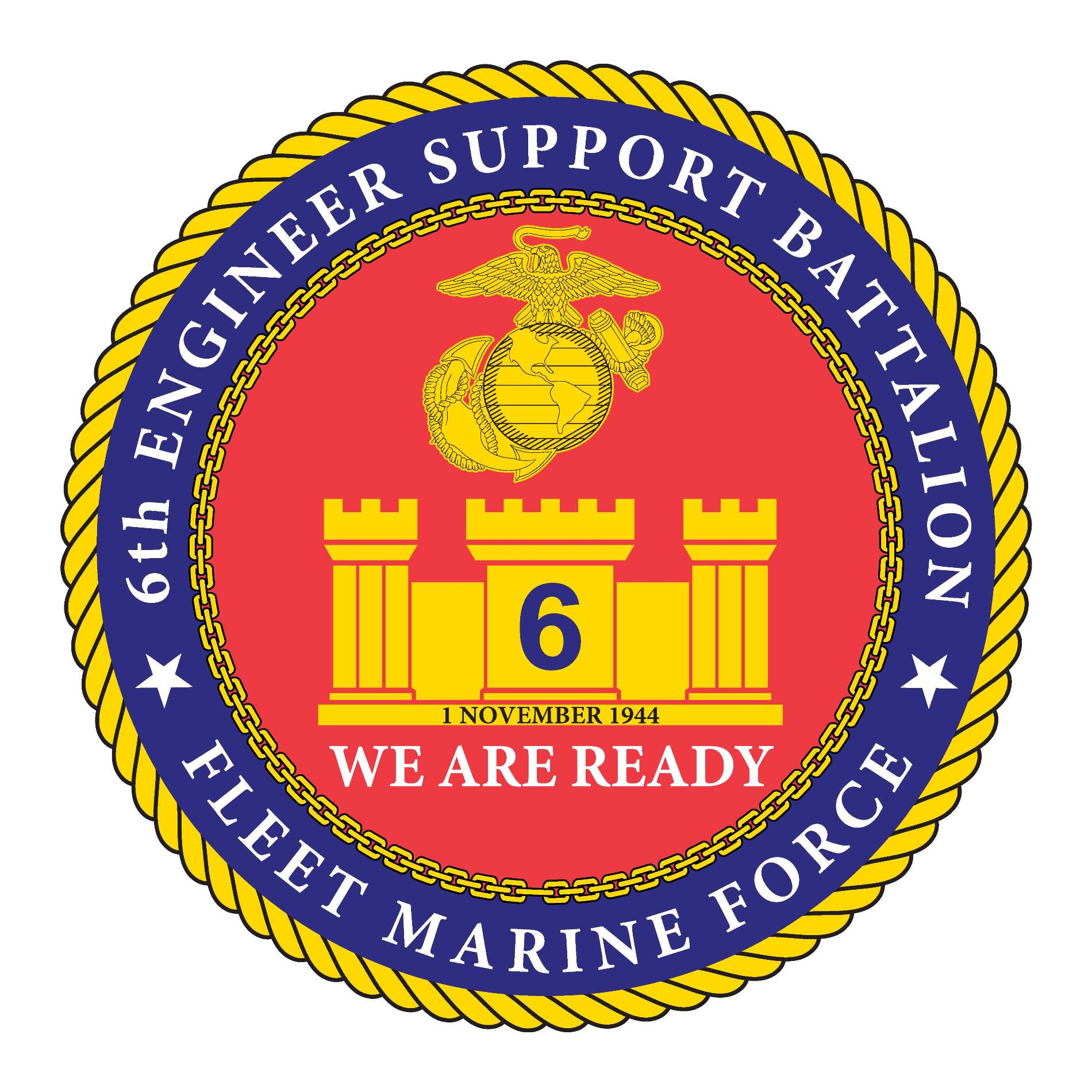
- Active: 1 November 1944 – 26 March 1946; 1 November 1957 – present
- Country: United States
- Allegiance: United States of America
- Branch: United States Marine Corps
- Type: Engineering battalion
- Part of: 4th Marine Logistics Group; Marine Forces Reserve
- Motto: "We Are Ready"
- Engagements: World War II * Battle of Okinawa; Korean War * Battle of Inchon; Operation Desert Storm; Operation Iraqi Freedom; Operation Enduring Freedom

The 6th Engineer Support Battalion (6th ESB or 6th EngSptBn), is an engineering battalion of the United States Marine Corps Reserve. The battalion is headquartered in Portland, Oregon, and falls under the command of the 4th Marine Logistics Group.

== Organization ==
- Headquarters and Service Company, in Portland, (Oregon)
- Bulk Fuel Company A, in Tucson, Arizona
  - Detachment 1, in Fort Lewis, Washington
  - Detachment 2, in Bakersfield, California
- Bulk Fuel Company B, in Wilmington, Delaware
  - Detachment 1, in Green Bay, Wisconsin
- Bulk Fuel Company C, at Luke Air Force Base, Arizona
- Engineer Company A, in Springfield, (Oregon)
- Engineer Company C, in Millington, Tennessee
- Engineer Support Company, in Battle Creek, Michigan

Disbanded companies:

- Bridge Company A, in Battle Creek, Michigan
- Bridge Company B, in Folsom, Pennsylvania
- Bridge Company C, in Millington, Tennessee

== History ==
=== World War II ===
The Battalion was activated on 1 November 1944 at Guadalcanal as the 6th Engineer Battalion, 6th Marine Division. During World War II, they participated in the Battle of Okinawa and the Occupation of Japan (August–November 1945). In October 1945, they were redeployed to Qingdao, China. The battalion was deactivated 26 March 1946.

=== 1957–1975 ===
The Battalion was reactivated on 1 November 1957 at Swan Island, Portland, Oregon as the 3rd Engineer Battalion of the Marine Corps Reserve. On 1 July 1962, they were redesignated as the 5th Engineer Battalion.

=== 1976–1997 ===
Redesignated again on 31 May 1976 as the 6th Engineer Support Battalion (6th ESB), 4th Force Service Support Group. Elements of the battalion participated in Operation Desert Shield and Operation Desert Storm in Southwest Asia from January until April 1991.

=== Operation Iraqi Freedom ===
==== 2003 ====
In Operation Iraqi Freedom, 6th ESB was responsible for fueling coalition forces as they moved northward through Iraq, and were entrenched in combat during the Battle of Nasiriyah. They also provided purified water supplies to the Marine Corps desert and urban encampments during Operation Iraqi Freedom. During Iraq's worst sandstorm in 20 years, Reserve Marines of the 6th ESB, along with active duty Marines of 7th ESB and 8th ESB Bulk Fuel Companies, constructed the longest fuel line in the history of the Marine Corps.

Marines of the 6th ESB were awarded the Navy Presidential Unit Citation for "extraordinary heroism in action against an armed enemy" during Operation Iraqi Freedom.

==== 2004–2005 ====
Continued support in 2004 to 2005 was given by Engineer Support Company from Portland, Oregon (reinforced by Detachment 1 Bulk Fuel Company A from Fort Lewis, Washington, Tucson, Arizona, and Phoenix, Arizona), and Bridge Company A from Battle Creek, Michigan. During this time Engineer Support Company was re-designated as Combat Service Support Company 113 (CSSC-113). Missions during this time included base operations in over a dozen different locations and resupply convoys during Operation Phantom Fury in November 2004. Four Marines were killed in action during this tour. Bridge Company A was attached to the US Army's 155th Engineer Group and rebuilt and maintained bridges all over South/Central Iraq. Their most significant repair mission was to repair a highway bridge at Checkpoint 34A (South of Camp Striker) on Main Supply Route Tampa during early November, 2004. It had been damaged by VBIED attacks in order stop the flow of Multi-National Force - Iraq supplies and reinforcements to Fallujah during their campaign against the insurgency there. Projected to take 7 days to repair, Bridge Company A repaired the bridge, while under enemy fire, in less than 32 hours.

=== Operation Enduring Freedom ===
==== 2011–2012 ====
From July 2011 to Feb. 2012 (OEF 11–2), over 100 Marines from the 6th ESB and individual augments of 6th Communications Battalion deployed as Engineer Company attached to Combat Logistics Battalion 6 to Helmand Province, Afghanistan, during Operation Enduring Freedom.

The majority of the company was based out of Camp Leatherneck, with small detachments of Bulk Fuels and Utilities Marines supporting more than a dozen sites throughout the Area of Operations. Combined teams from the engineer, motor transport, and heavy equipment platoons conducted extensive construction projects and road repairs for infantry and special operations units throughout the northern half of Helmand Province.

Charlie Company was attached to 8th Engineer Support Battalion in 2012, and took over for the Marines in CLB-6.

==== 2012–2013 ====
From 2012 to February 2013, 200 Marines from various units in the battalion, supported by individual augments from 6th Communications Battalion, deployed under the title of Engineer Company Bravo. The company integrated into Combat Logistics Battalion 2, serving in a similar role as the OEF 11-2 deployment.

== See also ==
- List of United States Marine Corps battalions
- Organization of the United States Marine Corps
