= 1st Network Battalion =

USMC Military cyber unit

- Insignia of the 1st Network Battalion, USMC
- Active: June 4, 2020 - Present
- Country: United States
- Branch: United States Marine Corps
- Type: Cyber force, Cyber Defense
- Role: Cyberwarfare; Computer network operations Computer network engineering Cybersecurity engineering
- Size: Battalion
- Part of: Marine Corps Cyberspace Operations Group (MCCOG); Marine Corps Forces Cyberspace Command
- Garrison/HQ: Marine Corps Base Camp Pendleton
- Mottos: "Secure, Operate, Defend"

Commanders
- Current commander: LtCol Jorge J. Caro

1st Network Battalion is a Cyber Defense unit dedicated to the security, protection and operations for the Department of Defense Information Network in tandem with the Marine Corps Enterprise Network (MCEN) throughout its designated area of responsibility, it is currently stationed in Marine Corps Base Camp Pendleton and is under the command of the Marine Corps Cyberspace Operations Group (MCCOG)

The battalion currently provides coverage to the I Marine Expeditionary Force and Marine Corps Installations West alongside relevant training commands under the United States Marine Corps Training and Education Command.

It is the first Cyber Defense dedicated unit of the United States Marine Corps, representing a force of roughly 1000 service members with plans to grow, it is one of three active Network Battalions of the Marine Corps.

== History ==
=== Formation ===
Lt. Col. Juliet H. Calvin's Uncasing of the Colors of the 1st Network Battalion during Covid-19

Since 2017 the Marine Corps understood that it required significant modernization with their enterprise network and C2 (Command and Control) systems that has increased resiliency, interoperability, expeditionary features, serving as the “communications backbone” that incorporates personnel, computers and devices in the USMC network ecosystem.

It was decided that it was more efficient to combine the units available into an organized command structure, hence seven different units consolidated into the 1st Network Battalion which improved the efficiency and capabilities of the USMCs cyber forces.

During June 4 2020 the Uncasing of the Colors (Unit activation ceremony) was postponed to 24 November of the same year due to the Covid-19 outbreak, nevertheless this unit became the first dedicated Cyber Defense unit of the Marine Corps with Lt. Col. Juliet H. Calvin being the first Commanding Officer.

The envisioned goal was to have a sustainable foundation for joint collaborations amongst the United States Cyber Command and Marine Corps Cyberspace Operations Group (MCCOG) in conjunction with the battalion's sister units; 2d Network Battalion alongside 3d Network Battalion

US Marines alongside service members of the 1st Marine Division during Exercise Talisman Sabre 2023 at Lavarack Barracks, Australia

=== Operations & Exercises ===
The unit took part in Exercise Talisman Sabre during 2023 which began on the 22 July and ended on the 4 August 2023

== Mission ==
The First Network Battalion secures, defends and operates the Department of Defense Information Network (DODIN) while conducting Defensive Cyberspace Operations. It supports the Fleet Marine Forces and relevant forces with communications control, cybersecurity services and internal defensive measures in its area of responsibility along with managing the Marine Corps Enterprise Network in order to provide freedom of action across all war-fighting domains and functions while simultaneously denying the same to adversaries.

== See also ==
- History of the United States Marine Corps
- Organization of the United States Marine Corps
- List of United States Marine Corps battalions
