= Combat Logistics Battalion 25 =

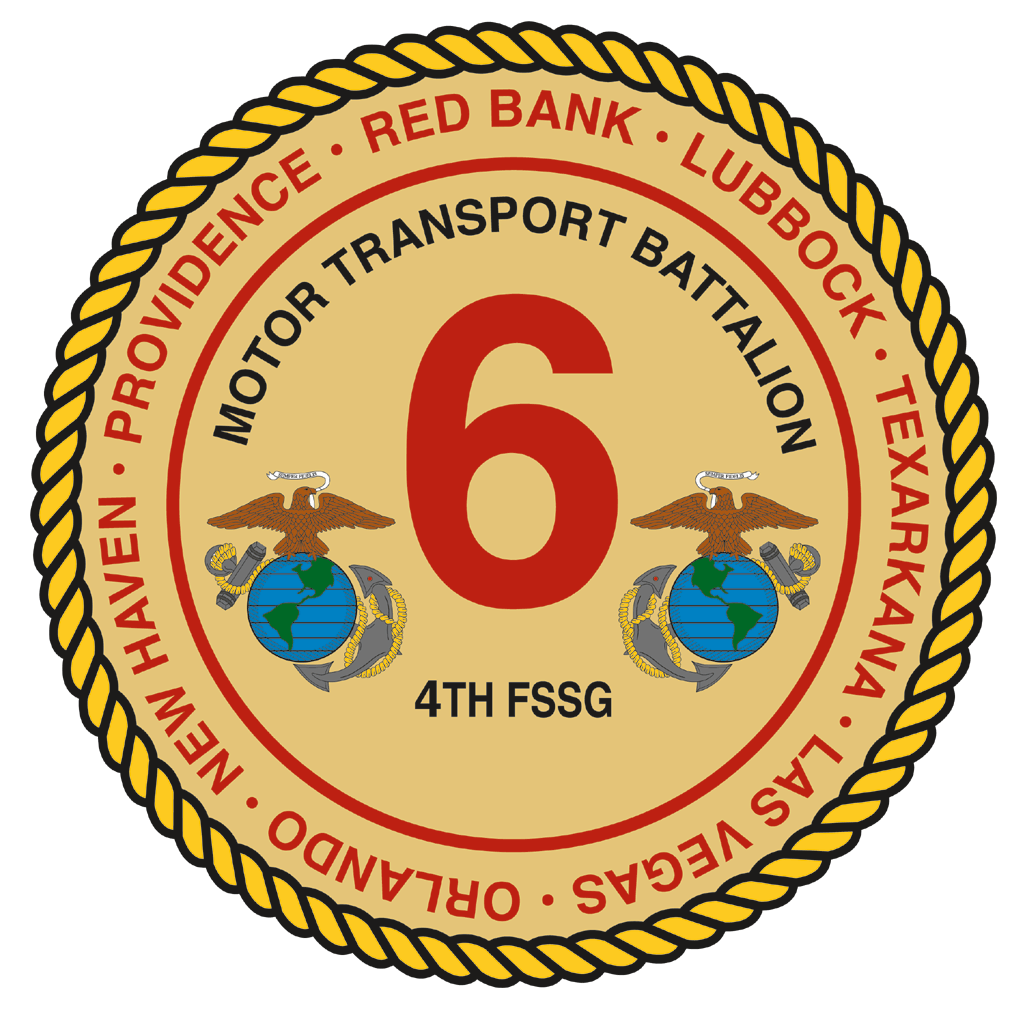
- Combat Logistics Battalion 25 insignia
- Active: N/A
- Country: United States
- Allegiance: United States of America
- Branch: United States Marine Corps
- Type: Logistics
- Part of: 4th Marine Logistics Group
- Motto: N/A
- Engagements: Vietnam War

Commanders
- Current commander: LtCol Terry W. Horton

The Combat Logistics Battalion 25, (originally the 6th Motor Transport Battalion), is a Marine Forces Reserve logistics unit of the United States Marine Corps and is headquartered at Red Bank, New Jersey. The unit falls under Combat Logistics Regiment 45 of the 4th Marine Logistics Group (4th MLG) and Marine Forces Reserve (MARFORRES).

== Organization ==
- Headquarters and Service Company, in Red Bank (NJ)
- Engineer Services Company, in South Bend (IN)
- Maintenance Services Company, in New Haven (CT)
- Transportation Service Company, in Providence (RI)

== See also ==
- List of United States Marine Corps battalions
- Organization of the United States Marine Corps
