= 1st Distribution Support Battalion =

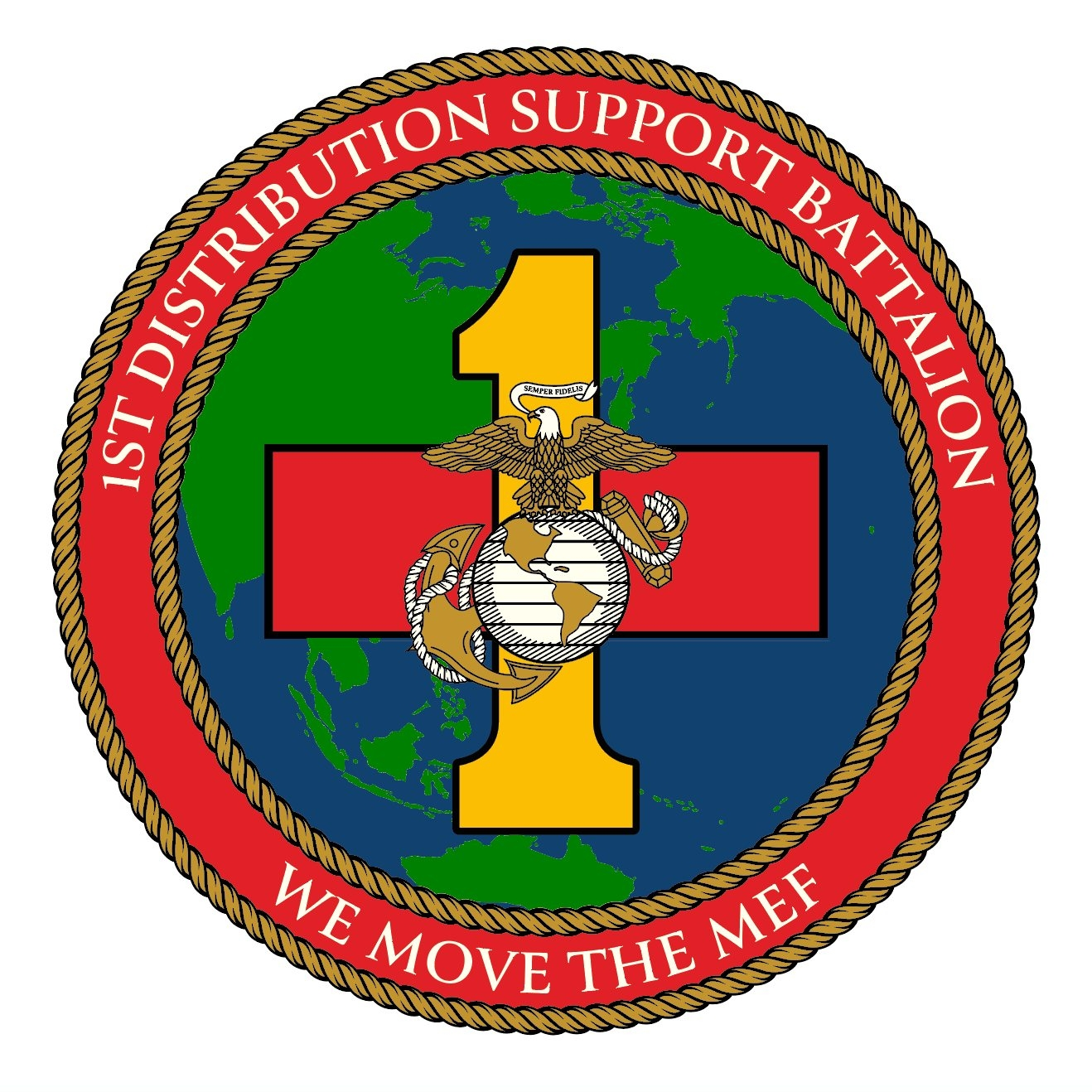
- 1st DSB insignia
- Active: February 7, 1942 - 1998; October 15, 2020 - present
- Country: United States of America
- Branch: United States Marine Corps
- Size: 600
- Part of: 1st Marine Logistics Group
- Garrison/HQ: Marine Corps Base Camp Pendleton
- Nickname: "Red Patchers"
- Motto: We Move the MEF
- Engagements: World War II; Korean War; Operation Desert Storm; Operation Provide Comfort; Operation Restore Hope

Commanders
- Current commander: Lt. Col Harwood

1st Distribution Support Battalion (1st DSB) is a logistics battalion in the United States Marine Corps that supports distributed maritime operations and expeditionary advanced base operations. The unit is based at Marine Corps Base Camp Pendleton, California and falls under the command of the 1st Marine Logistics Group (1st MLG) and the I Marine Expeditionary Force.

== Mission ==
Provide throughput support for I Marine Expeditionary Force and other Marine Air-Ground Task Force operations in order to enable the distribution of equipment, personnel, and supplies by air, ground, and sea.

== Table of organization ==
- Headquarters Company
- Littoral Distribution Company
- Ground Distribution Company
- Support Company

== History ==
The battalion was originally commissioned during World War II as 1st Pioneer Battalion on February 7, 1942. The unit was redesignated as 1st Distribution Support Battalion on 19 October 2023.

== Unit awards ==
A unit citation or commendation is an award bestowed upon an organization for the action cited. Members of the unit who participated in said actions are allowed to wear on their uniforms the awarded unit citation. Awards and decorations of the United States Armed Forces have different categories: i.e. Service, Campaign, Unit, and Valor. 1st DSB has been presented with the following awards:

== See also ==
- List of United States Marine Corps battalions
- Organization of the United States Marine Corps
