= 9th Amphibian Tractor Battalion =

- Country: United States
- Allegiance: United States of America
- Branch: United States Marine Corps
- Type: Mechanized Battalion
- Role: Amphibious Assault
- Size: 103 LVTs
- Part of: Inactive
- Engagements: World War II: Battle of Okinawa

The 9th Amphibian Tractor Battalion ("9th Amtrac Battalion") was an amphibious assault battalion of the United States Marine Corps. The battalion supported the 6th Marine Division during the Battle of Okinawa in World War II.

== History ==
=== Battle of Okinawa ===
Along with the 2nd Amphibian Tractor Group, the 9th Amtrac Battalion (part of the 1st Amphibian Tractor Group) landed the 6th Marine Division and its subordinate units on the island of Okinawa on L-Day. The battalion supported the division throughout the campaign, utilizing the LVT 4 as its main amphibious vehicle. Further inland, the LVTs were used similar to conventional armor, as their mounted Browning machine guns could deliver devastating firepower in support of an infantry unit. However, mines, artillery, and other hazards plagued the amtracs throughout the campaign. By the time the 9th assaulted the Oroku Peninsula, only 17 of its original 103 LVTs were still serviceable.

After its World War II service, the 9th Amphibian Tractor Battalion was decommissioned and its personnel assigned to other units.

== See also ==
- History of the United States Marine Corps
- List of United States Marine Corps battalions
