= 2nd Law Enforcement Battalion =

2nd Military Police Battalion
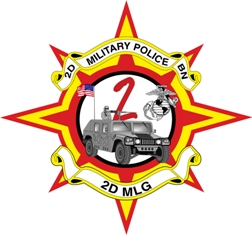
- The insignia of the 2nd Law Enforcement Battalion.
- Active: 2 Jul 2012 – 17 Dec 2020
- Country: United States
- Branch: Marines
- Role: Military Police
- Part of: II Marine Expeditionary Force
- Garrison/HQ: Camp Lejeune

Commanders
- Commanding Officer: LtCol. Rory D. Kent
- Executive Officer: Maj. Thomas B. Turner
- Sergeant Major: SgtMaj Alex Navarez

The 2nd Law Enforcement Battalion was a military police battalion based at Marine Corps Base Camp Lejeune, North Carolina and subordinate to the II Marine Expeditionary Force. It was activated on 2 July 2012, after Marine Corps Bulletin 5400 reactivated the 1st, 2nd and 3rd Military Police Battalions (re-designated as “Law Enforcement Battalions”) in September 2011. On 17 December 2020, all three Law Enforcement Battalions were deactivated as part of the Marine Corps’ Force Design 2030 plan.

== Mission ==
Conduct law and order operations in order to enhance the security environment and promote the rule of law in support of Marine Air Ground Task Force (MAGTF) operations.

Conduct law and order functions to include law enforcement, policing, police advising/training, and limited detention/correction, patrol/incident response operations, route regulation/enforcement, investigations, Joint Prosecution and Exploitation Center operations, Tactical Site Exploitation, identity operations/biometrics support, protective services operations, military working dog operations, police intelligence, physical security and crime prevention expertise/assessments, accident investigations, customs/border clearance support operations, and Military Police support to civil authorities.

== See also ==
- 1st Law Enforcement Battalion
- 3rd Law Enforcement Battalion
- 4th Law Enforcement Battalion
