= 4th Dental Battalion =

- Country: United States
- Branch: USN & USMC
- Type: Dental
- Part of: 4th Marine Logistics Group; United States Marine Corps Reserve

Commanders
- Current commander: Captain Robert A. Studebaker

The 4th Dental Battalion is a unit of the United States Marine Corps Reserve, staffed by personnel from both the United States Marine Corps and the United States Navy that provides dental support to United States Marine Corps forces. The unit is a reserve battalion based out of the Navy Operational Support Center Atlanta in Marietta, Georgia and is part of the 4th Marine Logistics Group. It is one of four dental Marine Corps battalions and the only reserve dental battalion.

The battalion provides overseas support for Marines as well as domestic non-combat joint operations dental clinics. The battalion also provides dental services for civilians during operations and training exercises.

== Units ==
- Headquarters Company: Marietta, Georgia
- 4th Dental Company: Fort Worth, Texas
- 14th Dental Company: Joint Base McGuire–Dix–Lakehurst, New Jersey
- 24th Dental Company: Marietta, Georgia
