= 2nd Landing Support Battalion =

2d Landing Support Battalion
- Active: Nov 17, 1941 - 1979; Oct 16, 2020 - present
- Country: United States of America
- Branch: United States Marine Corps
- Size: 400
- Part of: 2nd Marine Logistics Group
- Garrison/HQ: Marine Corps Base Camp Lejeune
- Nickname: "Red Patchers"
- Engagements: World War II
- Website: https://www.clr2.marines.mil/Units/2nd-Landing-Support-Battalion/

Commanders
- Current commander: LtCol Randall L. Nickel

2d Landing Support Battalion (2d LSB) was a logistics battalion in the United States Marine Corps that supports distributed maritime operations and expeditionary advanced base operations. The unit was based out of Marine Corps Base Camp Lejeune, North Carolina and fell under the command of the 2nd Marine Logistics Group (2d MLG) and the II Marine Expeditionary Force (II MEF).

== Mission ==
Provide throughput support for II Marine Expeditionary Force and other Marine Air-Ground Task Force operations in order to enable the distribution of equipment, personnel, and supplies by air, ground, and sea.

== Table of organization ==
- Headquarters and Service Company.
- Landing Support Company
- Beach and Terminal Operations Company
- Landing Support Equipment Company

== History ==
The battalion was originally commissioned during World War II as Shore Party Detachment, 2nd Marine Division on November 17, 1941.

== Unit awards ==
A unit citation or commendation is an award bestowed upon an organization for the action cited. Members of the unit who participated in said actions are allowed to wear on their uniforms the awarded unit citation. Awards and decorations of the United States Armed Forces have different categories: i.e. Service, Campaign, Unit, and Valor. 2d LSB has been presented with the following awards:

== See also ==
- List of United States Marine Corps battalions
- Organization of the United States Marine Corps
