= Combat Logistics Battalion 7 =

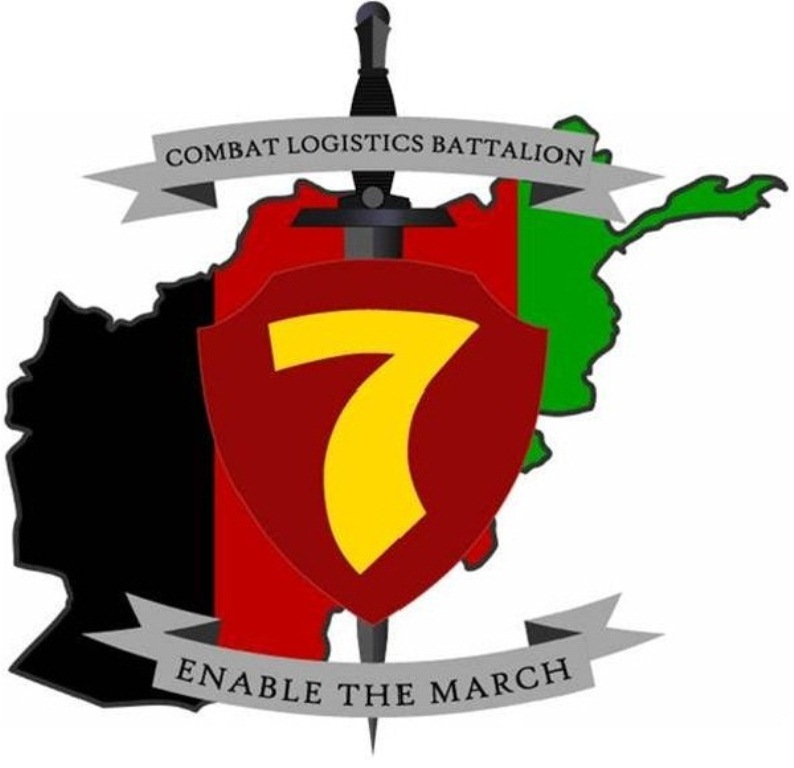
- CLB 7 (Fwd) Logo
- Active: 30 August 1986 – present
- Country: United States
- Branch: USMC
- Type: Logistics
- Part of: Combat Logistics Regiment 1; 1st Marine Logistics Group
- Garrison/HQ: Marine Corps Air Ground Combat Center Twentynine Palms
- Motto: "Enable the March"
- Engagements: Operation Desert Storm; Operation Iraqi Freedom; Operation Enduring Freedom

Commanders
- Current commander: LtCol Greg Lynch

Combat Logistics Battalion 7 (CLB 7) is a logistics battalion of the United States Marine Corps. The unit is based out of the Marine Corps Air Ground Combat Center Twentynine Palms, California and falls under the command of the 1st Marine Logistics Group (1st MLG) and I Marine Expeditionary Force (I MEF).

== Mission ==
=== Wartime mission ===
Combat Logistics Battalion 7 ( - / + ), as the Logistics Combat Element (LCE) of the MAGTF provide Tactical Logistics Support (TLS) to the Regional Command in order to enable/sustain operations and facilitate retrograde.

=== MCAGCC mission ===
Provide combat service support to I MEF units based at MCAGCC, to the Exercise Support Division at MCAGCC, Marine Corps exercise forces operating at MCAGCC, and 23rd Dental Company, beyond organic capabilities. CLB-7 will also provide combat service support to MCAGCC base and other units as directed by the Commanding General, 1st Marine Logistics Group.

== History ==
=== Early years 1976–1989 ===
Activated 30 August 1976 at Twentynine Palms California, as detachment A, 1st Force Service Support Group, Fleet Marine Force.

Redesignated 27 December 1989 as Combat Service Support Detachment 12, Fleet Marine Force.

=== The Gulf War and the 1990s ===
Participated in support of Operations Desert Shield and Desert Storm, Southwest Asia, August 1990 – April 1991.

Redesignated 2 August 1991 as 1st Force Service Support Group, Forward, Fleet Marine Force.

Redesignated 1 August 1992 as Combat Service Support Group 1, Fleet Marine Force.

Participated in Support of the Hunter Warrior Advanced Warfighting Experiment, January–March 1997.

=== The Global War on Terror ===
Participated in Operation Iraqi Freedom, Iraq, March–June 2003 providing logistic support to the 1st Marine Division on its march to Baghdad. The Battalion redeployed to Iraq from August 2004 – February 2005 in Support of Operation Iraqi Freedom II.

Redesignated 1 April 2005 as Combat Logistics Battalion 7 and Reassigned to Combat Logistics Regiment 1, 1st Marine Logistics Group.

The battalion redeployed in support of Operation Iraqi Freedom in the beginning of 2006 and provided logistics to Marine units in the Al Anbar province. CLB-7 undertook their third deployment to Iraq from February to September 2008. The battalion's Marines were stationed at Camp Fallujah, Camp Ramadi and Al Asad Airbase where they provided support to the infantry battalions, conducted logistics convoys, handled security for some EOD (explosive ordnance disposal) missions, conducting Arrival/Departure Air Control Group (A/DACG) operations as well as providing security for recovery missions".

Operation Enduring Freedom

The battalion deployed to Camp Dwyer Helmand Province Afghanistan in March 2011 through October 2011 in support of RCT-1 and RCT-5 (1st Marines and 5th Marines.

== Unit awards ==
A unit citation or commendation is an award bestowed upon an organization for the action cited. Members of the unit who participated in said actions are allowed to wear on their uniforms the awarded unit citation. CLB-7 has been presented with the following awards:

Ribbon	Unit Award
	Presidential Unit Citation
	Navy Unit Commendation
	Meritorious Unit Commendation
	National Defense Service Medal with two Bronze Star
	Southwest Asia Service Medal with two Bronze Stars
	Iraq Campaign Medal
	Global War on Terrorism Expeditionary Medal
	Global War on Terrorism Service Medal

== See also ==
- List of United States Marine Corps battalions
- Organization of the United States Marine Corps
