= 4th Medical Battalion (United States Marine Corps) =

- Country: United States
- Branch: USN & USMC
- Type: Medical
- Part of: 4th Marine Logistics Group; Marine Forces Reserve
- Mottos: "Ministerium Ante Ipse"; Service Before Self
- Engagements: Operation Iraqi Freedom

4th Medical Battalion is a unit of the United States Marine Corps, staffed by personnel from both the United States Marine Corps and the United States Navy that provides medical support to United States Marine Corps forces. The unit is based out of San Diego, California and falls under the command of the 4th Marine Logistics Group and the Marine Forces Reserve.

== Subordinate units ==
- Headquarters and Services Company, in San Diego (CA)
- Surgical Company Alpha, in Millington (TN)
- Surgical Company Bravo, in Washington, D.C.
  - Detachment 6, in Orlando (FL)

== History ==
4th Medical Battalion was activated on 5 July 1943 at Camp Lejeune, North Carolina, as part of the 4th Marine Division, Fleet Marine Force. Shortly thereafter in August the battalion was relocated to Camp Pendleton, California, to prepare for deployment to the Pacific Theater during World War II. In January 1944, the battalion deployed to the Pacific, where it participated in several major campaigns, including Kwajalein, Saipan, Tinian, and Iwo Jima. Following the conclusion of hostilities, the unit returned to Camp Pendleton in October 1945 and was deactivated on 20 November 1945.

The battalion was reactivated on 1 February 1967 at Tacoma, Washington, as part of the 4th Marine Division, Fleet Marine Force, U.S. Marine Corps Reserve. In July 1976, it was relocated to San Diego, California, and was reassigned to the 4th Force Service Support Group, which was later redesignated as the 4th Marine Logistics Group. During Operations Desert Shield and Desert Storm from August 1990 to June 1991, 4th Medical Battalion provided support to Marine forces in Southwest Asia. In March 2003, 4th Medical Battalion deployed as a full unit in support of Operation Iraqi Freedom in Kuwait where it delivered support to combat operations across the theater.

In 2006, reservists from the San Diego–based Headquarters and Service Detachment were mobilized for combat operations in Al Anbar, Iraq, serving alongside 1st Battalion, 24th Marines, Weapons Company, in the city of Fallujah. The following year, in September 2007, additional reservists from the battalion deployed in support of Operation Iraqi Freedom as part of Combat Logistics Battalion 4, Combat Logistics Battalion 8, and Surgical Company Bravo. These elements provided medical support at Camp Fallujah and Camp Taqaddum (Al Taqqadum). The returning members completed their deployment in late March 2008, while follow-on rotations continued to sustain operations at Camp Taqaddum and Korean Village.

From 2008 to 2009, additional elements of the battalion participated in ongoing operations in Iraq. By May 2010, numerous reservists from Headquarters and Service Company had volunteered for deployment to Afghanistan, serving with Provisional Military Police Company and Personal Security Detachment elements in support of Operation Enduring Freedom. From 2009 to 2012, battalion elements continued to provide medical support to coalition operations in Afghanistan.
