= 4th Marine Logistics Group =

Logistics combat element of the U.S. Marine Corps Forces Reserve

- Active: 6 February 1966
- Country: United States
- Allegiance: United States
- Branch: USMC
- Type: Logistics
- Role: Multi-faceted combat service support
- Part of: Marine Forces Reserve
- Garrison/HQ: New Orleans, Louisiana
- Mottos: "In Omnia Paratus" "Prepared for all things"

Commanders
- Current commander: BGen Joseph A. Katz

The 4th Marine Logistics Group (4th MLG) is a reserve logistics unit of the United States Marine Corps. The group is headquartered at New Orleans, Louisiana while its subordinate units are spread across the United States.

== Mission ==
Provide general and direct support and sustained combat service support above the organic capabilities of the support element of the Marine Air-Ground Task Force (MAGTF). These supported units may be in garrison, combat, and/or in separate locations. The MLG will Support the MAGTF in amphibious assaults and subsequent operations ashore

== Organization ==
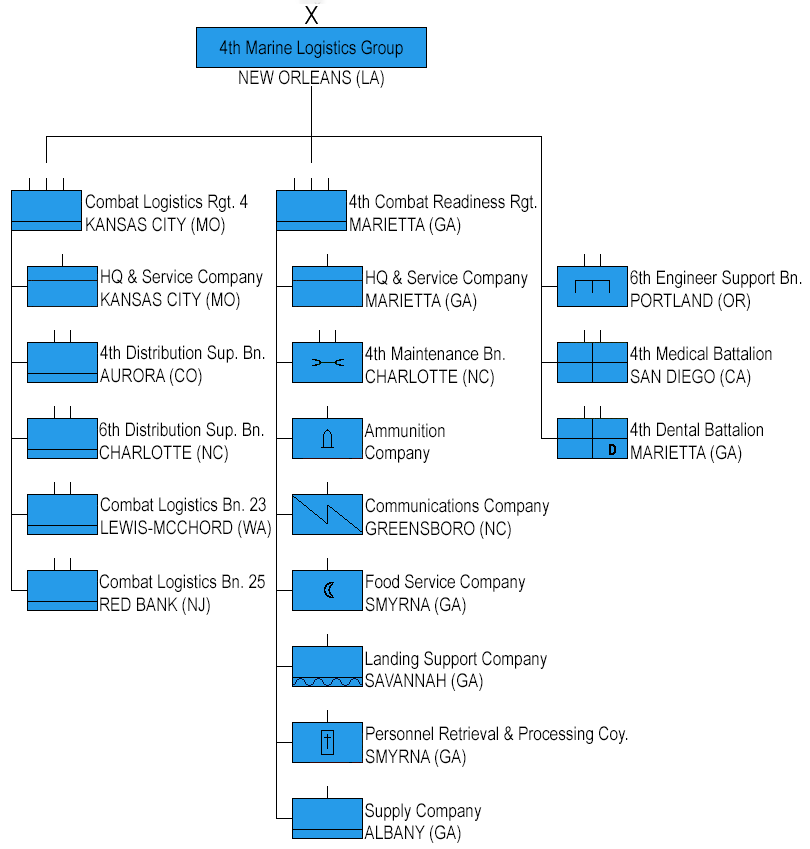
4th Marine Logistics Group organization as of May 2026

As of May 2026 the 4th Marine Logistics Group consists of the following units:

- 4th Marine Logistics Group (4th MLG), in New Orleans (LA)
  - Combat Logistics Regiment 4 (CLR 4), in Kansas City (MO)
    - Headquarters Company, in Kansas City (MO)
    - 4th Distribution Support Battalion, in Aurora (CO)
      - Headquarters and Service Company, in Aurora (CO)
      - Motor Transport Company, in Lubbock (TX)
      - Maintenance Company, in Waco (TX)
      - Supply Company, in San Jose (CA)
    - 6th Distribution Support Battalion, in Charlotte (NC)
      - Headquarters and Service Company, in Charlotte (NC)
      - Littoral Distribution Company A, in Savannah (GA)
    - Combat Logistics Battalion 23, (CLB 23), in Joint Base Lewis–McChord (WA)
      - Headquarters and Service Company, in Joint Base Lewis–McChord (WA)
      - Transportation Service Company, in Lathrop (CA)
    - Combat Logistics Battalion 25, (CLB 25), in Red Bank (NJ)
      - Headquarters and Service Company, in Red Bank (NJ)
      - Maintenance Services Company, in New Haven (CT)
      - Transportation Service Company, in Providence (RI)
  - 4th Combat Readiness Regiment (CRR 4), in Marietta (GA)
    - Headquarters and Service Company, in Marietta (GA)
    - 4th Maintenance Battalion, in Charlotte (NC)
      - Headquarters and Service Company, in Charlotte (NC)
      - Engineer Maintenance Company
      - Electronics Maintenance Company
      - Supply Company, in Raleigh (NC)
      - Motor Transport Company, in Orlando (FL)
      - Maintenance Company, in Rock Island (IL)
    - Ammunition Company
    - Communications Company, in Greensboro (NC)
    - Food Service Company, in Smyrna (GA)
    - Landing Support Company, in Savannah (GA)
    - Personnel Retrieval and Processing Company, in Smyrna (GA)
    - Supply Company, in Albany (GA)
  - 6th Engineer Support Battalion, (6th ESB), in Portland (OR)
    - Headquarters and Service Company, in Portland (OR)
    - Bulk Fuel Company A, in Tucson (AZ)
    - Bulk Fuel Company B, in Wilmington (DE)
    - Bulk Fuel Company C, at Luke Air Force Base (AZ)
    - Engineer Company A, in Springfield (OR)
    - Engineer Company C, in Millington (TN)
    - Engineer Support Company, in Battle Creek (MI)
  - 4th Medical Battalion, in San Diego (CA)
    - Headquarters and Service Company, in San Diego (CA)
    - Surgical Company A, in Millington (TN)
    - Surgical Company B, in Washington, D.C.
  - 4th Dental Battalion, in Marietta (GA)
    - Headquarters Company, in Marietta (GA)
    - 4th Dental Company, at Naval Air Station Joint Reserve Base Fort Worth (TX)
    - 14th Dental Company, at Joint Base McGuire–Dix–Lakehurst (NJ)
    - 24th Dental Company, in Marietta (GA)

== History ==
On 6 February 1966, the Headquarters of the 4th Force Service Support Regiment was activated at the Armed Forces Reserve Center in Midland, Texas. During January 1968, the headquarters relocated to the Marine Reserve Training Center, Orlando, Florida. The headquarters again relocated to the Navy and Marine Corps Reserve Training Center, Atlanta, Georgia during 1971. In May 1976, the unit was redesignated the 4th Force Service Support Group, Fleet Marine Force. In January 1987, the headquarters relocated to Marietta, Georgia. The flag of the 4th FSSG was moved to its present site in New Orleans in February 1992.

== See also ==
- Organization of the United States Marine Corps
- List of United States Marine Corps logistics groups
