= Combat Logistics Battalion 15 =

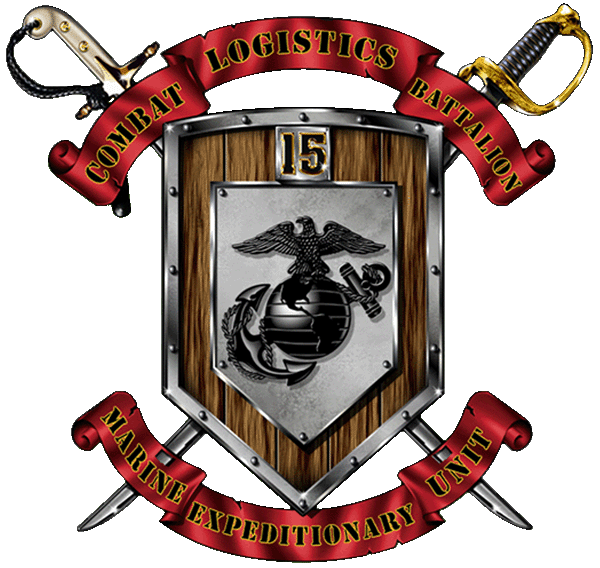
- CLB-15 Unit Crest
- Active: 15 October 1987 to present
- Country: United States
- Allegiance: United States of America
- Branch: United States Marine Corps
- Type: Combat Logistics
- Role: Amphibious / Expeditionary
- Size: Battalion
- Part of: Combat Logistics Regiment 17 or 15th Marine Expeditionary Unit (when so assigned)
- Garrison/HQ: Marine Corps Base Camp Pendleton
- Motto(s): "Leaders in Combat Logistics"
- Colors: Scarlet and Silver
- Mascot(s): Atlas (mythology)
- Anniversaries: 35 years active on 15 Oct 2022
- Engagements: Operation Fiery Vigil; Southwest Asia Cease Fire Campaign; Operation Restore Hope; Operation Support Hope; Operation Vigilant Warrior; Operation Southern Watch; Operation Stabilize; Operation Enduring Freedom; Operation Iraqi Freedom; Operation Unified Assistance

Commanders
- Current commander: LtCol Linsay Mathwick as of 01 October 2021
- Notable commanders: MajGen Charles L. Hudson; 10 Aug 1990 to 6 Sep 1990; LtGen Robert R. Ruark; 19 Feb 1999 to 24 Aug 2000

Combat Logistics Battalion 15 (CLB-15) is a military logistics battalion in the United States Marine Corps based out of Camp Pendleton, California. It consists of approximately 275 Marines and Sailors. It is part of Combat Logistics Regiment 17 within the 1st Marine Logistics Group (1st MLG), I Marine Expeditionary Force (I MEF). When assigned under the operational control of the 15th Marine Expeditionary Unit (15th MEU), it becomes the Logistics Combat Element (LCE) providing expeditionary combat logistics support to all supported elements of the Marine Expeditionary Unit. CLB-15 has two sister MEU CLBs also based out of Camp Pendleton: CLB-11 and CLB-13.

== Mission ==
Provide expeditionary combat logistics to the 15th Marine Expeditionary Unit in order to enable accomplishment of all assigned missions across a wide spectrum of conventional and selected maritime special operations.

== Subordinate units ==
- Headquarters Company(S-1, S-2/3, S-4, S-6, Supply)
- Combat Logistics Company (Engineers, Landing Support, Motor Transport)
- Maintenance Detachment (Maintainers, Heavy Equipment Mechanics, Welders)
- Health Services Detachment (Battalion Aid Station, Dental, Shock Trauma)
- Explosive Ordnance Disposal (EOD) Detachment

== History and lineage ==
=== Inception and early years (1987–1991) ===
Marine Amphibious Unit Service Support Group 15 (MSSG-15) was activated on 15 October 1987 at Marine Corps Base Camp Pendleton California and was assigned to the 1st Force Service Support Group (1st FSSG). The battalion's intended purpose was to serve, when so assigned and on a scheduled rotational basis, as the Combat Service Support Element (CSSE) for the 15th Marine Amphibious Unit (MAU). The battalion was redesignated as Marine Expeditionary Unit Service Support Group (MSSG-15) on 5 February 1988 to reflect the renaming of the 15th MAU to the 15th Marine Expeditionary Unit (MEU). During October 1989, elements of MSSG-15, under the operational control of the 15th MEU, participated in the Loma Prieta earthquake relief efforts in the San Francisco Bay Area of California by performing their assigned relief missions and also taking on several volunteer projects to help the victims of the disaster. During their routine amphibious deployment beginning in June 1991, MSSG-15, under the 15th MEU, participated in Operation Fiery Vigil by assisting in the evacuation of designated personnel from the Republic of the Philippines after the eruption of Mount Pinatubo. Later in the summer of 1991 elements of MSSG-15, under the 15th MEU, participated in support of the Southwest Asia Cease Fire campaign following Operation Desert Storm after relieving the 11th MEU.

=== Post Desert Storm years (1992–2000) ===
From December 1992 to January 1993, MSSG-15, under the 15th MEU, participated in Operation Restore Hope to assist in the civil war torn and famine stricken country of Somalia. While in Somalia, MSSG-15 supported the securing of the capital city of Mogadishu and the American Embassy on the first day then quickly moved out to outlying areas of Berbera, Baido and Kismayo to assist with food distribution convoys and help restore order. From July through August 1994, MSSG-15, under the 15th MEU, participated in Operation Support Hope in Rwanda and then later assisted in the relocation of the United States Liaison Office from Mogadishu, Somalia to Nairobi, Kenya. From September through October 1994, MSSG-15 participated in support of Operation Vigilant Warrior as part of the Southwest Asia Cease Fire Campaign following Operation Desert Storm. In February 1996 and again in July 1997, MSSG-15, under the 15th MEU, participated in Operation Southern Watch once again in Southwest Asia. In February 2000, MSSG-15, under the 15th MEU, participated in support of the Australian-led Operation Stabilize in East Timor.

=== Post 9/11 years (2001–2009) ===
In September 2001, MSSG-15 again participated in support of Operation Stabilize in East Timor. From October 2001 through January 2002, MSSG-15, under the 15th MEU, participated in Operation Enduring Freedom by supporting an amphibious assault over 400 miles into the land-locked country of Afghanistan. Landing at a remote airbase 90 miles southwest of Kandahar, MSSG-15 supported the establishment of Camp Rhino, America's first Forward Operating Base in country while maintaining the first significant conventional ground presence in Afghanistan. MSSG-15 later moved north to Kandahar International Airport securing a new forward operating base. With the move, MSSG-15 was able to continue to support new missions and support the building of a prison camp that housed numerous Taliban and al-Qaeda fighters. In November 2001, concurrent with actions occurring in Afghanistan, elements of MSSG-15 participated in support of humanitarian efforts in Djibouti.

In February 2003, MSSG-15, under the 15th MEU, deployed to Kuwait in support of what was then known as Operation Enduring Freedom. From March 2003 through July 2003, MSSG-15 participated in what began Operation Iraqi Freedom (OIF) and the invasion of coalition forces into Iraq to topple the regime of Saddam Hussein. During February and March 2003, tactical control of the 15th MEU was assigned to the United Kingdom's 3 Commando Brigade Royal Marines for OIF. On 21 March 2003, elements of MSSG-15 crossed the border into Southern Iraq and supporting the securing of the port of Umm Qasr and enabled follow-on humanitarian assistance to begin. By late March 2003, elements of MSSG-15 (with the 15th MEU now back under I Marine Expeditionary Force) moved to An Nasiriyah, Iraq to relieve the Marines of Task Force Tarawa. Elements of MSSG-15 provided humanitarian assistance to the local population that included purifying drinking water, immediate medical care, helping establish the local government, police, and other local services.

From December 2004 through January 2005, MSSG-15 participated in support of Operation Unified Assistance in Southern Asia supporting the 2004 Indonesian tsunami relief efforts by providing disaster relief to survivors of a massive tsunami in Sumatra, Indonesia, and southern Sri Lanka. Following this period, the battalion was redesignated as Combat Logistics Battalion 15 (CLB-15) on 15 March 2006 and assigned to Combat Logistics Regiment 17, 1st Marine Logistics Group (1st MLG). The redesignation from MSSG-15 to CLB-15 was as a result of the larger logistics reorganization from the 1st FSSG to the 1st MLG. The battalion's intended purpose remained to serve, when so assigned and on a scheduled rotational basis, as the Logistics Combat Element (LCE) for the 15th MEU.

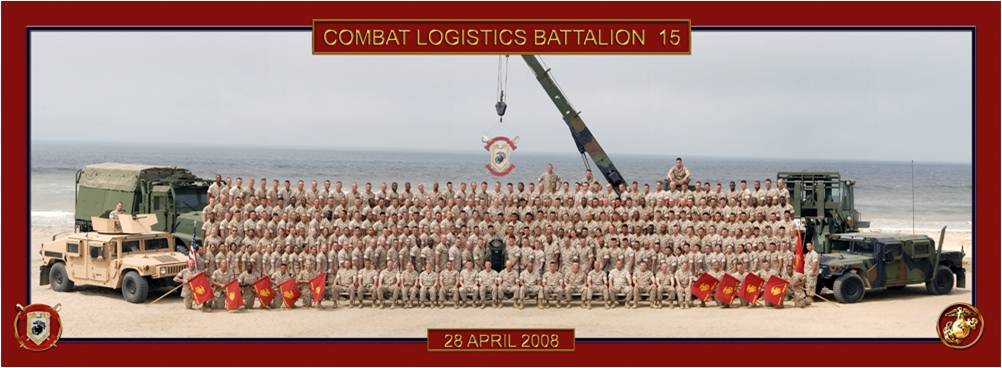
CLB-15 assembled for a battalion photo at Del Mar Beach on Camp Pendleton, CA following their return from Iraq (April 2008).

From November 2006 through May 2007, CLB-15 once again participated in Operation Iraqi Freedom. CLB-15, under the 15th MEU, was committed into Iraq to support area commanders in the Al Anbar Province. Spread throughout the region from Korean Village in Ar Rutba, to Ramadi, and the Haditha triad, CLB-15 supported security actions to the area which enabled the establishment of Iraqi law enforcement, economic progress, and the creation of local Iraqi government. Due in part to their successes, the needs of the area commanders, and being part of the Multi-National Force-Iraq "surge" to defeat insurgent forces across the country, the CLB-15, under the 15th MEU was extended twice, turning what was supposed to be a six-month deployment into almost nine months.

=== Post Afghanistan and Iraq years (2010–2013) ===
From August through October 2010 and during a routine Western Pacific (WESTPAC) deployment, torrential rains ravaged Pakistan and caused major flooding throughout the country. As a result, CLB-15 participated in humanitarian relief supporting Pakistan flood relief efforts. In the final weeks of September 2010, CLB-15 assisted in the rescue and life support of 62 Ethiopian and Somali immigrants at sea from their disabled skiff. The rescued persons stayed aboard the USS Pearl Harbor (LSD-52) into early November 2010 where they were given medical care, food, water, and clothes by CLB-15 before being patriated to Kenya. CLB-15 completed her WESTPAC deployment in December 2010 and from February to September 2012 conducted its rigorous pre-deployment training program (PTP) under the operational control of the 15th MEU.

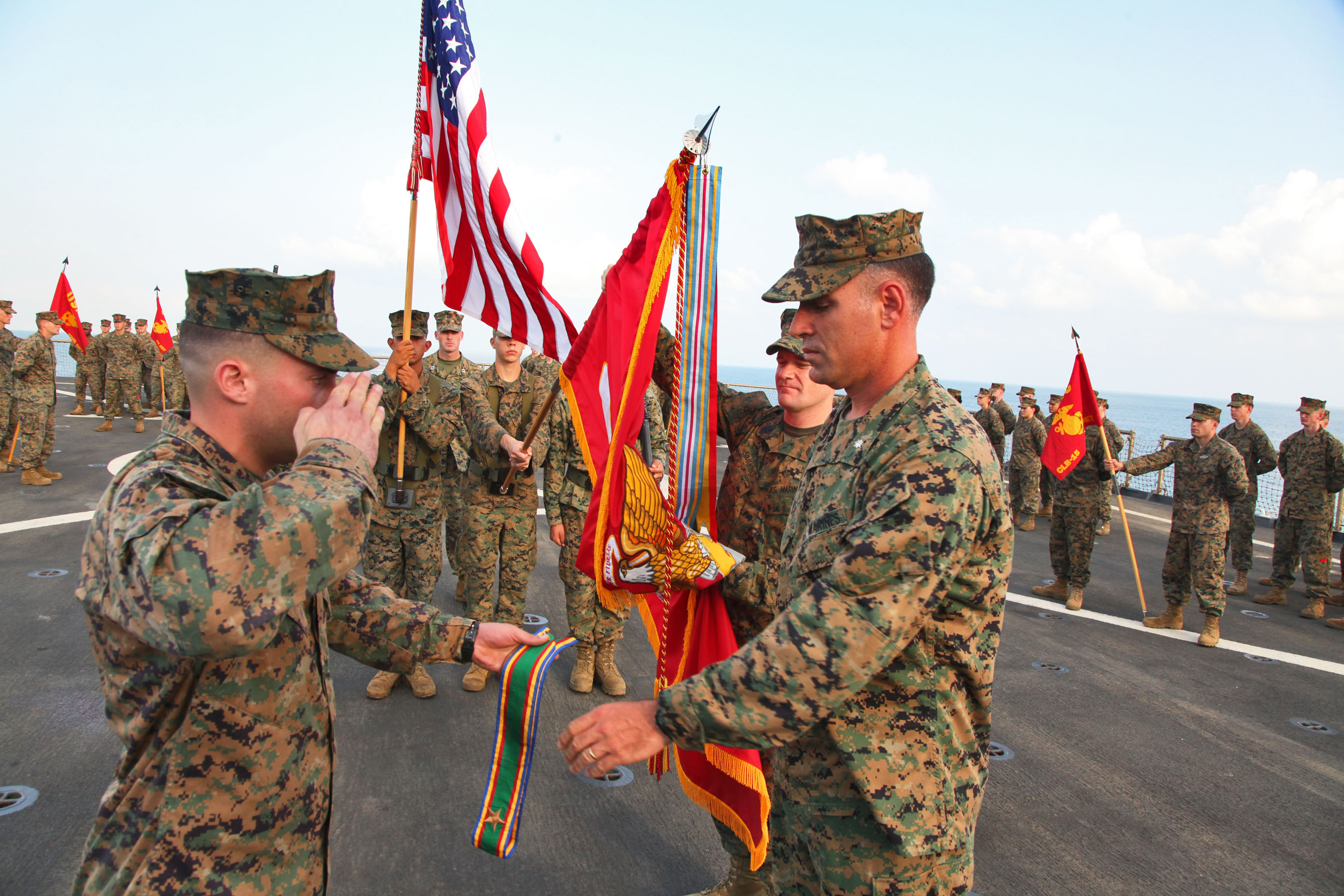
CLB-15 25th Anniversary and Colors Rededication Ceremony on the flight deck of the USS RUSHMORE during WESTPAC 12-02 (Oct 2012).

In September 2012, CLB-15 was deployed for WESTPAC 12–02 with all elements of the 15th MEU: CLB-15 (a.k.a. "Blackout"), 3rd Battalion, 5th Marines (a.k.a. "Darkhorse"), and Marine Medium Helicopter Squadron 364(rein) (a.k.a. "Purple Foxes"); as well as all elements of PHIBRON Three: USS Rushmore (LSD-47), USS Peleliu (LHA-5), and USS Green Bay (LPD-20). On 15 October 2012 CLB-15 celebrated her 25th anniversary during a small but formal battalion colors re-dedication ceremony on the flight deck of the USS Rushmore (LSD-47) just prior to pulling into the liberty port of Darwin, Australia. During this deployment, CLB-15 participated in several major named exercises: Exercise Eager Mace at Camp Buehring near the Udairi Range Complex in Kuwait, Exercise Iron Magic in the United Arab Emirates, and Exercise Red Reef in Saudi Arabia as well as sustainment training ashore in Djibouti. Of additional note during this deployment, and to coincide with the beginning of Fiscal Year 2013, CLB-15 was redesignated as a monitored command code (MCC 1US). As such, the battalion is now manned and equipped from Headquarters, Marine Corps vice ad hoc personnel and equipment sourcing from internal to the 1st MLG. CLB-15 returned to home station at Camp Pendleton in May 2013 following the completion of WESTPAC 12–02.

== Honors awarded ==
Presidential Unit Citation streamer (Iraq 2003)

Joint Meritorious Unit Award streamer (Somalia 1992–93)

Navy Unit Commendation streamer with four bronze stars (Southwest Asia 1990–91, 1994, 1997–98; Afghanistan 2001–02; Iraq 2006–07)

Meritorious Unit Commendation streamer with four bronze stars (1987–89, 1995–97, 2000, 2004–05, 2010)

National Defense Service Medal streamer with one bronze star

Armed Forces Expeditionary Medal streamer with two bronze stars

Southwest Asia Service Medal streamer with one bronze star

Afghanistan Campaign Medal streamer with two bronze stars Iraqi Campaign Medal streamer with four bronze stars

Global War on Terrorism Expeditionary Medal streamer

Global War on Terrorism Service Medal streamer

== See also ==
- History of the United States Marine Corps
- List of United States Marine Corps battalions
- Organization of the United States Marine Corps
