= 7th Engineer Support Battalion (United States) =

7th Engineer Support Battalion ("Big Red 7")
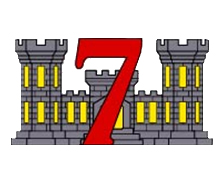
- 7th ESB insignia
- Country: United States of America
- Branch: United States Marine Corps
- Role: Combat/General Engineering and EOD
- Part of: 1st Marine Logistics Group; I Marine Expeditionary Force
- Garrison/HQ: Marine Corps Base Camp Pendleton
- Nickname: The Big Red 7
- Motto: "All We Do Is Win"
- Engagements: Vietnam War; Operation Desert Storm; Operation Iraqi Freedom (OIF); Operation Enduring Freedom (OEF-A); *Operation Moshtarak

Commanders
- Current commander: LtCol Andrew Nelson

The 7th Engineer Support Battalion (7th ESB – "Big Red 7") is an engineer support unit of the United States Marine Corps and is headquartered at Marine Corps Base Camp Pendleton, California. The unit falls under the command of 1st Marine Logistics Group and the I Marine Expeditionary Force.

== Mission statement ==
7th ESB provides mobility, countermobility, survivability, general engineering, and explosive ordnance disposal support to I Marine Expeditionary Force (MEF) in order to enable the tactical agility and mobility of the Marine Air Ground Task Force (MAGTF).

=== Current units ===
- Headquarters and Service Company
- Alpha (A) Company
- Bravo (B) Company
- Charlie (C) Company
- Explosive Ordnance Disposal Company
- Engineer Support Company
- Bulk Fuel Company

== History ==
=== 1950-1964 ===
7th Engineer Battalion was activated on September 29, 1950, at Marine Corps Base Camp Pendleton, CA. The battalion was rapidly built up with equipment and troops for deployment to the Korean War. Activated companies included Headquarters, Support, A, B, Bulk Fuel, with a Fixed Bridge Platoon and Floating Bridge Platoon attached. 7th ESB never went to Korea however with all its new equipment, it became the training command for all engineers headed overseas to 1st Engineer Battalion in Korea. From 1951 to 1954 the battalion also completed various engineering projects aboard MCB Camp Pendleton and constructed cold weather training facilities in the San Jacinto and Sierra Mountains.

7th Engineer Battalion was attached to the 1st Marine Division in October 1955. That same year, an Explosive Ordnance Disposal (EOD) Platoon was attached to the battalion and was mainly used for clearing ranges. In 1956, the battalion conducted a rigorous training cycle focusing on ambushes, construction, and bridging. The battalion demonstrated its bridging capabilities when the Santa Margarita River flooded in 1957. An unprecedented, 339 feet of M-6 bridging were used to span the swollen river which, at that time, was the longest M-6 Bridge ever erected. That same year, the battalion increased the size of the Fixed Bridge Platoon to a company and the Floating Bridge Platoon was re-designated as 1st Bridge Platoon together creating a new Bridge Company. In 1962, the battalion's Company B was embarked aboard ship in support of the Cuban Missile Crisis response.

=== Vietnam War ===
On June 1, 1965, Company A attached to Regimental Landing Team-7 and embarked ship headed for South Vietnam. In August 1965, the remainder of the battalion was ordered to depart for service in Vietnam, arriving in Da Nang on August 24, 1965. From Da Nang, the battalion supported the III Marine Amphibious Force (MAF) throughout the I Corps Tactical Zone. During the following year the battalion constructed an M-4 aluminum pontoon bridge spanning 1,478 feet over the Da Nang River, the longest ever built.

Many of the battalion's missions in 1967 included the construction of non-standard bridges, M-4 aluminum pontoon bridges, and pile bent bridges as well as the maintenance and upgrading of over 120 km of roads. In 1968, Company A constructed a coffer dam while Company D participated in Operation Mameluke Thrust. Service Company provided over 33 million gallons of fresh water to the Marines of III MAF.

Throughout 1969 and 1970 the battalion continued upgrading and maintaining roads, mine sweeping and providing general engineer support until it returned to MCB Camp Pendleton in September 1970. During April 1971, the battalion was reassigned to the 1st Marine Division and in June Company A detached from the battalion and was relocated to Marine Corps Air Ground Combat Center Twentynine Palms, California.

=== 1970s-1980s ===
In March 1976, 7th Engineers was re-designated as 7th Engineer Support Battalion (7th ESB) and was reassigned to the newly formed 1st Force Service Support Group (1st FSSG). 1st Bulk Fuel Company was transferred from 1st Supply Battalion at this time. From 1977 to 1979 the battalion participated in several exercises including VARSITY EAGLE, OPPORTUNE LIFT, and VARSITY CLEANEX on MCB Camp Pendleton, MCAGCC Twentynine Palms, San Clemente Island, and Barstow, California. Members of the battalion also participated in Operation KERNEL POTLATCH, a joint US-Canadian fleet landing exercise.

7th Bulk Fuel Company was activated in April 1983 followed by the activation of Bridge Company in July of the same year bringing the battalion up to two bridge companies and two bulk fuel companies. For the next two years Companies A, B, and C, conducted horizontal construction, building roads, earthwork for runways, and replacing AM-2 matting throughout all Marine Corps installations across the western United States. Bulk Fuel Company trained on fire fighting and the Amphibious Assault Fuel System (AAFS). Bridge Company continued increasing proficiency in constructing Medium Girder Bridges (MGB) and M4T6 rafts in the Del Mar Boat Basin.

=== Gulf War & the 1990s ===
On December 20, 1990, 7th ESB deployed in force to Saudi Arabia in support of Operation Desert SHield and was transferred under operational control to Direct Support Command. Operation Desert Storm began on February 23, 1991, and 7th ESB participated in all aspects of the offensive operations. The battalion returned home to MCB Camp Pendleton by April 24, 1991. The 7th ESB Alpha Company, out of 29 Palms, CA was deployed September 1990.

7th ESB deployed to Mogadishu, Somalia on December 15, 1992, in support of Operation Restore Hope. From December 15, 1992, to January 25, 1993, EOD Company assisted in over 300 calls for support recovering and disposing of over 350,000 pounds of ordnance and over two million rounds of ammunition. Bulk Fuel Company employed and operated five AAFS and a Tactical Airfield Fuel Dispensing System (TAFDS) which serviced over 26 different nations during the operation. The battalion's utilities section purified and provided over three million gallons of water to the multinational contingent.

In January 1993, while the battalion was redeployed from Somalia when the Santa Margarita River flooded severely damaging Marine Corps Air Station Camp Pendleton. The Marines of 7th ESB, purified drinking water, rebuilt eight miles of roads and rebuilt the levee that separates the MCAS and the Santa Margarita River.

On December 30, 1994, Bridge Company was deactivated and its personnel and equipment redistributed throughout the battalion. In March 1995, Company A reactivated and constructed the Combat Skills Training Facility at Camp Deluz. During 1996, EOD techs provided range sweeps at multiple Marine Corps and Air Force installation across the Southwestern United States. Additionally, EOD also supported the United States Secret Service in Los Angeles and San Diego. In February 1996, Company C deployed to the United States Army's Fort Irwin National Training Center, California where it acted as a 'Soviet Engineer Battalion' as opposition force against U.S. Army units. During the fall of 1996, and per the Commandant's Guidance, 7th ESB was tasked with constructing the obstacles courses, assault courses, and warrior stations for the Crucible, at Edson Range.

Company B deployed to Annette Island in Southeast Alaska in support of Operation Alaskan Road in August 1997. During the three-month joint civil-military operation, Company B assisted with the construction of over 14.7 miles of paved roads, the improvement of 10 miles of unimproved roads, and the construction of a 300-man base camp.

In July 2000, Company C deployed to the Kingdom of Tonga constructing a music/library/administrative facility for the Tailulu College. The Marines of Company C were the first Marine Corps Engineers to execute construction in the Kingdom of Tonga.

=== Global War on Terror ===
==== Operation Iraqi Freedom ====
During the first portion of 2001, 7th ESB deployed personnel in support of United States Department of State-sponsored Humanitarian Demining Training Program in Djibouti, Africa. During the second half of 2001, Company B deployed to Egypt with Brigade Service Support Group (BSSG)-1 while participating in Exercise Bright Star 01 where it built and maintained a base camp for 3500 Marines. After the September 11 attacks, 7th ESB attached engineers to MEU Service Support Group-15, 15th Marine Expeditionary Unit, Task Force-58. The Marines were among the first American forces to enter Afghanistan in support of Operation Enduring Freedom (OEF) as they helped establish Camp Rhino providing water purification, electricity, heavy equipment, security and EOD support.

In April 2002, Company A participated in Exercise Desert Scimitar. Bridge platoon constructed a 457-foot continuous-span ribbon bridge over the rapidly flowing Colorado River. The bridge crossed over nearly 1,700 Marines, and over 500 tactical vehicles.

On January 28, 2003, the battalion deployed to Camp Coyote, Kuwait in preparation for 2003 Invasion of Iraq. On March 20, Company B and Company C, breached lanes through the Iraqi border obstacle belt providing entry for Task Force Tarawa and Regimental Combat Team (RCT)-7. 7th ESB supported the I Marine Expeditionary Force (I MEF) through all facets of engineering during the push to Baghdad before redeploying to Kuwait on May 16, 2003.

The battalion returned to Iraq in February 2004 with elements of Headquarters and Service (H&S) Company, Company A, Support Company, Bulk Fuel Company and EOD Company and assumed the role as Combat Service Support Battalion (CSSB)-1. The bulk of the battalion operated out of Camp Fallujah supporting Regimental Combat Team 1 (RCT-1) and other units in the Al Anbar Province. CSSB-1 participated in Operation Vigilant Resolve by establishing tactical control points (TCP's) around Fallujah, isolating the city in preparation for offensive operations of RCT-1.

By the end of September 2004, 7th ESB conducted a relief in place (RIP) with Company C replacing Company A, while H&S, Bulk Fuel and EOD Companies remained in Iraq, only rotating personnel from Camp Pendleton. The battalion, minus a few detachments had redeployed back to MCB Camp Pendleton by March 2005.

Contingents of 7th ESB companies formed Combat Logistics Battalion 5 (CLB-5) and deployed to Fallujah, Iraq in early 2006. During the deployment, the battalion provided engineer support throughout the Al Anbar Province. The battalion redeployed to MCB Camp Pendleton in September 2006 while Company A conducted a relief in place with Company C. In October 2006, Company B was stood up and was assigned the bridging mission for the battalion. Company A redeployed to MCB Camp Pendleton in March 2007. In August 2007, EOD Company and Company B deployed personnel to Iraq in support of OIF 6–8.2.

The battalion deployed to Fallujah, Iraq in February 2008 in support of OIF 6–8.1 and returned in September 2008. Support Company and Company A attached Marines to CLB-7 to deploy in support of OIF 9.1. EOD Company continued to support the global war on terror as they deployed personnel to both Iraq and Afghanistan.

==== Operation Enduring Freedom ====
Company B attached to CLB-1 and deployed to Afghanistan in support of OEF 9.2 in June 2009. In October 2009, 7th ESB completed it pre-deployment block leave and deployed to Camp Leatherneck, Afghanistan.

During its deployment, the battalion provided engineering support throughout Helmand Province. The battalion stood up Combat Logistics Company 7 in order to support 3rd Battalion, 6th Marines and Operation Moshtarak during the clear and hold phase into Marjeh, Afghanistan. In May 2010, the battalion completed its relief in place with 9th Engineer Support Battalion and redeployed to MCB Camp Pendleton.

During May 2011, 7th ESB deployed and conducted a relief in place with 8th Engineer Support Battalion in Camp Leatherneck, Afghanistan for OEF 11.2. Throughout the deployment the battalion provided mobility by conducting route clearance for International Security Assistance Force (ISAF). Bridge platoon greatly enhanced mobility throughout the area of operation (AO) by emplacing Medium Girder Bridges (MGB) and building non-standard bridges over wadi's and irrigation canals. The battalion redeployed to MCB Camp Pendleton on December 14, 2011.

In 2012, the battalion supported construction projects across Southern California. Company C completed a road project in Imperial Beach, California for Joint Task Force North and the United States Border Patrol. Companies A, B, C constructed K-Span structures at Camp Wilson, MCAGCC Twentynine Palms.

On 22 and 23 June 2020 respectively the Bridge company was disbanded and reformed as C Company as part of the Marine Corps' ongoing re-structuring.

After the end of the Global War on Terror in September of 2021, Marines of 7th Engineer Battalion have been deployed for training operations in Australia, construction projects in Palau, and support of the Southern Border's defense.

== Awards ==
* Presidential Unit Citation Streamer with three Bronze Stars: Vietnam 1966–1967 1967–1968 Iraq 2003 Afghanistan 2009–2010 (MARADMIN 615/12)

* Joint Meritorious Unit Citation Streamer: Somalia 1992–1993 (MCBUL 1650)

* Navy Unit CommendationStreamer with two Bronze Stars: Southwest Asia 1990–1991 1993–1994 Iraq 2004–2005 (MARADMIN 056/12)

* Meritorious Unit Commendation Streamer with two Bronze Stars: Vietnam 1969–1970 1984–1986 1996–1997

* National Defense Service Medal Streamer with three Bronze Stars

* Armed Forces Expeditionary Medal Streamer

* Vietnam Service Medal Streamer with two Silver and three Bronze Stars

* Southwest Asia Service Medal Streamer with two Bronze Stars

* Iraqi Campaign Medal Streamer with two Bronze Stars

* Global War on Terrorism Expeditionary Medal Streamer

* Global War on Terrorism Service Medal Streamer

* Vietnam Cross of Gallantry with Palm Streamer

* Vietnam Civil Actions Medal Streamer

== See also ==
- List of United States Marine Corps battalions
- Organization of the United States Marine Corps
