= 1st Maintenance Battalion =

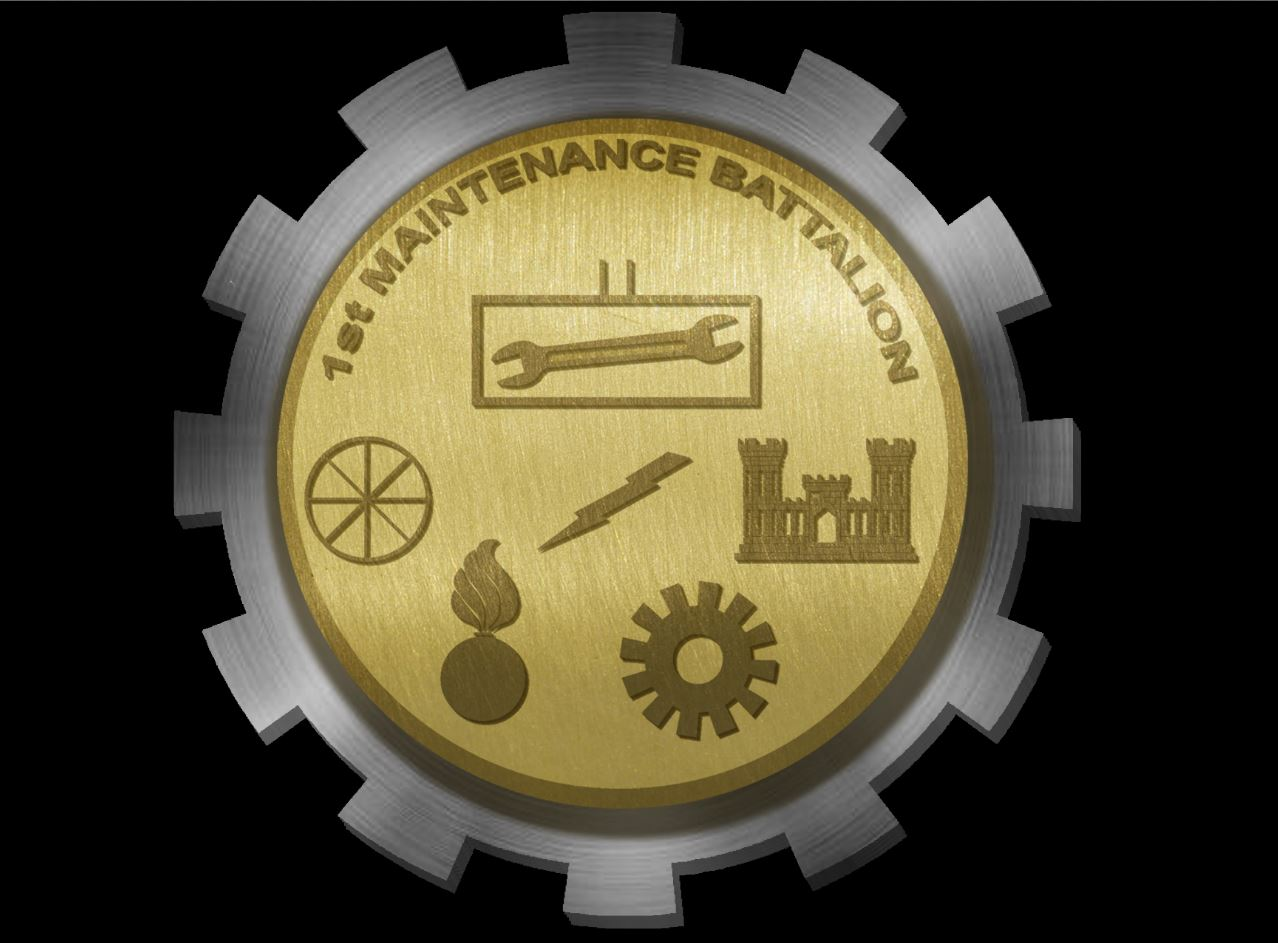
- 1st Maintenance Battalion insignia
- Active: 1 Oct 1947-19 Apr 1953 2 Jul 1953-
- Country: United States
- Branch: United States Marine Corps
- Role: Combat Service Support
- Part of: 1st Combat Readiness Regiment
- Garrison/HQ: Marine Corps Base Camp Pendleton
- Nickname: Warfighters
- Mottos: "Sustinare Fide et Fortitudine" - Support that is faithful and courageous.
- Mascot: Phoenix
- Engagements: Korean War; Vietnam War; Gulf War; Operation Restore Hope; Operation Iraqi Freedom * 2003 invasion of Iraq; Operation Enduring Freedom

Commanders
- Current commander: LtCol Zachary J. Pagan
- Sergeant Major: SgtMaj Gregory A. Reyst Jr.
- Notable commanders: SgtMaj Joseph J. Caputo 1stSgt Jacob Hayden

The 1st Maintenance Battalion is a battalion of the United States Marine Corps that provides intermediate-level maintenance for the I Marine Expeditionary Force's tactical ordnance, engineer, motor transport, communications electronics and general support ground equipment. The Marines and Sailors of 1st Maintenance Battalion are regularly assigned and deployed around the world with command elements that deliver tactical logistics support to I MEF units. The command is based out of Camp Las Pulgas, Marine Corps Base Camp Pendleton, California, and is organized under the command of the 1st Combat Readiness Regiment/1st Marine Logistics Group.

== Subordinate units ==
- Headquarters and Service Company (HSC)
- Tactical Maintenance Company (TMC)
- Ordnance Maintenance Company (OMC)
- Electronics Maintenance Company (ELMACO)
- Combat Logistics Company 16 (CLC-16)

== Mission ==
Provide intermediate level maintenance support, to include wheeled and tracked vehicle recovery, salvage and disposal, and general maintenance support, for I MEF's ground equipment in order to improve and sustain MAGTF's combat power. Provide Secondary Reparable Management, including inventory management, storage, financial accounting, and maintenance for secondary and low-density repairables.

== History ==
=== Organization ===
Maintenance Company, 1st Combat Service Group was commissioned on October 1, 1947 at Marine Corps Logistics Base Barstow, California. The battalion relocated to MCB Camp Pendleton, California during October 1947.

=== Korean War - 1964 ===
- Deployed During August 1950 To Kobe, Japan
- Redeployed During September 1950 To Inchon, Korea
- Participated in the Korean War, Operating From Inchon-Seoul, Chosin Reservoir, East Central Front, And Western Front
- Deactivated 19 April 1953
- Reactivated 2 July 1953 at Camp Pendleton, California as Motor Transport Support Battalion, 1st Combat Service Group, Service Command, Fleet Marine Force
- Redesignated 15 October 1954 As Maintenance Company, 1st Combat Service Group, Service Command, Fleet Marine Force
- Redesignated 30 December 1955 As Maintenance Company, 1st Combat Service Group, Fleet Marine Force
- Redesignated 1 April 1956 As Maintenance Battalion, 1st Combat Service Group, Fleet Marine Force
- Redesignated 1 March 1957 As Material Supply and Maintenance Battalion, 1st Force Service Regiment, Fleet Marine Force
- Redesignated 1 September 1964 As Maintenance Battalion, 1st Force Service Regiment, Fleet Marine Force

=== Vietnam War through 2002 ===
- Redesignated 15 February 1967 As Maintenance Battalion, 1st Force Service Regiment, Force Logistic Command, Fleet Marine Force
- Participated in The War in Vietnam, February 1967 - April 1971, Operating from Da Nang
- Redesignated 23 April 1971 As Maintenance Battalion, 1st Force Service Regiment, Fleet Marine Force and Relocated to Camp Pendleton, California
- Redesignated 30 March 1976 As 1st Maintenance Battalion, 1st Force Service Support Group, Fleet Marine Force
- Participated in Operations Desert Shield and Desert Storm, Southwest Asia, 1990-1991
- Participated in Operation Restore Hope, Somalia, December 1992-March 1993
- Numerous Elements Participated in Support of Contingency Operations from 1993-2002

=== Iraq, Afghanistan, and current operations ===
- Deployed to Kuwait in January 2003 in build-up and support of Operation Iraqi Freedom
- Participated in Operation Iraqi Freedom, Iraq, March–July 2003
- Participated in Operation Iraqi Freedom, Iraq, February 2004-September 2004
- Participated in Operation Iraqi Freedom, Iraq, October 2008-March 2009
- Participated in Operation Enduring Freedom, Afghanistan, April–August 2012

On 26 September 2014, 1st Maintenance Battalion was selected as the winner of the Secretary of Defense Field-level Maintenance Award in the large category. The awards was presented to the winners on November 18, 2014, in the Sheraton Birmingham Hotel, Birmingham, Alabama, during the awards ceremony that is part of the 2014 DoD Maintenance Symposium.

In 2020 the battalions higher headquarters, Combat Logistics Regiment 15, was disbanded as part of a larger reorganization of the Marine Corps. The battalion now falls directly under the 1st Marine Logistics Group.

== See also ==
- History of the United States Marine Corps
- List of United States Marine Corps battalions
