= Las Pulgas =

Las Pulgas is Spanish for The Fleas and may refer to:

- Camp Las Pulgas
- Las Pulgas Creek
- Las Pulgas Lake
- Las Pulgas Valley
- Rancho de las Pulgas
- Pulgas Water Temple
