= General Bullard =

General Bullard may refer to:

- John W. Bullard Jr. (fl. 1980s–2010s), U.S. Marine Corps brigadier general
- Robert Lee Bullard (1861–1947), U.S. Army lieutenant general
- Terry L. Bullard (fl. 1990s–2020s), U.S. Air Force brigadier general
