= Combat Logistics Regiment 17 =

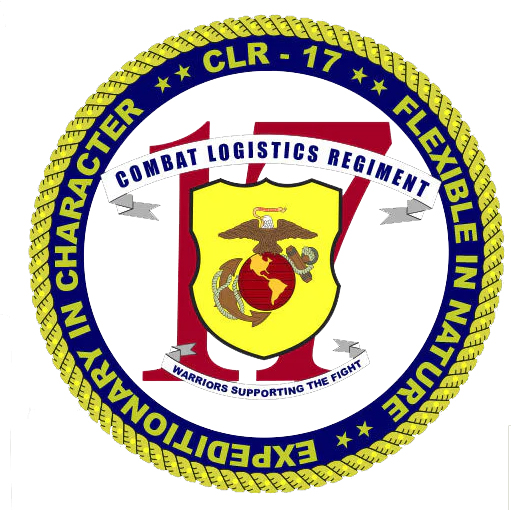
- CLR-17 insignia
- Country: United States
- Allegiance: United States of America
- Branch: United States Marine Corps
- Type: Logistics
- Part of: 1st Marine Logistics Group; I Marine Expeditionary Force
- Garrison/HQ: Marine Corps Base Camp Pendleton
- Mottos: "Expeditionary in Character, Flexible in Nature"

Commanders
- Current commander: Colonel Matthew K. Mulvey

Combat Logistics Regiment 17 (formerly designated as Headquarters Regiment, 1st Marine Logistics Group) is a logistics regiment of the United States Marine Corps. It is subordinate to the command of the 1st Marine Logistics Group (1st MLG), I Marine Expeditionary Force (I MEF). The unit is based out of Marine Corps Base Camp Pendleton, California.

== Mission ==
Provide command and control, administration, communications, food services, services, landing support and terminal operations and security support to the 1st MLG.

== Organization 2024 ==
As of March 2024 the Combat Logistics Regiment 17 consists of:

- Combat Logistics Regiment 17
  - Headquarters Company
  - Combat Logistics Battalion 11
  - Combat Logistics Battalion 13
  - Combat Logistics Battalion 15

== History ==
Originally activated on 2 August 1992 as First Force Service Support Group Forward (1st FSSG FWD),

Combat Logistics Regiment 17 began on 2 August 1992 at Camp Pendleton as 1st Force Service Support Group Forward (1st FSSG FWD). 1st FSSG had its first opportunity to deploy within the year with Operation Restore Hope in Somalia. 1st FSSG FWD fought in Somalia from December 1992 until February 1993 and from April to June 1993. For its service in Somalia, 1st FSSG FWD earned a Joint Meritorious Unit Award.

1st FSSG FWD was called on again in October 1994 when Saddam Hussein moved two Republican Guard divisions to the Kuwaiti border in October 1994. 1st FSSG FWD deployed to Saudi Arabia to support Operation Vigilant Warrior as the lead element for 1st FSSG. In late October 1994, the Iraqi's pulled back and 1st FSSG FWD earned a Meritorious Unit Commendation for its service. In a speech in Kuwait in 1994, President Clinton said to the Marines of 1st FSSG., "You got here in a very big hurry, and because of that, Iraq got the message in a very big hurry".

On 21 January 2003, 1st FSSG FWD was redesigned as Brigade Service Support Group 1 (BSSG 1). Colonel J. D. Grelson was the first Commanding Officer of BSSG 1. In preparation of the Invasion of Iraq, BSSG 1 deployed to Kuwait. CLR-17 supported the March to Baghdad, the defining event of Operation Iraqi Freedom. CLR-17 returned in September 2003, earning a presidential unit citation.

Combat Logistics Regiment 17 began on 31 Mar 2006, in the midst of Operation Iraqi Freedom II 05-07. Colonel David M. Richtsmeier was the first commanding officer of CLR-17. CLR-17 served in Operation Iraqi Freedom from 2006 to 2007. CLR-17 sent Marines and Sailors to Afghanistan in support of Operation Enduring Freedom in 2010 as well as in 2012. CLR-17 continues to send Marines and Sailors in support of Operation Enduring Freedom.

On 31 March 2014, Combat Logistics Regiment 17 was redesignated as Headquarters Regiment, 1st Marine Logistics Group – the name change was reversed in 2018.

== See also ==
- List of United States Marine Corps regiments
