= Smoke (donkey) =

Mascot and therapy animal for the United States Marine Corps

- Species: Donkey
- Sex: Male
- Born: Iraq
- Died: August 24, 2012; Take Flight Farms Omaha, Nebraska
- Owner: United States Marine Corps
- Appearance: Gray

Smoke, also known as Smoke the Donkey, was a donkey that was a mascot and therapy animal for the United States Marine Corps in 2008 to 2009, during the 2003 Iraq War. In 2011, he was relocated to Omaha, Nebraska in the United States, where he died of natural causes in 2012. His life has been the subject of a book and his process of relocating from Iraq has been contrasted with the process for humans.

== History ==
Smoke was a donkey found during the 2003 Iraq War. Marine Colonel John Folsom helped rescue the malnourished animal and built a corral and stable at Camp Taqaddum in Iraq from 2008 to 2009 among the Marines of the 1st Marine Logistics Group who were deployed there. Folsom found a Navy psychologist to designate Smoke as a therapy animal in order to address regulations against keeping the animal on the premises. The donkey became a popular mascot with the troops, who would send photos to children back home.

In 2011, Smoke traveled halfway around the world to the United States: the only donkey to make such a journey. The process to relocate Smoke from Iraq to the United States required senior level diplomatic coordination by multiple countries, and the assistance of the Society for the Prevention of Cruelty to Animals. Once in the United States, Smoke lived at Take Flight Farms in Omaha, Nebraska until his death on August 14, 2012, of natural causes.

== Analysis ==
Smoke's relatively quick visa process has been contrasted with the lengthy visa process for Iraqi humans who worked as interpreters for the US Army.

In 2016, Smoke the Donkey: A Marine's Unlikely Friend—a book about his life by Cate Folsom—was published by University of Nebraska Press.
