= 13th Marine Expeditionary Unit =

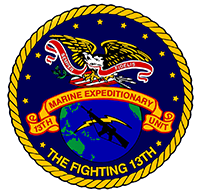
- 13th MEU Insignia
- Active: 1 February 1985 – present
- Country: United States
- Branch: United States Marine Corps
- Type: Marine expeditionary unit
- Role: Special Operations Capable - Marine Air Ground Task Force
- Size: 2,200
- Part of: I Marine Expeditionary Force
- Garrison/HQ: Marine Corps Base Camp Pendleton
- Nickname: "The Fighting 13th"
- Engagements: Operation Desert Storm; Operation Southern Watch War on terror: Operation Enduring Freedom; Operation Iraqi Freedom; Al-Qaeda insurgency in Yemen; Operation Inherent Resolve

Commanders
- Notable commanders: Col. Christopher J. Gunther Col. David W. Coffman; Col. Carl E. Mundy III; Col. Chandler S. Nelms; Col. Andrew T. Priddy; Col. Christopher D. Taylor; Col. Anthony M. Henderson Col. Samuel L. Meyer

The 13th Marine Expeditionary Unit (13th MEU) is one of seven Marine Expeditionary Units currently in existence in the United States Marine Corps. The Marine Expeditionary Unit is a Marine Air Ground Task Force with a strength of about 2,200 personnel. The MEU consists of a command element, a reinforced infantry battalion, a composite aviation squadron and a combat logistics battalion. The 13th MEU is currently based out of Marine Corps Base Camp Pendleton, California.

== Mission ==
The mission of the MEU is to provide geographic combatant commanders with a forward-deployed, rapid-response force capable of conducting conventional amphibious and selected maritime special operations at night or under adverse weather conditions from the sea, by surface and/or by air while under communications and electronics restrictions.

== Current subordinate units ==
- Ground Combat Element - 2nd Battalion, 4th Marines
- Aviation Combat Element - VMM-362 (REIN), VMFA-122 (-)
- Logistics Combat Element - Combat Logistics Battalion 13

== History ==
=== Early years ===
The 13th Marine Expeditionary Unit (MEU) was activated at Camp Pendleton, California, 1 February 1985, as the 13th Marine Amphibious Unit. The unit was renamed as the 13th MEU 5 February 1988. It is one of three West Coast MEUs which make periodic deployments to the Western Pacific, Indian Ocean and Persian Gulf regions. The "Fighting 13th" has experienced a number of firsts. It was the first West Coast MEU to be designated as Special Operations Capable, having trained to conduct a wide variety of special missions. It was the first MEU to deploy with Landing Craft Air Cushion (LCAC); an entire section of Avenger air defense weapons systems, the first to refuel ground vehicles with the Tactical Bulk Fuels Delivery System mounted in a CH-53E. Additionally, it was the first West Coast MEU to deploy with a force reconnaissance platoon, and the first to launch from an amphibious vessel USS Tarawa (LHA-1) and train with drone remotely piloted vehicles (as the 13th MAU in 1986).

=== 1990s ===
The 13th MEU’s special operations capabilities (SOC) were used extensively on its deployment during Operation Desert Shield and Operation Desert Storm. Beginning a routine deployment 20 June 1990, the MEU was diverted to Southwest Asia in August. The first amphibious force to arrive in the theater of operations, personnel conducted the first Marine offensive actions against Iraq. In October, elements boarded two Iraqi tankers that refused to obey United Nations sanctions.

The MEU’s last combat operation in Desert Storm was an Iraqi prisoner-of-war detainment on Faylaka Island, Kuwait, 3 March 1991, which resulted in 1,413 Iraqi prisoners being apprehended. The MEU returned to the United States 16 April, after being deployed 301 consecutive days.

The 13th MEU (SOC) deployed again in January 1992. During this deployment, the MEU conducted training operations in the Persian Gulf, Africa and Thailand. Additionally, the MEU was the last deploying unit to visit the Philippines prior to the closure of Naval Station Subic Bay prior to returning that summer. The 13th MEU (SOC) arrived off the coast of Somalia in early October 1993 in response to increasing hostilities there. As a key element of the newly formed COMMARFOR Somalia, the 13th MEU (SOC) and 22nd MEU (SOC), remained on station ready to provide support to United States and United Nations forces.

In mid-13 November MEU (SOC) became the principle rapid response force in the region and executed two humanitarian assistance operations. The first, Operation Show Care, took place in the cities of Marka and Qoryooley from 11–14 November. From 1–3 December, Operation More Care was conducted in the Old Port of Mogadishu. Both operations provided needed medical and dental assistance to Somali citizens.

The 13th MEU (SOC) continued its presence mission through January 1994, providing aircraft for the "Eyes Over Mogadishu" missions as well as sniper support at the United States Embassy compound. The 13th MEU returned to the United States 17 March.

The MEU deployed again 25 October, only seven months after returning to Camp Pendleton. Following a scheduled exercise on Okinawa, 11–13 November, the MEU sailed to the Persian Gulf. During this period the MEU conducted a Maritime Interdiction Operation/Visit Board Search and Seizure (MIO/VBSS) mission aboard the Honduran-flagged merchant vessel Ajmer, which was in violation of United Nations sanctions on Iraq.

In January 1995, the 13th MEU (SOC) was ordered to conduct Operation United Shield - the withdrawal of UNOSOM forces from Somalia. The MEU sailed to Africa and conducted operation rehearsals in Kenya. On 28 February, the 13th MEU (SOC) conducted an amphibious assault onto Somali soil and executed a relief-in-place with UNOSOM forces. By 2 March, the withdrawal of all UNOSOM forces was complete, and during the first hours of 3 March, the final Marine forces departed Somali soil. The 13th MEU (SOC) returned to Camp Pendleton 24 April.

The MEU departed on its ninth deployment 19 April 1996. During an MEU exercise in Kuwait, the MEU became the first MEU(SOC) to put the entire landing force ashore in Kuwait without the use of a port or airfield. This was a vital step in the validation of the plan for the defense of Kuwait, which had previously not been tested.

The "Fighting 13th" returned to Camp Pendleton to end its deployment 18 October. The 13th MEU(SOC) began its tenth deployment 29 August 1997. During WESTPAC 98-1, the MEU participated in Operation Southern Watch during November and December, helping enforce the no-fly zone over southern Iraq. The MEU returned home 28 February, 1998.

5 December 1998, began WESTPAC 99-1. During deployment, the MEU conducted training in Hawaii, Singapore and Kuwait. MEU Marines provided reinforcements to the U.S. Embassy in Kenya and responded to the Eritrea-Ethiopia war.

While deployed in the WESTPAC from 14–16 September 2000, the MEU conducted a humanitarian assistance operation in East Timor, offloading more than 570 tons of material by aircraft and more than 430 tons via sea lift.

In October 2000, the 13th MEU was dispatched to provide security and assist in Operation Determined Response, the recovery of the crippled destroyer USS Cole in the port of Aden, Yemen. The MEU marked its transit home with a stop on Iwo Jima, and Tarawa, returning to Camp Pendleton 13 February 2001.

=== Global war on terror ===
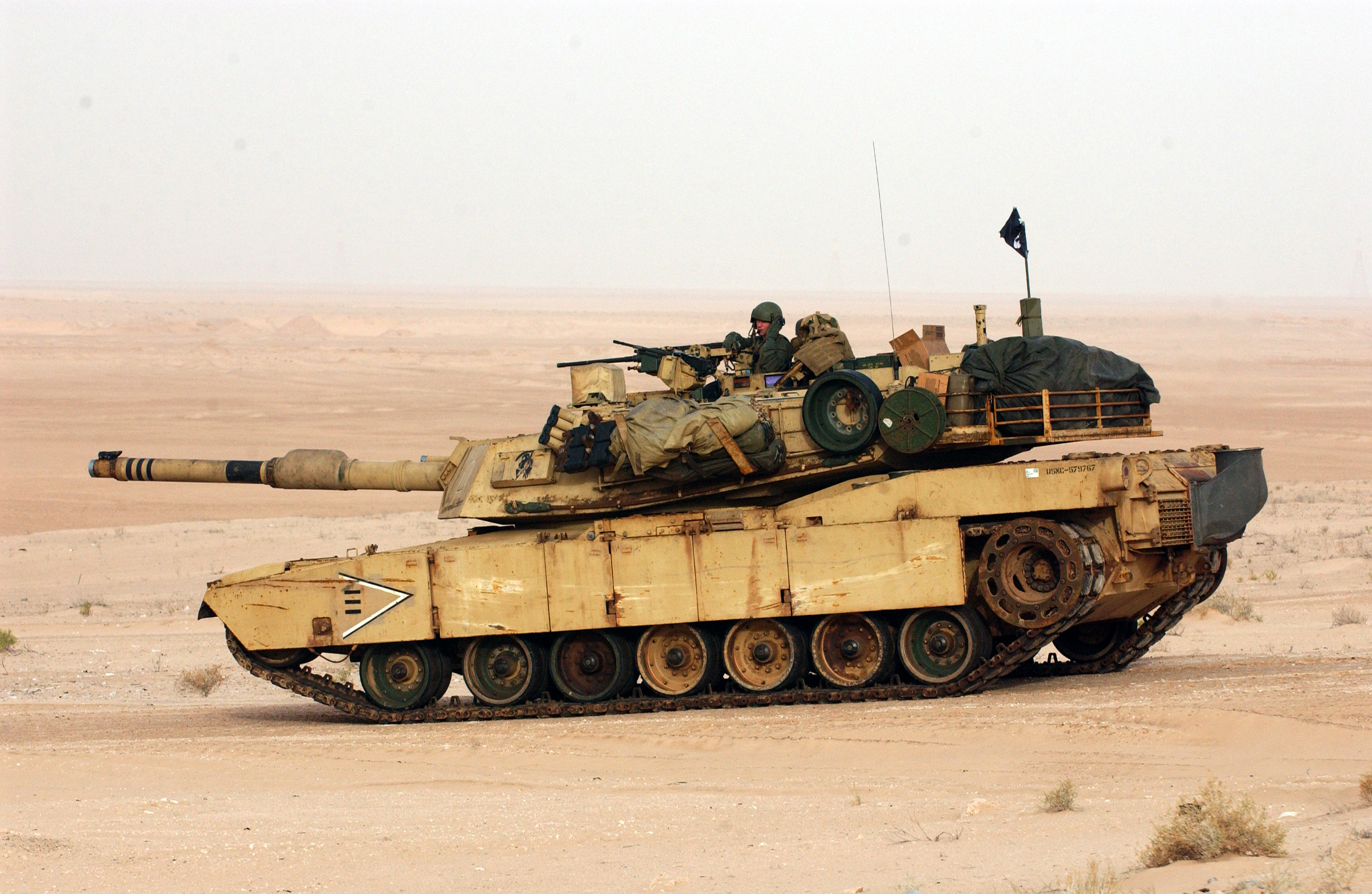
An M1A1 Abrams tank from the 13th MEU in United Arab Emirates in December 2003.

The "Fighting 13th’s" thirteenth deployment began six weeks early when it departed 1 December 2001, in response to Operation Enduring Freedom being conducted in Afghanistan. Aircraft from HMM-165 (Rein) played an integral part in the air war conducted during Operation Enduring Freedom and provided the primary air support during Operation Anaconda in the early months of 2002. In addition to the 13th MEU (SOC)’s role in Operations Enduring Freedom and Anaconda, the MEU conducted humanitarian assistance operations in Kenya. While in Kenya the MEU built bridges, improved and built school structures, dug a well, and improved structures at a maternity hospital. Medical and dental aid and education were provided to the local population by MEU medical staff and bilateral training was conducted with Kenyan forces. The MEU conducted separate bilateral training exercises with Qatari and Omani forces prior to returning to Camp Pendleton 17 June 2002.

On 6 May 2016, it was reported that over 2,000 to 4,500 Marines from the 13th MEU were staged on the USS Boxer off the coast of Yemen to provide support to coalition forces in Yemen fighting AQAP militants. On 16 June 2016, AV-8B II+ Harriers of the 13th MEU flying from the USS Boxer in the Persian Gulf began airstrikes on ISIL in Iraq and Syria as part of Operation Inherent Resolve.

== See also ==
- Marine Air-Ground Task Force
- List of Marine Expeditionary Units
- Organization of the United States Marine Corps
