= Combat Logistics Battalion 11 =

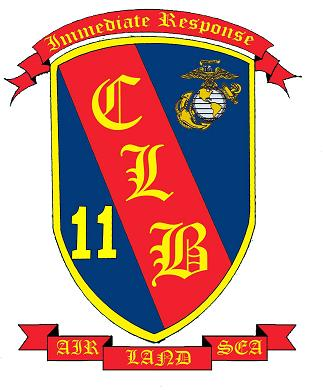
- CLB-11 Insignia
- Country: United States
- Allegiance: United States of America
- Branch: United States Marine Corps
- Type: Logistics
- Part of: 11th Marine Expeditionary Unit; Combat Logistics Regiment 17
- Garrison/HQ: Marine Corps Base Camp Pendleton
- Nickname(s): Workhorse
- Motto(s): Immediate Response – Air Land Sea
- Engagements: Operation Desert Storm; Operation Iraqi Freedom; Operation Inherent Resolve

Commanders
- Current commander: LtCol Robert J. Hillery

Combat Logistics Battalion 11 (CLB-11) is a logistics battalion of the United States Marine Corps. When not deployed they are part of Headquarters Regiment, 1st Marine Logistics Group. The unit is based out of the Marine Corps Base Camp Pendleton, California and when deployed provides combat logistical support to the 11th Marine Expeditionary Unit (11th MEU).

== Mission ==
Provide tactical logistics support beyond the organic capabilities of supported elements of the 11th Marine Expeditionary Unit.

== Subordinate Units ==
- Headquarters: S-1, S-2/3, S-4 (Food Service, Embark, Ammunition), Postal, Disbursing
- Communications Platoon (Transmission, Network Administrator, Data Systems Administrator)
- Landing Support Platoon "The Red Patchers"
- Motor Transport Platoon
- Engineer Platoon (Combat Engineers, Heavy Equipment, Bulk Water, Bulk Fuel, Utilities)
- Maintenance Platoon (Motor Transport, Engineer, Ordnance, Communication)
- Supply Platoon (Organic, Intermediate Consumable, Secondary Reparable)
- Health Services Platoon (Battalion Aid Station, Dental, Shock Trauma)
- Explosive Ordnance Disposal Section
- Air Delivery Section

== History ==
Marine Amphibious Unit Service Support Group 11 (MSSG-11) was commissioned in May 1984 at Marine Corps Base Camp Pendleton under the command of the 1st Force Service Support Group. The Group was re-designated on 5 February 1988 as Marine Expeditionary Unit Service Support Group 11. From January through April 1991 the group supported 11th MEU operations in support of Operation Desert Shield and Desert Storm. The following year, MSSG-11 participated in operations supporting Operation Restore Hope in Somalia. Following that, in April 1994, MSSG-11 supported Operation Distant Runner, the Non-combatant evacuation operation (NEO) that took place in Rwanda.

In June 1998, MSSG-11, as part of the 11th MEU, supported a NEO in Asmara, Eritrea in response to the outbreak of the Eritrean–Ethiopian War. The codename for the evacuation was Operation Safe Departure. During the unit's next float, it took part in Operation Stabilise in East Timor from October–November 1999, and again in November 2002. From August through October 2002 the unit supported humanitarian operations in Djibouti. The battalion next supported combat operations in Iraq during the 2003 invasion of Iraq from March until June 2003. It would deploy again to Iraq from June 2004 until February 2005, and from April to July 2006. On 17 August 2006. MSSG-11 was re-designated as Combat Logistics Battalion 11 and reassigned to Combat Logistics Regiment 17, 1st Marine Logistics Group.

== See also ==
- List of United States Marine Corps battalions
- Organization of the United States Marine Corps
