= Combat Logistics Battalion 13 =

- Old MSSG-13 insignia
- Active: 6 January 1985 – present
- Country: United States
- Allegiance: United States of America
- Branch: United States Marine Corps
- Type: Logistics
- Part of: Combat Logistics Regiment 17; 1st Marine Logistics Group
- Garrison/HQ: Marine Corps Base Camp Pendleton
- Nickname: Lucky
- Engagements: Gulf War; Iraq War

Commanders
- Current commander: LtCol Brian McCarthy

Combat Logistics Battalion 13 (CLB-13) is a logistics battalion of the United States Marine Corps. In garrison, it falls under the command of Combat Logistics Regiment 17 and the 1st Marine Logistics Group; however, when deployed, it forms the logistics combat element of the 13th Marine Expeditionary Unit. The battalion is based out of the Marine Corps Base Camp Pendleton, California.

== Mission ==
- Provide combat service support to Marine forces in the Southern California Area of Operations in order to sustain air and ground operations.
- Accept augmenting forces to form a Battalion Service Support Group.
- Provide a full range of expeditionary combat service support in direct support to the Ground Combat Element, Aviation Combat Element, or Command Element of 13th MEU in order to enable the accomplishment of all assigned missions across a wide spectrum of conventional and selected maritime special operations. Be prepared to conduct simultaneous, self-sufficient tactical security operations in order to ensure that the provision of this support is not interrupted in a hostile environment.

== Subordinate units ==
- Headquarters and Service Company
- General Service Company
- Alpha Company
- Bravo Company

== History ==
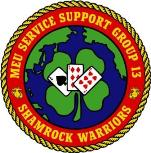
Old MSSG-13 insignia.

• Activated 6 January 1985 at camp pendleton, California, as marine amphibious unit • Service support group 13 and assigned to the 1st force service support group, • Fleet marine force, pacific.

• Redesignated 5 February 1988 as marine expeditionary unit service support group 13 • Participated in operations desert shield and desert storm, southwest Asia, • September–November 1990 and January–March 1991.

• Participated in support of operations in Somalia, October 1993 – February 1994.

• Participated in operation united shield, Somalia, February–March 1995.

• Participated in operation southern watch, southwest Asia, November 1997 – January 1998.

• Participated in operation determined response, Yemen, October–December 2000.

• Participated in operation enduring freedom, Afghanistan and Pakistan, March 2002.

• Participated in operation Iraqi freedom, Iraq, October–December 2005 and April–November 2007. • Redesignated 18 May 2006 as combat logistics battalion 13 and reassigned to • Combat logistics regiment 17, 1st marine logistics group.

== See also ==
- List of United States Marine Corps battalions
- Organization of the United States Marine Corps
