= John W. Bullard Jr. =

United States Marine Corps general

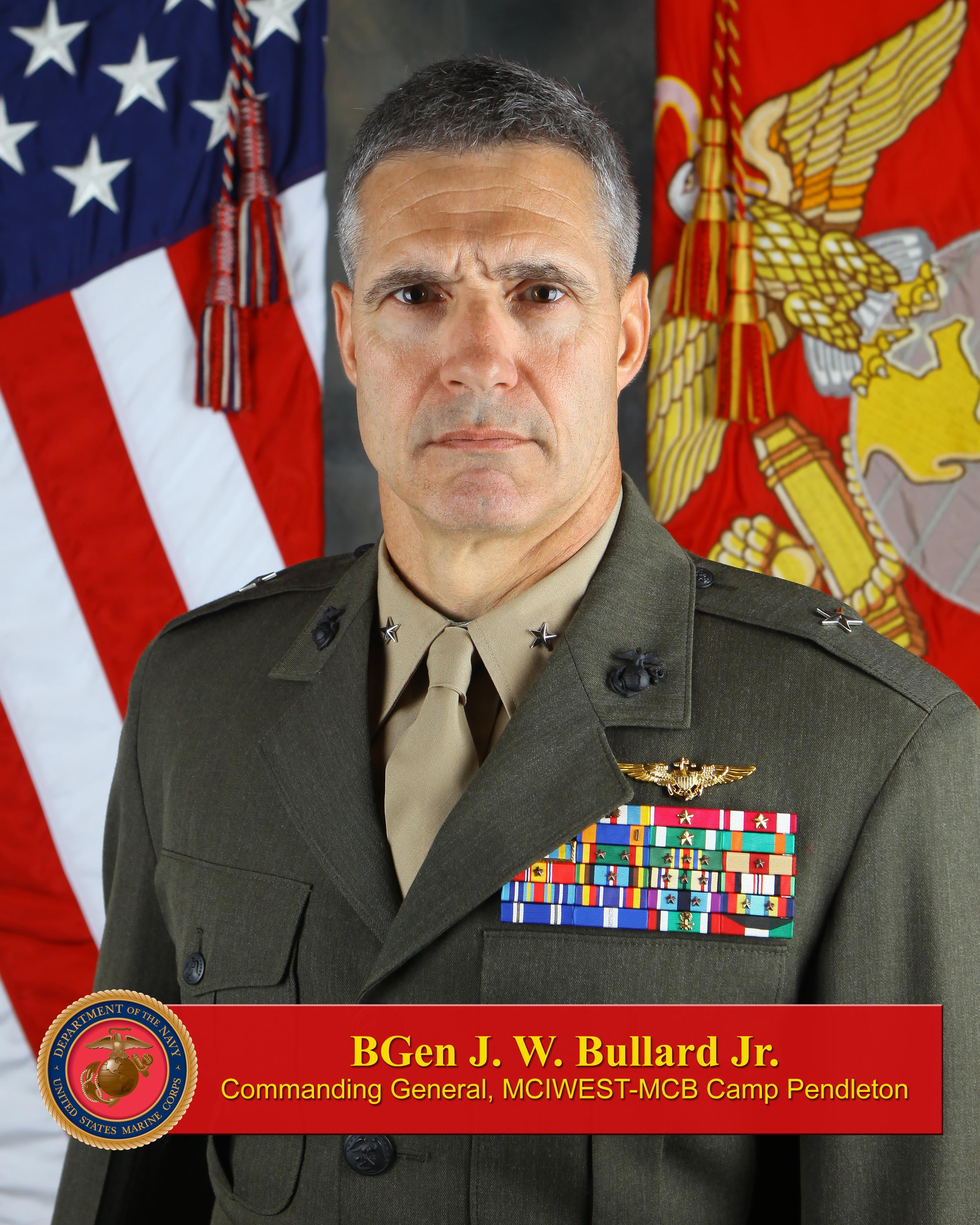
- Military career
- Allegiance: United States of America
- Branch: United States Marine Corps
- Service years: 1983–2014
- Rank: Brigadier General
- Commands: 11th Marine Expeditionary Unit
- Conflicts: War in Afghanistan
- Awards: Defense Superior Service Medal; Legion of Merit

John W. Bullard Jr. is a retired U.S. Marine brigadier general who served as the commander of the 11th Marine Expeditionary Unit and Commanding General, Marine Corps Installations West - Marine Corps Base Camp Pendleton. Commissioned in 1983, his general officer assignments also included serving as Commander of NATO Headquarters Sarajevo and Deputy Commander of Regional Command North in Afghanistan.

== Marine Corps career ==
Bullard was commissioned in the United States Marine Corps as a second lieutenant in 1983 after graduation from Virginia Tech and Officer Candidate School. He graduated from The Basic School at Marine Corps Base Quantico and received assignment to Naval Air Station Pensacola for flight training. He was designated a Naval Aviator in 1985. His operational assignments include CH-46 training at MCAS New River followed by service with VMM-263, VMM-161 and VMM-774. He deployed with 26th MEU and 24th MEU aboard the USS Guadalcanal where he participated in Operation Earnest Will in 1987.

His staff and command assignments include CH-46 division head, Marine Aviation Weapons and Tactics Squadron 1 from 1989 to 1993; Aviation Combat Element leader for 13th MEU (SOC) aboard USS Essex; Executive Officer of Marine Aircraft Group 16; student, Marine Corps Command and Staff College from 1996 to 1997; Aide-de-Camp to Deputy Commandant for Aviation; Commanding Officer of VMM-161 from May 2000 to December 2001; student, Air War College from 2002 to 2003; Aviation Department's Joint Doctrine, and Budget Branch, HQMC; Plans officer at United States Central Command; Commanding Officer of 11th Marine Expeditionary Unit from May 2005 to June 2008 and Branch Head of Marine Aviation Weapons Systems Requirements Branch for Headquarters Marine Corps. As a general officer, Bullard was Commander of NATO Headquarters Sarajevo; Deputy Commander of Regional Command North in Afghanistan and later Deputy Commanding General, Marine Corps Combat Development Command. His final assignment was Commanding General, Marine Corps Installations West - Marine Corps Base Camp Pendleton from 2012 to 2014.

== Awards and decorations ==
U.S. military decorations
Defense Superior Service Medal with oak leaf cluster
Legion of Merit with gold award star
Meritorious Service Medal with gold award star
Air Medal
Navy and Marine Corps Commendation Medal with gold award star
Navy Achievement Medal
U.S. Unit Awards
Joint Meritorious Unit Award
Navy Unit Commendation with two bronze campaign stars
Navy Meritorious Unit Commendation with three bronze campaign stars
U.S. Service (Campaign) Medals and Service and Training Ribbons
Marine Corps Expeditionary Medal with bronze service star
National Defense Service Medal with bronze service star
Armed Forces Expeditionary Medal with bronze service star
Southwest Asia Service Medal with three bronze campaign stars
Afghanistan Campaign Medal
Global War on Terrorism Expeditionary Medal
Global War on Terrorism Service Medal
Humanitarian Service Medal with two bronze service stars
Sea Service Deployment Ribbon with silver and bronze service star
NATO Medal Article 5 for service with ISAF
NATO Medal Non-Article 5 medal for the Balkans
Kuwait Liberation Medal (Saudi Arabia)
Kuwait Liberation Medal (Kuwait)

U.S. badges, patches and tabs
Naval Aviator Insignia
Rifle Sharpshooter Badge
Pistol Expert Badge
Office of the Joint Chiefs of Staff Identification Badge
