= Camp Las Pulgas =

Former World War 2 US Marines camp in California

Coordinates: 33.335000°N 117.420278°W

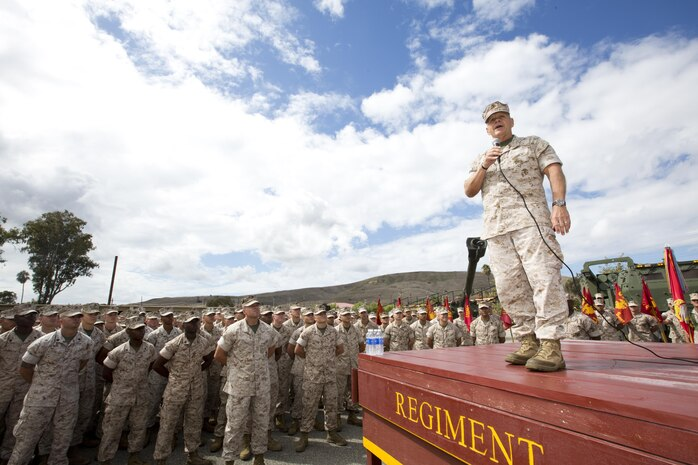
Commandant of the Marine Corps, General Robert Neller, speaks to Marines at the Las Pulgas Parade Deck, Camp Pendleton on Oct. 5, 2015

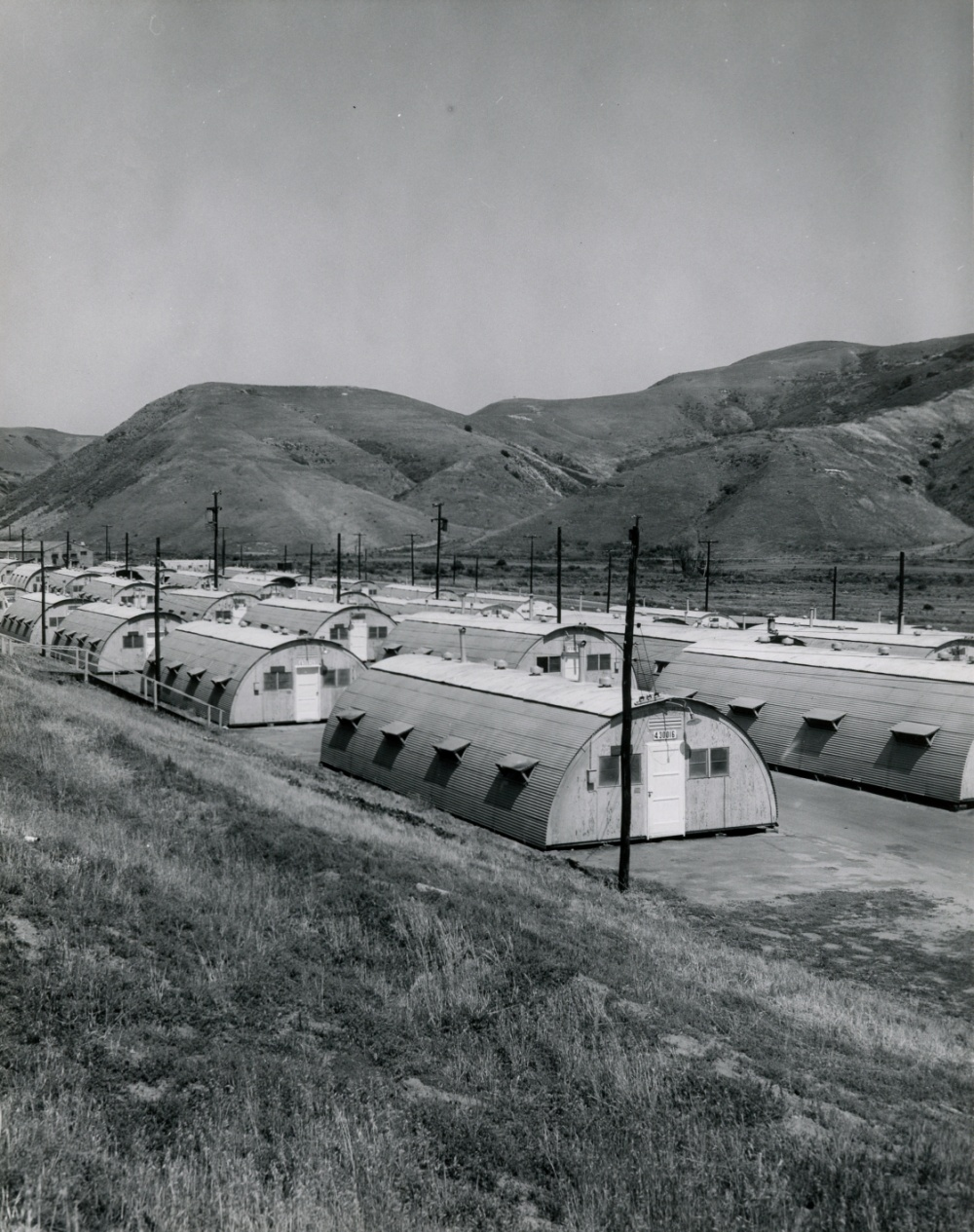
Quonset huts at Camp Las Pulgas in 1964 at Camp Pendleton

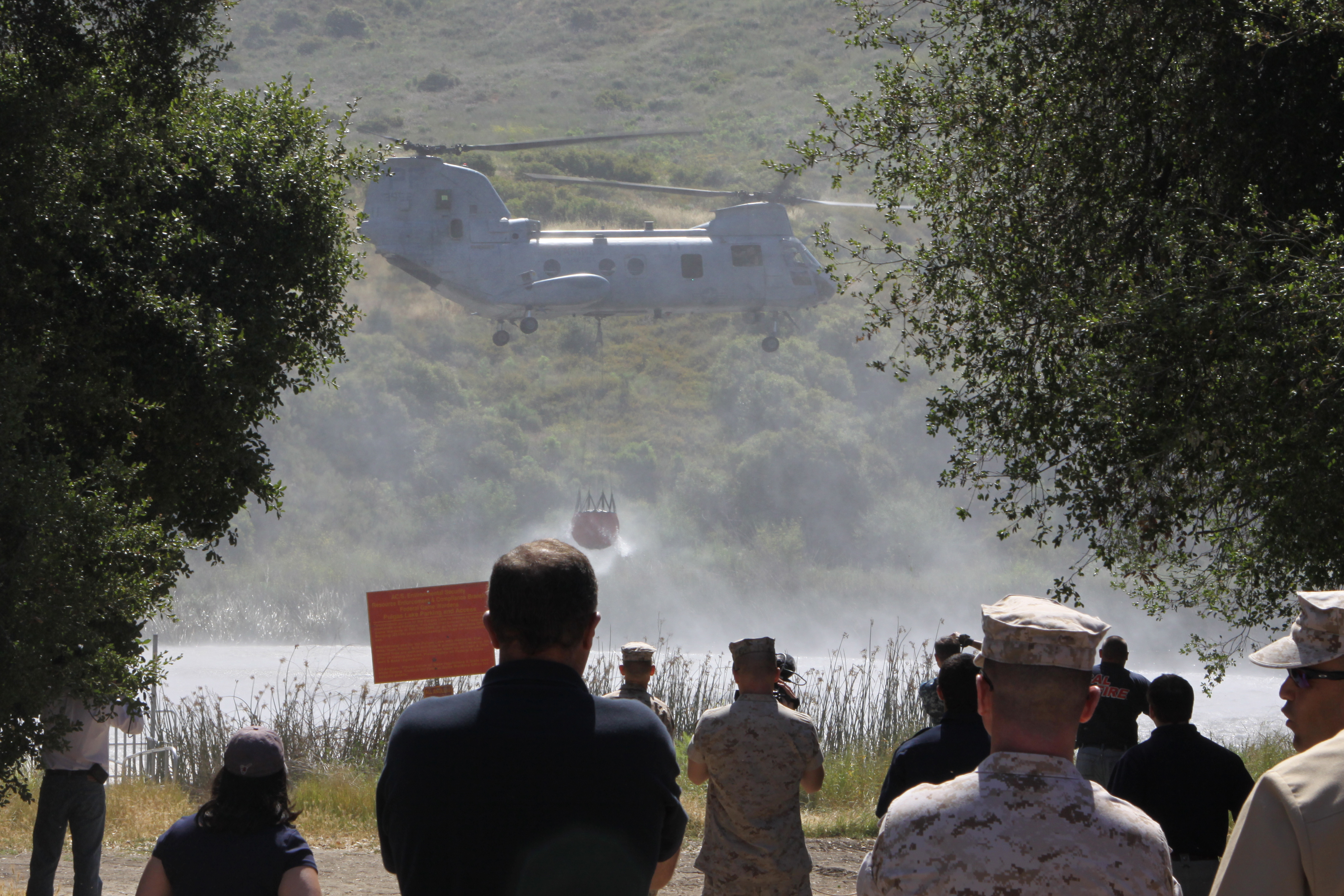
Las Pulgas Lake Fire Drill at Camp Pendleton

Camp Las Pulgas, also called 43 Area Camp Pendleton, is subcamp of Marine Corps Base Camp Pendleton. The camp was built during World War II. It was used for training US Marines before departing to the Pacific War and housed them upon their return. The camp had a mix of tents and quonset huts. Las Pulgas is Spanish for The Fleas.

The World War II, Korean War, and Vietnam War tent camp was called Camp Las Pulgas Bivouac Area and Tent Camp 1. This area is now the parking lot for Camp Pendleton's Combat Convoy Simulator and the Training Support Division.

In 1971 the camp became the home of the 11th Marine Regiment. The 11th Marine Regiment is the artillery division of the 1st Marine Division. The camp is also home to the 1st Maintenance Battalion. Also at Camp Las Pulgas - 43 Area is: Pulgas Lake, Las Pulgas Park, 11th Marine Armory, 43 Area Dental Clinic, Las Pulgas Barber Shop, 43 Area Fitness Center, 43 Area Pool, 43 Area Branch Medical Clinic, 43 Area SMP Single Marine Program Recreation Center, 43 Area Training Tank, and a United States Postal Office.

== History ==
Gaspar de Portolá's expedition with Junípero Serra and Joan Crespí camped at the spot in 1769. Father Crespí named the place La Canada de los Rosales or Rose Canyon, after seeing the wild Castilian roses that grew in the canyon. A few years later a Mission San Luis Rey de Francia survey party camped at the canyon and found and were hurt by many fleas, thus Camp Las Pulgas. The area became part of the vast California Spanish missions. With the Mexican secularization act of 1833 the land became grazing land for Andrés Pico and Pío Pico. In 1844 this became Rancho Santa Margarita y Las Flores. Andrés Pico used the land as his headquarters in the Mexican–American War. His troops fought in the Battle of San Pasqual in December 1846. After the war the land returned to grazing.

== See also ==
- California during World War II
- American Theater (1939–1945)
- United States home front during World War II
