= 11th Marine Expeditionary Unit =

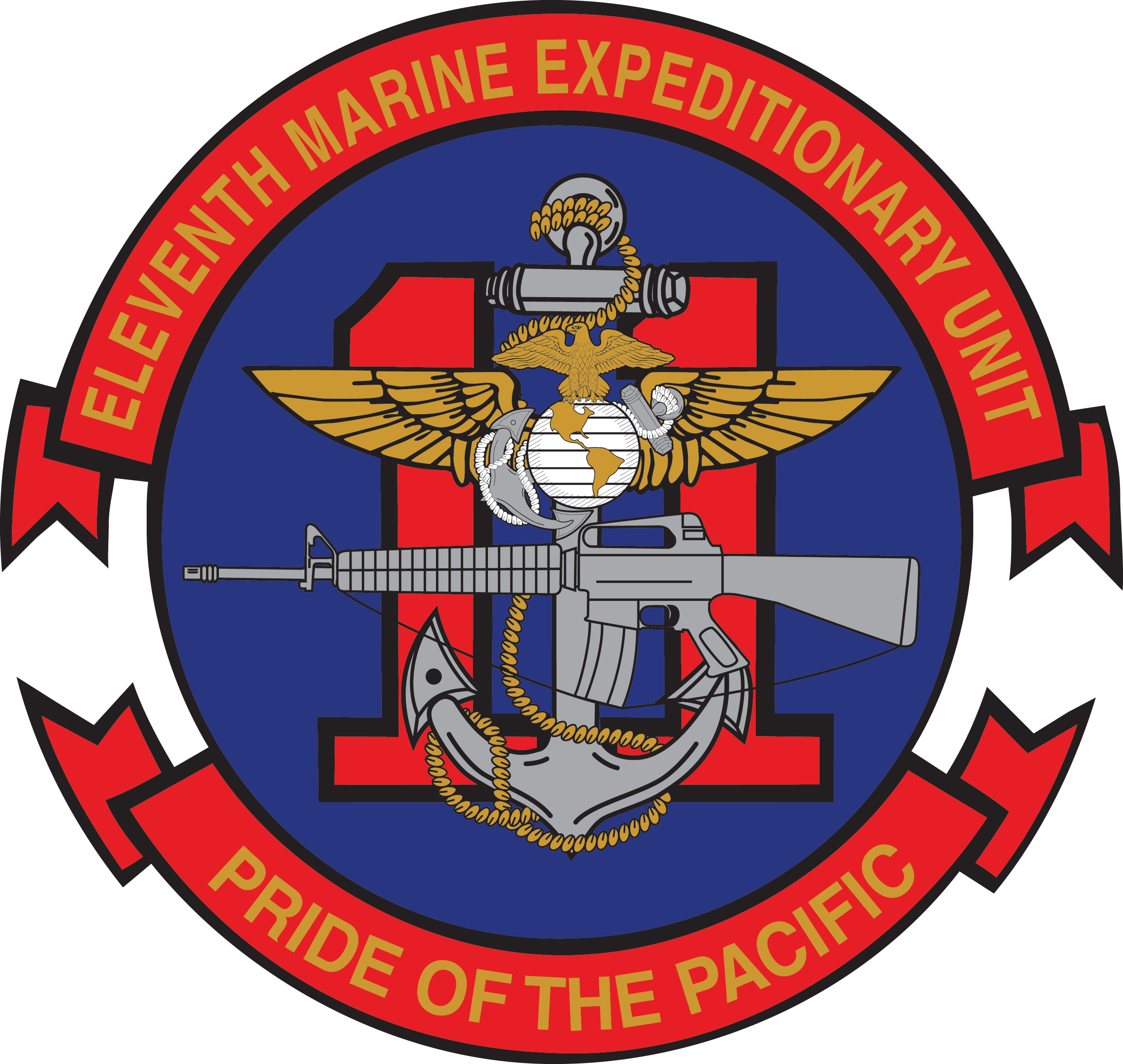
- 11th Marine Expeditionary Unit insignia
- Active: 13 April 1979 – present
- Country: United States
- Branch: United States Marine Corps
- Type: Special Operations Capable – Marine Air Ground Task Force
- Role: Forward-deployed, rapid-response force
- Size: 2,200
- Part of: I Marine Expeditionary Force
- Garrison/HQ: Marine Corps Base Camp Pendleton
- Nickname: "Pride of the Pacific"
- Engagements: Operation Stabilise; War on terror: Iraq War; Operation Inherent Resolve; Iran War

Commanders
- Commanding Officer: Col Caleb Hyatt
- Sergeant Major: SgtMaj Janet Marrufo

The 11th Marine Expeditionary Unit (11th MEU) is one of seven Marine Expeditionary Units currently in existence in the United States Marine Corps. The Marine Expeditionary Unit is a Marine Air Ground Task Force with a strength of about 2,200 personnel. The MEU consists of a command element, a reinforced infantry battalion, a composite helicopter squadron and a logistics combat element. The 11th MEU is currently based at Marine Corps Base Camp Pendleton, California with headquarters in Camp Del Mar.

== Mission ==
The mission of the MEU is to provide geographic combatant commanders with a forward-deployed, rapid-response force capable of conducting conventional amphibious and selected maritime special operations at night or under adverse weather conditions from the sea, by surface and/or by air while under communications and electronics restrictions.

== Current subordinate units ==
- Ground Combat Element: 1st Bn, 1st Marines
- Aviation Combat Element: VMM-163 (Rein)
- Logistics Combat Element: Combat Logistics Battalion 11

== History ==
=== Early years ===
The 11th Marine Expeditionary Unit (MEU), originally designated the 17th Marine Amphibious Unit (MAU), formed at Camp Pendleton, California on 13 April 1979.

The MAU was created to plan and participate in large-scale amphibious training exercises. In its early days, the unit also fulfilled requirements for a west coast based MAU to respond to contingencies, but was normally activated and deactivated based largely upon scheduled amphibious landing exercises directed by the Commander, Third Fleet. During this time, the billet of MAU Commanding Officer alternated between Regimental and Aircraft Group Commanders who filled the billet in six-month increments as a secondary duty during their tenures in command.

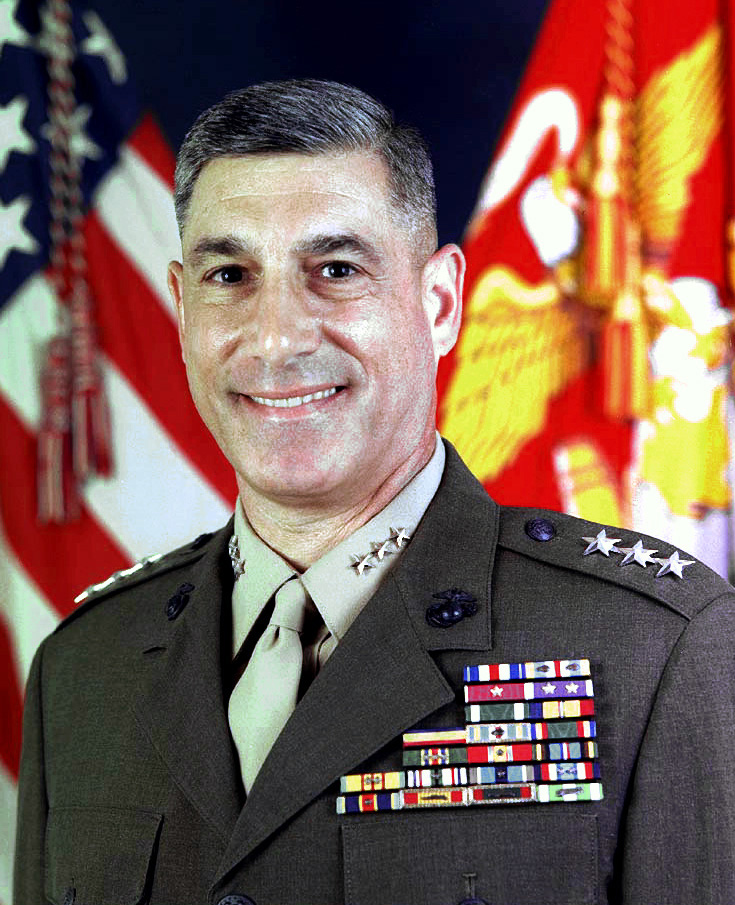
Frank Libutti, commanding officer 11th MEU from 1988 to 1990

In 1983, the Marine Corps directed a change that resulted in the first renaming of the 17th MAU. The decision was made to "source" the continuously deployed Western Pacific (WESTPAC) MAUs from I Marine Amphibious Force units in Southern California. Previously, their units came from the 1st Marine Brigade in Hawaii. This resulted in the renaming of the 17th MAU to the 11th MAU on 20 July 1984.

A second name change took place on 5 February 1988, when the Marine Corps more clearly defined the multiple capabilities of its Marine Air-Ground Task Forces. "Amphibious" was changed to "Expeditionary," and the unit was given its current designation – the 11th Marine Expeditionary Unit.

While the unit's designation has changed, the mission of the 11th MEU has remained largely unchanged. The MEU is an expeditionary intervention force with the ability to move quickly on short notice, to wherever needed to accomplish conventional or special operations. The strength of the MEU (Special Operations Capable) resides in the inherent combined arms capability while operating from forward-deployed amphibious shipping.

=== 1990s ===
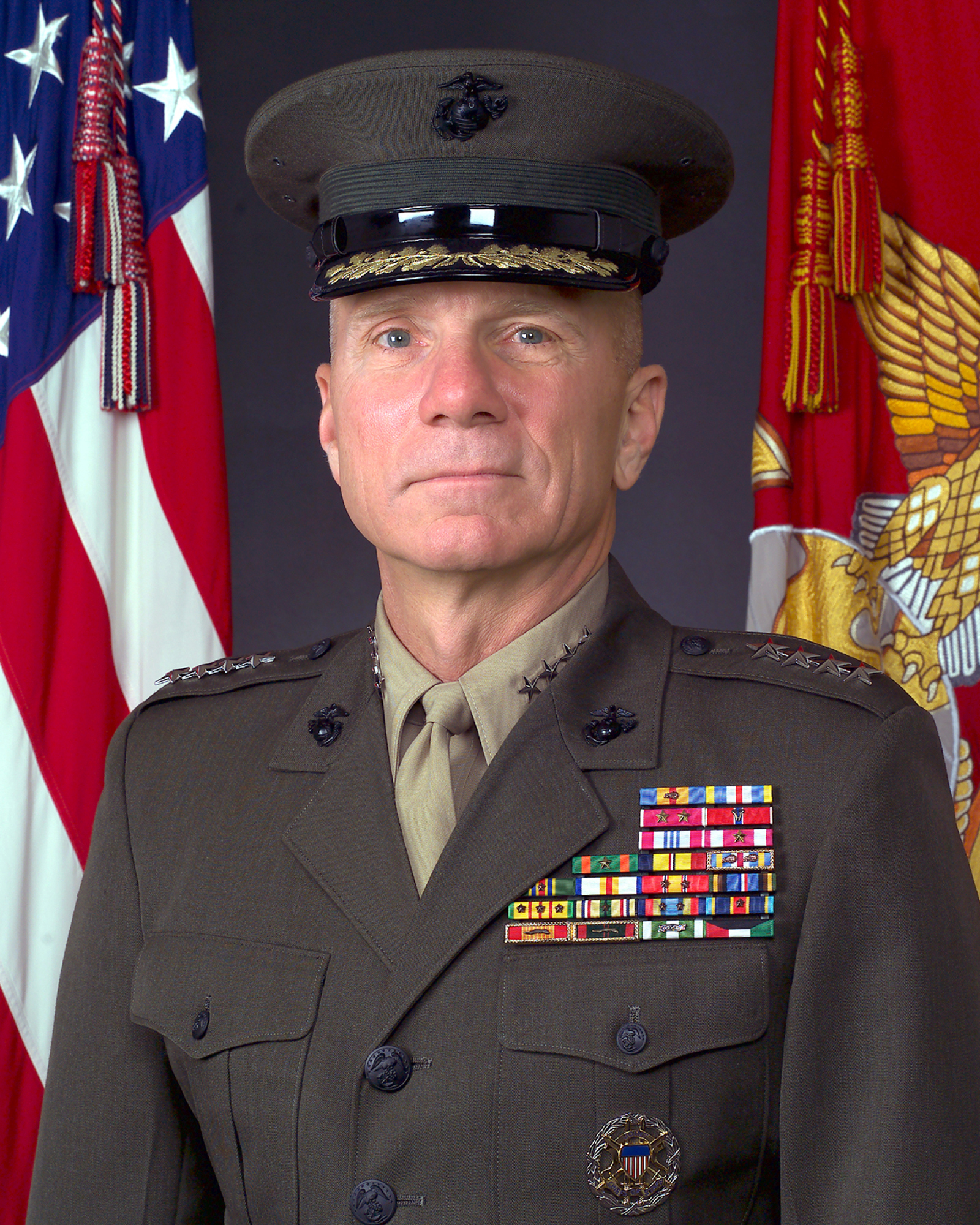
Michael W. Hagee, commanding officer 11th MEU from 1992 to 1993

In order to accomplish this mission, the MEU's continually train to maintain the required combat readiness, while simultaneously fulfilling worldwide training and contingency commitments. The 11th MEU has completed several major deployments to the Western Pacific, Indian Ocean, and Persian Gulf. It has participated in numerous training exercises/operations from the coast of California to the shores of Somalia, and as far inland as Bujumbura, Burundi and in Central Africa.

From January–April 1991, the 11th MEU formed the main portion of the Command Element of the reconstituted 5th Marine Expeditionary Brigade and participated in Operations Desert Shield and Desert Storm, Southwest Asia. The 11th MEU was an integral component of the Amphibious deception plan that fixed a number of Iraqi divisions on the coast to defend against an expected amphibious assault. As the invasion of Kuwait grew imminent, portions of the MEU landed at Al Mishab and Al Jubayl to act as the 1st MEF reserve. After the liberation of Kuwait, the 11th MEU was re-formed and stayed in the Persian Gulf after Desert Storm for a number of months performing a presence mission, finally returning to Camp Pendleton in late summer of 1991.

In 1995, the 11th MEU(SOC) participated in the exfiltration of General Hussein Kamel Hassan al-Majid and his brother, an Iraqi Colonel. Both were married to Saddam's daughters and were his 2nd Cousins. The families defected under the support and cover of the 11th MEU(SOC) and were escorted to King Hussein of Jordan. Transfer and delivery of the defectors was at the Jordanian King Faisal Air Force Base, where King Hussein of Jordan kept a personal ready room.

During its 1998 deployment, the 11th MEU conducted Operation Safe Departure. This was a Noncombatant Evacuation Operation, which took place in Asmara, Eritrea, on 6 June 1998. The evacuation of noncombatant civilians and third-world nationals was conducted as a precautionary measure to ensure their safety in the midst of a heated border dispute between Eritrea and Ethiopia. All total, 172 persons, to include 105 Americans, were safely evacuated to Amman, Jordan, via KC-130 aerial transport.

During its 1999 deployment, the 11th MEU supported Operation Stabilise in East Timor from 25 October 1999 to 27 November 1999. The MEU was called on to provide support to International Forces, East Timor (INTERFET), delivering more than 1.5 million pounds of food and supplies to the Australian-led peacekeeping forces and East Timorese.

=== Iraq ===
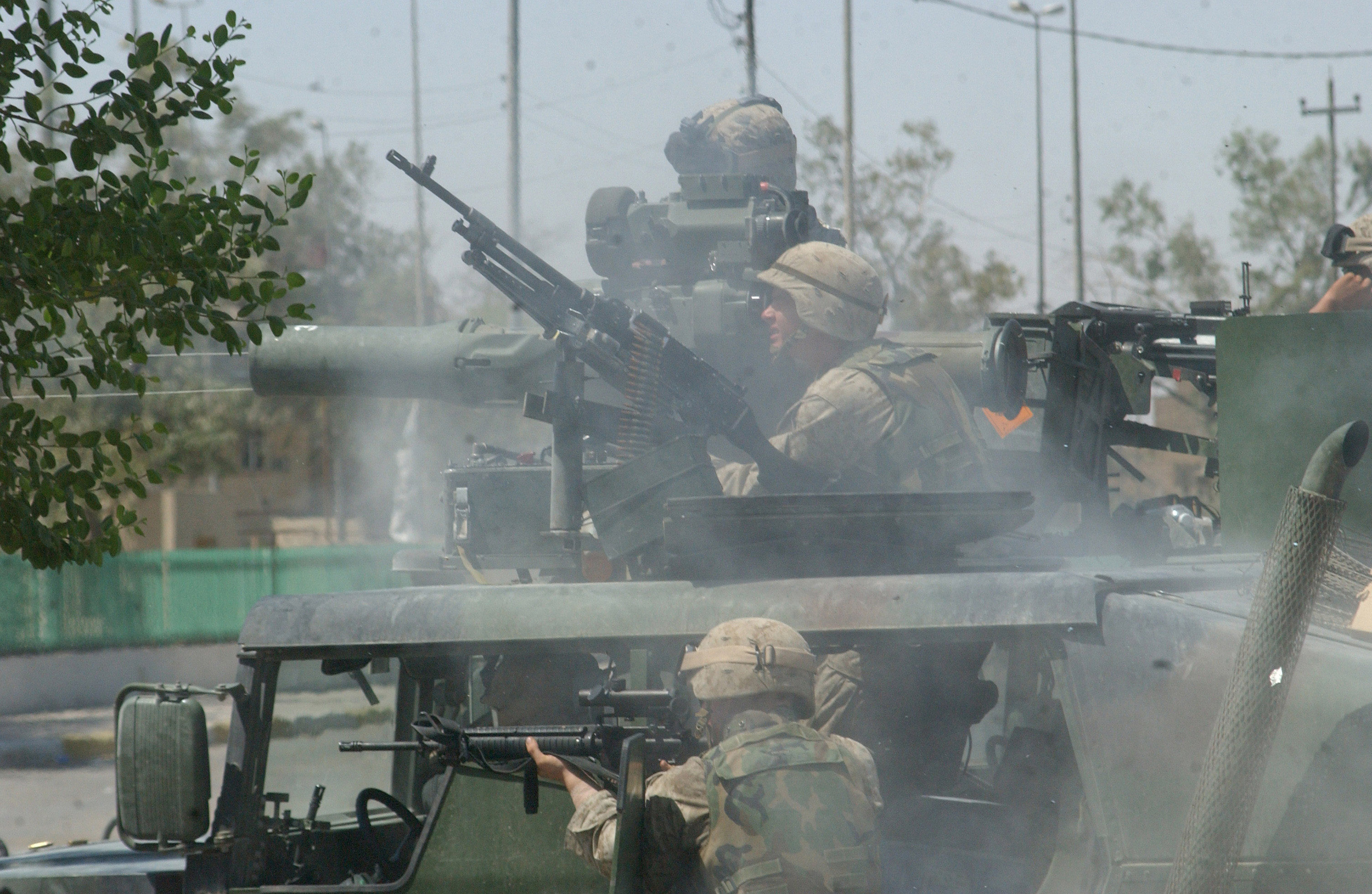
11th MEU Marines in combat during the Battle of Najaf, Iraq, August 5, 2004

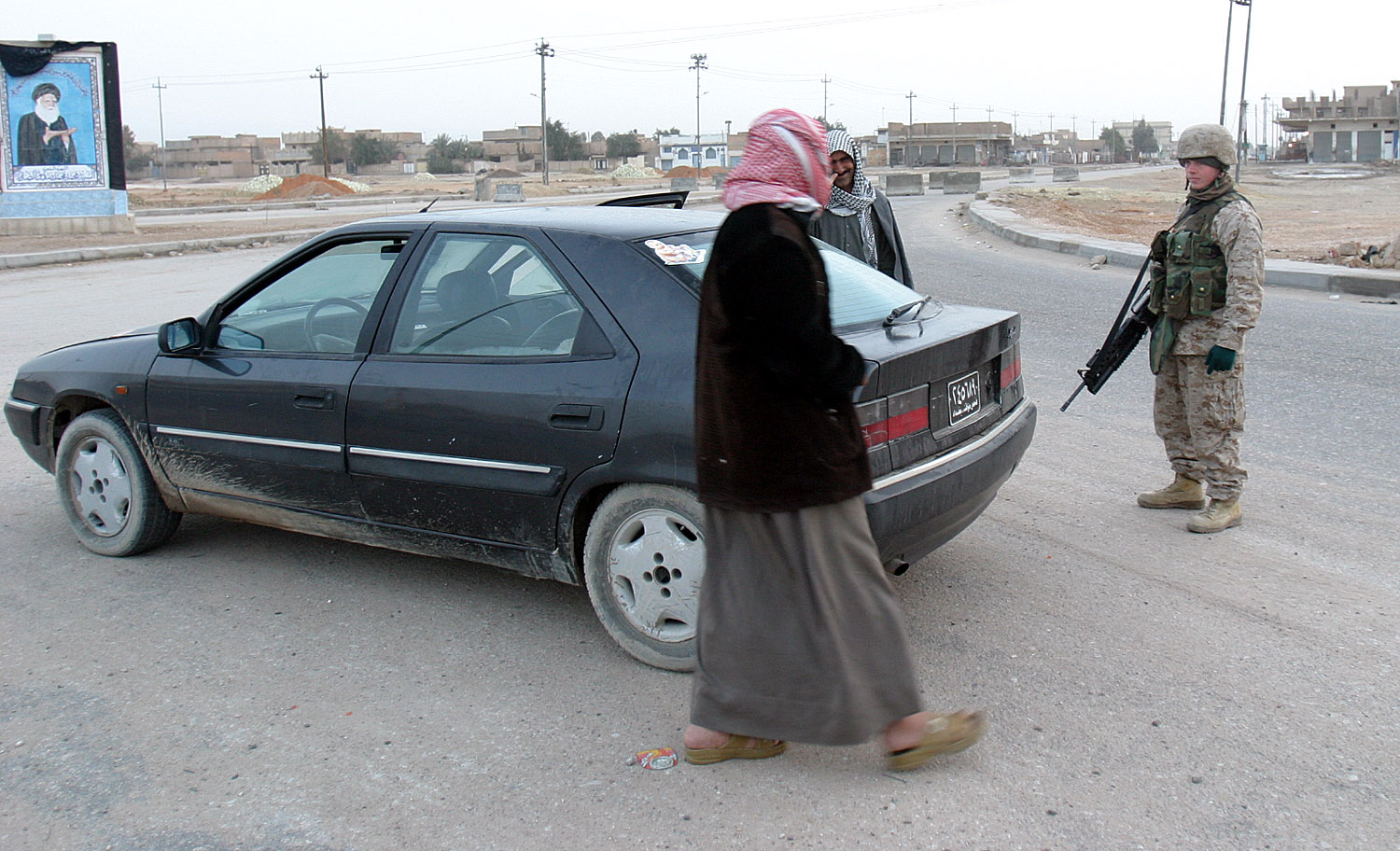
A U.S. Marine inspects a vehicle in Najaf, Iraq, on the eve of the 2005 parliamentary elections, January 29, 2005

On 24 February 2003, the 11th MEU Command Element deployed to Kuwait in support of Operation Enduring Freedom and later Operation Iraqi Freedom. On 5 March 2003, the Commanding General, I Marine Expeditionary Force (I MEF), designated the 11th MEU as Task Force Yankee (TFY), named in memory of the victims of the 11 September terrorist attacks. The following units were soon attached to the new task force: 2nd Battalion, 6th Marines; Sensitive Site Team No. 3, 75th Exploitation Task Force, U.S. Army; and Company C, 478th Engineer Battalion, U.S. Army.

TFY's responsibilities were varied and challenging. They included: planning and operation of the MEF Enemy Prisoner of War (EPW) temporary holding facility; force protection for Camp Commando, MEF Main in Iraq, ships transiting uncertain waters in the region, and MEF's primary ammunition supply point; initial investigations of suspected Weapons of Mass Destruction (WMD) sites; coordination of security plans for designated air bases, logistic support areas and lines of communication in Iraq; and Phase IV planning. The 11th MEU returned to the United States on 20 May 2003.

==== Battle of Najaf ====
On 31 July 2004, the 11th Marine Expeditionary Unit, under the Polish-led Multinational Division Central-South (MND-CS), assumed operational control of the Iraqi provinces of An Najaf and Al Qadisiyah from Task Force Dragon, composed of elements of the 1st Infantry Division. In August 2004, the MEU, led an assault consisting of 1st Battalion, 4th Marines; 1st Battalion, 5th Cavalry Regiment, 1st Cavalry Division; and 2nd Battalion, 7th Cavalry Regiment, 1st Cavalry Division, against the Islamist Mahdi Army of Muqtada al-Sadr in Najaf. The battle ended with a negotiated ceasefire later that month. The MEU remained in Najaf until February 2005 overseeing reconstruction and solatia payments.

=== Other 2000s to 2020s ===
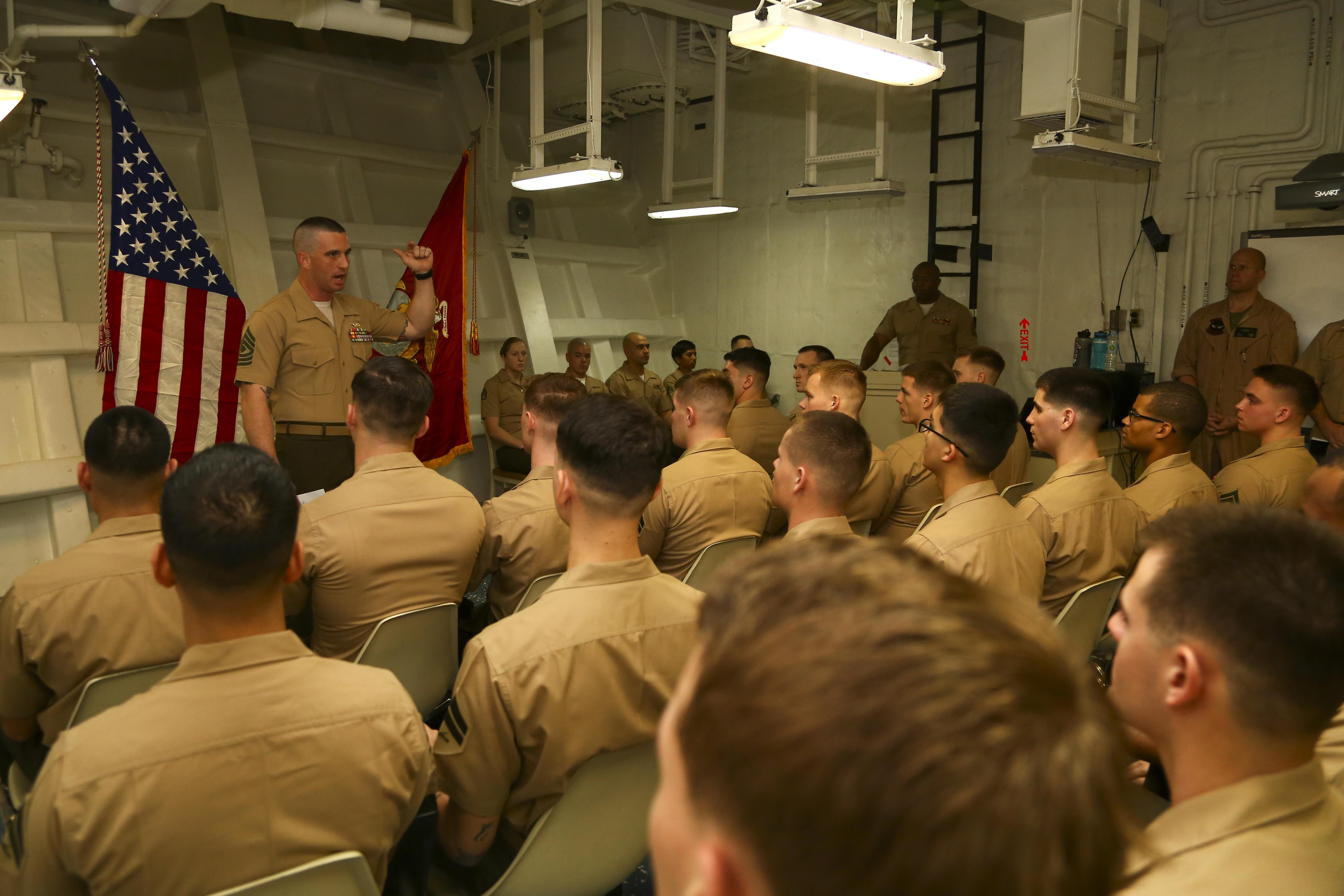
First Sergeant of Fox Company, BLT 2/1, 11th MEU, addressing graduating Marines aboard the USS Makin Island (LHD-8), October 2014

From November 2007 until 2 June 2008 the 11th MEU was deployed throughout the western Pacific and Persian Gulf. During this float they took part in exercises in the Horn of Africa and Kuwait.

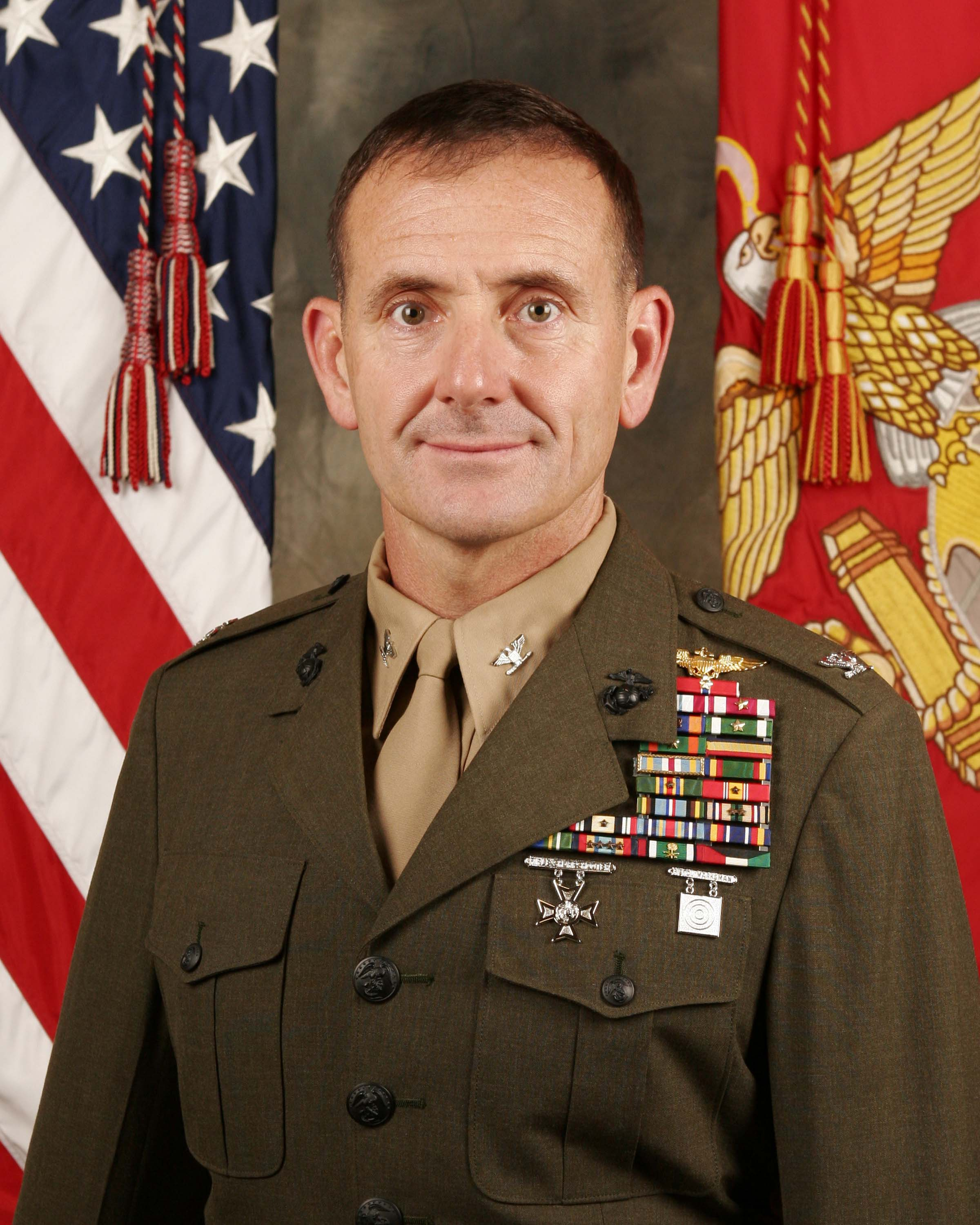
Col. Michael R. Hudson, commanding officer 11th MEU from 2010 to 2012

In March 2017, the 11th MEU deployed to Syria as part of Operation Inherent Resolve, where they set up a firebase to provide support, particularly artillery support, to US-backed forces in the upcoming assault to liberate Raqqa from ISIS occupation.

=== 2026 Iran war ===
On 19 March 2026, it was reported that the 11th MEU had embarked on the USS Boxer-led Amphibious Ready Group (ARG) which was being put on an advanced deployment from San Diego to support Operation Epic Fury in the Middle East. The ARG included USS Portland and USS Comstock. The ARG would join the Tripoli Amphibious Ready Group that is already underway with the 31st MEU. There are around 2,500 Marine Corps personnel of the total of 4,000 service members in the fleet. The sailors and Marines have shortened their leave following certification and training in order to accelerate their deployment.

== At home ==
Elements of the 11th MEU were deployed and actively participated and assisted with the Hurricane Katrina relief effort shortly after the storm. The 11th MEU was temporarily based in Mississippi and the John C. Stennis Space Center.

== 11th MEU Commanding Officers ==
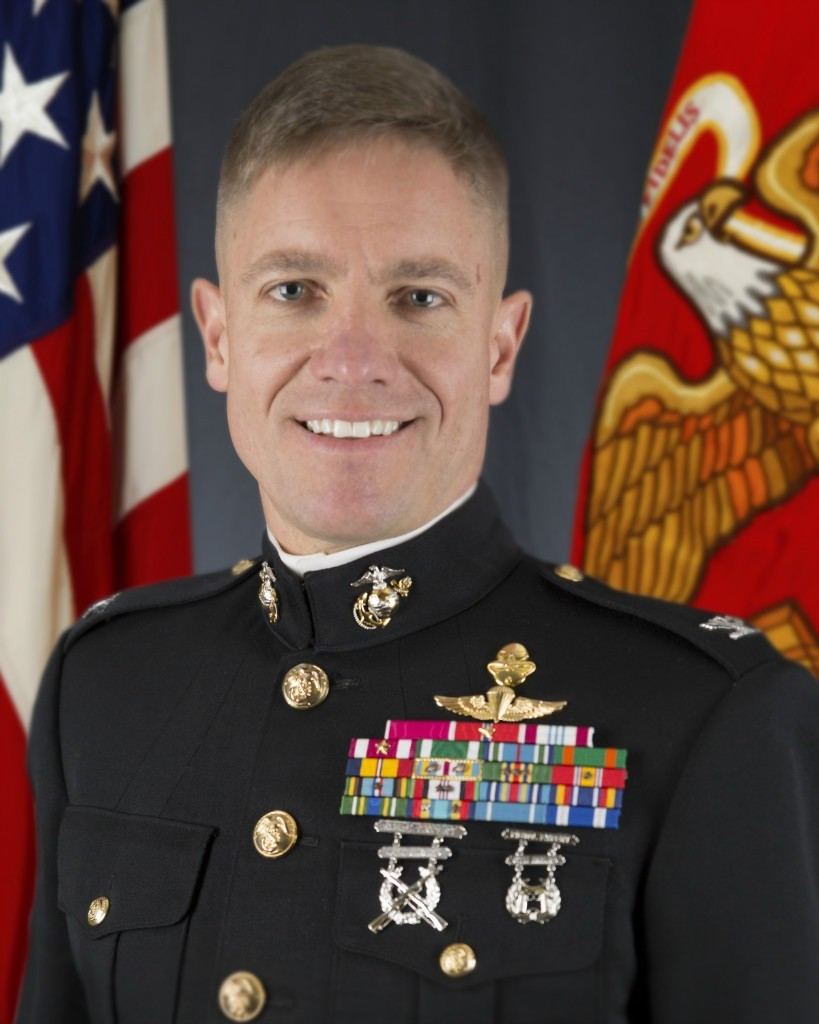
Col. Matthew G. Trollinger, commanding officer 11th MEU from 2013 to 2015

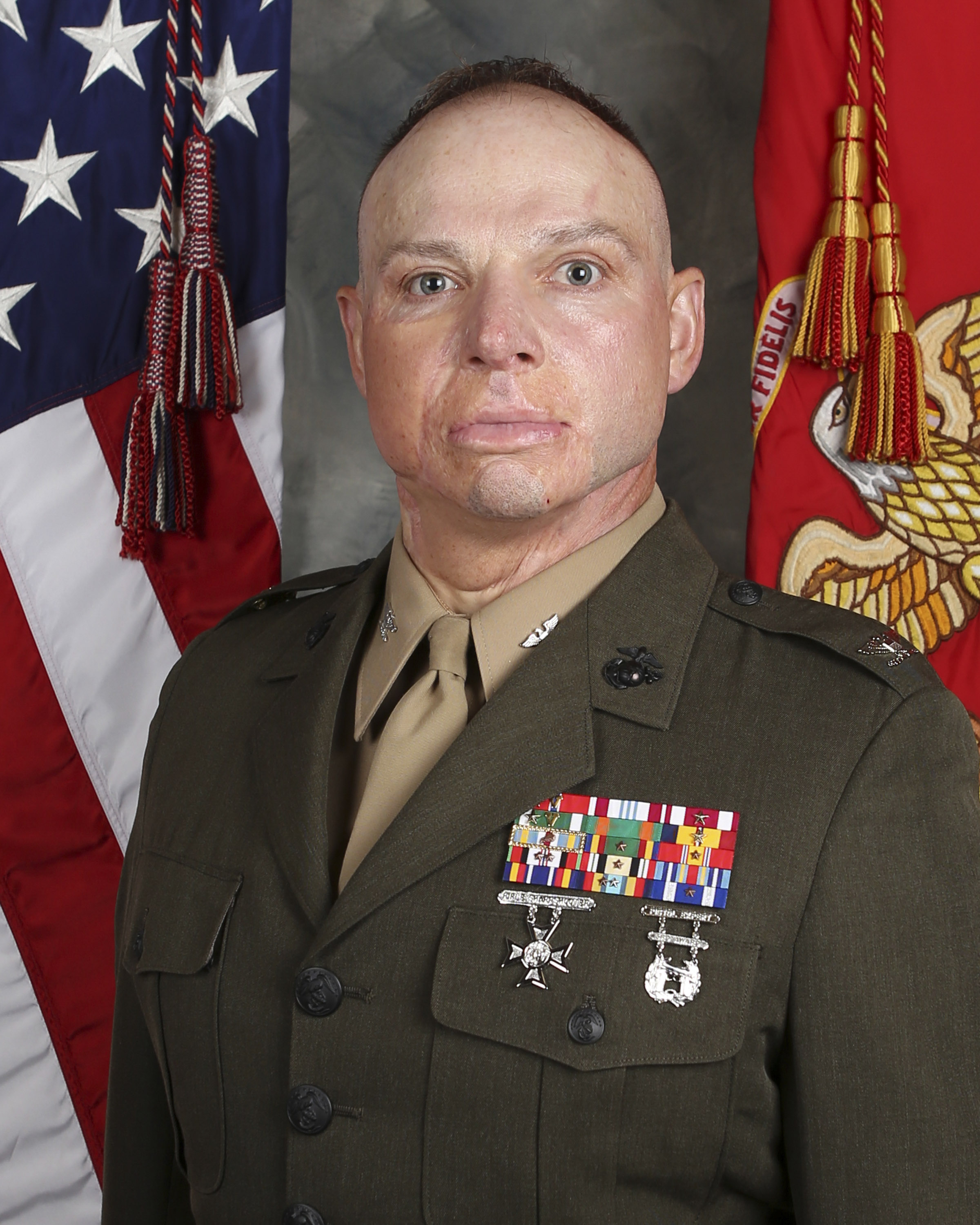
Col. Clay C. Tipton, commanding officer 11th MEU from 2015 to 2017

Col. R. L. Phillips April 15, 1984-Sept. 4, 1984	Col. R. F. Findlay Jr. Sept. 4, 1984-Aug. 7, 1986
Col. Charles E. Wilhelm Aug. 7, 1986-Aug 16, 1988	Col. Frank Libutti Aug. 16, 1988-July 2, 1990
Col. R. J. Garner July 2, 1990-Jan. 28, 1992	Col. Michael Hagee Jan. 28, 1992-March 29, 1993
Col. W. C. McMullen III March 29, 1993-Sept. 9, 1994	Col. R. B. Blose Jr. Sept. 10, 1994-May 9, 1997
Col. T. L. Moore Jr. May 9, 1997-Jan. 13, 2000	Col. C. S. Patton Jan 14, 2000-March 6, 2002
Col. A. M. Haslam March 7, 2002 – May 10, 2005	Col. John W. Bullard Jr. May 11, 2005 – June 26, 2008
Col. Gregg P. Olson June 26, 2008 – May 1, 2010	Col. M. R. Hudson May 11, 2010 – July 12, 2012
Lt. Col. M. P. Wylie July 12, 2012-Sept 3, 2012	Maj. M. N. Estes Sept 4,2012-Mar 28, 2013
Col. Matthew G. Trollinger March 28, 2013 – July 17, 2015	Col. Clay C. Tipton July 8, 2015 – October 27, 2017
Col. Fridrik Fridriksson October 2017 – July 2020	Col. James W. Lively July – July 2022
Col. Thomas M. Siverts July 2022 – June 11, 2024	Col. Caleb Hyatt June 11, 2024 – Present

== Unit awards ==
- Joint Meritorious Unit Award
- Meritorious Unit Commendation
- Marine Corps Expeditionary Medal
- Coast Guard Meritorious Unit Commendation
- National Defense Service Medal
- Armed Forces Expeditionary Medal with two Bronze Stars
- Southwest Asia Service Medal w/ 3 stars.

== See also ==
- Marine Air-Ground Task Force
- List of Marine Expeditionary Units
- Organization of the United States Marine Corps
