= 1st Combat Readiness Regiment =

- Country: United States
- Branch: USMC
- Part of: 1st Marine Logistics Group
- Garrison/HQ: Marine Corps Base Camp Pendleton
- Engagements: Operation Iraqi Freedom * 2003 invasion of Iraq; Operation Enduring Freedom

Commanders
- Current commander: Col Ghyno Kellman

The 1st Combat Readiness Regiment is a regiment of the United States Marine Corps that specializes in warehousing military goods and equipment. It is based out of Marine Corps Base Camp Pendleton, California and falls under the command of the 1st Marine Logistics Group.

== Subordinate units ==
- Headquarters Company
- 1st Maintenance Battalion
- Ammunition Company
- Supply Company
- Medical Logistics Company

== Mission ==
The mission of 1st Combat Readiness Regiment is to provide general support, ground supply support, less bulk fuel, and Navy funded stock/programs and distribution system management for the sustainment of Marine Air-Ground Task Force (MAGTF) operations.

== See also ==
- History of the United States Marine Corps
- List of United States Marine Corps battalions
