= 1st Marine Logistics Group =

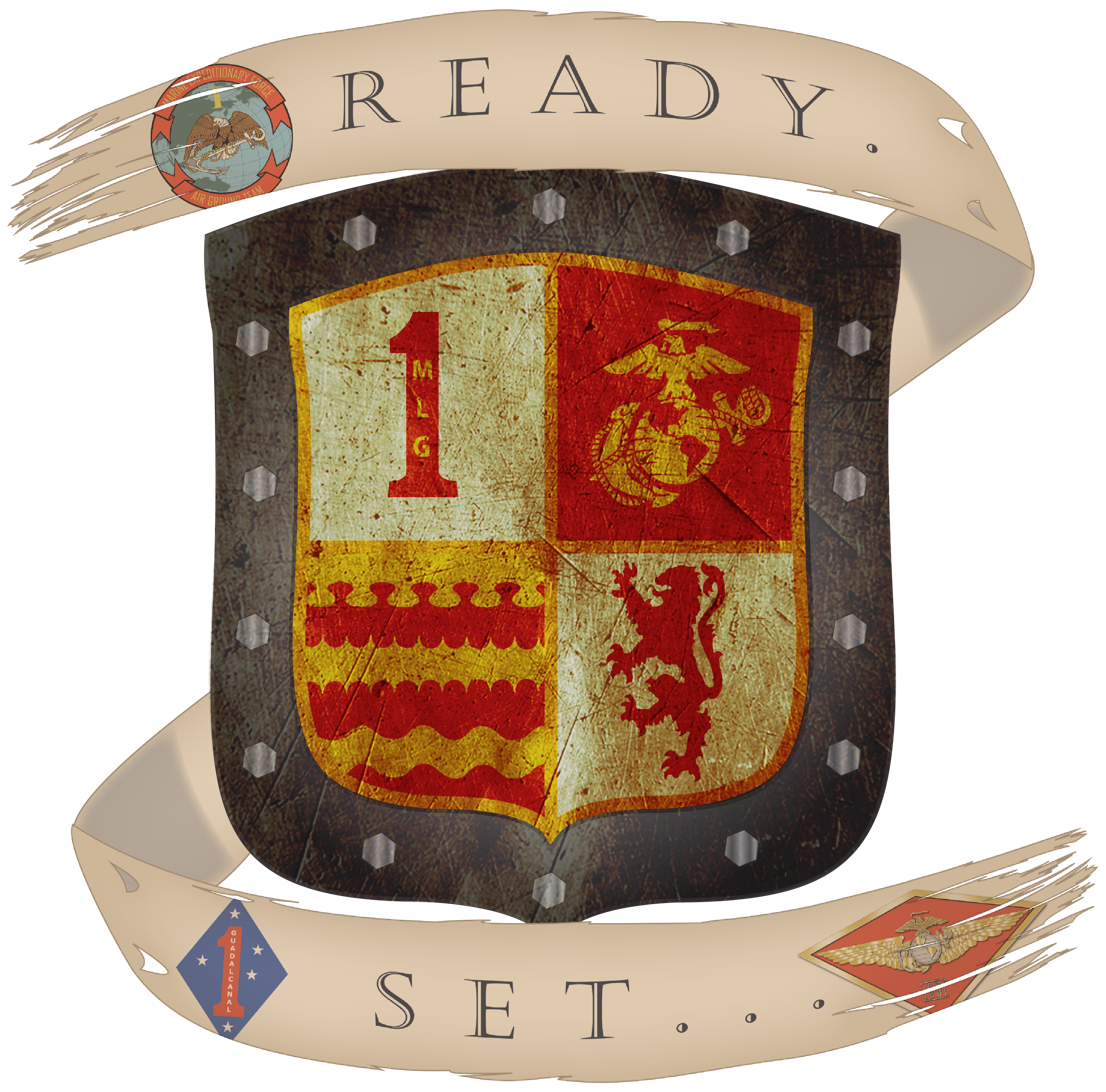
- 1st MLG Campaign Insignia (not to be confused with the official logo which can be found here "1st MLG".)
- Active: 1 July 1947 – present
- Country: United States
- Branch: United States Marine Corps
- Type: Logistics combat element
- Role: Multi-faceted combat service support
- Size: approximately 8,500
- Part of: I Marine Expeditionary Force
- Garrison/HQ: Marine Corps Base Camp Pendleton
- Nickname: Pioneer
- Mottos: Victory Through Logistics; Ready. Set...
- Engagements: Korean War; Battle of Inchon; Battle of Chosin Reservoir; Vietnam War; Operation Desert Shield; Operation Desert Storm; Operation Restore Hope; Operation Enduring Freedom; Operation Iraqi Freedom; Operation Vigilant Resolve; Operation Phantom Fury; Operation Inherent Resolve

Commanders
- Current commander: BGen Omar J Randall as of 18 June 2025.
- Notable commanders: MajGen Andrew M. Niebel; BGen Russell N. Jordahl; MajGen Ted Hopgood; MajGen Bradley M. Lott; MajGen Roberta L. Shea; LtGen John J. Broadmeadow; LtGen Stephen Sklenka; LtGen David Ottignon; LtGen James A. Brabham, Jr. LtGen Richard S. Kramlich; LtGen Richard L. Kelly; LtGen Gary S. McKissock

The 1st Marine Logistics Group (1st MLG) is a logistics unit of the United States Marine Corps and is headquartered at Marine Corps Base Camp Pendleton, California, with several subordinate elements located at Marine Corps Air Station Yuma and Marine Corps Air Ground Combat Center Twentynine Palms. It is the logistics combat element of the I Marine Expeditionary Force (I MEF).

== Mission ==
To provide tactical logistics support beyond the organic capabilities of supported elements of the Marine Expeditionary Force (MEF) and to provide task organized logistics combat elements in support of Marine Air Ground Task Force (MAGTF) operations.

== Organization ==
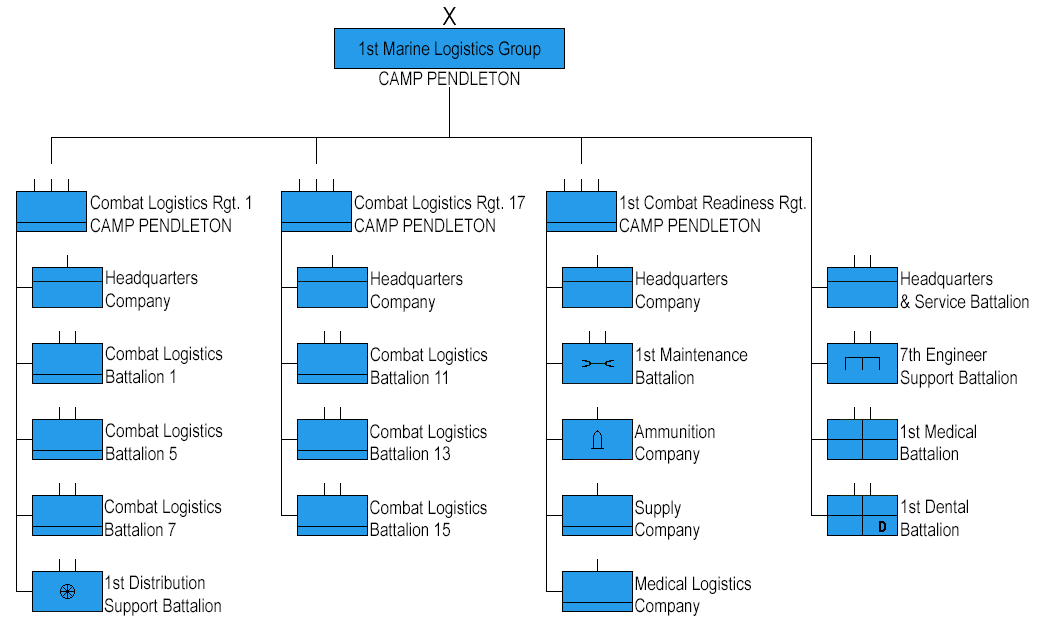
1st Marine Logistics Group organization as of May 2026 (click to enlarge)

As of May 2026, the Group consists of a headquarters and service battalion, three regiments, and four separate battalions.

- 1st Marine Logistics Group
  - Headquarters and Service Battalion
  - Combat Logistics Regiment 1
  - Combat Logistics Regiment 17
  - 1st Combat Readiness Regiment (Formed on 23 August 2024 by reorganizing the 1st Supply Battalion)
  - 1st Medical Battalion
  - 1st Dental Battalion
  - 7th Engineer Support Battalion

== History ==
The current 1st MLG was activated at Camp Pendleton, California at 1100 (PST) on 21 October 2005 in accordance with direction from MCBUL 5400 "Redesignation of Force Service Support Groups to Marine Logistics Groups" dated 2 September 2005. The lineage of 1st MLG dates back to 1 July 1947 when it was activated as the 1st Combat Service Group (1st CSG), Service Command, Fleet Marine Force at Pearl Harbor, Hawaii. In the same month, 1st CSG was relocated to Marine Corps Base Camp Pendleton, California.

=== Korean War ===
In August 1950, 1st CSG was deployed to Kobe, Japan; and was subsequently deployed in September 1950 to Inchon, Korea, assigned to the 1st Marine Division. They participated in the Korean War, fighting at Inchon-Seoul, Chosin Reservoir, the East-Central front, and the Western front. In August 1951, they were reassigned to the Fleet Marine Force; and in October 1951, reassigned to reinforce the 1st Marine Division.

By April 1952, the 1st CSG, commanded by Colonel Russell N. Jordahl, had nearly 1,400 Marines and Navy medical personnel stationed at various points between Japan and Korea. At Kobe, Japan, the Support Company of 1st CSG processed Marine drafts arriving and departing Korea. At Masan, the Supply Company of 1st CSG requisitioned for the division those Class II and IV items peculiar to the Marine Corps needs and forwarded them upon request. Heavy maintenance of all technical equipment was performed by the Maintenance Company of 1st CSG. Supporting the 1st Motor Transport Battalion operations was the Motor Transport Company of 1st CSG. Most of the CSG, including Headquarters Company, was based at Masan. Splinter detachments from the Group also operated transport facilities at other locations in Korea.

In May 1953, they were again reassigned to Fleet Marine Force and relocated to MCB Camp Pendleton, California.

On 1 March 1957, 1st CSG was redesignated as the 1st Force Service Regiment (1st FSR).

=== Vietnam War ===
In May 1965 detachments of 1st FSR were sent to Okinawa and Vietnam. In August 1965 Headquarters and Service Battalion, 1st FSR was deployed to Vietnam.

In February 1967, the 1st FSR was deployed to the Republic of Vietnam. On 15 February 1967, they were redesignated/assigned as the 1st Force Service Regiment, Force Logistic Command, Fleet Marine Force and assigned to the III Marine Amphibious Force.

They participated in the Vietnam War from February 1967 to April 1971, operating from Da Nang, South Vietnam.

=== 1970s ===
On 23 April 1971, 1st FSR was relocated to Camp Pendleton, California. Then on 30 March 1976, they were redesignated as 1st Force Service Support Group (1st FSSG).

=== 1980s ===
During September 1986, a milestone was reached in the long-term effort to improve the organization of the Corps' FSSGs, with phase I of the reorganization underway. Earlier that year, the decision was made to pursue the general reorganization concept contained in the Center for Naval Analyses, Combat Service Support Structure Study of 1985 to restructure the FSSG's functional battalions in a way that would facilitate deployment of Marine amphibious brigades and simplify task organizing for other MAGTF commitments. A trial for the revised structures was scheduled to begin during early 1987.

=== 1990s ===
1st FSSG participated in Operation Desert Shield and Operation Desert Storm from September 1990 to April 1991. Brigadier General James A. Brabham Jr., a native Pennsylvanian who served twice in Vietnam and as the Deputy J-4 for logistics at USCENTCOM, commanded I MEF's combat service support element – the 1st FSSG. General Brabham reorganized 1st FSSG into a direct support group, a general support group, and a headquarters and services group. General Brabham assigned Colonel Alexander Powell, the former commander of BSSG-7, as the commander of Direct Support Group (DSG) 1 and gave him the responsibility of sustaining the 1st Marine Division and the 3d Marine Aircraft Wing. Expecting to be the 1st FSSG's operations officer upon arrival, Colonel Thomas E. Hampton, a former infantry officer and Vietnam war veteran from southern Illinois, was instead ordered by General Brabham to take charge of General Support Group (GSG). The mission of the GSG organization was to provide general support to the MEF. To command the Headquarters and Support Group (H&SG), General Brabham tapped Lieutenant Colonel Henry T. Hayden and ordered him to provide internal support to the 1st FSSG, a variety of services to I MEF, and to coordinate port security.

Following Operation Desert Storm, the 1st FSSG, under the command of BGen Ted Hopgood (a career infantryman), participated in Operation Restore Hope in Somalia from December 1992 to February 1993.

=== Iraq and Afghanistan ===
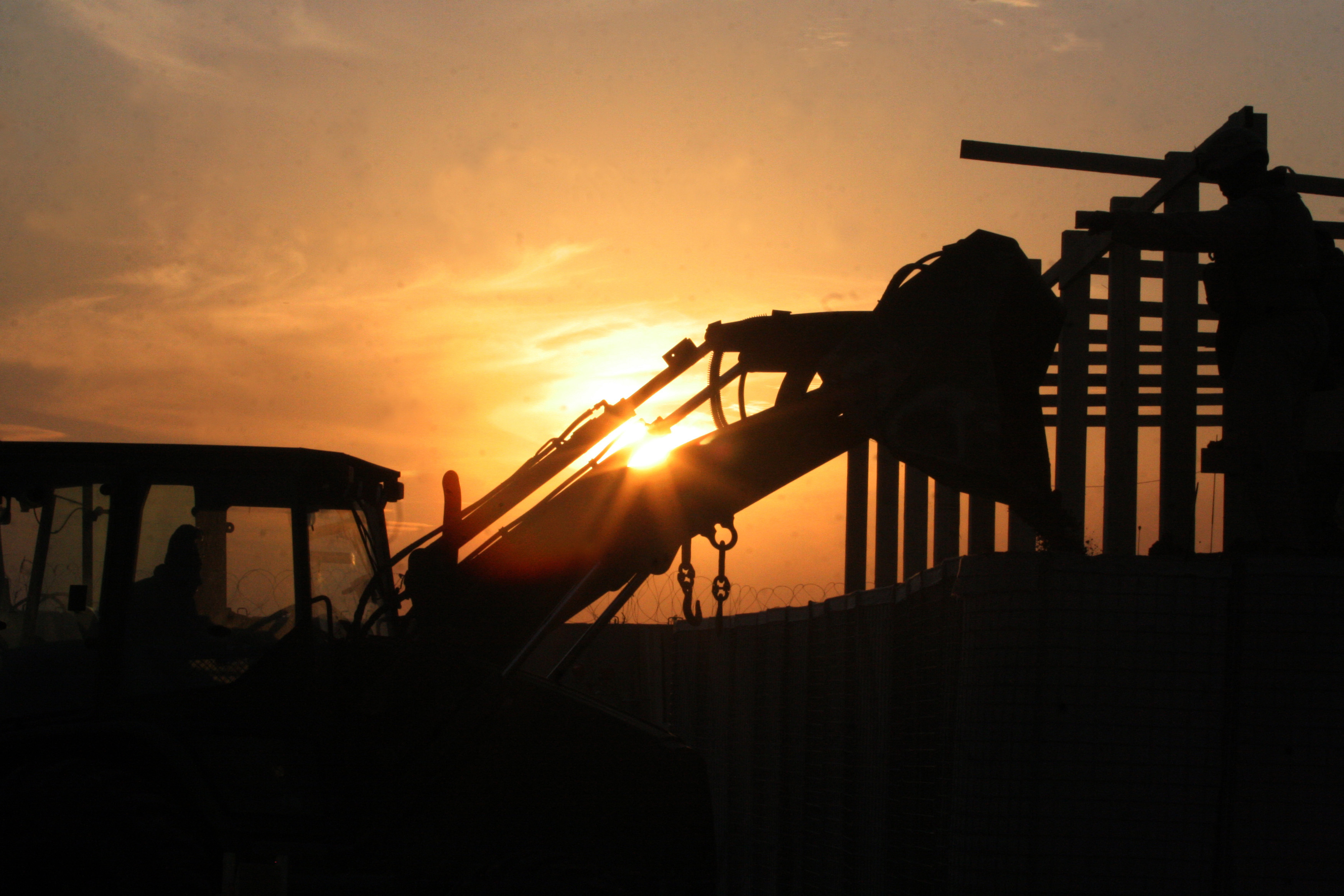
A U.S. Marine with Operations Platoon, Engineer Company, Combat Logistics Battalion 5, 1st Marine Logistics Group (Forward) directs a backhoe – building barriers to guard a checkpoint near Fallujah, Iraq. (December 2006, USMC photo)

The Marines and Sailors of 1st MLG were deployed to Iraq in support of Operation Iraqi Freedom on four occasions.

First deployment

The 1st FSSG deployed to Kuwait in late 2002 as part of the I Marine Expeditionary Force (I MEF) buildup ahead of the invasion. In March 2003, 1st FSSG elements crossed into Iraq. After approximately one month and the fall of Bagdad, the war ("Major Combat Operations") was declared over. The Marines and Sailors of 1st FSSG, along with I MEF, redeployed back to the United States over the rest of the summer 2003.

Second deployment

In January 2004, the group deployed to Iraq for a second time – for 14 months to various camps in Iraq to include Camp Taqaddum (Headquarters), Camp Fallujah, Al Asad Air Base, Camp Habbiniyah, and, after the Abu Ghraib scandal, they took over guarding the prison as well. The 1st FSSG was involved with Operation Al Fajr (The Second Battle of Fallujah), the operation to retake the city of Fallujah. The artillery that helped bombard the city were stationed in the 1st FSSG HQ area. They returned to Camp Pendleton in early 2006.

On 21 October 2005, the 1st FSSG was redesignated as 1st Marine Logistics Group (1st MLG). The lower subordinate units were reorganized and some renamed.

Third deployment

In February 2007, the 1st MLG returned from their third deployment, having served in several locations, including Camp Fallujah, Camp Taqaddum and Al Asad Air Base. The deployment was part of two seven-month assignments, but many Marines stayed for the greater duration of 14 months.

Fourth deployment

In February 2008, under the command of BGen Robert R. Ruark, executed a relief in place with the 2nd Marine Logistics Group (Forward) at Camp Taqaddum, operating in Al Anbar Province.

Post-OIF period

From March 2010 to March 2011 and from February 2012 to September 2012, 1st MLG participated in Operation Enduring Freedom in Afghanistan. Elements of 1st MLG once again participated in Operation Enduring Freedom in Afghanistan from January 2014 to December 2014.

Elements of 1st MLG also participated in Operation Inherent Resolve in Iraq and Syria from August 2014 through into 2019.

== Unit awards ==
A unit citation or commendation is an award bestowed upon an organization for the action cited. Members of the unit who participated in said actions are allowed to wear on their uniforms the awarded unit citation. The 1st Marine Logistics Group has been presented with the following awards:

| Streamer | Award | Year(s) | Additional Info |
|---|---|---|---|
| | Presidential Unit Citation Streamer with two Bronze Stars | 1950, 1951, 2003 | Korea, Iraq |
| | Joint Meritorious Unit Award Streamer | 1992–1993 | Somalia |
| | Navy Unit Commendation Streamer with one Silver and one Bronze Star | 1952–1952, 1967–1968, 1968–1969, 1990–1991, 2004–2005, 2006–2007, 2010–2011 | Korea, Vietnam, Southwest Asia, Iraq, Afghanistan |
| | National Defense Service Streamer with three Bronze Stars | | |
| | Korean Service Streamer with two Silver Stars | | |
| | Armed Forces Expeditionary Streamer | | |
| | Vietnam Service Streamer with two Silver and one Bronze Stars | | |
| | Southwest Asia Service Streamer with two Bronze Stars | | |
| A multicolored streamer with (from outer to inner) green, red, black (the three colors of the Afghan flag), white, red, and white again horizontal stripes with a blue horizontal stripe in the center | Afghanistan Campaign Streamer with two Bronze stars | | |
| | Iraq Campaign Streamer with one Silver and two Bronze Stars | | |
| | Global War on Terrorism Expeditionary Streamer | | |
| | Global War on Terrorism Service Streamer | | |
| | Korea Presidential Unit Citation Streamer | | |
| | Vietnam Gallantry Cross with Palm Streamer | | |
| | Vietnam Meritorious Unit Citation Civil Actions Streamer | | |

== See also ==
- List of United States Marine Corps logistics groups
- Smoke the Donkey
