= Ground Combat Element =

Land component of the U.S. Marine Corps' Marine Air-Ground Task Forces

In the United States Marine Corps, the Ground Combat Element (GCE) is the land force of a Marine Air–Ground Task Force (MAGTF). It provides power projection and force for the MAGTF.

== Role within the MAGTF ==
The Ground Combat Element (GCE), composed primarily of infantry units (infantry battalions organized into battalion landing teams, regimental combat teams, and Marine divisions). These organizations contain a headquarters unit that provides command and control (management and planning for manpower, intelligence, operations and training, and logistics functions) as well as scout/sniper, aviation liaison/forward air controller, nuclear/biological/chemical defense, communications, service (supply, motor transport, weapons maintenance, and dining facility), and Navy combat medical and chaplain's corps personnel. The GCE also contains combat support units, including artillery, armor (assault amphibian, and light armored reconnaissance; the Marine Corps decommissioned their tank units in the early 2020s, as part of the service Force Design 2030 initiative which saw it move away from larger armor formations), combat engineer, and reconnaissance units. At the division level, the GCE also contains limited organic combat service support, including a truck company, a military police/law enforcement company, and the division band.

== U.S. Marine Corps Infantry ==
Marine Infantry Battalions

As the largest component of the GCE, Marine infantry is essentially multi-purpose, heavily manned and equipped, light infantry (e.g., a Marine rifle squad having 13 Marines, vs. nine soldiers in an U.S. Army rifle squad). With three rifle companies that are over 40% larger, plus a weapons company, and an additional 100 members in its Headquarters and Service Company (as compared to the TO&E of an Army light infantry battalion), the Marine infantry battalion contains approximately 970 members as compared to approximately 560 in an Army light infantry battalion.

Marine infantry battalions that are reinforced to form a Battalion Landing Team (BLT) are also very heavily supported (as compared to Army light infantry) with additional organic assets. This combat support includes: a field artillery howitzer battery containing a firing platoon of six 155mm howitzers, plus three reinforced armored vehicle platoons (including one each of amphibious assault vehicles, main battle tanks, and light armored reconnaissance vehicles), and one platoon each of infantry reconnaissance and combat engineers.

While primarily trained, organized and equipped to be foot-mobile, Marine infantry is of course, prepared to execute amphibious operations, either by Amphibious Assault Vehicle (AAV-P7-A1), Landing Craft Air Cushion (LCAC), Rigid-Hulled Inflatable Boat (RHIB/RIB), Rigid buoyant boat (RBB), or conventional landing craft such as the Landing Craft Utility (LCU 1466/1610/1627) and Landing Craft Mechanized (LCM-8), etc. In addition, all Marine infantry units are prepared, and regularly train, to perform heliborne, or "vertical envelopment" (i.e., air assault) operations when supported by MV-22 medium tiltrotor and/or CH-53 heavy helicopters and mechanized operations (when supported by attached amphibious assault vehicle units). Additionally, some Marine infantrymen (usually only those assigned to reconnaissance or special operations units) attend U.S. Army Airborne or Ranger training. However, since the USMC does not maintain either airborne or Ranger infantry units, only a relatively small number of Marines ever attend these two schools.

Furthermore, while not designated as special operations forces, deployed Marine Expeditionary Units (containing a heavily reinforced Marine infantry battalion, consisting of approximately 1,200 Marines and Navy personnel, designated as a BLT) can be certified as capable of performing some ""special operations"" type missions. In addition to significant differences between Marine infantry and their US Army counterparts in training and organization, there are some differences in individual weapons, equipment, and vehicles, as well.

The Marine Corps conducts infantry training at three locations:

- The Basic School, Marine Corps Base Quantico, VA (for officers)
- School of Infantry (East), Camp Lejeune, NC (for enlisted Marines)
- School of Infantry (West), Camp Pendleton, CA (for enlisted Marines)

Current Marine Infantry Organization

- 1st Marine Division (3 Marine infantry regiments containing 9 Marine infantry battalions)
- 2nd Marine Division (3 Marine infantry regiments containing 9 Marine infantry battalions)
- 3rd Marine Division (2 Marine infantry regiments containing 6 Marine infantry battalions)
- 4th Marine Division (2 Marine infantry regiments containing 8 Marine infantry battalions)

== Organization ==
The size of the GCE varies in proportion to the size of the MAGTF. A Marine Expeditionary Force has a division (MARDIV). A Marine Expeditionary Brigade holds an infantry regiment, reinforced with equipment and personnel from various divisional combat support regiments (i.e., artillery) and battalions (e.g., armor). The various Marine Expeditionary Units command a reinforced infantry battalion, which includes various combat support unit attachments. Generally, MEF postings are permanent, while MEBs and MEUs rotate their GCE, ACE, and LCE twice annually.

== Hierarchy of Marine ground units ==
=== 1st Marine Division ===
GCE of I Marine Expeditionary Force

Battalion Name	Insignia	Nickname
Headquarters Battalion 1st Marine Division(HQ Battalion 1st Marine Division)		Standard Bearers

==== 1st Marine Regiment ====

Battalion Name	Insignia	Nickname
1st Battalion 1st Marines(1-1st Marines)		First of the First
2nd Battalion 1st Marines(2-1st Marines)		The Professionals
3rd Battalion 1st Marines(3-1st Marines)		Thundering Third
1st Battalion 4th Marines(1-4th Marines)		The China Marines

==== 5th Marine Regiment ====
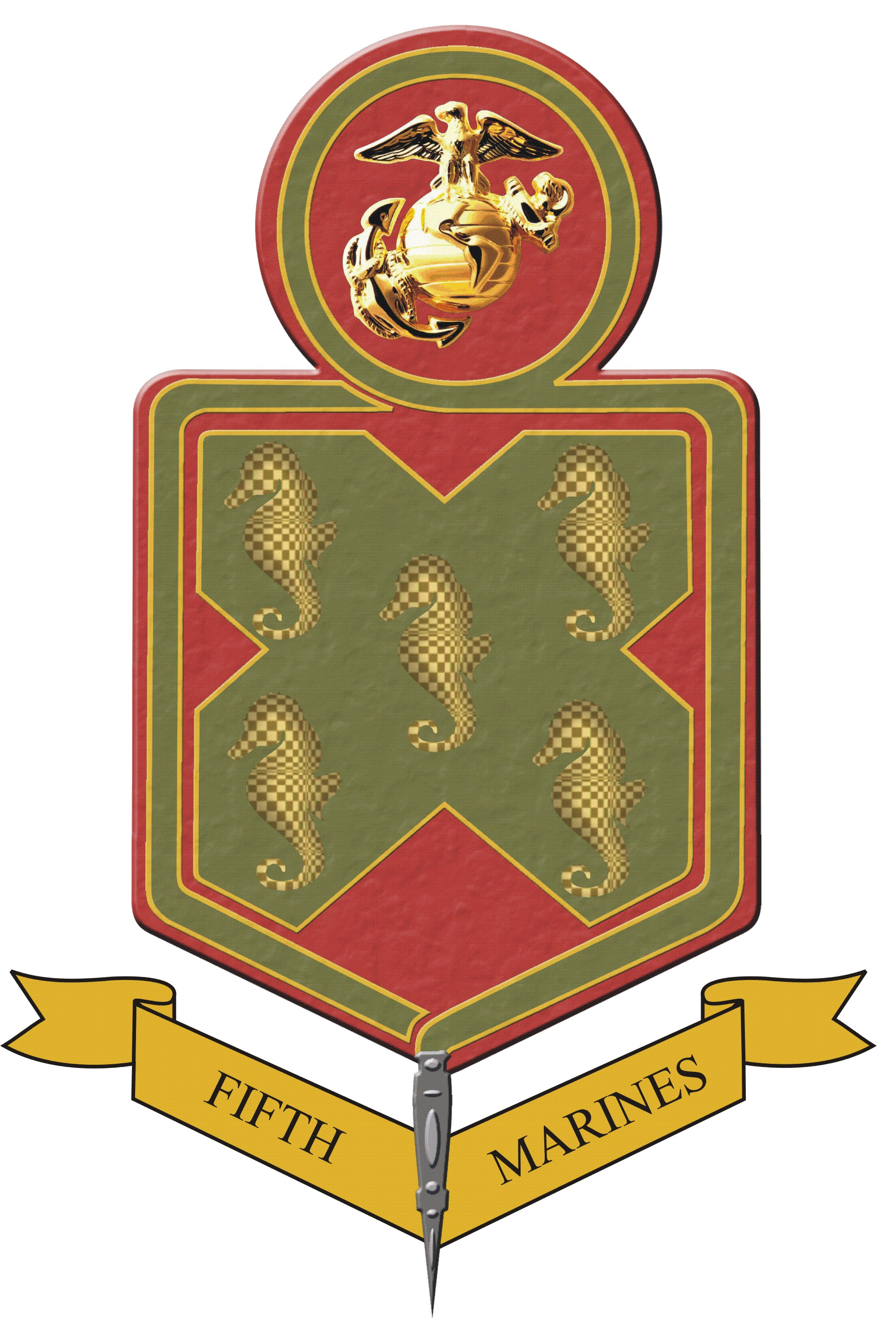

Battalion Name	Insignia	Nickname
1st Battalion 5th Marines(1-5th Marines)		Geronimo
2nd Battalion 5th Marines(2-5th Marines)		Raiders
3rd Battalion 5th Marines(3-5th Marines)		Darkhorse
2nd Battalion 4th Marines(2-4th Marines)		The Magnificent Bastards

==== 7th Marine Regiment ====
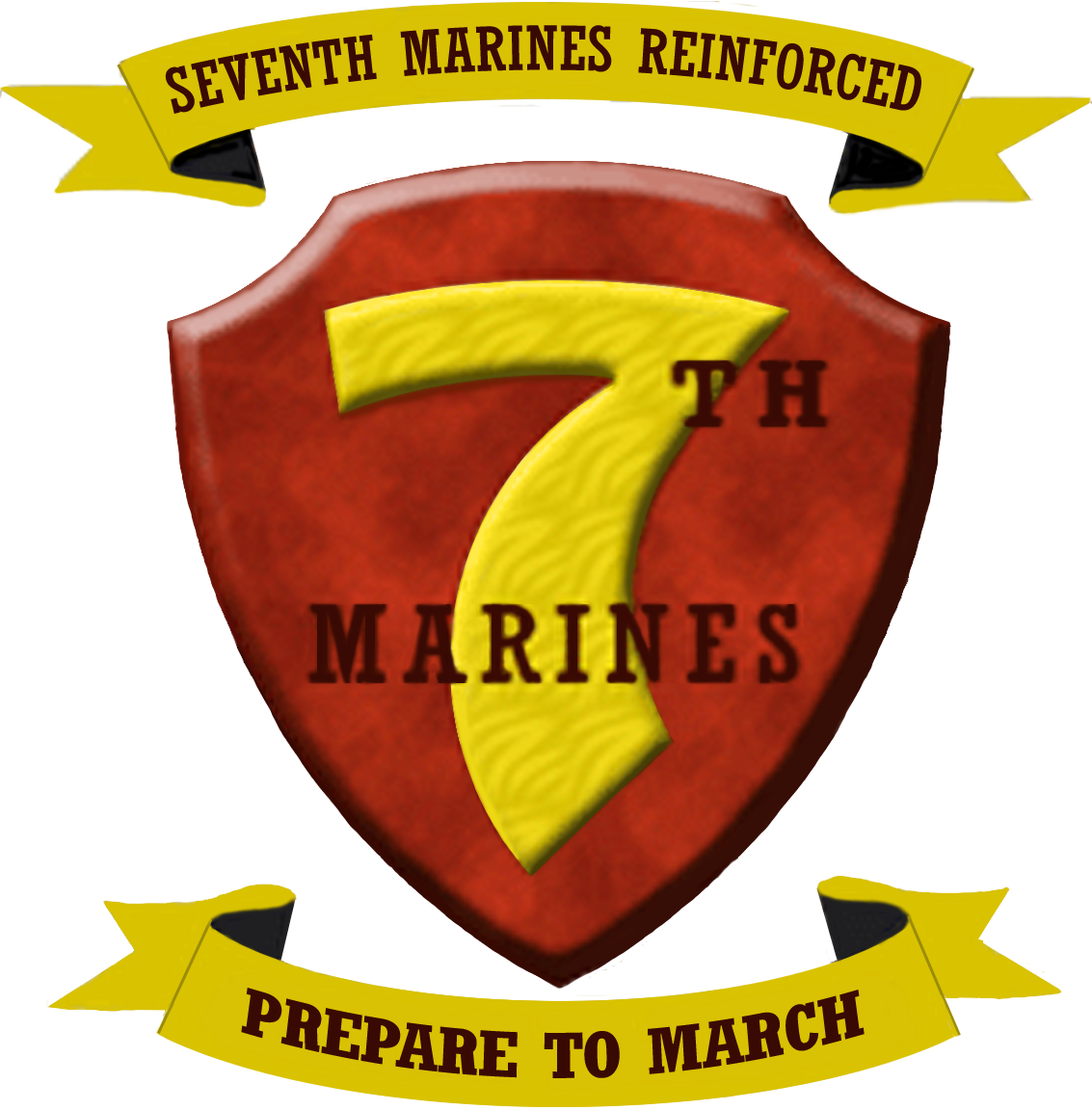

Battalion Name	Insignia	Nickname
1st Battalion 7th Marines(1-7th Marines)		First Team
2nd Battalion 7th Marines(2-7th Marines)		War Dogs
3rd Battalion 7th Marines(3-7th Marines)		The Cutting Edge
3rd Battalion 4th Marines(3-4th Marines)		Darkside

==== 11th Marine Regiment ====
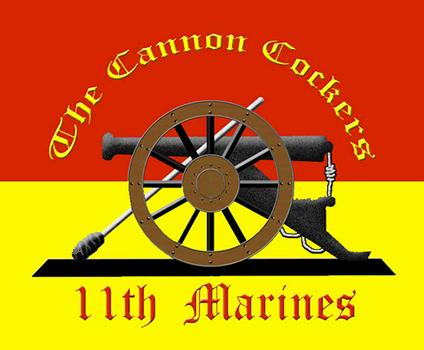

Battalion Name	Insignia	Nickname
1st Battalion 11th Marines(1-11th Marines)		The Avengers
2nd Battalion 11th Marines(2-11th Marines)		Meta-Evolutionists
3rd Battalion 11th Marines(3-11th Marines)		The XX Hatchlings L
5th Battalion 11th Marines(5-11th Marines)		Safiticy

==== Other 1st Marine Division battalions ====
Battalion Name	Insignia	Nickname
1st Light Armored Reconnaissance Battalion		Highlander
3rd Light Armored Reconnaissance Battalion		Wolfpack
1st Reconnaissance Battalion		True That
1st Combat Engineer Battalion		The Super Breed
3rd Assault Amphibian Battalion		3rd Tracks

=== 2nd Marine Division ===
GCE of II Marine Expeditionary Force

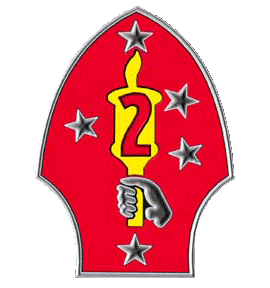

Battalion Name	Insignia	Nickname
Headquarters Battalion 2nd Marine Division(HQ Battalion 2nd Marine Division)		

==== 2nd Marine Regiment ====
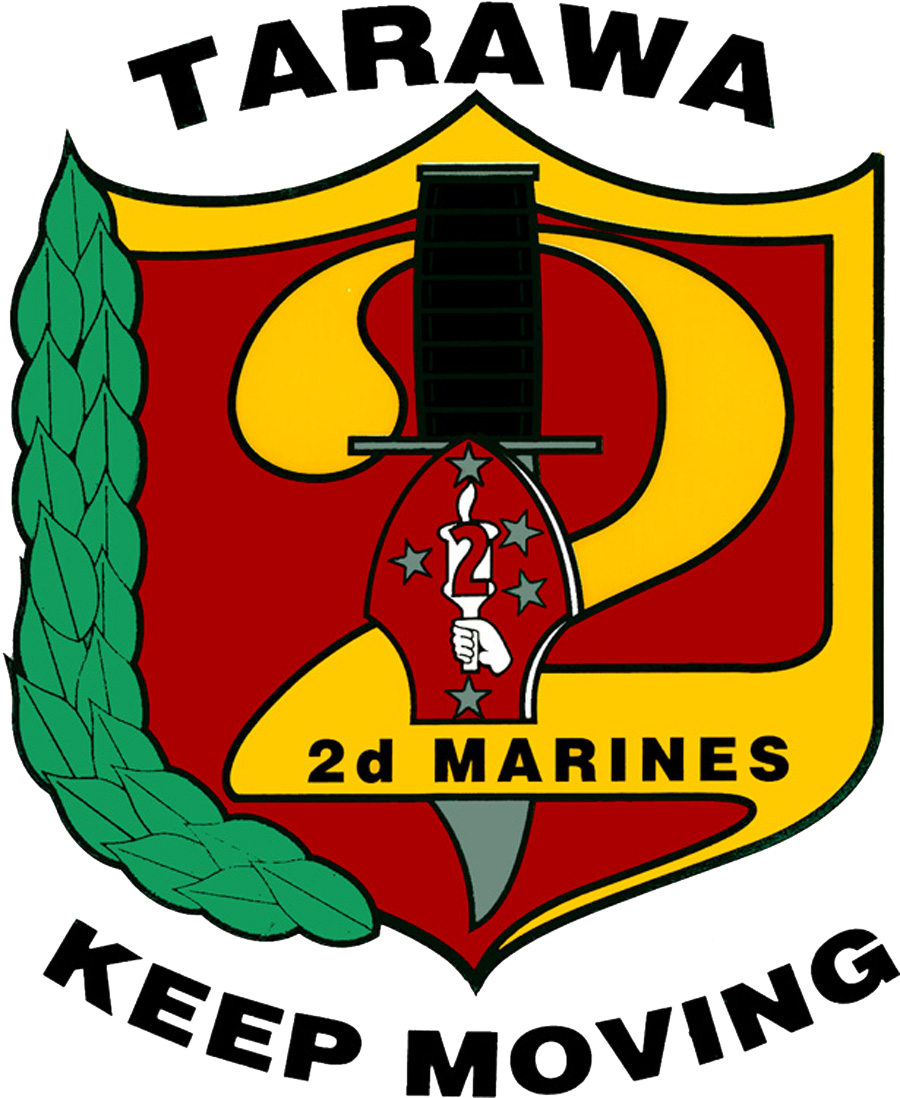

Battalion Name	Insignia	Nickname
1st Battalion 2nd Marines		Timberwolf
2nd Battalion 2nd Marines		Warlords
3rd Battalion 2nd Marines		Betio Bastards
2nd Battalion 8th Marines		America's Battalion

==== 6th Marine Regiment ====
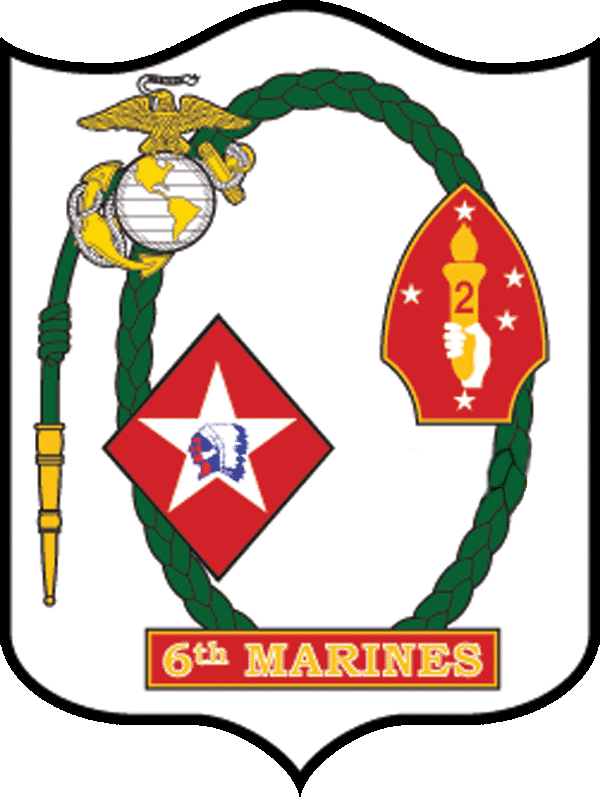

Battalion Name	Insignia	Nickname
1st Battalion 6th Marines		Hard
2nd Battalion 6th Marines		The Ready Battalion
3rd Battalion 6th Marines		Teufelhunden
1st Battalion 8th Marines		The Beirut Battalion

==== 10th Marine Regiment ====
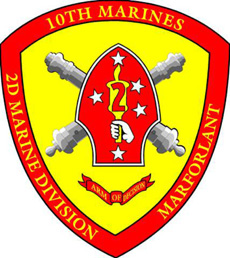

Battalion Name	Insignia	Nickname
1st Battalion 10th Marines		Nightmare
2nd Battalion 10th Marines		Pathfinder Battalion
3rd Battalion 10th Marines		Seven For One
5th Battalion 10th Marines		The Five and Dime

==== Other 2nd Marine Division battalions ====
Battalion Name	Insignia	Nickname
2nd Light Armored Reconnaissance Battalion(2nd LAR)		Destroyers
2nd Reconnaissance Battalion(2nd Recon Battalion)		
2nd Combat Engineer Battalion(2nd CEB)		
2nd Assault Amphibian Battalion(2nd AAB)		2nd Tracks

=== 3rd Marine Division ===
GCE of III Marine Expeditionary Force

Battalion Name	Insignia	Nickname
Headquarters Battalion 3rd Marine Division(HQ Battalion 3rd Marine Division)		

==== 3d Marine Littoral Regiment ====
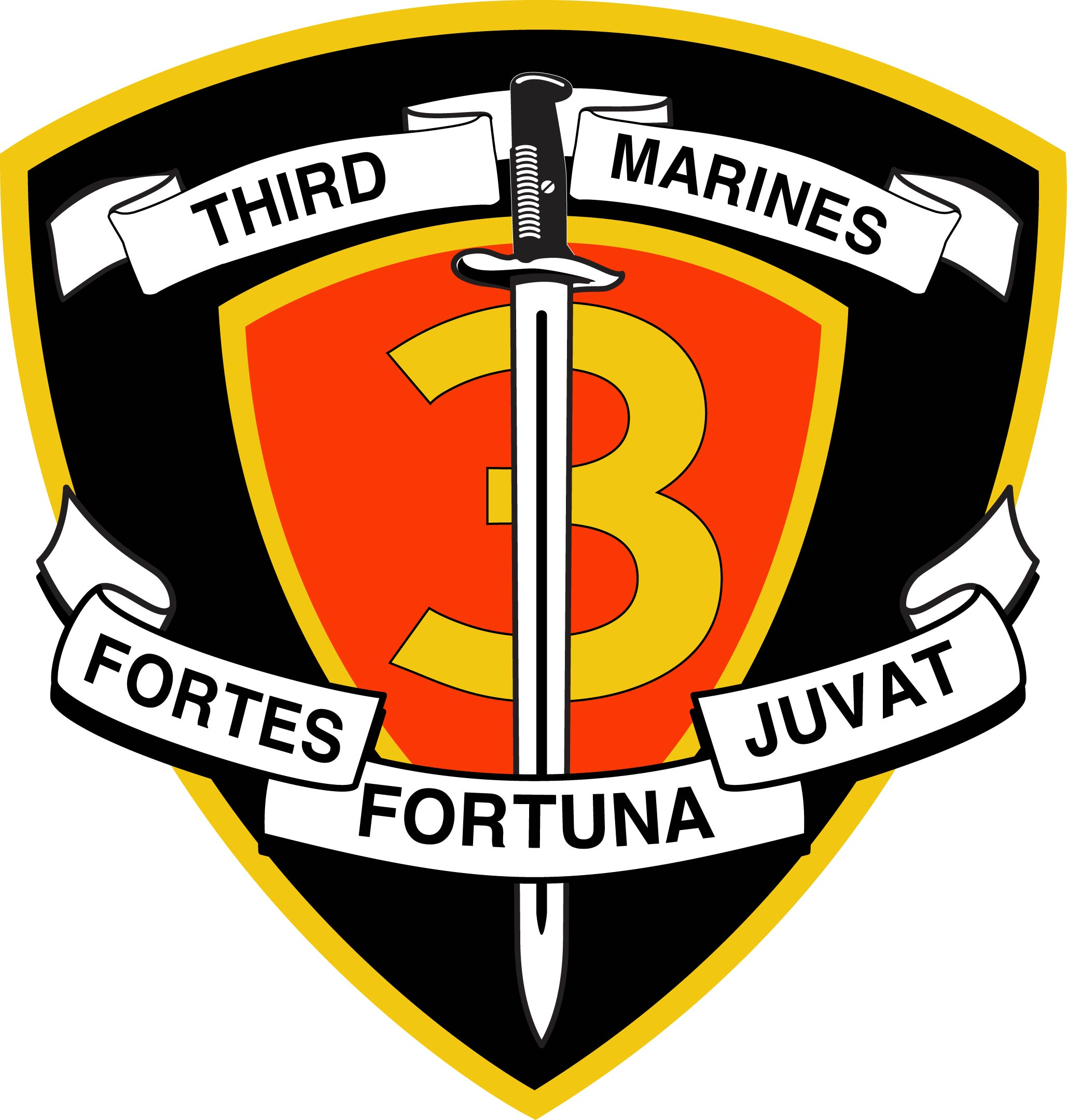

Battalion Name	Insignia	Nickname
3d Littoral Combat Team		Lava Dogs
3d Littoral Anti-Air Battalion		
3d Littoral Logistics Battalion		

==== 4th Marine Regiment ====
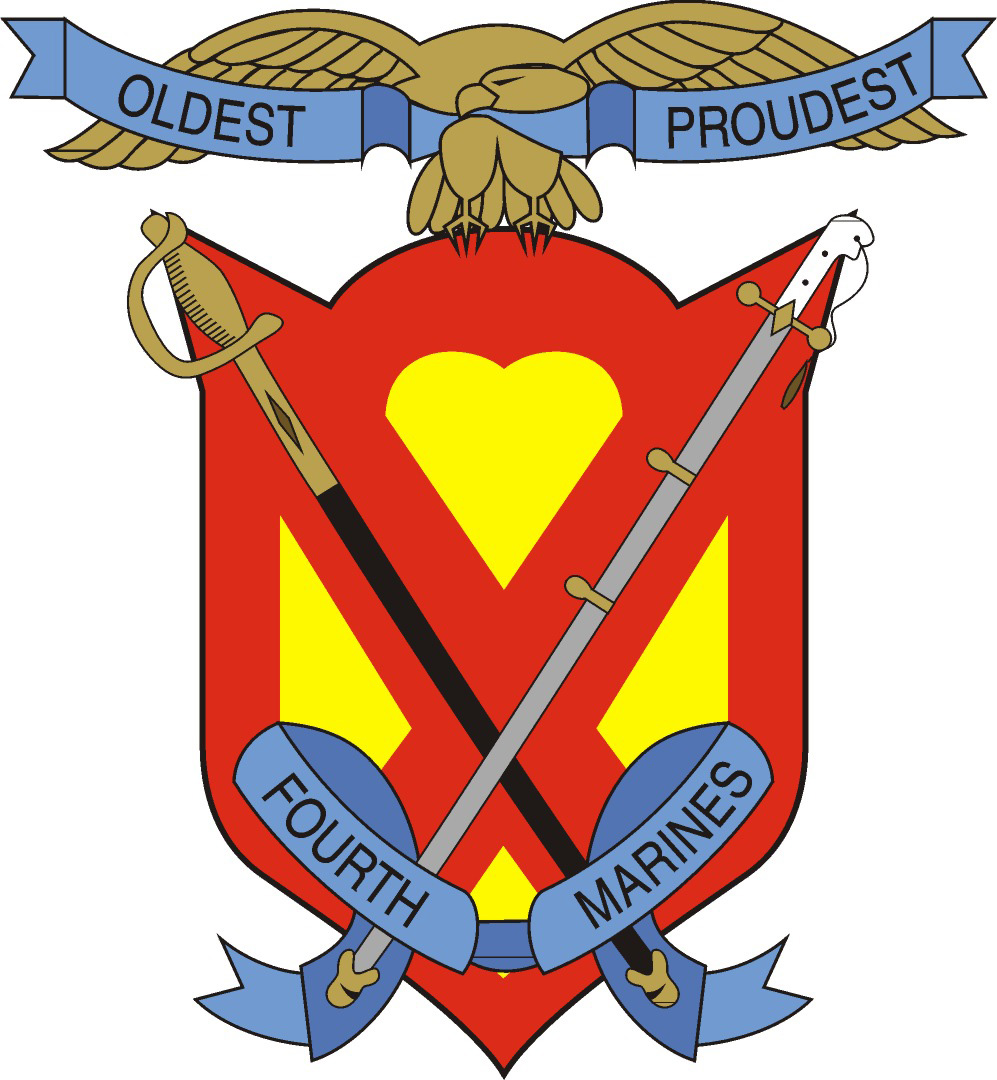

Battalion Name	Insignia	Nickname
2nd Battalion 4th Marines		The Magnificent Bastards
3rd Battalion 4th Marines		Third Herd

==== 12th Marine Littoral Regiment ====
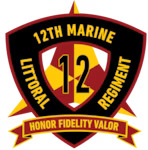

Battalion Name	Insignia	Nickname
3rd Battalion 12th Marines		Warrior of the Pacific
12th Littoral Combat Team		
12th Littoral Anti-Air Battalion		
12th Littoral Logistics Battalion		

==== Other 3rd Marine Division battalions ====
Battalion Name	Insignia	Nickname
3rd Reconnaissance Battalion(3rd Recon)		The Forward Shadow

=== 4th Marine Division ===
GCE of Marine Forces Reserve

Battalion Name	Insignia	Nickname
Headquarters Battalion 4th Marine Division(HQ Battalion 4th Marine Division)		

==== 14th Marine Regiment ====
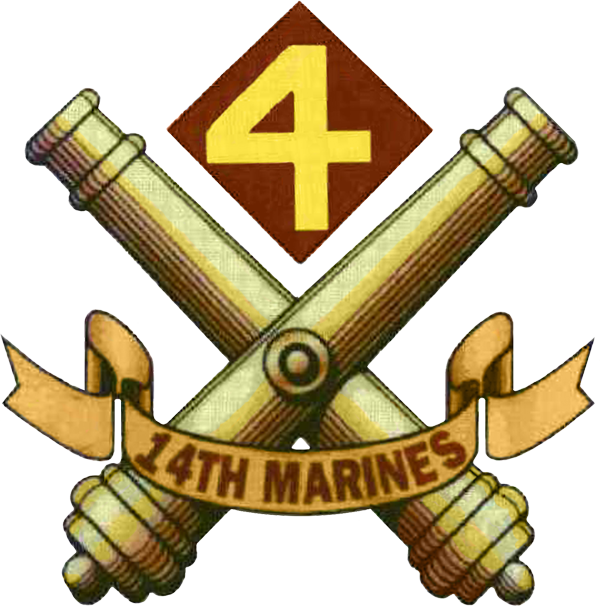

Battalion Name	Insignia	Nickname
1st Battalion 14th Marines(1-14th Marines)		At The Ready
2nd Battalion 14th Marines(2-14th Marines)		
3rd Battalion 14th Marines(3-14th Marines)		
4th Battalion 14th Marines(4-14th Marines)		
5th Battalion 14th Marines(5-14th Marines)		

==== 23rd Marine Regiment ====
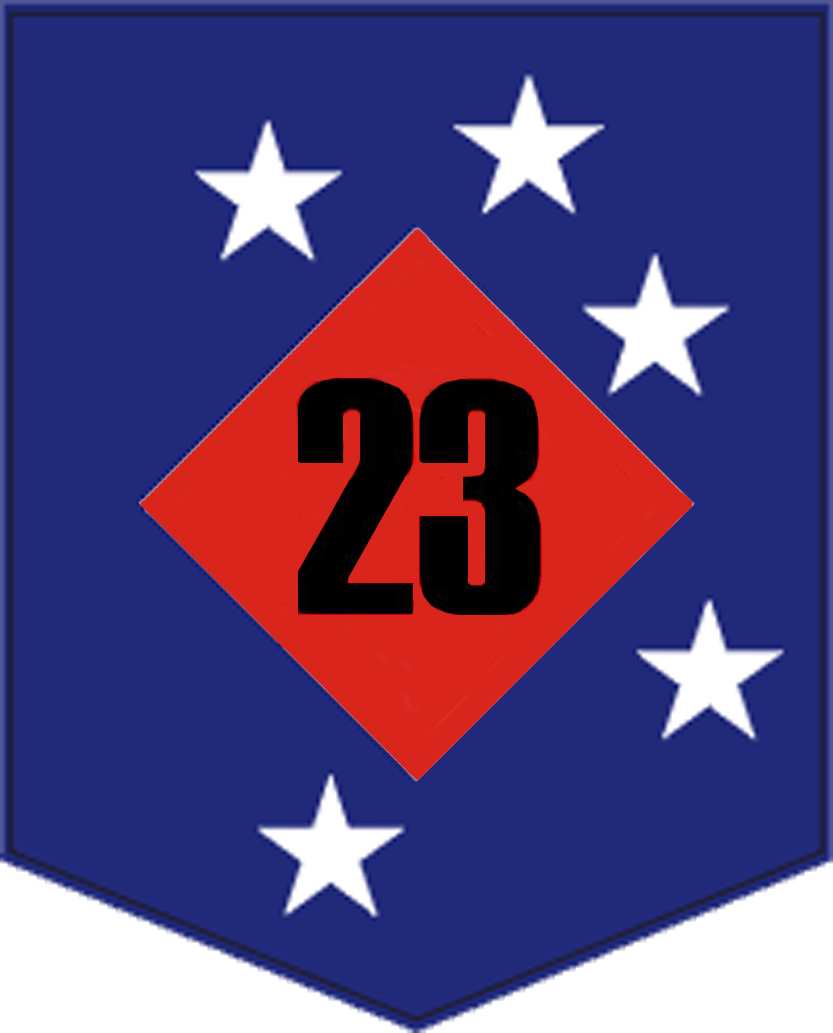

Battalion Name	Insignia	Nickname
1st Battalion 23rd Marines(1-23rd Marines)		Fighting Texans
2nd Battalion 23rd Marines(2-23rd Marines)		Marshall
3rd Battalion 23rd Marines(3-23rd Marines)		

==== 25th Marine Regiment ====
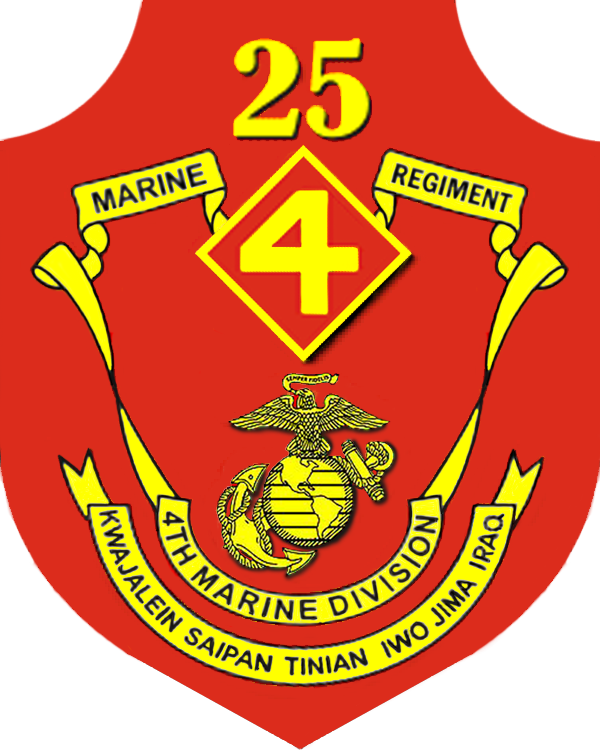

Battalion Name	Insignia	Nickname
1st Battalion 25th Marines(1-25th Marines)		New England's Own
2nd Battalion 25th Marines(2-25th Marines)		Empire Battalion
3rd Battalion 25th Marines(3-25th Marines)		Cold Steel Warriors

==== Other 4th Marine Division battalions ====
Battalion Name	Insignia	Nickname
4th Light Armored Reconnaissance Battalion(4th LARB)		Iron Horse Marines
4th Reconnaissance Battalion(4th Recon)		
4th Combat Engineer Battalion(4th CEB)		
4th Assault Amphibian Battalion(4th AAB)		

== See also ==
- Air Naval Gunfire Liaison Company
- Combined Anti-Armor Team
- Mobile Assault Platoon
- Radio Battalion
  - Radio Reconnaissance Platoon
