= 1st Battalion, 1st Marines =

1st Battalion 1st Marines
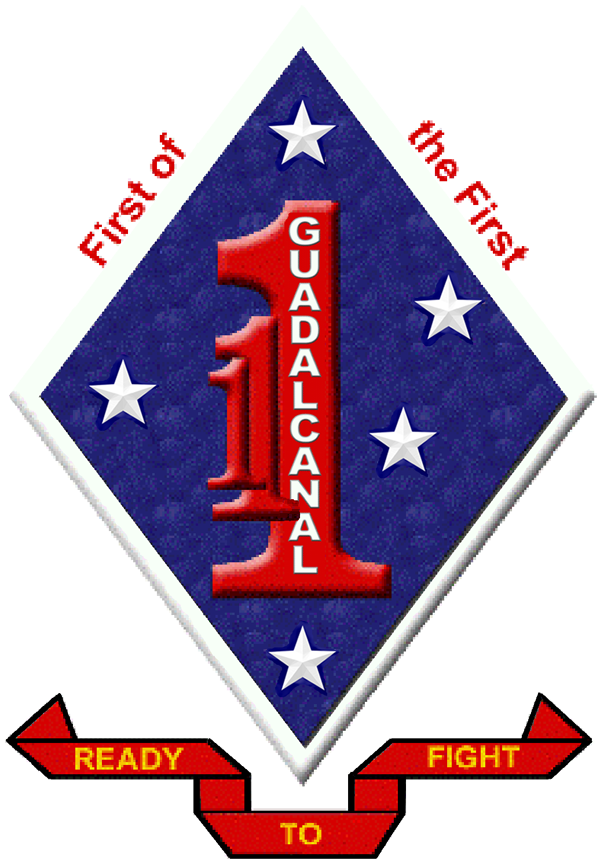
- 1/1st Marines Insignia
- Active: July 10, 1930 – October 31, 1947; August 9, 1950 – May 28, 1974; October 15, 1975 – present
- Country: United States of America
- Branch: United States Marine Corps
- Type: Battalion landing team
- Role: Locate, close with and destroy the enemy by fire and maneuver
- Size: 1,200
- Part of: 1st Marine Regiment; 1st Marine Division
- Garrison/HQ: Marine Corps Base Camp Pendleton
- Nickname: "First of the First"
- Mottos: "Ready to Fight" "Right Of Line, First Of Foot"
- Engagements: World War II; Guadalcanal Campaign; Battle of Cape Gloucester; Battle of Peleliu; Battle of Okinawa; Korean War; Battle of Inchon; Battle of Chosin Reservoir; Vietnam War; Operation Union; Battle of Hue; Operation Desert Storm; Operation Enduring Freedom; Operation Iraqi Freedom; 2003 invasion of Iraq; Operation Phantom Fury

Commanders
- Current commander: LtCol. Clark K. Smith
- Notable commanders: Leonard B. Cresswell; Raymond G. Davis; Austin C. Shofner; William C. Chip

1st Battalion, 1st Marines (1/1) is an infantry battalion in the United States Marine Corps based out of Camp Pendleton, California, consisting of anywhere from 800 to 2,000 Marines and Sailors, but the number fluctuates depending on the battalion's mission. Falling under the command of the 1st Marine Regiment and the 1st Marine Division, they are commonly referred to as "The First of the First".

== Organization ==
1/1st Marines is a battalion-level infantry unit composed of infantry Marines and support personnel.

The battalion has been organized around fire and maneuver warfare in tropical, woodland, desert, or Arctic environments. From at least 1989, the units were organized as such:

- Company A ”Red Death” (Helicopter company) - trained for insertion by (V-22 Osprey, CH-53E Super Stallion)
- Company B “Raiders” (Boat company) - trained for insertion by boats (zodiacs). Also complemented with mountain warfare and various swimming specialties (CWSS, scout swimmer, etc.)
- Company C ”Chosin” (AAV company) - trained for insertion by Assault Amphibious Vehicle.
- Weapons company "Whiskey" - usually split into 3 infantry platoons, each vehicle-borne through a variation of the Humvee.
  - Mortar platoon "No Love" - deploys and deliver 81 mm mortars via a M252 mortar system.
  - Javelin platoon - employs the SMAW and, since its introduction in 2002, the Javelin weapons systems.
  - CAAT platoon - includes heavy machine gunners (the 50-caliber machine gun or the Mk-19) and anti-armor missilemen (employ the TOW-2 missile).
- Headquarters and Service Company “Hades” - The largest company, H&S includes the Battalion Commander and the Sergeant Major. It is organized as such:
  - S-1 (personnel)
  - S-2 (intelligence)
  - S-3 (operations)
  - S-4 (supply and logistics)
  - S-6 (communications)
  - BAS (Battalion Aid Station staffed by U.S. Navy Hospital Corpsmen)

=== Variations ===
Since 2003, after the fall of Saddam Hussein's government, the strategic operations in the Middle East (Iraq, Afghanistan) have encompassed more than just a single objective. For Marine Corps units operating on a tactical level (relative to the Department of Defense) such as a battalion landing team, the actual execution of its traditional mission-oriented operations have adapted depending on the unit's objective (capturing high-value targets, providing stability and support operations, training local police and military units, and a three block war). Some of these operations have demanded reconfiguring the battalion's organization in order to conduct missions which are not included in traditional maneuver warfare (such as fire-team rushing, and anti-armor tactics).

==== Military transition teams ====
Military transition teams (MiT teams) have been used to provide assistance for the transition of power from the coalition forces to the local police and army in Iraq. While these MiT teams would draw personnel from other companies, Marines for other part of the division would often rotate into the battalion for a deployment in order to supplement the various companies' rosters.

==== Infantry company reorganization ====
In addition, the various companies were redrawn in order to reflect their new duties. Normal training was complemented with responsibilities befitting an urban environment:

- Rifle companies (A, B, and C) focused less on fire team rushing and more on variations of it within an urban environment (accounting for the 360 degree fields of fire of the enemy and the possibilities of improvised explosive devices).
- The mortar platoon of the Weapons company (usually resigned to the rear of the fighting line in linear warfare in order to set up and deliver indirect mortar projectiles) has experimented with various vehicle of mortarmen as riflemen.
- Weapons company utilized Mobile Assault Platoons to provide quick reaction and mobility in urban missions.

=== 1/1 in a MEU (SOC) ===
When trained as a battalion landing team, the battalion can attach to a Marine Expeditionary Unit and become the ground combat element. This designation gives the battalion a much broader role in its employment with the Navy, including non-combatant evacuation operations (NEO), humanitarian assistance operations (HAO), and ship-to-shore deployment (via air and sea).

== History ==
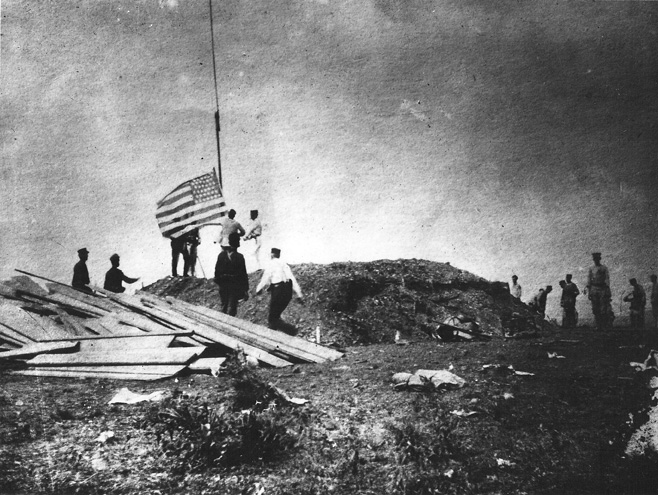
1st Marine Battalion raising the United States flag at the Battle of Guantánamo Bay on June 10, 1898.

=== World War II ===
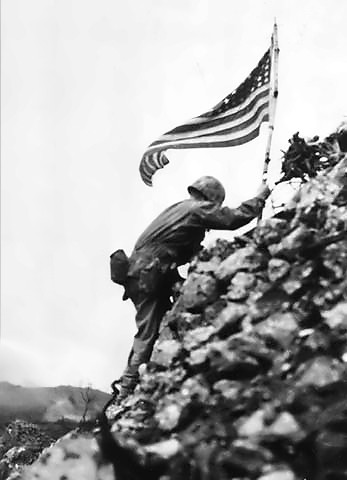
Lt Col Richard P. Ross, commander of 1st Battalion, 1st Marines braves sniper fire to place the division's colors on a parapet of Shuri Castle on May 30, 1945. This flag was first raised over Cape Gloucester and then Peleliu.

1st Battalion 1st Marines was activated on March 1, 1941, at Guantanamo Bay, Cuba. A month later they redeployed to Marine Corps Recruit Depot Parris Island, South Carolina, but were quickly deactivated on June 18, 1941.

1/1 was reactivated on February 7, 1942, at New River, North Carolina. After a few months of training they were deployed to Wellington, New Zealand in July 1942. During the War in the Pacific the battalion fought in the following campaigns:

- Battle of Guadalcanal
- Battle of New Britain
- Battle of Peleliu
- Battle of Okinawa

Following the end of the war 1/1 returned to MCB Camp Pendleton in September 1945 and were deactivated on October 31, 1947.

=== Korean War ===
Following the outbreak of the Korean War, 1/1 was reactivated at MCB Camp Pendleton on August 9, 1950. Later that month they deployed to Kobe, Japan and from there took part in the amphibious landing during the Battle of Inchon. In October, the Marines were withdrawn from the Seoul area and moved to the east coast of Korea landing at Wosnan in late October. From there 1st Battalion 1st Marines participated in the Battle of Chosin Reservoir. They pushed as far north as Koto-ri, spending much of the battle defending their perimeter in this vicinity.

The battalion spent much of the remainder of the war defending the thirty-eighth parallel. All told, it fought in the Korean War from September 1950 through July 1953.

Following the war, the battalion participated in the defense of the Korean Demilitarized Zone from July 1953 to April 1955.

=== Vietnam War ===
1/1 deployed to Da Nang, Republic of Vietnam in August 1965, under the command of LtCol Donald V. McCloskey, and were reassigned to the 3rd Marine Division. They remained in Vietnam until May 1971, serving in or around Da Nang, Đông Hà, Con Thien, Quảng Trị, Huế, Phu Bai and Khe Sanh. They returned to Camp Pendleton, California, in May 1971. They were again deactivated on May 28, 1974, but quickly reinstated on October 15, 1975.

=== Persian Gulf War and the 1990s ===
The 1st Battalion, 1st Marines deployed from Marine Corps Base Camp Pendleton in December 1990 to Saudi Arabia in part of a call to defend the Kingdom of Saudi Arabia from the Iraqi dictator Saddam Hussein in Operation Desert Shield. In the coming months, Regimental Combat Team 1 became Task Force Papa Bear, along with Companies Bravo and Charlie of the 3rd Assault Amphibian Battalion; 3rd Battalion, 9th Marines; 1st Tank Battalion; 1st Combat Engineer Battalion and 3rd Low Altitude Air Defense Battalion. After the start of Operation Desert Storm in February 1991, the Mechanized Battalion saw considerable combat as it crossed into Kuwait and fought a pitched armored battle at Al Burquan, and consolidated at Kuwait International Airport on February 27, 1991. After completing a search of a downed OV-10 reconnaissance aircraft on March 10, the battalion backloaded on April 24 to Camp Pendleton.

=== Global War on Terror ===
On September 11, 2001, the Marines of 1/1 were deployed on a WestPac (a deployment in an Amphibious Ready Group (ARG) making rounds in the Western Pacific) as part of the 15th MEU. Specifically, they were in Darwin, Australia on port leave. The Marines were recalled early from leave, shipped out, and began preparing for the first major combat operations since the first Gulf War. The flotilla sped to the Persian Gulf and was the first MEU to land in Afghanistan. Later, the 26th MEU would join them and assist in Operation Enduring Freedom.

==== Afghanistan invasion ====
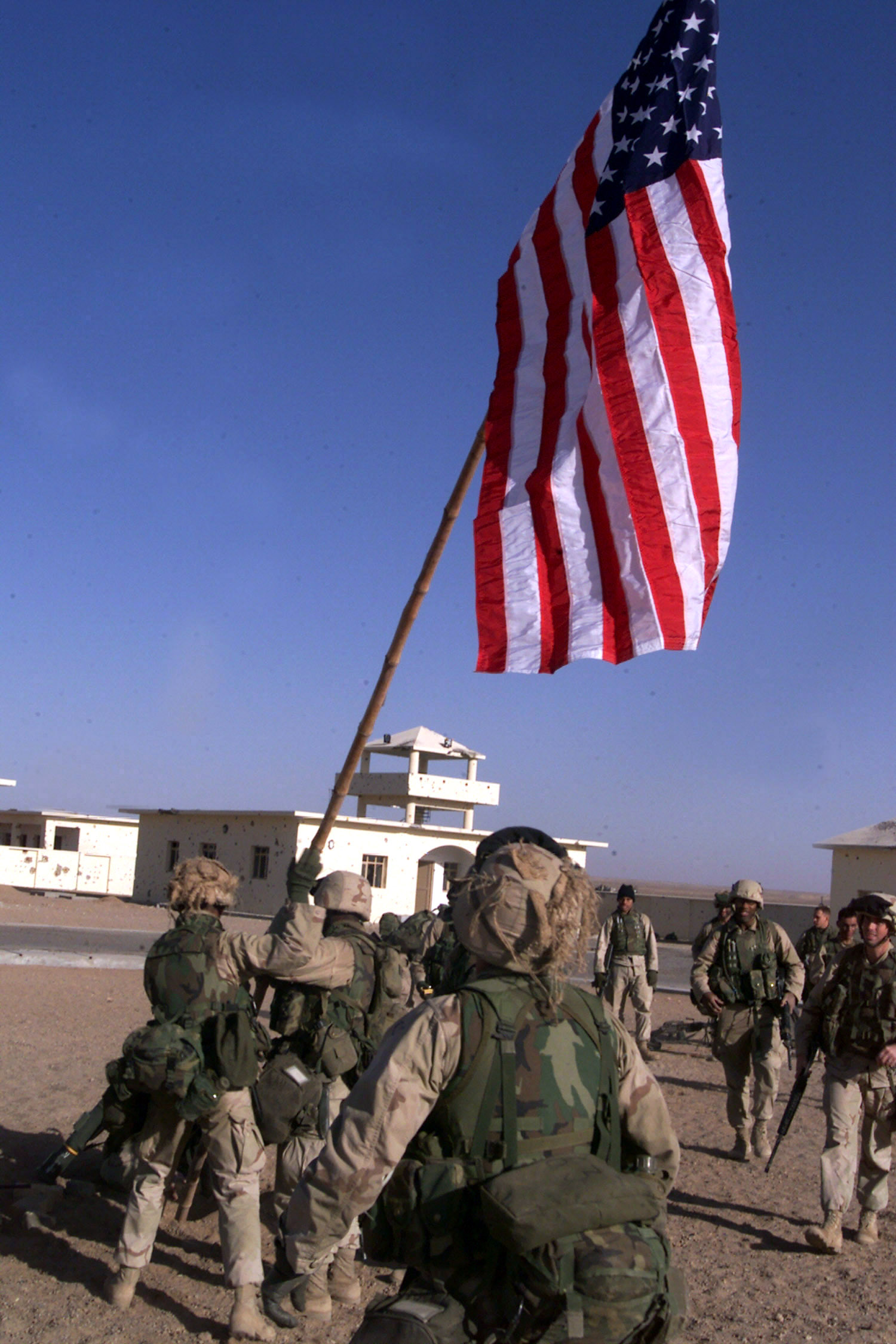
Marines from Battalion Landing Team 1/1 of the 15th Marine Expeditionary Unit raise the first U.S. flag at Camp Rhino during Operation Enduring Freedom, 25 November 2001

Among 1/1's missions in Afghanistan was to assist in securing an airstrip outside Kandahar, Afghanistan and establish Camp Rhino. The Marine battalion performed security operations around the area in support of the Northern Alliance's removal of the Taliban from power. The battalion also performed operations in Northern Pakistan. The Marines returned to the United States in early March 2002. 1/1 also deployed to Afghanistan in July 2012 until December 8 in which they operated throughout Helmand Province. Following the attack on Camp Leatherneck they were extended until December 8, 2012, when they returned to Camp Pendleton.

==== Operation Iraqi Freedom ====
The unit deployed in support of OIF I, assisted the local police and performed security operations in southern Iraq, mainly Um Qasar and Basra, co-located with British units there. After 2 weeks, the unit left the country, finished their West-PAC deployment and returned to Camp Pendleton.

Later, as part of the 15th Marine Expeditionary Unit on the first Naval Expeditionary Strike Group-1 (ESG 1), they deployed in early 2005 to the western Pacific. During this deployment, they provided aid for the tsunami that hit Indonesia and Sri Lanka. After 3 weeks of assistance, the MEU headed for the Persian Gulf. There, they provided safety and security operations in Babil province south of Baghdad. Their forward operating base was Camp Falcon near Al-Mahmoudiyah and they spent 1 month there. The combat units performed continuous foot and vehicle patrols in the area, finding weapons caches and unearthing IEDs. One Marine was wounded in action during this deployment.

1/1 handed off the territory to 3rd Armored Cavalry Regiment (3ACR), which, after staying for many months, endured much less violence and conflict. A PBS documentary on the unit, Warriors, by Ed Robbins, documents this unit's deployment.

In January 2005 the unit deployed to aid in Operation Unified Assistance, the U.S. humanitarian response to the 2004 Indian Ocean earthquake and tsunami.

The unit returned to Camp Pendleton in mid-2005 and prepared again to deploy in 6 months. They departed Camp Pendleton beginning on January 21, 2006. They were operating in Fallujah but in March, C Company along with MAP 2 & 3 of Wpns Company began operations in the area around Abu Ghraib prison which is located about 20 miles (32 km) west of Baghdad. After two and a half months, Charlie Company returned to the Camp Fallujah area and the entire battalion was re-united in Karmah. C Company later moved to Saqlawiyah to replace 1st Battalion, 25th Marines. The battalion completed their deployment and returned to Camp Pendleton in mid-August 2006. 1/1 suffered 11 KIA'S on this deployment and more than 50 wounded.

1/1 deployed back to Al Anbar Province in mid-July 2007 to areas around Habbaniyah, Iraq. They were relieved by 2nd Battalion, 24th Marines on 6 February 2008.

The 13th Marine Expeditionary Unit (MEU), including 1st Battalion, 1st Marines (1/1), deployed in 2008-2009 and supported anti-piracy operations in the Gulf of Aden off the coast of Somalia. They were part of Combined Task Force 150 focused on ensuring maritime security and deterring piracy, which had become a significant threat to international shipping.

==== Operation Enduring Freedom; Return to Afghanistan ====
In June 2012, after 11 years, 1/1 returned to Afghanistan to operate in Helmand Province as part of Regimental Combat Team 6 as part of the counter insurgency effort operating around the town of Agha Ahmad, Khanashin, Kajaki, and the Nawa district and around Camp Leatherneck. They would be withdrawn by December 2012.

Between September 2014 and June 2015, elements of 1/1 participated in OEF in Yemen.

== Notable former members ==
- Robert H. Barrow, served as A Company Commander during the Korean War, later became 27th Commandant of the Marine Corps
- Jim Beaver, actor
- John Canley, Gunnery Sergeant with A Company, Medal of Honor recipient, Battle of Huế
- Raymond Gilbert Davis, Medal of Honor recipient, general officer who served in the Pacific, Korean, and Vietnam Wars.
- Adam Driver, actor, served in 81mm Mortar Section.
- W. D. Ehrhart, writer and poet
- Nathaniel Fick, wrote One Bullet Away: The Making of a Marine Officer, an autobiography about the Global War on Terror in Iraq and Afghanistan
- Alfredo Cantu Gonzalez, Medal of Honor recipient (posthumously), Battle of Huế
- Robert Neller, served as A Company Commander during the battalion's Western Pacific deployment in 1982, later became 37th Commandant of the Marine Corps
- Everett P. Pope, Medal of Honor recipient, Battle of Peleliu
- James McCain, son of senator John McCain
- Ray L. Smith, served as A Company Commander during the Vietnam War
- Austin Shofner, former POW who escaped Japanese captivity, served as Commanding Officer during the Battle of Okinawa
- Chesty Puller, "At the outbreak of the Korean War, Puller was once again assigned as commander of the 1st Marine Regiment. He participated in the landing at Inchon on September 15, 1950, and was awarded the Silver Star Medal.[23] For leadership from September 15 through November 2, he was awarded his second Legion of Merit. He was awarded the Distinguished Service Cross from the U.S. Army for heroism in action from November 29 to December 4, and his fifth Navy Cross for heroism during December 5–10, 1950, at the Battle of Chosin Reservoir. It was during that battle that he said the famous line, 'We've been looking for the enemy for some time now. We've finally found him. We're surrounded. That simplifies things."'"

== Unit awards ==
A unit citation or commendation is an award bestowed upon an organization for the action cited. Members of the unit who participated in said actions are allowed to wear on their uniforms the awarded citation. 1/1 has been presented with the following awards:

Ribbon	Unit Award & Campaign Streamers
	Presidential Unit Citation with two Silver Stars
	Navy Unit Commendation with one Bronze Star
	Meritorious Unit Commendation
	World War I Victory Medal with one Bronze Star
	American Defense Service Medal with one Bronze Star
	Asiatic-Pacific Campaign Medal with one Bronze Star
	World War II Victory Medal
	Navy Occupation Service Medal with Asia clasp
	China Service Medal
	National Defense Service Medal with three Bronze Stars
	Korean Service Medal with two Silver Stars
	Armed Forces Expeditionary Medal
	Vietnam Service Medal with two Silver Stars and three Bronze Stars
	Southwest Asia Service Medal
	Global War on Terrorism Expeditionary Medal
	Afghanistan Campaign Medal
	Iraq Campaign Medal
	Global War on Terrorism Service Medal
	Korean Presidential unit Citation
	Vietnam Cross of Gallantry with Palm Streamer
	Vietnam Meritorious Unit Citation Civil Action Medal

== See also ==
- List of United States Marine Corps battalions
- Organization of the United States Marine Corps
