= Weapons company =

Type of military unit

A weapons company, sometimes called a manoeuvre support company, is a company-sized military unit attached to an infantry battalion to support the rifle companies of the battalion. It usually possesses some combination of machine-guns, mortars, anti-tank missiles, anti-aircraft missiles, reconnaissance vehicles and, sometimes, assault pioneers (infantrymen specially trained in the assault role).

== British Army ==
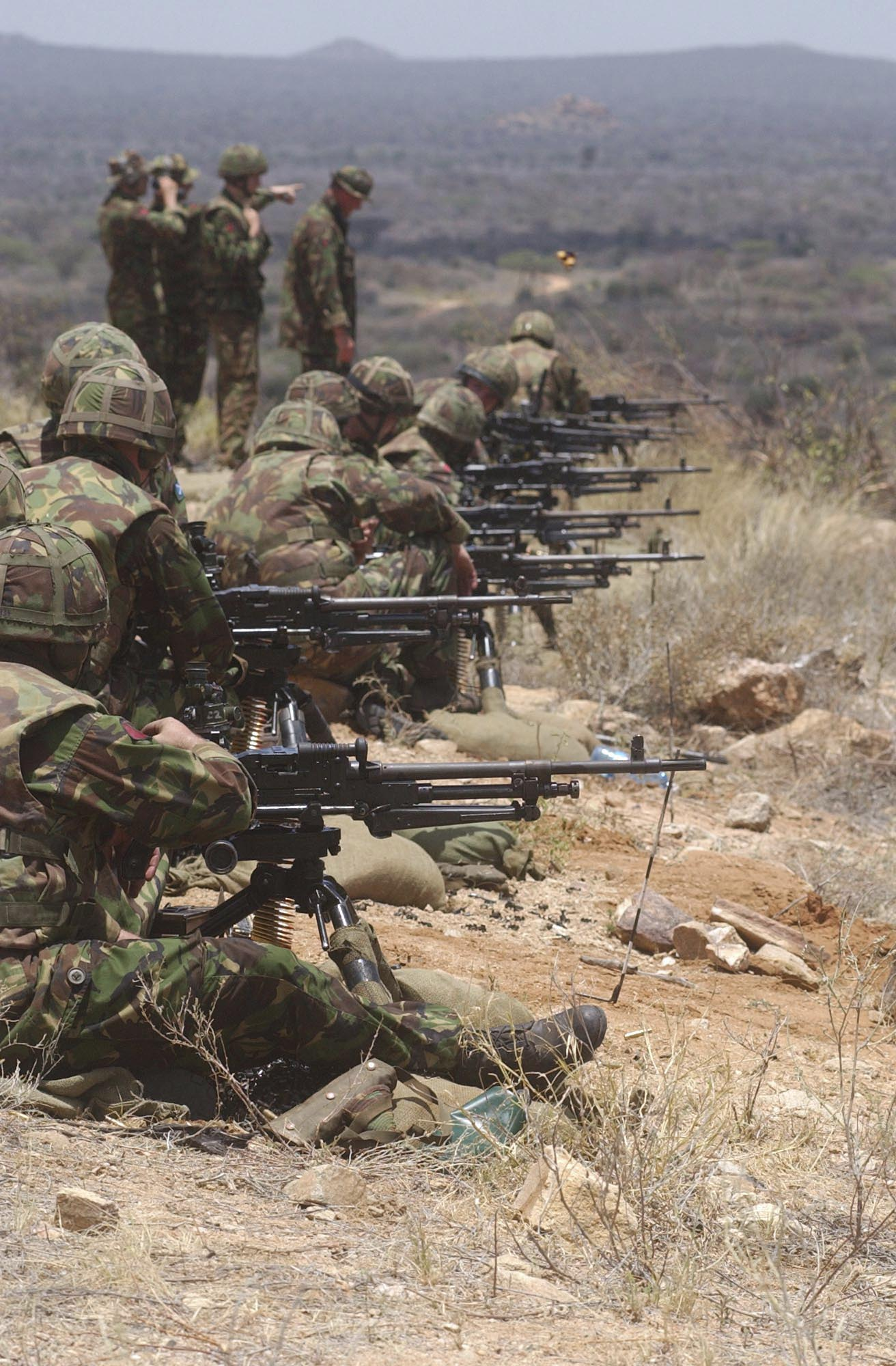
Machine Gun platoon of Support Company 1st Battalion Worcestershire and Sherwood Foresters Regiment during exercise 'Grand Prix' in Kenya

In the British Army, the manoeuvre support company possesses an Anti-Tank platoon armed with 8 Javelin missile launchers, a reconnaissance platoon, a mortar platoon (with eight L16 81mm mortars), an assault pioneer platoon, and, in the case of Light Role battalions, a machine gun platoon (with nine FN MAG general purpose machine guns).

== United States Marine Corps ==
In the United States Marine Corps, the infantry battalion weapons company is tasked with providing supporting fire for the three rifle companies that (along with the battalion's headquarters and service company) make up the remaining balance of the battalion. The weapons company provides organic fire support coordination, mortar, anti-armor, and heavy machine gun support.

The company is often organized into four distinct elements: company headquarters, mortar platoon (utilizing the M252 81mm mortar), anti-armor platoon (utilizing the FGM-148 Javelin and BGM-71 TOW missile systems), and a heavy machine gun platoon (equipped with the 12.7 mm M2 .50 caliber machinegun, and MK-19 40mm automatic grenade launcher).

The company headquarters consists of the company commander (CO), executive officer (XO), first sergeant, operations chief, property NCO, and two drivers.

The mortar platoon is organized with a five-man platoon headquarters (platoon commander, platoon sergeant, ammunition technician, and two ammunition men) and two 32-man mortar sections. Each mortar section contains an eight-man section headquarters, which includes a section leader, two ammunition men and a fire direction center with two forward observers (FOs), and four six-man mortar squads. Each mortar squad comprises a squad leader, a gunner, an assistant gunner, and three ammunition men. The platoon's two sections are often placed in direct support of one of the two forward rifle companies (using the Marine Corps' standard "two up, one back" tactical disposition doctrine, which places two maneuver elements forward with one maneuver element behind, allowing for exploiting an attack or reinforcing a defense). The FOs are attached (along with a radio operator from the mortar party in the battalion's communication platoon) to one of the battalion's rifle companies or rifle platoons.

The anti-armor platoon contains a small platoon headquarters (platoon commander, platoon sergeant, and driver), an anti-armor (Javelin missile system) section, and a TOW (heavy anti-tank missile system) section. The anti-armor section is usually dismounted and consists of a section leader and two eight-man anti-armor squads, each divided into two four-man teams equipped with two missile launchers each. The anti-armor section is usually attached by squad to one of the two forward rifle companies, with one team attached to each of the two forward rifle platoons. The TOW section consists of a section leader and driver/radio operator and four five-man TOW squads. Each TOW squad has a squad leader, two gunners, and two assistant gunners/drivers and is equipped with two TOW launchers and two vehicles.

In addition to a small platoon headquarters (platoon commander, platoon sergeant, and two ammunition men/drivers), the heavy machine gun platoon has three eight-man heavy machine gun sections, each consisting of two four-man squads consisting of a squad leader, gunner, assistant gunner, and an ammunition man/driver. Each machine gun squad is equipped with one heavy machine gun (either 12.7 mm or 40 mm) and a vehicle.

Often, assets from the anti-armor and heavy machine gun platoons are used to form one or several Combined Anti-Armor Teams (CAAT). A CAAT platoon is highly mobile, utilizing Humvees and occasionally a few Mine Resistant Ambush Protected vehicles.A typical organization would have three squads with five vehicles each, three armed with machine guns and two vehicles with the TOW. The remaining anti-armor unit is often trained as an ad hoc assault, demolitions, and breaching unit.

With the Wars in Iraq and Afghanistan, the need for specific Anti-Armor capabilities often became negligible given the lack of up-armored threats from Insurgents. As such, CAAT platoons were at times deemed inefficient by Commanders. These CAAT Platoons at times were then reorganized into Mobile Assault Platoons.

The 81mm mortar platoon also gives the battalion a heavier organic "artillery", as it supplements the smaller M224 60mm mortars found in each rifle company. Company commanders can often expect to receive organic mortar support in less time than artillery would normally take to receive orders, plot position, target guns, and fire. The heavier machine guns also allow the commander heavier fire (in both volume and caliber) than is possible with the M240 machine gun and the M249 squad automatic weapon found in the machine gun section of the rifle company weapons platoon, and in the rifle squads of the rifle platoons, respectively.

== US Army Weapons Company in WWII ==
A February 1944 Table of organization and equipment on a US Army WWII weapons company:

- 28-man Company Headquarters, two Machine Gun platoons and a Mortar platoon.
- The Company HQ was armed with a single .50 caliber M2 Browning heavy machine gun
- The Machine Gun platoons were each made up of a six-man HQ and two 15-man Machine Gun sections, each section armed with two .30 caliber M1917 Browning machine guns. Each platoon would be armed with four .30 caliber machine guns, for a total of eight .30 caliber machine guns in the whole company. A total of 36 men in each machine gun platoon.
- The Mortar Platoon was made up of a six-man HQ and three 18-man mortar sections, each section armed with two 81mm M1 mortars. A total of six mortars and 60 men. A significant proportion of these 60 men were ammunition bearers.
- The HQs for the three platoons were also armed with two bazooka rocket launchers each. A total of six bazookas in the whole company.
- A full-strength Weapons Company had 160 men in total, including eight officers. Apart from the special weapons, 82 of the men were issued with the light M1 carbine and 44 being issued the heavier M1 Garand rifle. 30 of those armed with the M1 rifle were also issued with the M7 and M8 grenade launcher. The remaining 34 men were armed with the M1911 pistol as their sidearm.

== Wehrmacht Heavy Weapons Company in WW2 ==
A May 1944 Table of organization and equipment show the following details about a German WW2 Heavy Weapons Company:

- A Heavy Weapons Company was made up of a 20-man Company Headquarters, a Heavy Machine Gun Platoon, an 8-cm Mortar Platoon and a 12-cm Mortar Platoon.
- The Heavy Machine Gun Platoon was made up of a 10-man HQ and three 15-man Machine Gun Squads, each squad armed with two 7.92mm MG 34 or MG 42 machine guns. A total of 6 machine guns and 55 men in the platoon.
- The 8-cm Mortar Platoon was made up of a 12-man HQ and three 18-man Mortar Squads, each squad armed with two 8 cm Granatwerfer 34 mortars. A total of six 8-cm Mortars and 66 men in the platoon.
- The 12-cm Mortar Platoon was made up of a 17-man HQ and four six or seven-man Mortar Teams, each team armed with a single 12-cm Granatwerfer 42 mortar. A total of four 12-cm Mortars and 47 men in the platoon.
- A full-strength Heavy Weapons Company had 205 men in total, including three officers. Apart from the special weapons, 129 men were issued either the Gewehr 98 rifle or Karabiner 98k carbine. 29 men were armed with the MP 40 submachine gun. The remainder of the men were issue with either the Walther P38 or Luger pistol as sidearms.
- The company was also issued with 2 bicycles and 51 horses.

Changes were made to the company after Normandy:

- In Infantry Battalions, the Heavy Weapons Company replaced the Machine Gun platoon with an Anti-tank platoon consisting of soldiers armed with Panzerschreck or Panzerfaust anti-tank rockets.
- In Grenadier Battalions, the 12-cm Mortar Battalion was removed and replaced by a second Heavy Machine Gun platoon. An infantry support gun platoon was also added, armed with four 7.5 cm le.IG 18 infantry guns.
