= Justin LeHew =

United States Marine (born 1970)

Justin D. LeHew
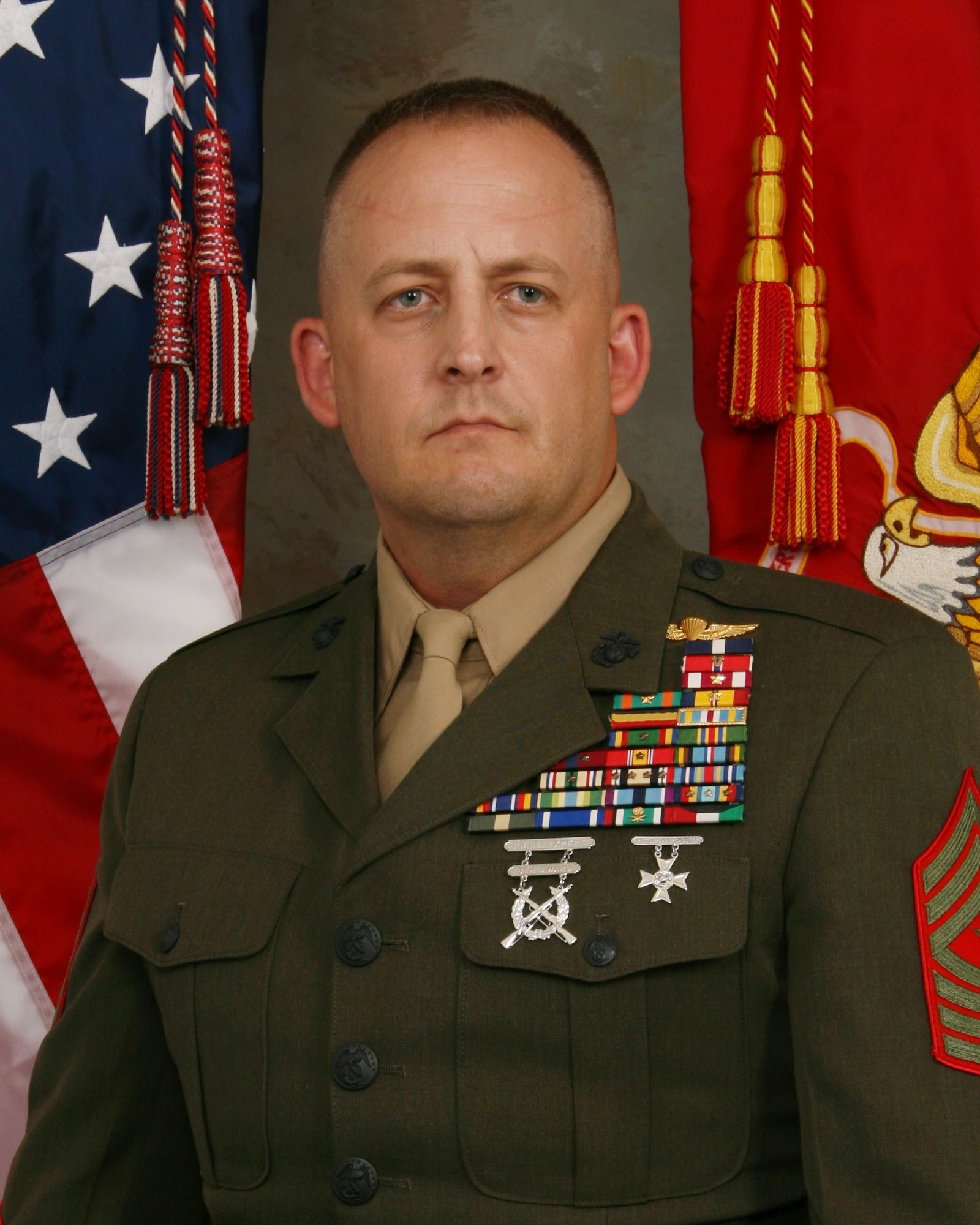
- Justin LeHew
- Born: 2 January 1970 (age 56); Columbus Grove, Ohio, U.S.
- Military career
- Allegiance: United States of America
- Branch: United States Marine Corps
- Service years: 1988–2018
- Rank: Sergeant major
- Nickname: The Hero of Nasiriyah
- Unit: United States Marine Corps
- Conflicts: Iraq War; Bosnia-Herzegovina; Operation Desert Storm
- Awards: Navy Cross; Legion of Merit; Bronze Star Medal with Valor device Meritorious Service Medal

Justin D. LeHew (born 2 January 1970 in Columbus Grove, Ohio) is a United States Marine who served in the war on terror. He was awarded the Navy Cross for his actions on 23 and 24 March 2003 during the initial 2003 invasion of Iraq. He was hand picked to spearhead the rescue operation and recovery of the U.S. Army's 507th Maintenance Company on 23 March and subsequently was called upon again to take part in the rescue operation of US Army Private Jessica Lynch on 1 April 2003. He is also a recipient of the Bronze Star with Combat Distinguishing Device denoting Valor for his heroic actions from 5 to 28 August 2004 during the Battle of Najaf.

== Marine Corps career ==
LeHew was born on 2 January 1970 in Columbus Grove, Ohio and enlisted in the Marine Corps 11 July 1988. After graduating recruit training at Marine Corps Recruit Depot Parris Island, South Carolina, as a private first class, LeHew reported to Marine Corps Base Camp Pendleton, California for training as an assault amphibian crewman.

Upon completion of school in January 1989, LeHew received orders to report to Company A, 2nd Assault Amphibian Battalion at Marine Corps Base Camp Lejeune, North Carolina and deployed with Company A in the spring of 1989 to Okinawa before moving to H&S Company in the fall of the same year to deploy with UNITAS 31 throughout South America.

Upon returning from South America as a lance corporal, LeHew immediately deployed to Southwest Asia with the battalion in January 1991 and participated in Operation Desert Storm.

After returning to the states in July 1991 as a corporal, LeHew transferred to Company C for service as an assault amphibian vehicle crew chief. He then deployed with the 26th Marine Expeditionary Unit as a section leader in April 1993 and participated in Operation Provide Promise and Operation Deny Flight in Bosnia-Herzegovina.

In January 1994, as a sergeant, LeHew received orders back to Camp Pendleton for duty as an instructor at the Assault Amphibian School.

From January 1994 to October 1996, LeHew served in a variety of billets at the school ranging from crew chief, class commander, platoon sergeant and classroom instructor and was named Instructor of the Year for two consecutive years at the school. He also attended the Basic Vehicle Repairman Course during this time and received a secondary military occupational specialty as an AAV mechanic.

In October 1996, LeHew graduated Drill Instructor School at MCRD San Diego and reported to Company G, 2nd Recruit Training Battalion, where he served as drill instructor, senior drill instructor and academics instructor. During this period, as a staff sergeant, LeHew was a two-time winner of the Dan Daly Award, which is presented to the most inspirational drill instructor.

From January 2000 to October 2002, as a gunnery sergeant, LeHew returned to Camp LeJeune for duty as a platoon sergeant with Company D, 2nd Assault Amphibian Battalion.

In October 2002, LeHew transferred to Company A for service as platoon sergeant for 3rd platoon and deployed in January 2003 to Operation Iraqi Freedom with Regimental Combat Team 2 and Task Force Tarawa. On March 23, 2003, LeHew was an assault amphibian vehicle platoon sergeant who was leading an armored column into the city of Nasiriyah when he was called upon to rescue the remaining soldiers of the ill-fated US Army 507th Maintenance Company led by Captain Troy King, who was ambushed just hours earlier. After the Marine column rescued the soldiers, the attack continued into the streets of the city where, during a day of unrelenting and viscous house-to-house, street-to-street, close-quarters urban combat, he bolstered a defensive perimeter to repel numerous waves of Saddam Fedayeen attackers, directed tank and infantry fires, rescued or retrieved 7 more US Marines after their vehicle was destroyed by rocket-propelled grenade fire and coordinated an air medical evacuation of all wounded and dead US troops during the fight for the Southern Bridge in the city. LeHew was also later involved in the rescue and recovery operation of US Army Private Jessica Lynch from the hospital in Nasiriya. During this battle, LeHew was awarded the Navy Cross for heroic actions in close-quarters combat in the city as well as calmly calling in air strikes and tank/infantry fires to neutralize enemy targets in the midst of chaos. In an incredible show of determination and strength, it was witnessed by multiple Marines that LeHew personally carried a "6'4", 240 lb severely wounded Marine corporal to safety over a distance of 200 yards under a hailstorm of small arms, machine gun and rocket-propelled grenade fire, saving the man's life.

In June 2003, LeHew received orders to transfer once again back to Camp Pendleton for service with Company A, 3rd Assault Amphibian Battalion as company operations chief.

In January 2004 LeHew reported for duty as company first sergeant, Company C, 1st Battalion, 4th Marines (1/4) and immediately deployed in May 2004 with BLT 1/4 in support of Operation Iraqi Freedom II. He distinguished himself in combat once again during the battle of Najaf from 5 to 28 August 2004, earning the Bronze Star with combat distinguishing device for his heroic actions against the Mahdi Army of Moqtada al-Sadr. He is most notably remembered by his men for purposely exposing himself on numerous occasions to draw enemy sniper fire away from his men to allow them to maneuver and neutralize the enemy position, ultimately saving many Marines' lives, in addition to personally treating and carrying a Marine out of the Wadi A Salaam cemetery in his arms with a sucking chest wound over 100 meters under fire, saving his Marine's life.

LeHew transferred to 1st Reconnaissance Battalion upon return to CONUS and served as both Company A and Company D first sergeant simultaneously for a two-year period in addition to reactivating 1st Force Reconnaissance Company. Upon promotion to sergeant major in the fall of 2007, LeHew was personally requested by the division to remain on as the battalion sergeant major and deploy the battalion once again to Iraq for combat operations. LeHew transferred from the battalion upon return to the United States in March 2010 and was assigned to the Assault Amphibian School. LeHew transferred from the Assault Amphibian School in April 2011 and was assigned as the regimental sergeant major of the 3rd Marine Regiment in Kaneohe Bay Hawaii. In July 2013, LeHew was selected to serve as the Training and Education Command (TECOM) sergeant major located at Marine Corps Base Quantico, Virginia, and remained in that position until his retirement from the United States Marine Corps

In 2010, LeHew was honored by the corps with an obstacle named in his honor at Marine Corps Recruit Depot Parris Island, South Carolina. "LeHew's Challenge" is an 8 ft high suspended log supported by two pedestals that is part of the famed 54-hour crucible event which culminates the basic training of a United States Marine. Every recruit, both male and female, hear from their drill instructors about the heroism displayed by then LeHew and the story is used to inspire Marine recruits to work together to overcome the obstacle and complete the task at hand.

LeHew was inducted into the Ohio Military Hall of Fame on 4 May 2012.

Since his retirement, LeHew has become the chief operating officer for a MIA search and recovery organization named History Flight.

== Navy Cross citation ==
The President of the United States

Takes Pleasure in Presenting
The Navy Cross
To
Justin D. Lehew
Gunnery Sergeant, United States Marine Corps

For Services as Set Forth in the Following Citation:

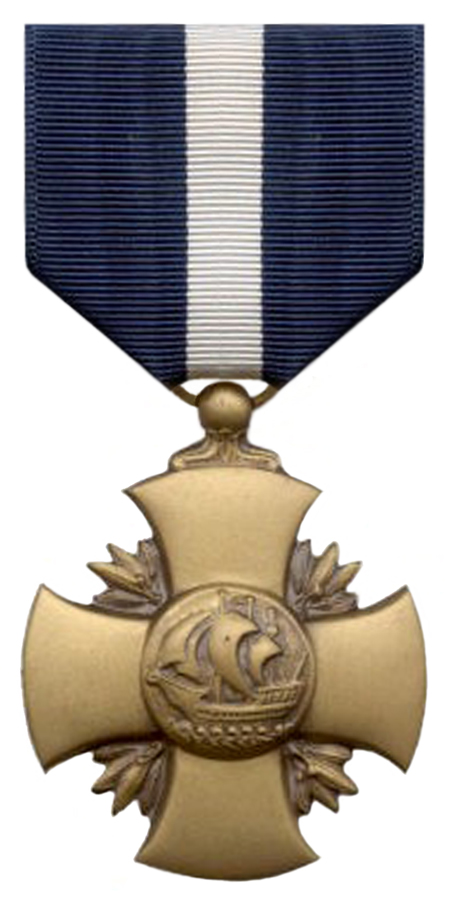

For extraordinary heroism as Amphibious Assault Platoon Sergeant, Company A, Task Force Tarawa, I Marine Expeditionary Force in support of Operation IRAQI FREEDOM on 23 and 24 March 2003. As Regimental Combat Team 2 attacked north towards An Nasiriyah, Iraq, lead elements of the Battalion came under heavy enemy fire. When the beleaguered United States Army 507th Maintenance Company convoy was spotted in the distance, Gunnery Sergeant Lehew and his crew were dispatched to rescue the soldiers. Under constant enemy fire, he led the rescue team to the soldiers. With total disregard for his own welfare, he assisted the evacuation effort of four soldiers, two of whom were critically wounded. While still receiving enemy fire, he climbed back into his vehicle and immediately began suppressing enemy infantry. During the subsequent company attack on the eastern bridge over the Euphrates River, Gunnery Sergeant Lehew continuously exposed himself to withering enemy fire during the three-hour urban firefight. His courageous battlefield presence inspired his Marines to fight a determined foe and allowed him to position his platoon's heavy machine guns to repel numerous waves of attackers. In the midst of the battle, an Amphibious Assault Vehicle was destroyed, killing or wounding all its occupants. Gunnery Sergeant Lehew immediately moved to recover the nine Marines. He again exposed himself to a barrage of fire as he worked for nearly an hour recovering casualties from the wreckage. By his outstanding display of decisive leadership, unlimited courage in the face of heavy enemy fire, and utmost devotion to duty, Gunnery Sergeant Lehew reflected great credit upon himself and upheld the highest traditions of the Marine Corps and the United States Naval Service.

== Military Awards ==

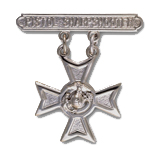

Badge	Navy and Marine Corps Parachutist Insignia			
1st Row	Navy Cross	Legion of Merit w/ 1 award star	Bronze Star w/ valor device	Meritorious Service Medal w/ 1 award star
2nd Row	Navy and Marine Corps Achievement Medal w/ 1 award star	Combat Action Ribbon w/ 1 award star	Navy Presidential Unit Citation	Joint Meritorious Unit Award
3rd Row	Navy Unit Commendation w/ 1 service star	Navy Meritorious Unit Commendation	Marine Corps Good Conduct Medal w/ 6 service stars	National Defense Service Medal w/ 1 service star
4th Row	Armed Forces Expeditionary Medal	Southwest Asia Service Medal w/ 1 campaign star	Iraq Campaign Medal w/ 4 campaign stars	Global War on Terrorism Expeditionary Medal
5th Row	Global War on Terrorism Service Medal	Armed Forces Service Medal	Humanitarian Service Medal	Sea Service Deployment Ribbon w/ 7 service stars
6th Row	Marine Corps Drill Instructor Ribbon	NATO Medal for the former Yugoslavia	Kuwait Liberation Medal (Saudi Arabia)	Kuwait Liberation Medal (Kuwait)
Badges	Expert marksmanship badge for rifle (2nd award)		Sharpshooter marksmanship badge for pistol	

== See also ==
- List of U.S. Marines
