= 3rd Assault Amphibian Battalion =

Assault amphibian battalion

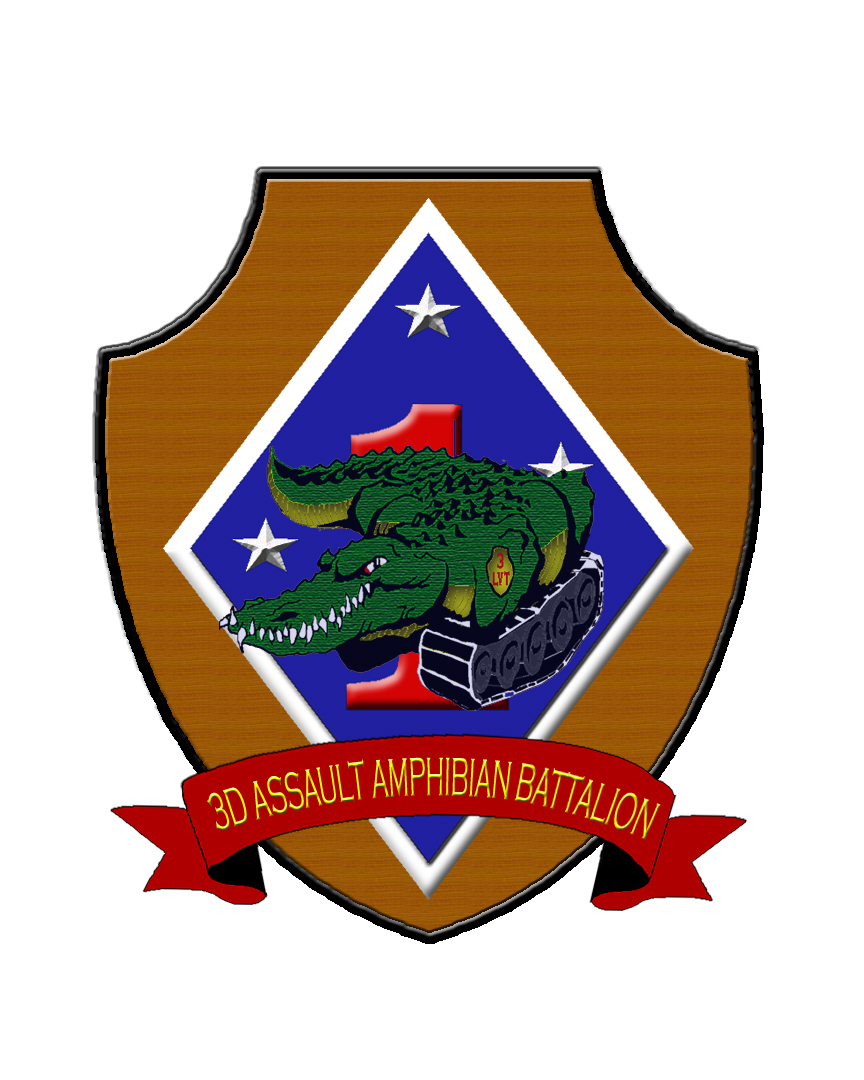
- 3rd AABn Insignia
- Active: September 16, 1942 – present
- Country: United States of America
- Branch: United States Marine Corps
- Type: Assault Amphibian Battalion
- Role: Amphibious assault
- Size: Over 1,000 Marines
- Part of: 1st Marine Division; I Marine Expeditionary Force
- Garrison/HQ: Marine Corps Base Camp Pendleton; Marine Corps Air Ground Combat Center Twentynine Palms, California
- Nickname: 3rd Tracks
- Patron: Archangel Michael
- Mascot: Gator
- Engagements: World War II: Battle of Bougainville; Battle of Guam; Battle of Iwo Jima; Vietnam War Operation Desert Storm Operation Iraqi Freedom: 2003 invasion of Iraq

Commanders
- Current commander: LtCol Frederick D. Monday

3rd Assault Amphibian Battalion (3rd AABn) is one of two active duty assault amphibian battalions in the United States Marine Corps. The battalion is tasked with transporting US Marine forces and their equipment from assault ships to shore, and equipped with the Amphibious Combat Vehicle (ACV), which replaced the Amphibious Assault Vehicle (AAV). The battalion is part of the 1st Marine Division and the I Marine Expeditionary Force. The unit is based in Camp Pendleton in California.

== Mission ==
Land the surface assault element of the landing force and their equipment in a single lift from assault shipping during amphibious operations to inland objectives; to conduct mechanized operations and related combat support in subsequent operations ashore. The specific Mission Essential Tasks List (METL) includes:

- Preparing combat ready units for deployment and operations in support of the 1st Marine Division
- Preparing combat ready units for deployment and operations in support of Maritime Pre-Positioned Forces (MPF) to any AOR as directed.
- Providing sustained amphibious and ground mechanized support to the assault elements of the 1st Marine Division as well as other combat support as directed during subsequent operations ashore.
- Providing support to the 1st Combat Engineer Battalion and other 1st Marine Division units in the clearing of lanes through minefields and other obstacles during amphibious operations and in support of subsequent operations ashore.
- Preparing combat ready units for deployment with designated Marine Expeditionary Units (MEU) and deployment to Okinawa as part of the Unit Deployment Program (UDP) in support of 3rd Marine Division

== Subordinate units ==
The 3rd Assault Amphibian Battalion is currently composed of a Headquarters and Service Company, 3 companies located at Camp Pendleton, and three retired companies, one of which being the reinforced company located at the Marine Corps Air Ground Combat Center Twentynine Palms.

Name	Location
Alpha Company	Camp Pendleton
Bravo Company	Camp Pendleton
Charlie Company	Camp Pendleton
Delta Company (REIN) (retired 2021)	Marine Corps Air Ground Combat Center Twentynine Palms
Echo Company(retired 2015)	Camp Pendleton
Fox Company(retired 2012)	Camp Pendleton
Headquarters & Services Company	Camp Pendleton

== History ==
=== World War II ===
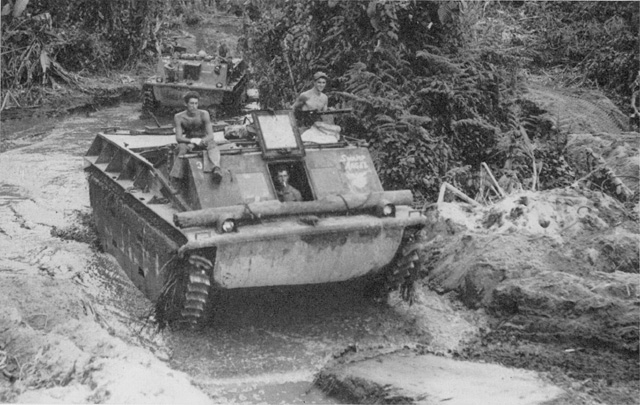
"Swamp Angel" - LVT-1 from 3rd Amtrac Bn in Bougainville

3rd Assault Amphibian Battalion was originally activated 16 September 1942 at San Diego, California, as 3rd Amphibian Tractor (Amtrac) Battalion and assigned to the 3rd Marine Division. During December 1942 the battalion relocated from San Diego a short distance up the coast to Camp Pendleton. After training for a few months the battalion then deployed in February–March 1943 to Auckland, New Zealand in preparation for combat in the Pacific theater.

During World War II, the battalion was primarily armed with Landing Vehicle Tracked (LVT), specifically the LVT-2 also known as "WATER BUFFALOS".

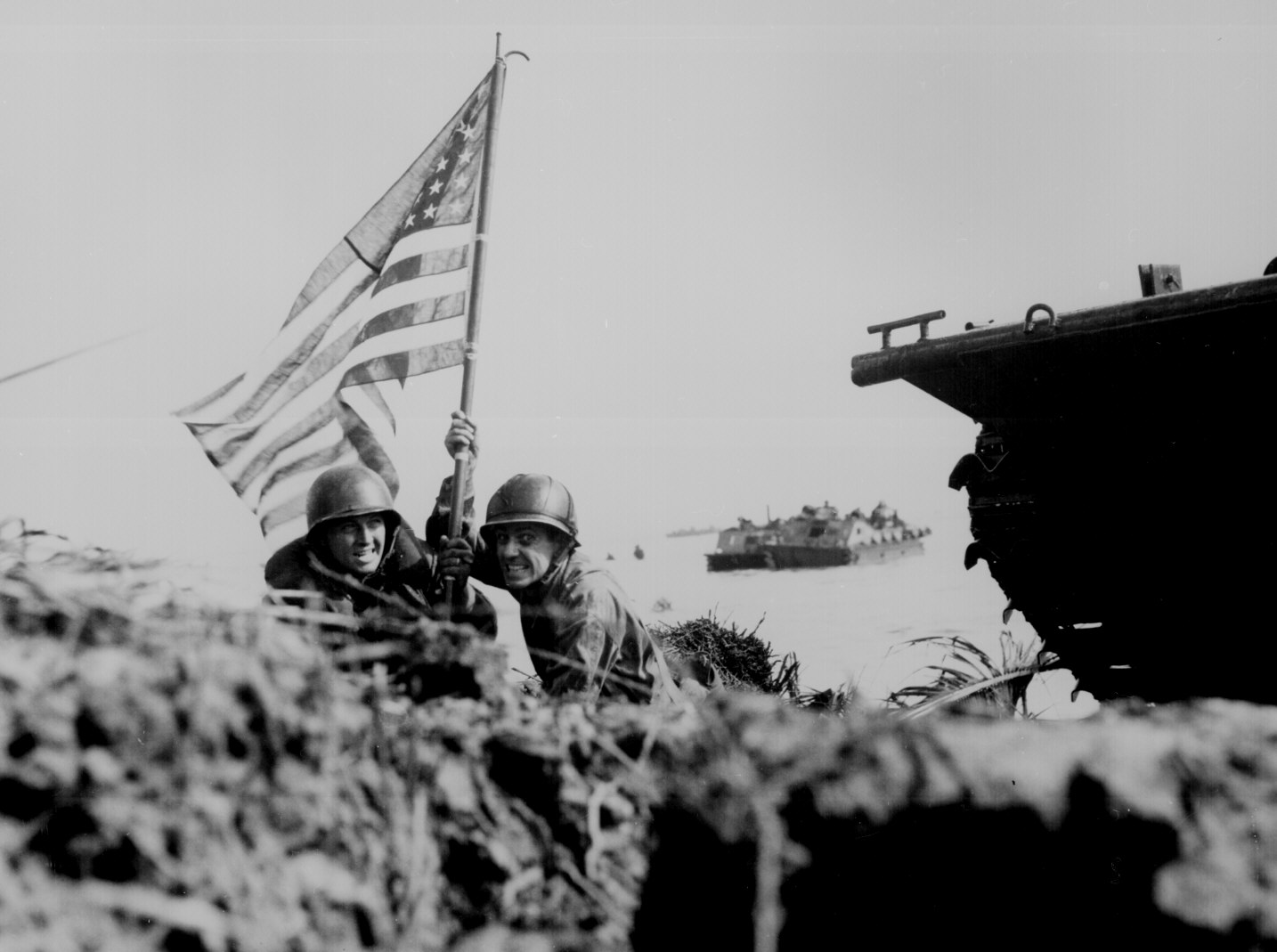
First flag on Guam on boat hook mast. Two U.S. officers plant the American flag on Guam July 20, 1944.

The battalion fought in the following combat actions:

- Bougainville with 124 LVT-1s
- Guam with 193 LVT-2s and LVT-4s
- Iwo Jima with 90 LVT-2s
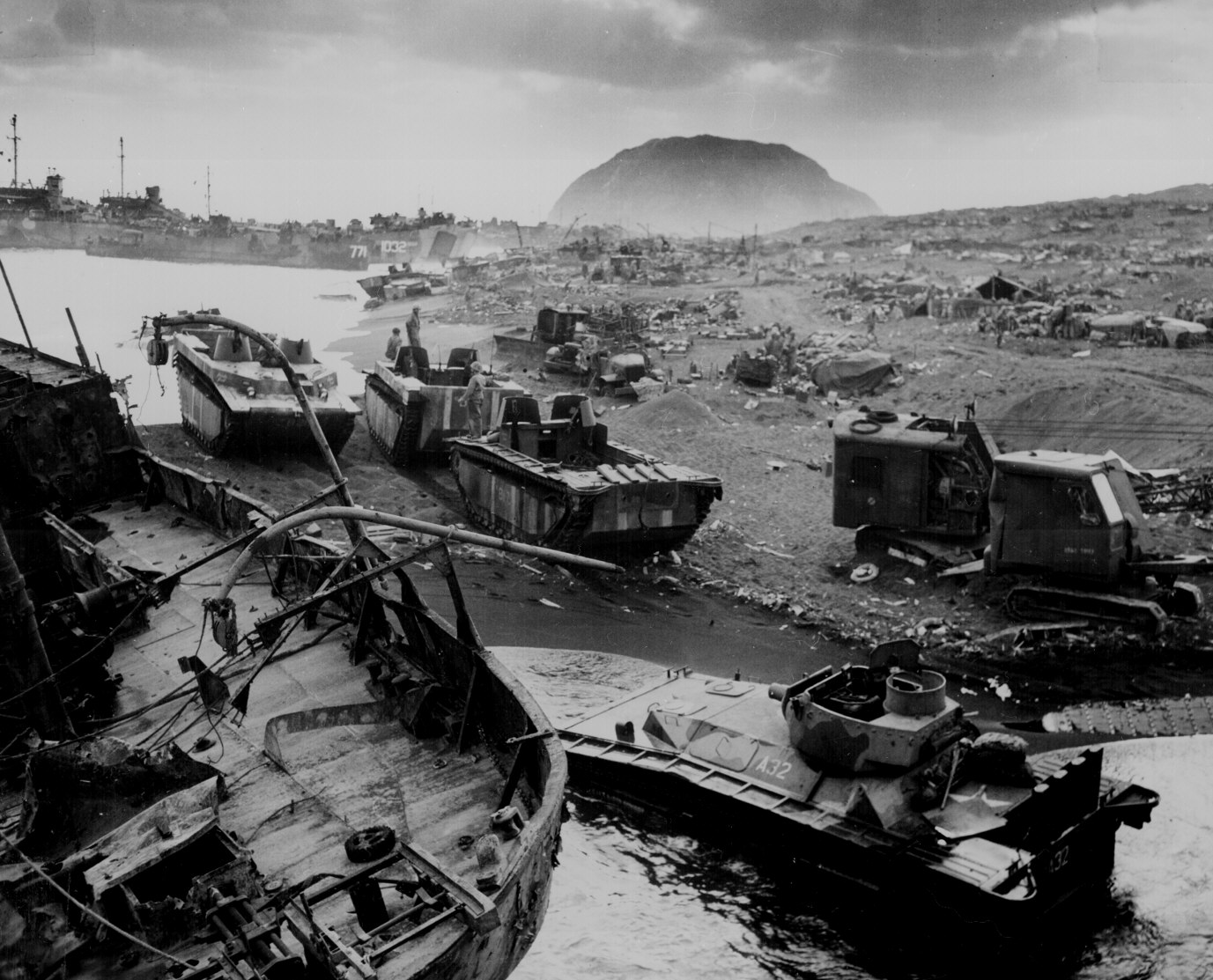
  Smashed by Japanese mortar and shellfire, trapped by Iwo's treacherous black-ash sands, amtracs and other vehicles of war lay knocked out.

For its actions in World War II, 3rd Amphibian Tractor Battalion was awarded the Presidential Unit Citation Streamer, Asiatic-Pacific Campaign Medal Streamer With Four Bronze Stars, and the World War II Victory Medal Streamer.

At the conclusion of World War II the battalion redeployed in March 1945 to Maui, territory of Hawaii and then relocated during February 1946 back to Camp Pendleton, California. It was deactivated several months later on 1 May 1946.

=== 1952 - 1966 ===
3rd Amphibian Tractor Battalion was reactivated 1 April 1952 at Camp Pendleton, California, and assigned to Fleet Marine Force, Pacific. It was subsequently reassigned during October 1955 to the 1st Marine Division. Elements participated in the Cuban Missile Crisis, October–December 1962

During this period the battalion was still armed with LVTs - transitioning primarily to the LVT-5 in the late 1950s.

=== Vietnam War and 1970s ===
3rd Amphibian Tractor Battalion deployed during February 1965 to Camp Schwab, Okinawa and redeployed again in June 1965 to the Republic of Vietnam. There the battalion fought in the Vietnam War from June 1966 - January 1970. During this conflict the battalion distinguished itself at:

- Chu Lai
- Da Nang
- An Hoa
- Hoi An

Throughout Vietnam the battalion was armed with variants of the LVT-5.

For its actions in Vietnam, 3rd Amtrac Battalion was awarded the Presidential Unit Citation Streamer, Navy Meritorious Unit Commendation Streamer, National Defense Service Medal Streamer, Vietnam Service Medal Streamer With Two Silver Stars, Vietnam Gallantry Cross with Palm Streamer, and the Vietnam Civil Actions Medal Unit Citation Streamer.

The battalion relocated during February 1970 to Camp Pendleton, California, and was reassigned to the 5th Marine Expeditionary Brigade. It was again reassigned in August 1970 to the 5th Marine Amphibious Brigade. Subsequently, in April 1971 the battalion was reassigned to the 1st Marine Division with whom it remains to this day.

In the early 1970s the battalion transitioned from the LVT-5 to its replacement the LVT-7.

On 30 December 1976 the battalion was re-designated from 3rd Amphibian Tractor Battalion to 3rd Assault Amphibian Battalion (written as 3rd AABn). The battalion participated in numerous training exercises throughout the remainder of the 1970s.

=== 1980s ===
Throughout the 1980s, 3rd Assault Amphibian Battalion deployed companies on its regular schedule of six month deployments to the forward units in Hawaii and Okinawa, including units aboard amphibious troop ships for fast-reaction forces in the Pacific and Indian Oceans and into the Persian Gulf. It shared personnel and vehicles with the 1st Armored Assault Battalion as part of the Unit Deployment Program.

In the early 1980s the battalion's LVT-7s underwent a Service Life Extension Program (SLEP), which converted the LVT-7 vehicles to the improved Amphibious Assault Vehicle-7A1 (AAV-7A1) by adding an improved engine, transmission, and weapons system and improving the overall maintainability of the vehicle. Upon realizing the need to mechanize units participating in the Combined Arms Exercises (CAX), two platoons of AAVs were transferred to the Marine Corps Air Ground Combat Center Twentynine Palms (MCAGCC) in July 1979. Of the two platoons formed from Camp Pendleton, one went to Company A, 3d Tank Battalion, and the other platoon went to Company B, 3d Tank Battalion.

The two platoons later merged and became Company D, 3rd Tank Battalion in September 1980. Two additional platoons from 3d Assault Amphibian Battalion in Hawaii arrived on board the MCAGCC in December 1981. A redesignation ceremony was held on 18 January 1982 in which the colors of Company D, 3rd Tank Battalion were formally retired and replaced with the new colors of Company D (Rein), 3d Assault Amphibian Battalion. The company was instrumental in training Marines in desert warfare as they rotated in and out of the live-fire desert training area, a key to the Marine Corp's success in the 1991 Gulf War.

For its superior performance from 1983 to 1985, the battalion was awarded a Navy Meritorious Unit Commendation.

=== Desert Shield/Storm ===
In August 1990, 3rd AABn received orders to prepare for an overseas deployment to Southwest Asia as a response to the Iraqi invasion of Kuwait. In the following month the unit deployed to Saudi Arabia and received shipments of its Amphibious Assault Vehicles from Maritime Prepositioning ships to augment its current vehicle ranks.

During this time the battalion began upgrading its AAVP-7A1s to carry the UGWS (UpGunned Weapons Station), which mounts a .50 cal (12.7 mm) M2HB machine gun and a Mk-19 40 mm grenade launcher.

In preparation for the assault into Kuwait, the battalion divided into two main mechanized infantry task forces, along with 1st and 3rd Tank Battalions, to form Task Force Ripper and Task Force Papa Bear respectively. The units trained and patrolled the Saudi frontier with Kuwait until the start of the ground war in February 1991.

After five days of combat the two task forces, along with other Marine task forces, British and Pan-Arab units, captured Kuwait International Airport and a cease-fire was announced. During the march to Kuwait City, the mechanized infantry task forces were responsible for the defeat of numerous Iraqi regiments, the capture of tens of thousands of Iraqi prisoners, and the capture or destruction of thousands of enemy armored vehicles. 3rd AABn returned to Camp Pendleton in March 1991.

For its actions during the Gulf War, the battalion was awarded a { Presidential Unit Citation } Streamer.Navy Unit Commendation Streamer, National Defense Service Medal Streamer, and the Southwest Asia Service Medal Streamer With Two Bronze Stars.

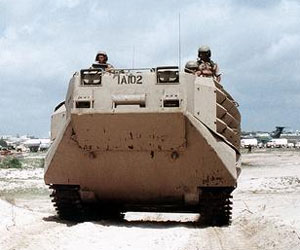
AAVP7-A1 from 3rd AABn maneuvers near Mogadishu Intl Airport, December 1992.

=== Restore Hope ===
On 9 December 1992, elements of 3rd AABn attached to the 15th MEU landed on the beach just outside the Mogadishu International Airport in Somalia in support of Operation Restore Hope. These initial forces were soon followed by Bravo, Delta, and H&S Companies of 3rd AABn. These units' operations stretched from Mogadishu to Bardera, Baidoa, and Kismayo. The battalion served as a blocking force for the International Airport's reception of airlifted humanitarian supplies, then extended its services as road guards for supply convoys and foot patrols in and around Mogadishu.

Elements of 3rd AABn served in Somalia or off the coast aboard MEUs from 1992 until approximately 1995. For its actions during Operation Restore Hope, the battalion was awarded the Joint Meritorious Unit Award Streamer and the Armed Forces Expeditionary Medal Streamer.

=== Global War on Terror ===
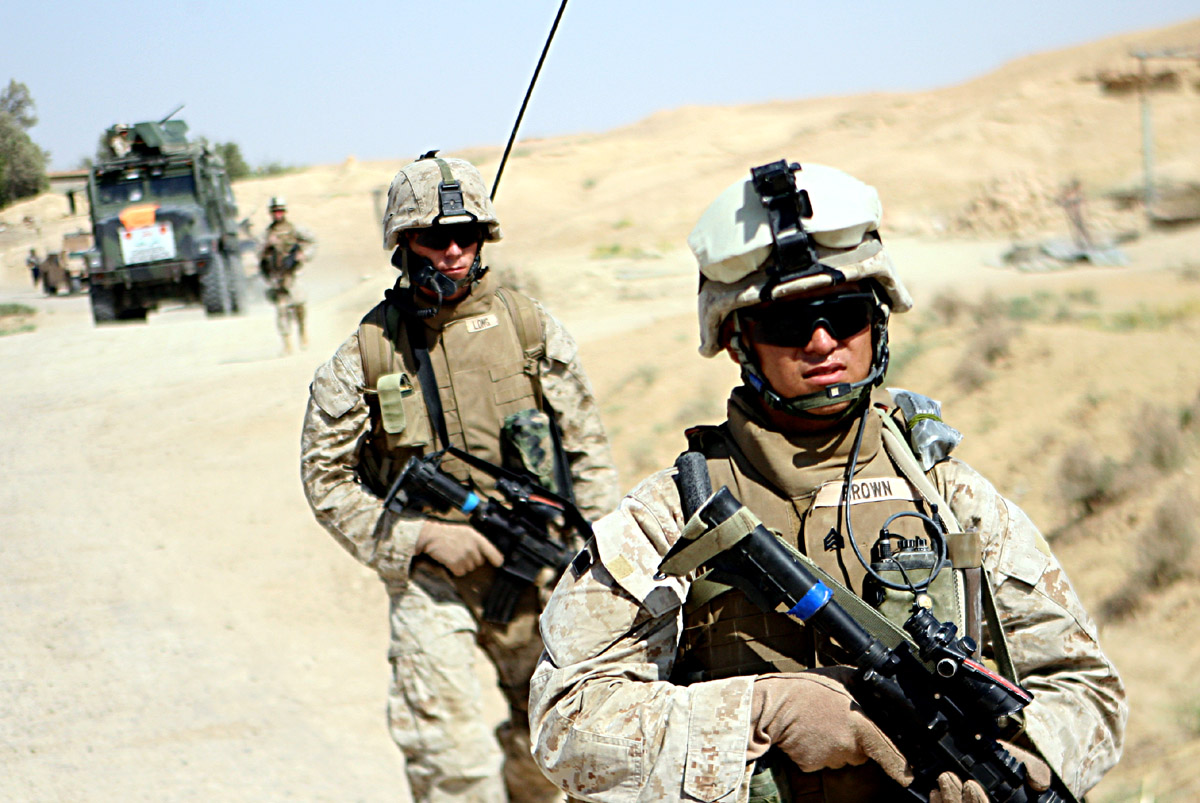
3rd AABn Marines conduct a motorized patrol of Dulab, Iraq, July 17, 2006.

In 2003, 3rd AABn participated in Operation Iraqi Freedom as part of the 1st Marine Division. They first deployed in February 2003 to Kuwait and crossed the border into Iraq in March, attacking all the way to Baghdad. The battalion served as the primary mechanized assault support for the infantry and proved to be an invaluable asset in crossing the vast distances and urban areas of Iraq. Companies from 3rd AABn continue to deploy to Iraq on a regular basis in support of Multi-National Forces West (MNF-W). In the Al Anbar province they conduct all manner of operations ranging from traditional infantry mechanized assault support to acting independently as motorized forces patrolling vast urban and desert areas.

In 2010, the battalion was deployed to Helmand Province, Afghanistan. During that deployment the battalion suffered a casualty; Corporal Julio Vargas, who was killed by an IED on July 20.

== Awards ==
To date, the battalion's actions in support of the Global War on Terror have earned it a Presidential Unit Citation Streamer, Navy Meritorious Unit Commendation Streamer, National Defense Service Medal Streamer, Global War on Terrorism Expeditionary Medal Streamer, and the Global War on Terrorism Service Medal Streamer.

== Notable former members ==
- Justin LeHew - One of the most highly decorated US Servicemen serving in the war on terror. Recipient of the Navy Cross for action during the Battle of Nasiriyah in 2003. Recipient of the Bronze Star Medal with combat "V" for actions during the battle of Najaf 2004.

== Unit honors ==
3rd Assault Amphibian Battalion's unit awards include:

Presidential Unit Citation Streamer With Three Bronze Stars

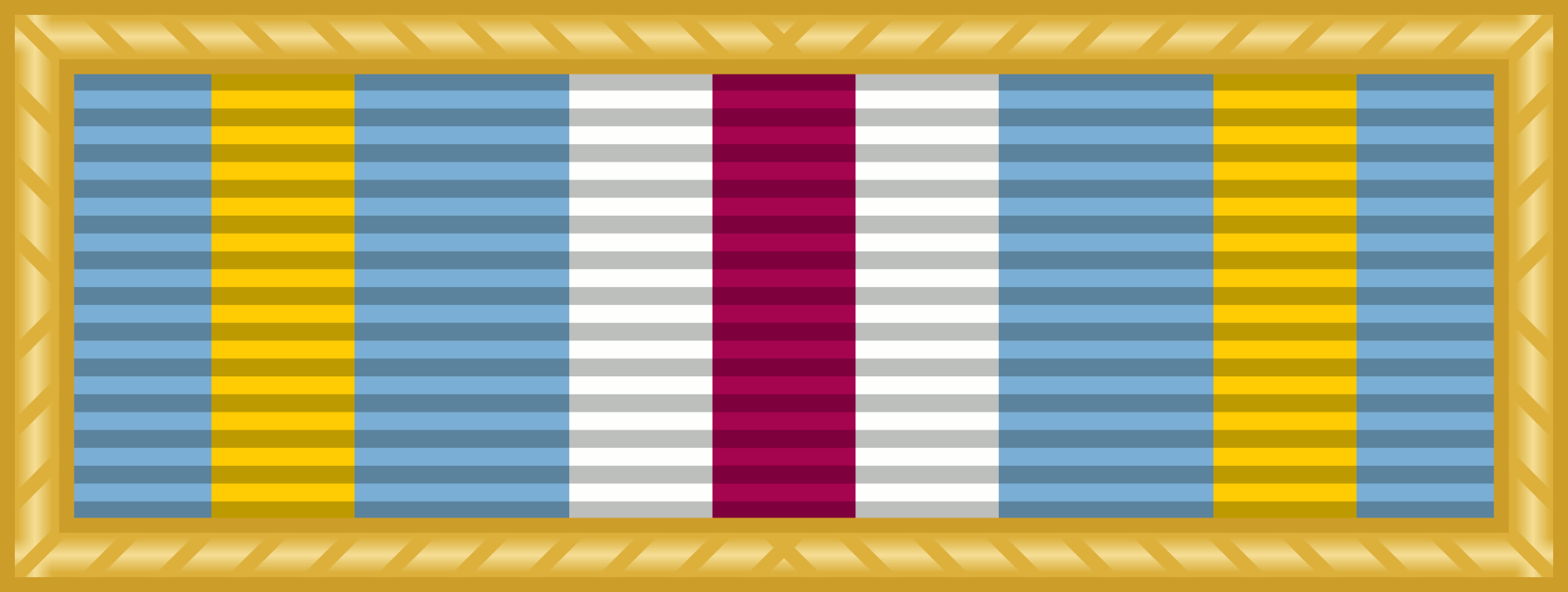
Joint Meritorious Unit Award Steamer

Navy Unit Commendation Streamer

Navy Meritorious Unit Commendation Streamer With Two Bronze Stars

Asiatic-Pacific Campaign Medal Streamer With Four Bronze Stars

World War II Victory Medal Streamer

National Defense Service Medal Streamer With Two Bronze Stars

Armed Forces Expeditionary Medal Streamer

Vietnam Service Medal Streamer With Two Silver Stars

Southwest Asia Service Medal Streamer With Two Bronze Stars

Global War on Terrorism Expeditionary Medal Streamer

Global War on Terrorism Service Medal Streamer

Vietnam Gallantry Cross Unit Citation with Palm Streamer

Vietnam Civil Actions Medal Unit Citation Streamer

== See also ==
- List of United States Marine Corps battalions
- WWII/Korea LVT Museum
- Organization of the United States Marine Corps
