= Communications Platoon =

In the USMC, a communications platoon, also known as the "S-6", is responsible for all related communications for the battalion. It is part of the Headquarters and Services Company and is responsible for supporting all companies within the battalion. At the regiment level, the communications platoon is responsible for providing support to the regiment as well as the battalion communication platoons. Within the communications platoon, there are four sections: Data, Wire, Radio, and Maintenance. Each of these sections have specialized individuals who have been trained to best understand their field.

== Leadership ==
The communications platoon is headed by a 2nd or 1st lieutenant, called the communications officer or S-6, and a master sergeant, called the communications chief. For regiment level communication platoons, it is typical to have a captain head the platoon and a master gunnery sergeant be the senior enlisted marine. Each section has a chief that is responsible for the work of the section. The rank of the section chief can vary from sergeant to master sergeant; however, to have a data chief, radio chief, wire chief, or maintenance chief MOS, the marine must be a staff non-commissioned officer (NCO).

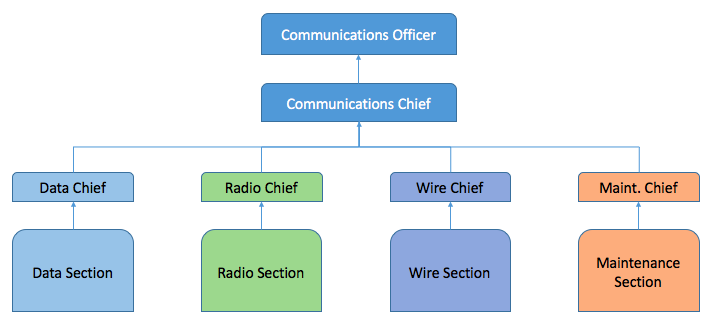
Organizational structure of the USMC Communications Platoon

== Data section ==
Key objectives of the data section are to develop and prepare networks during field operations, maintain the network at the base, and provide helpdesk support. The data section is responsible for all computer related issues for the battalion, to include email, office support, servers, switches, routers, and printers. During preparation of field ops, the data section will configure routers and switches to create a LAN at the base of the field op. Additionally, the data section will prepare all laptops that will be used and the servers to support them (e.g. exchange servers, ESXi hosts, etc.).

== Radio section ==
Within the communications platoon, a section of 15 to 30 Radio operators provide Command and Control (C2) for the commanders and subordinate units. This ultimately leads to clear and concise information passage between units by way of two way radio communication. During operational situations such as field training exercises and deployments, the establishment and operation of radio networks is accomplished. A typical radio network has a central hub located at the battalions Combat Operations Center. For purposes of anti radio direction finding, all radio systems and antennas are remotely moved away from the battalion Combat Operations Center, leaving only the operators with an interface behind. This central hub allows exterior units to communicate with battalion assets. With this system established Indirect Fire Agencies, casualty evacuation, resupply and many other vital services can be accomplished. Enabling systems include satellite communications systems and high frequency radios for long range communication, ultra high frequency radios for air communication and very high frequency radios for tactical ground communication. Additionally, networks can have further extended ranges by establishing a repeater site known as a retransmission site. This allows a larger sphere of influence for the battalion commander and his staff and subordinate commanders.
