= Mobile assault platoon =

Type of platoon in the US Marine Corps

A mobile assault platoon, also called MAP platoon or MAP, is a unit structure concept used in the U.S. Marine Corps infantry. It is part of the wider mobile assault company concept, itself an element of a marine infantry battalion. MACs are designed to replace a conventional weapons company, being more mobile and thus more usable in mid- and high-intensity conflicts (MIC-HIC).

== History ==
The units were introduced in the mid-1990s, based on the Marine Corps' combined anti-armor team (CAAT), and its critical use in Operation Desert Storm. The MAC furthered the CAAT structure to encompass a whole infantry company. The first MAC was with 2nd Battalion, 7th Marines.

== Structure ==
Mobile assault platoons are part of mobile assault companies, which are designed to replace the current weapons company structure of a marine infantry battalion. In this scheme, the weapons company becomes a fourth infantry maneuver element, in conjunction with the battalion's three rifle companies. The weapons company's combined anti-armor team or combined arms assault team, mortar platoons, and heavy machine gun platoons are reorganized to provide the manpower of an MAC.

Of the weapons company's weapon systems, the BGM-71 TOW, M2 machine gun, and the Mk 19 grenade launcher can be mounted on vehicle turrets. However, mortars cannot be fired from a Humvee or MRAP.

MAPs are mounted units, using wheeled vehicles such as Humvees and MRAPs for movement rather than conducting foot patrols. However, dismounted infantry scouts can also be employed to protect vehicles.

While they are used in combat operations, the MAP and MAC are not officially designated in the Marine Corps table of organization and equipment (TO&E).

== Use ==
Mobile assault platoons have been employed in combat operations during Operation Iraqi Freedom (OIF) in Iraq and Operation Enduring Freedom (OEF) in Afghanistan.

Mobile assault platoons were used as mobile crew-served weapons platforms during both OIF and OEF.

== See also ==
- Military transition team
