= Combined anti-armor team =

Type of military unit

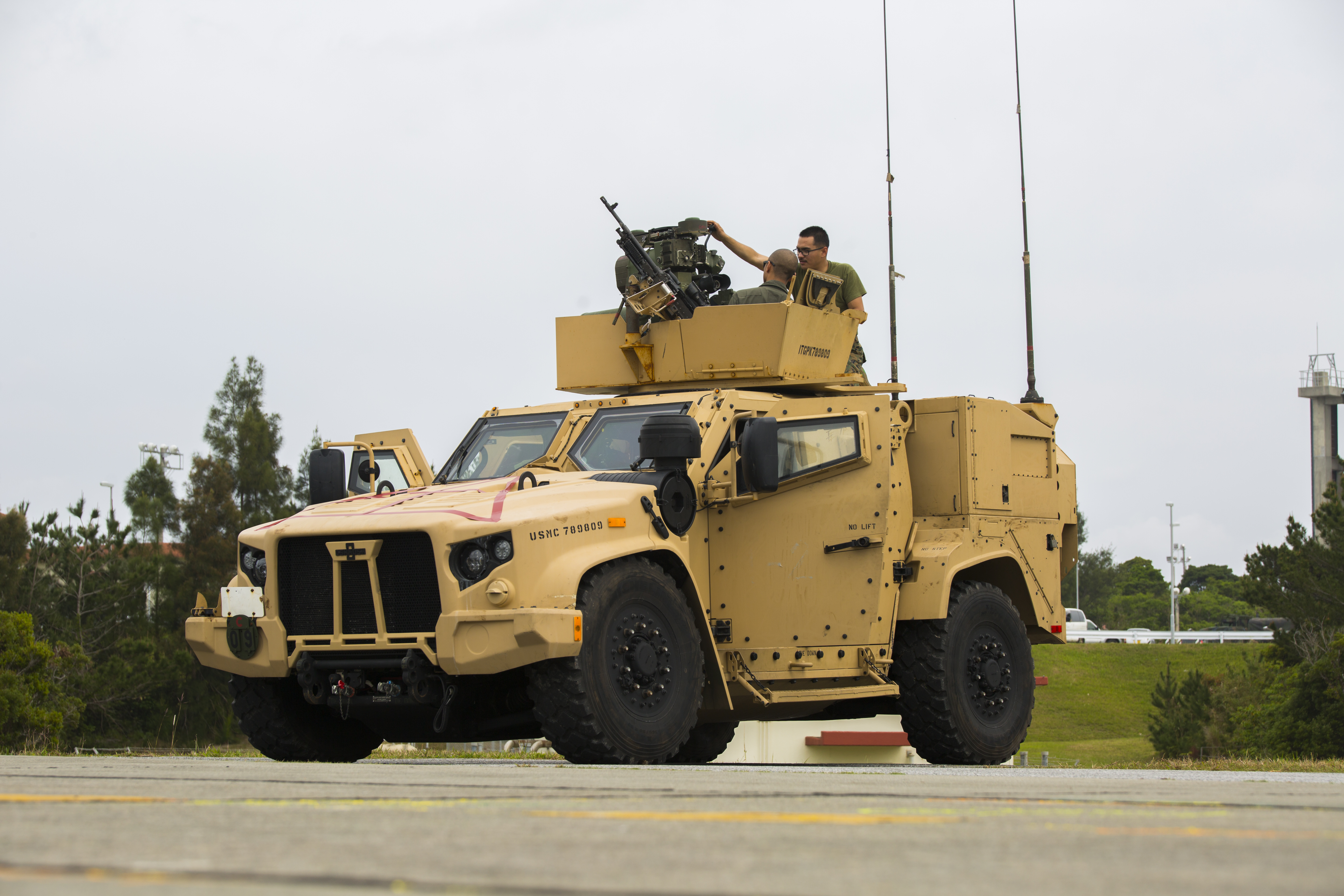
Combined Anti-Armor Team, Battalion Landing Team, 1st Battalion, 5th Marines, 31st Marine Expeditionary Unit, demonstrate the capabilities of a Joint Light Tactical Vehicle. Okinawa (March 28, 2020)

A combined anti-armor team or combined arms assault team (CAAT) is an organization of a United States Marine Corps weapons company where one or more platoons are operated in a detached role to conduct reconnaissance missions and combat ground armored vehicles and air defense vehicles with heavy weapons systems. CAATs often use weapon systems such as M2 .50 caliber machine guns, Mk-19 grenade launchers, and anti-armor missile systems such as BGM-71 TOW missiles and FGM-148 Javelins.

In the Marine Corps, members of a CAAT are typically weapons company infantrymen, who receive additional training in the CAAT role as well as cross-training in all of the weapons systems employed by the CAAT.

In addition to their usual role of dedicated anti-armor operations, CAATs are a vehicle-mounted heavy weapons quick reaction force for the infantry units they support. CAATs may also serve as security elements for a variety of military elements.

== Personnel ==
A USMC CAAT is composed of machine gunners and anti-tank missile gunners pulled from the marine weapons company anti-armor platoon and heavy machine gun platoon. These are led by infantry squad leaders, who in turn are led by infantry unit leaders and infantry weapons officers.

== Basic operations against armored vehicles ==
In its most basic role, a CAAT platoon and its various sections and teams will engage armored vehicles at standoff ranges, where the enemy will be unable to effectively engage the CAAT forces. Due to their highly mobile, but lightly armored nature, the CAAT will employ ambush tactics or flanking maneuvers to engage the enemy from unexpected directions. Heavily armored vehicles such as main battle tanks will be engaged by the anti-armor missile sections, while lighter threats such as armored personnel carriers will be engaged by the machine-gun or grenade launcher sections. The machine-gun and grenade launcher sections also act as protection against enemy infantry, which anti-armor sections are very weak against.

== Reconnaissance missions ==
CAATs are often used by battalion commanders as reconnaissance platoons. This is due in part to the armor threat with the fight against ISIS being non-existent. These missions are allowed due to these teams being so mobile, along with the extensive training each member of a CAAT is cross trained in, along with the capability of members of a CAAT platoon having special training pertaining to mission specific requirements.

CAAT members are also extensively trained in military operations on urban terrain, (MOUT) close quarters battle, (CQB) and multiple small arms operations.

=== Additional missions ===
According to "Machine Guns and Machine Gun Gunnery"; in the defense, CAAT could be assigned such missions as "...conducting anti-armor ambushes forward of the forward edge of the battle area (FEBA), supporting a combat outpost, or reinforcing a counter attack force". (MCWP 3-15.1 6-8) In the offense, CAAT "...can act as a motorized scout element that seeks to find and maintain contact with the enemy while the unit’s main body maneuvers to engage, or they can conduct route reconnaissance and provide reports about the trafficability of a unit’s planned route of march". (MCWP 3-15.1 6-8)

== Organization of a CAAT platoon ==
A CAAT is not a formal unit, but an ad-hoc organization of the existing weapons company. As such, it has no formal table of organization and equipment (TOE), and no set size or precisely defined organization. It typically makes use of the weapons company section format, with each section being dedicated to a single weapons system. Operationally, the sections are broken up and organized into teams, with each team composed of two to four vehicles equipped with a combination of weapons systems, usually a single anti-armor missile system and one or two machine guns or automatic grenade launchers. A vehicle is led by an NCO, with a team being led by either an NCO, SNCO, or officer depending on the exact organization.

There are many roles in the CAAT. listed below are some of the most common roles of each member in the CAAT.

- Vehicle commander (VC) - The vehicle commander makes all decisions regarding the vehicle and its inhabitants. The VC will usually be on the radio (or other communications device, i.e., laptop) and communicate directly with other vehicles. Exceptions to this rule are officers who usually have another marine use the radio.
- Driver - The driver not only drives the vehicle, but is responsible for its entire upkeep and maintenance. The driver coordinates with the motor pool and its marines to ensure timely repairs and maintenance. In addition, during ship-borne deployment, the driver is responsible whenever the vehicle must be moved. During missions, the driver takes cues from the VC as to where to go and how to get there.
- Gunner - The gunner maintains and operates the gun, and also provides a view to the VC from atop the vehicle. The gunner is quite visible in the turret of the vehicle, and so he can also be a communicator to any people outside the vehicle.
- Corpsman - The platoon's corpsman is a U.S. Navy hospital corpsman with additional field medical training. The corpsman takes a full part in operations with the rest of the team, but also provides medical assistance and coverage when necessary.
- Dismount - The dismount is responsible for anything that needs to be done outside of the vehicle, such as obtaining visual information that is not possible from the vehicle's point of view. This billet may be combined with any of the other billets, except usually not for the VC or the driver.
- Ammo man - The ammo man is another combined billet. When the gunner is using the gun, someone may be responsible for taking old ammo and providing the gunner with live ammo (missiles or rounds). This improves the rate of fire of the weapons system.

== See also ==
- Mobile assault platoon
