= Headquarters and service company =

US Marine unit

A headquarters and service company is a company-sized military unit, found at the battalion and regimental level in the U.S. Marine Corps. The U.S. Army equivalent unit is the headquarters and headquarters company.

In identifying a specific headquarters unit, it is usually referred to by its abbreviation as H&S company or HSC. While a line company is formed of three or four platoons, a headquarters and service company is made up of the battalion headquarters, which includes the battalion or regimental command section and the battalion/regimental headquarters executive staff, and headquarters support personnel of a battalion, or regiment. As these personnel do not fall inside one of the line companies of the battalion or regiment, the H&S company is the unit to which they are administratively assigned. The typical personnel strength of an average H&S company for a Marine infantry battalion is 269 personnel. A headquarters and service battery is found in most Marine units.

== Battalion headquarters ==
Inside a typical battalion H&S company, the battalion headquarters command section (CO, XO, and SgtMaj) and the battalion headquarters executive staff will usually include the following key personnel and primary staff officers:

- a battalion commander, usually a lieutenant colonel
- a battalion executive officer, usually a major
- a battalion sergeant major, (the senior enlisted advisor to the battalion commander on enlisted personnel matters, especially those involving discipline and morale).
- a manpower officer (administration and personnel) with the title of "adjutant" (S1), usually a first or second lieutenant
- an intelligence and counterintelligence officer (S2), usually a captain
- an operations and training officer (S3), usually a major
- a logistics officer (S4), usually a captain
- a communications and information officer (S6), usually a first or second lieutenant

Most of the executive staff sections (the "S" sections) contain at least one additional officer (S-1 & S-2) or up to several additional officers (S-3 has seven and S-4 has three) who serve as assistant staff officers or as functional managers within the staff section. An infantry battalion has one Navy Chaplain Corps officer (chaplain), with their Religious Program Specialist, and two Navy Medical Corps officers (surgeons), collectively referred to as the "special staff," as well as essential Navy and Marine Corps staff non-commissioned officers (SNCOs), chief petty officers (CPOs), non-commissioned officers, petty officers, and junior enlisted Marines and Navy hospital corpsmen who serve as support personnel in the occupational specialities of the executive staff sections (S1 through S4 and the S6) and special staff sections (chaplain and medical).

== Battalion H&S company ==
The H&S company is commanded by a company commander (usually a captain) who is supported by a company executive officer (usually a first lieutenant), a company first sergeant, and a company gunnery sergeant. All personnel in H&S fall under the administrative command of the H&S company commander (dual-hatted as the "headquarters commandant") who is responsible for managing the physical support of the battalion headquarters including security, billeting, messing, facilities, and utilities. In practice, the battalion executive officer and sergeant major, as well as the primary and special staff officers, report directly to the battalion commander. While the battalion commander is administratively assigned to H&S, he or she is the H&S company commander's immediate higher commander and thus the H&S company commander operationally answers directly to the battalion commander.

The mission of the H&S company commander is to run the administrative and Marine training aspects of H&S, and to support the battalion primary staff by facilitating the environment in which they operate and in turn support the battalion commander in commanding the battalion. To perform this service and support mission, the H&S company of an infantry battalion contains additional personnel assigned to support and sustain the mission of the battalion headquarters and provide general support services to the entire battalion. These personnel are organized into a scout sniper platoon (organic to the S-2/Intelligence section, commanded by the assistant intelligence officer), a communications platoon (commanded by the S-6), a service platoon (including supply, armory, motor transport, TOW anti-tank missile system maintenance, and dining facility sections, with the battalion supply officer as the service platoon commander), and a Battalion Aid Station consisting entirely of Navy personnel and commanded by the senior ranking officer of the battalion's two surgeons).

== Regimental headquarters company ==
At the regimental level, the headquarters company is significantly smaller, having an authorized strength of only 182 members. The reason for the smaller manpower is that the regimental H&S Company does not have subordinate companies to support as does the battalion H&S. Therefore, its S-1 section and service platoon are significantly smaller, and there is no medical platoon, as it is only supporting the regimental headquarters company rather than an entire infantry battalion consisting of several companies and almost 1,000 members. Also, there is no scout sniper platoon in the regimental H&S Company, making the S-2 section smaller, further reducing manpower totals. (When task organized into a Regimental Combat Team as part of a MAGTF, the regiment is usually supported by an attached reconnaissance company from the regiment's parent Marine Division's reconnaissance battalion, as well as by other ground combat support assets allocated from its parent MARDIV.)

While the company commander of a regimental H&S company remains as a captain, the ranks of many of the staff and support personnel are typically higher than those found at the battalion level to reflect the greater degree of responsibility and authority resident in a higher echelon of command. The S-3 and S-4 sections are slightly larger (perhaps reflecting the greater responsibility for planning and supervising current and future operations inherent in these staff sections) and there is a somewhat larger communications platoon (largely due to significantly greater allocation of manpower in the regimental communications center as compared to the battalion's message center).

== Headquarters battery (field artillery) and headquarters and service battery (LAADBn) ==
In keeping with the long-standing practice of referring to company-sized artillery units as "batteries" the headquarters company equivalent element of an artillery battalion or regiment, or a low altitude air defense battalion, is referred to as a headquarters battery (field artillery) or a headquarters and service battery (-) (LAAD) / headquarters and service battery detachment.

Each Marine artillery battalion has a 199-member battalion headquarters battery that contains the battalion headquarters, an operations platoon, a service platoon, a communications platoon, and the battery headquarters (T/O 1142G). A Marine artillery regiment has a 380-member regimental headquarters battery consisting of the regimental headquarters, an operations platoon, a communications platoon, the battery headquarters, an artillery electronic maintenance section, an engineer equipment platoon, a motor transport section, a medical section, and a counter battery radar/ Target Acquisition platoon (T/O 1101H).

Additionally, some headquarters elements for certain units, particularly MAGTFs or Marine Aviation units, are not officially designated as a "company" and are sometimes informally referred to as "detachments." as a result, these units are usually referred to as headquarters and service, or headquarters detachments.

== Headquarters battalion, Marine division ==
A Marine division has instead a headquarters (HQ) battalion commanded by a colonel. The HQ battalion consists of the division headquarters command and general staff ("G" sections), battalion headquarters command and executive staff ("S" sections), a headquarters company (including the division band), a communications company and a truck company.

== See also ==
- Units, formations, and commands
- Staff (military)
- Headquarters and Headquarters Company
