= Combat service support (United States) =

United States military logistics aspect

Combat service support is a topic that is, broadly speaking, a subset of military logistics. However, combat service support is often more limited in depth, as the related groups primarily address factors supporting readiness for combat operations. The United States Department of Defense organizes various agencies providing services such as medical assistance, for example, akin to other nations' militaries.

== United States Army ==
In the United States Army, the term combat service support was until 2008 defined as the essential capabilities, functions, activities, and tasks necessary to sustain all elements of operating forces in theater at all levels of war. Within the national and theater logistics systems, it includes but is not limited to that support rendered by service forces in ensuring the aspects of materiel and supply chain management, maintenance, transportation, health services, and other services required by aviation and ground combat troops to permit those units to accomplish their missions in combat. Combat service support encompasses those activities at all levels of war that produce sustainment to all operating forces on the battlefield. Within the United States Army, the traditional combat service support branches are the following:

Basic branches

- Acquisition Corps
- Adjutant General's Corps
- Finance Corps
- Logistics Corps
- Ordnance Corps
- Quartermaster Corps
- Transportation Corps

Special branches

- Army Medical Department (AMEDD)
  - Dental Corps
  - Medical Corps
  - Medical Service Corps
  - Medical Specialist Corps
  - Nurse Corps
  - Veterinary Corps
- Chaplain Corps
- Judge Advocate General's Corps

=== Replaced by sustainment ===
"Combat service support" as a classification was replaced by "sustainment" with the publication of FM 3–0, Operations, in February 2008. In the US Army Sustainment is defined as "the provision of logistics, personnel services, and health service support necessary to maintain operations until successful mission completion". Sustainment is one of the six warfighting functions, which also include movement and maneuver, intelligence, fires, command and control, and protection.

== United States Marine Corps ==
In the United States Marine Corps, combat service support has a similar definition to that of the United States Army. The Marine Corps Logistics Command (MARCORLOGCOM) is the preferred provider of supply chain management, collaborative maintenance management and strategic prepositioning to the operating forces of the United States Marine Corps and other services and agencies.

The Logistics Combat Element (LCE), formerly Combat Service Support Element (CSSE) is the portion of the Marine Air-Ground Task Force (MAGTF) responsible for providing logistical support. The LCE provides all support functions not organic to the ground combat element (GCE) and aviation combat element (ACE) units of the MAGTF. Functions include: heavy engineer support, motor transport, supply, maintenance, medical, dental, and specialized support such as air delivery, Explosive Ordnance Disposal (EOD), and landing support.

=== Logistics groups ===
There are four logistics groups in the United States Marine Corps:

- 1st Marine Logistics Group, based at Marine Corps Base Camp Pendleton, California, provides tactical logistics support above the organic capabilities of supported elements of the I Marine Expeditionary Force (MEF) and provides task organized Logistics Combat Elements in support of MAGTF operations. Units of the 1st Marine Logistics Group include:
  - Headquarters Regiment Provides combat logistics to 1st Marine Expeditionary Brigade (MEB) and command, control and coordination of logistics services to I MEF forces. Executes Maritime Pre-positioning Force (MPF) Operations in order to achieve rapid build-up of combat power. Provides combat logistics to Marine Expeditionary Units and provides terminal operation support to deploying I MEF forces.
    - Combat Logistics Battalion 11 (provides direct, multi-function, logistics support to the 11th Marine Expeditionary Unit)
    - Combat Logistics Battalion 13 (provides direct, multi-function, logistics support to the 13th Marine Expeditionary Unit)
    - Combat Logistics Battalion 15 (provides direct, multi-function, logistics support to the 15th Marine Expeditionary Unit)
  - Combat Logistics Regiment 1 (provides direct, motor transport and landing support to the infantry regiments of the 1st Marine Division (United States)
    - Combat Logistics Battalion 1 (provides direct, motor transport and landing support to the 1st Marine Regiment (United States)
    - Combat Logistics Battalion 5 (provides direct, motor transport and landing support to the 5th Marine Regiment (United States)
    - Combat Logistics Battalion 7 (provides direct, motor transport and landing support to the 7th Marine Regiment (United States)
  - Combat Logistics Regiment 15 (provides general, non-aviation and ground equipment maintenance and supply support, to all elements of the I MEF)
    - 1st Maintenance Battalion
    - 1st Supply Battalion
    - Combat Logistics Company 11 (provides direct, non-aviation related, ground equipment maintenance and supply support to Marine Corps Air Station Miramar, California)
    - Combat Logistics Company 16 (provides direct, non-aviation related, ground equipment maintenance and supply support to Marine Corps Air Station Yuma, Arizona)
  - 1st Dental Battalion
  - 1st Medical Battalion
  - 7th Engineer Support Battalion
- 2nd Marine Logistics Group, based at Marine Corps Base Camp Lejeune, North Carolina, provides tactical logistics support above the organic capabilities of supported elements of the II Marine Expeditionary Force (MEF) and provides task organized Logistics Combat Elements in support of MAGTF operations. Units of the 2nd Marine Logistics Group include:
  - Headquarters Regiment Provides combat logistics to 2d Marine Expeditionary Brigade (MEB) and command, control and coordination of logistics services to II MEF forces. Executes Maritime Pre-positioning Force (MPF) Operations in order to achieve rapid build-up of combat power. Provides combat logistics to Marine Expeditionary Units and provides terminal operation support to deploying II MEF forces.
    - Combat Logistics Battalion 22 (provides direct, multi-function, logistics support to the 22nd Marine Expeditionary Unit)
    - Combat Logistics Battalion 24 (provides direct, multi-function, logistics support to the 24th Marine Expeditionary Unit)
    - Combat Logistics Battalion 26 (provides direct, multi-function, logistics support to the 26th Marine Expeditionary Unit)
  - Combat Logistics Regiment 2 (provides direct, motor transport and landing support to the infantry regiments of the 2nd Marine Division (United States)
    - Combat Logistics Battalion 2 (provides direct, motor transport and landing support to the 2nd Marine Regiment (United States)
    - Combat Logistics Battalion 6 (provides direct, motor transport and landing support to the 6th Marine Regiment (United States)
    - Combat Logistics Battalion 8 (provides direct, motor transport and landing support to the 8th Marine Regiment (United States)
  - Combat Logistics Regiment 25 (provides general, non-aviation and ground equipment maintenance and supply support, to all elements of the II MEF)
    - 2nd Maintenance Battalion
    - 2nd Supply Battalion
    - Combat Logistics Company 21 (provides direct, non-aviation related, ground equipment maintenance and supply support to Marine Corps Air Station Cherry Point, North Carolina)
    - Combat Logistics Company 23 (provides direct, non-aviation related, ground equipment maintenance and supply support to MCAS Beaufort, South Carolina)
  - 2nd Dental Battalion
  - 2nd Medical Battalion
  - 8th Engineer Support Battalion
- 3rd Marine Logistics Group, based at Camp Kinser, Okinawa, Japan, provides tactical logistics support above the organic capabilities of supported elements of the III Marine Expeditionary Force (MEF) and provides task organized Logistics Combat Elements in support of MAGTF operations. Units of the 3rd Marine Logistics Group include:
  - Headquarters Regiment Provides combat logistics to 3d Marine Expeditionary Brigade (MEB) and command, control and coordination of logistics services to III MEF forces. Executes Maritime Pre-positioning Force (MPF) Operations in order to achieve rapid build-up of combat power. Provides combat logistics to Marine Expeditionary Units and provides terminal operation support to deploying III MEF forces.
    - Combat Logistics Battalion 31 (provides direct, multi-function, logistics support to the 31st Marine Expeditionary Unit)
  - Combat Logistics Regiment 3 (provides direct, motor transport and landing support to the infantry regiments of the 3rd Marine Division (United States)
    - Combat Logistics Battalion 3 (provides direct, motor transport and landing support to the 3rd Marine Regiment (United States)
    - Combat Logistics Battalion 4 (provides direct, motor transport and landing support to the 4th Marine Regiment (United States)
  - Combat Logistics Regiment 35 (provides general, non-aviation and ground equipment maintenance and supply support, to all elements of the III MEF)
    - 3rd Maintenance Battalion
    - 3rd Supply Battalion
    - Combat Logistics Company 35 (provides direct, non-aviation related, ground equipment maintenance and supply support to MCAS Kaneohe Bay, HI)
    - Combat Logistics Company 36 (provides direct, non-aviation related, ground equipment maintenance and supply support to MCAS Iwakuni, Japan)
  - 3rd Dental Battalion
  - 3rd Medical Battalion
  - 9th Engineer Support Battalion
- 4th Marine Logistics Group, a reserve unit, headquartered in New Orleans, Louisiana, with units scattered throughout the United States, provides tactical logistics support above the organic capabilities of supported elements of the Marine Forces Reserve and provides task organized Logistics Combat Elements in support of 4th MARDIV and 4th MAW operations. Units of the 4th Marine Logistics Group include:
  - Headquarters and Service Battalion The Headquarters and Service battalion provides command and control, administration, communications, security, food service and data processing support to the Marine Logistics Group (MLG) and supporting services to the Marine Expeditionary Force (MEF) or two Marine Expeditionary Brigades (MEB) and MEF residual forces in expeditionary/amphibious operations and subsequent operations ashore.
  - Combat Logistics Regiment 4 (provides direct, motor transport and landing support and general maintenance and supply support, to an infantry regiment of the 4th Marine Division (United States)
    - Combat Logistics Battalion 23 (provides direct, motor transport and landing support to the 23rd Marine Regiment (United States)
    - Combat Logistics Battalion 453
  - Combat Logistics Regiment 45 (provides direct, motor transport and landing support and general maintenance and supply support, to an infantry regiment of the 4th Marine Division (United States)
    - Combat Logistics Battalion 25 (provides direct, motor transport and landing support to the 25th Marine Regiment (United States)
    - Combat Logistics Battalion 451
  - 4th Dental Battalion
  - 4th Medical Battalion
  - 6th Engineer Support Battalion

== See also ==
- Branches of the U.S. Army
- Combat Service Support
- Combat Support
- Combat arms
- U.S. Army Regimental System
- List of United States Marine Corps Combat Logistics Companies
- Principles of sustainment
- Coats of arms of U.S. Support Battalions
