= Liberation of Kuwait campaign order of battle =

Ground troop movements February 24–28, 1991 during Operation Desert Storm.

This is the order of battle for the Liberation of Kuwait campaign during the Gulf War between Coalition forces and the Iraqi Armed Forces between February 24–28, 1991. The order that they are listed in are from west to east. Iraqi units that were not in the Kuwaiti Theater of Operations are excluded from this list. Some Iraqi divisions remained un-identified by Department of Defense intelligence and a number of the details of the Iraqi order of battle are in dispute among various authoritative sources.

== United States Army Central/U.S. Third Army ==
Lieutenant General John J. Yeosock

=== XVIII Airborne Corps ===
LTG Gary E. Luck

Division Daguet (France)
Brigadier General Bernard Janvier

6^{e} Régiment de Commandement et de Soutien
1^{er} Régiment de Parachutistes d'Infanterie de Marine
2^{e} Régiment d'Infanterie de Marine
6^{e} Régiment Étranger de Génie
Group East (Groupement Est)

4^{e} Régiment de Dragons (AMX-30 main battle tanks)
3^{e} Régiment d'Infanterie de Marine (VAB)
3^{e} Régiment d'Helicopteres de Combat
2x artillery battalions from 18th Field Artillery Brigade (M198 howitzers)

Group West (Groupement Ouest)

1^{er} Régiment Étranger de Cavalerie (AMX 10 RC)
1^{er} Régiment de Spahis (AMX 10 RC)
2^{e} Régiment Étranger d'Infanterie (VAB)
11^{e} Régiment d'Artillerie de Marine (TRF1 howitzers)
1^{e} Régiment d'Helicopteres de Combat
1x artillery battalion from 18th Field Artillery Brigade (M198 howitzers)

2nd Brigade, 82nd Airborne Division

1st BN, 325th Infantry Regiment (Abn)
2nd BN, 325th Infantry Regiment (Abn)
4th BN, 325th Infantry Regiment (Abn)
2nd BN, 319th Field Artillery Regiment (Abn) (105T)

82nd Airborne Division
MG James H. Johnson Jr.

1st Brigade

1st BN, 504th Infantry Regiment (Abn)
2nd BN, 504th Infantry Regiment (Abn)
3rd BN, 504th Infantry Regiment (Abn)
3rd BN, 319th Field Artillery Regiment (Abn) (105T)

2nd Brigade, detached to Division Daguet
3rd Brigade

1st BN, 505th Infantry Regiment (Abn)
2nd BN, 505th Infantry Regiment (Abn)
3rd BN, 505th Infantry Regiment (Abn)
1st BN, 319th Field Artillery Regiment (Abn) (105T)

101st Airborne Division (Air Aslt)
MG J. H. Binford Peay III

1st Brigade

1st BN, 327th Infantry Regiment (Air Aslt)
2nd BN, 327th Infantry Regiment (Air Aslt)
3rd BN, 327th Infantry Regiment (Air Aslt) – Sent to 2nd BDE on Feb 27, 91
2nd BN, 320th Field Artillery Regiment (Air Aslt) (105T)

2nd Brigade

1st BN, 502nd Infantry Regiment (Air Aslt) – With 1st BDE until Feb 27, 91
3rd BN, 502nd Infantry Regiment (Air Aslt)
1st BN, 320th Field Artillery Regiment (Air Aslt) (105T)

3rd Brigade

1st BN, 187th Infantry Regiment (Air Aslt)
2nd BN, 187th Infantry Regiment (Air Aslt)
3rd BN, 187th Infantry Regiment (Air Aslt)
3rd BN, 320th Field Artillery Regiment (Air Aslt) (105T)

24th Infantry Division (Mech)
MG Barry McCaffrey

1st Brigade

4th BN, 64th Armor Regiment
2nd BN, 7th Infantry Regiment (Mech)
3rd BN, 7th Infantry Regiment (Mech)
1st BN, 41st Field Artillery Regiment (155SP)

2nd Brigade

1st BN, 64th Armor Regiment
3rd BN, 69th Armor Regiment
3rd BN, 15th Infantry Regiment (Mech)
3rd BN, 41st Field Artillery Regiment (155SP)

197th Infantry Brigade (Mech) – Acting 3rd Brigade

2nd BN, 69th Armor Regiment
1st BN, 18th Infantry Regiment (Mech)
2nd BN, 18th Infantry Regiment (Mech)
4th BN, 41st Field Artillery Regiment(155SP)

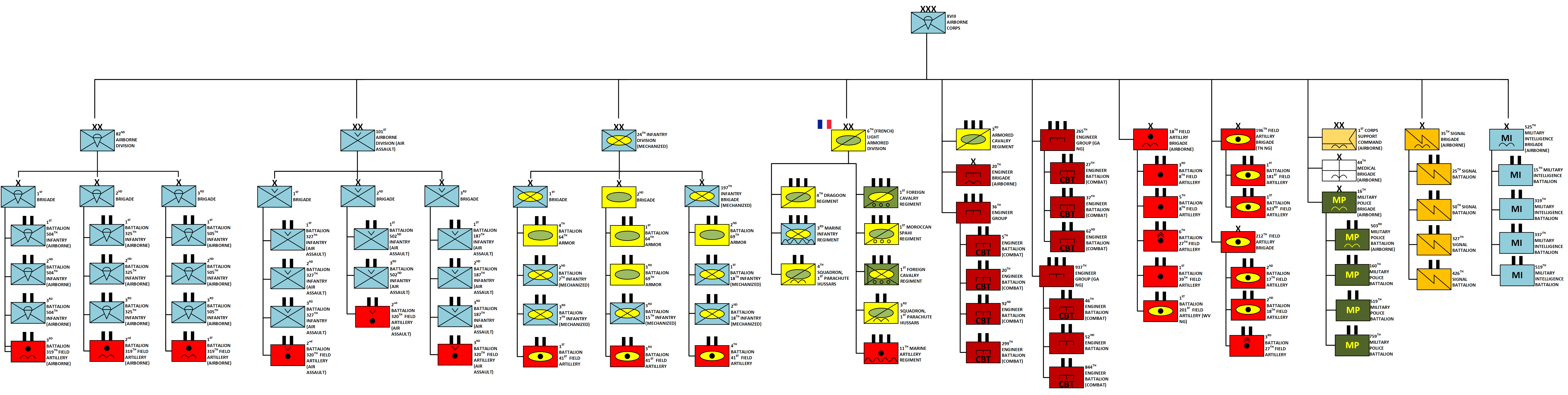
XVIII Airborne Corps order of battle during Operation Desert Storm

==== Corps assets ====
3rd Armored Cavalry Regiment COL Douglas Starr

1st Squadron (ACS) ("Tiger"), 3rd ACR
2nd Squadron (ACS) ("Sabre"), 3rd ACR
3rd Squadron (ACS) ("Thunder"), 3rd ACR
4th Squadron (RAS) ("Longknife"), 3rd ACR
3rd BN, 18th Field Artillery Regiment - Detached from 212th Field Artillery Brigade

20th Engineer Brigade (Abn)

36th Engineer Group – Supported 24th Inf Div

5th Engineer Battalion (CBT)
20th Engineer Battalion (CBT)
92nd Engineer Battalion (CBT HVY)
299th Engineer Battalion (CBT)

265th Engineer Group GA ARNG – Supported 24th Inf Div

27th Engineer Battalion (CBT)(Abn)
37th Engineer Battalion (CBT)(Abn)
62nd Engineer Battalion (CBT HVY)

937th Engineer Group – Supported 6th Lt Armor Div

46th Engineer Battalion (CBT HVY)
52nd Engineer Battalion
844th Engineer Battalion (CBT HVY)

18th Field Artillery Brigade (Abn) – Supported Division Daguet

3rd BN, 8th Field Artillery Regiment (155T)
5th BN, 8th Field Artillery Regiment (155T)
6th BN, 27th Field Artillery Regiment (MLRS)
1st BN, 39th Field Artillery Regiment (155T) (ABN)
1st BN, 201st Field Artillery Regiment (155SP) WV ARNG

196th Field Artillery Brigade TN ARNG

1st BN, 181st Field Artillery Regiment (203SP) TN ARNG
1st BN, 623rd Field Artillery Regiment (203SP) KY ARNG

212th Field Artillery Brigade – Supported 24th Inf Div

2nd BN, 17th Field Artillery Regiment (155SP)
2nd BN, 18th Field Artillery Regiment (203SP)
3rd BN, 27th Field Artillery Regiment (MLRS)

1st Corps Support Command (Abn)

46th Corps Support Group (Abn)
101st Corps Support Group
171st Corps Support Group USAR
507th Corps Support Group

44th Medical Brigade (Abn)

1st Medical Group

2nd Mobile Army Surgical Hospital
5th Mobile Army Surgical Hospital
10th Mobile Army Surgical Hospital
28th Combat Support Hospital
41st Combat Support Hospital
46th Combat Support Hospital
47th Combat Support Hospital

62nd Medical Group

15th Evacuation Hospital
44th Evacuation Hospital USAR
86th Evacuation Hospital
93rd Evacuation Hospital
109th Evacuation Hospital AL ARNG

16th Military Police Brigade (Abn)

160th Military Police Battalion
503rd Military Police Battalion (ABN)
519th Military Police Battalion
759th Military Police Battalion

35th Signal Brigade (Abn)

25th Signal Battalion
50th Signal Battalion
327th Signal Battalion
426th Signal Battalion

525th Military Intelligence Brigade (Abn)

15th Military Intelligence Battalion
319th Military Intelligence Battalion
337th Military Intelligence Battalion
519th Military Intelligence Battalion

=== VII Corps ===
LTG Frederick M. Franks, Jr.

1st Armored Division
MG Ronald H. Griffith

3rd Brigade, 3rd Infantry Division (Mech) – Acting 1st Brigade

4th Bn, 66th Armor Regiment
1st Bn, 7th Infantry Regiment (Mech)
4th Bn, 7th Infantry Regiment (Mech)
2nd Bn, 41st Field Artillery Regiment (155SP)

2nd Brigade

1st Bn, 35th Armor Regiment
2nd Bn, 70th Armor Regiment
4th Bn, 70th Armor Regiment
6th Bn, 6th Infantry Regiment (Mech)
2nd Bn, 1st Field Artillery Regiment (155SP)

3rd Brigade

3rd Bn, 35th Armor Regiment
1st Bn, 37th Armor Regiment
7th Bn, 6th Infantry Regiment (Mech)
3rd Bn, 1st Field Artillery Regiment (155SP)

3rd Armored Division
MG Paul E. Funk

1st Brigade

4th Bn, 32nd Armor Regiment
4th Bn, 34th Armor Regiment
3rd Bn, 5th Cavalry Regiment (Mech)
5th Bn, 5th Cavalry Regiment (Mech)
3rd Bn, 1st Field Artillery Regiment (155SP)

2nd Brigade

4th Bn, 18th Infantry Regiment (Mech)
3rd Bn, 8th Cavalry Regiment (Armor)
4th Bn, 8th Cavalry Regiment (Armor)
4th Bn, 82nd Field Artillery Regiment (155SP)

3rd Brigade

5th Bn, 18th Infantry Regiment (Mech)
2nd Bn, 67th Armor Regiment
4th Bn, 67th Armor Regiment
2nd Bn, 82nd Field Artillery Regiment (155SP)

1st Infantry Division (Mech)
MG Thomas Rhame

1st Brigade

5th Bn, 16th Infantry Regiment (Mech)
1st Bn, 34th Armor Regiment
2nd Bn, 34th Armor Regiment
1st Bn, 5th Field Artillery Regiment (155SP)

2nd Brigade

2nd Bn, 16th Infantry Regiment (Mech)
3rd Bn, 37th Armor Regiment
4th Bn, 37th Armor Regiment
4th Bn, 5th Field Artillery Regiment (155SP)

3rd Brigade, 2nd Armored Division – Acting 3rd Brigade

1st Bn, 41st Infantry Regiment (Mech)
2nd Bn, 66th Armor Regiment
3rd Bn, 66th Armor Regiment
4th Bn, 3rd Field Artillery Regiment (155SP)

1st Armoured Division (British Army)
Maj Gen Rupert Smith

4th Armoured Brigade
Brigadier Christopher Hammerbeck

14th/20th King's Hussars & squadron of Life Guards (Challenger 1 )
1st Bn, Royal Scots (Warrior)
3rd Bn, Royal Regiment of Fusiliers (Warrior)
2nd Field Regiment, RA (155SP)
23 Engineer Regiment (AVRE)

7th Armoured Brigade
Brig. Patrick Cordingley

Royal Scots Dragoon Guards & troops of 17th/21st Lancers (Challenger)
Queen's Royal Irish Hussars (Challenger)
1st Bn, Staffordshire Regiment (Warrior)
40th Field Regiment RA (155SP)
21 Engineer Regiment (AVRE)

Divisional Armoured Reconnaissance unit

16th/5th The Queen's Royal Lancers & squadron Queen's Dragoon Guards (Scimitar/Spartan/Striker)

Divisional Artillery Group

32nd Heavy Regiment RA (203SP)
39th Heavy Regiment RA (MLRS)
26th Field Regiment RA (155SP)
12th Air Defence Regiment RA (Rapier)

1st Cavalry Division(-) Missing 3rd Brigade
MG John H. Tilelli, Jr.

1st Brigade

3rd Bn, 32nd Armor Regiment
2nd Bn, 8th Cavalry Regiment (Armor)
2nd Bn, 5th Cavalry Regiment (Mech)
1st Bn, 82nd Field Artillery Regiment (155SP)

2nd Brigade

1st Bn, 32nd Armor Regiment
1st Bn, 5th Cavalry Regiment (Mech)
1st Bn, 8th Cavalry Regiment (Armor)
3rd Bn, 82nd Field Artillery Regiment (155SP)

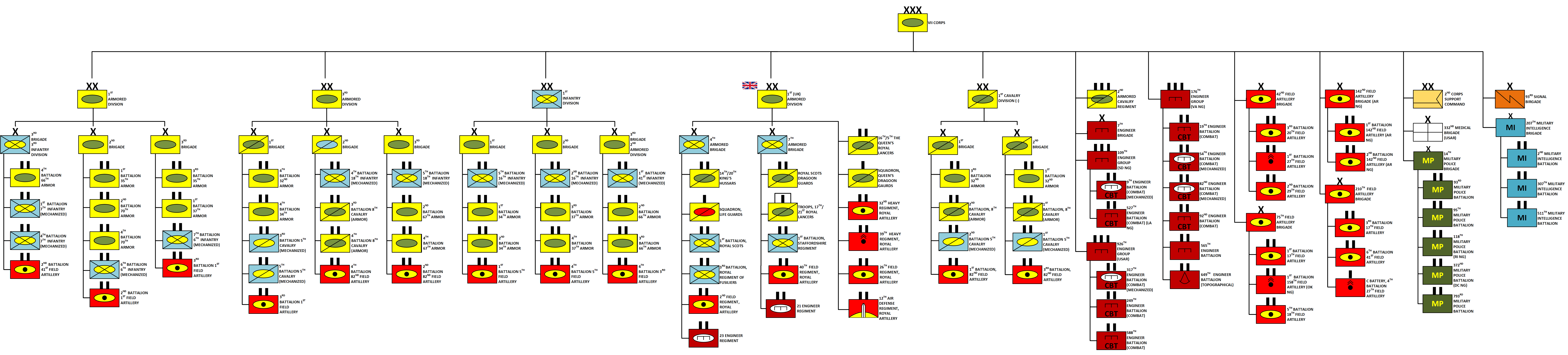
Order of battle graphic showing VII U.S. Army Corps during Operation Desert Storm

==== Corps assets ====
2nd Armored Cavalry Regiment

7th Engineer Brigade

109th Engineer Group SD ARNG – Supported VII Corp

9th Engineer Battalion (CBT)(MECH)
527th Engineer Battalion (CBT HVY) LA ARNG

176th Engineer Group VA ARNG – Supported 1st Inf Div

19th Engineer Battalion (Corps CBT)
54th Engineer Battalion (CBT)(MECH)
82nd Engineer Battalion (CBT)(MECH)
92nd Engineer Battalion (CBT HVY)
565th Engineer Battalion
649th Engineer Battalion (TOPO)

926th Engineer Group USAR – Supported 1st Arm Div

249th Engineer Battalion (CBT HVY)
317th Engineer Battalion (CBT)(MECH)
588th Engineer Battalion (CORPS CBT)

42nd Field Artillery Brigade – Supported 1st Inf Div, 3rd Armd Div

3rd Bn, 20th Field Artillery Regiment (155SP)
1st Bn, 27th Field Artillery Regiment (MLRS)
2nd Bn, 29th Field Artillery Regiment (155SP)

75th Field Artillery Brigade – Supported 1st Inf Div, 1st Armd Div

1st Bn, 17th Field Artillery Regiment (155SP)
5th Bn, 18th Field Artillery Regiment (203SP)
1st Bn, 158th Field Artillery Regiment (MLRS) OK ARNG

142nd Field Artillery Brigade AR ARNG – Supported 1st Inf Div, 1st UK Armd Div

1st Bn, 142nd Field Artillery Regiment (203SP) AR ARNG
2nd Bn, 142nd Field Artillery Regiment (203SP) AR ARNG

210th Field Artillery Brigade – Supported 2nd ACR, 1st Inf Div

3rd Bn, 17th Field Artillery Regiment (155SP)
6th Bn, 41st Field Artillery Regiment (155SP)
C Btry, 4th Battalion, 27th Field Artillery (MLRS)

2nd Corps Support Command

7th Corps Support Group

6th Transportation Battalion
71st Maintenance Battalion
87th Maintenance Battalion
213th Support Battalion

16th Corps Support Group

4th Transportation Battalion
101st Ordinance Battalion
13th Support Battalion
300th Service & Support Battalion

30th Corps Support Group NC ARNG

136th Quartermaster Battalion
690th Maintenance Battalion

43rd Corps Support Group

68th Transportation Battalion
169th Maintenance Battalion
544th Maintenance Battalion
553rd Service & Support Battalion

159th Corps Support Group USAR

286th Service & Support Battalion

332nd Medical Brigade USAR

127th Medical Group AL ARNG

31st Combat Support Hospital
128th Combat Support Hospital
377th Combat Support Hospital USAR
403rd Combat Support Hospital USAR

341st Medical Group USAR

159th Mobile Army Surgical Hospital LA ARNG
475th Mobile Army Surgical Hospital KY ARNG
807th Mobile Army Surgical Hospital USAR
912th Mobile Army Surgical Hospital USAR
345th Combat Support Hospital USAR – Converted to a MASH in January

Task Forces Evac (Provisional)

12th Evacuation Hospital
13th Evacuation Hospital WI ARNG
148th Evacuation Hospital AR ARNG
312th Evacuation Hospital USAR
410th Evacuation Hospital USAR

14th Military Police Brigade

93rd Military Police Battalion
95th Military Police Battalion
118th Military Police Battalion RI ARNG
372nd Military Police Battalion DC ARNG
793rd Military Police Battalion

93rd Signal Brigade

207th Military Intelligence Brigade

2nd Military Intelligence Battalion
307th Military Intelligence Battalion
511th Military Intelligence Battalion

=== Joint Forces Command North ===
Egyptian Corps (reportedly II Corps)

3rd Mechanized Infantry Division
4th Armored Division
Ranger Regiment

Syrian Division

9th Armoured Division
Special Forces Regiment (CPGW) or 45th Commando Brigade

Force Muthannah

Saudi 20th Mechanized Brigade
Kuwaiti 35th Mechanized Brigade

Force SAAD [capitalized in original]

Saudi 4th Armored Brigade
Kuwaiti 15th Infantry Brigade

JFC-N Troops

Niger Infantry Battalion
1st Aviation Battalion (RSLF)
15th Field Artillery Battalion (RSLF)

=== I Marine Expeditionary Force ===
LTG Walter E. Boomer

Headquarters and Service Company

1st Marine Division (Reinforced)

1st Marine Regiment (TF Papa Bear)

1st BN, 1st Marine Regiment
3rd BN, 9th Marine Regiment
1st Tank Battalion

3rd Marine Regiment (TF Taro)

1st BN, 3rd Marine Regiment
2nd BN, 3rd Marine Regiment
3rd BN, 3rd Marine Regiment

4th Marine Regiment (TF Grizzly)

2nd BN, 7th Marine Regiment
3rd BN, 7th Marine Regiment

7th Marine Regiment (TF Ripper)

1st BN, 5th Marine Regiment
1st BN, 7th Marine Regiment
3rd Tank Battalion

11th Marine Regiment (TF King)

1st BN, 11th Marine Regiment (155T)
3rd BN, 11th Marine Regiment (155T)
5th BN, 11th Marine Regiment (155T/155SP/203SP)
1st BN, 12th Marine Regiment (155T)
3rd BN, 12th Marine Regiment (155T)

1st Reconnaissance Battalion
1st Light Armored Infantry Battalion(-)(Reinforced) (TF Shepherd)
1st Battalion, 25th Marines(TF Warden)

2nd Marine Division (Reinforced)

(Tiger Brigade)1st Brigade, 2nd Armored Division (Army)

1st BN, 67th Armor Regiment
3rd BN, 67th Armor Regiment
2nd Tank Battalion (USMC)
3rd BN, 41st Infantry Regiment (Mech)
1st BN, 3rd Field Artillery Regiment (155SP)

6th Marine Regiment

2nd BN, 2nd Marine Regiment
1st BN, 6th Marine Regiment
3rd BN, 6th Marine Regiment
8th Tank Battalion USMCR

8th Marine Regiment

2nd BN, 4th Marine Regiment
1st BN, 8th Marine Regiment
3rd BN, 23rd Marine Regiment
Bravo/Charlie Companies 4th Tank Battalion USMCR

10th Marine Regiment

2nd BN, 10th Marine Regiment (155T)
3rd BN, 10th Marine Regiment (155T)
5th BN, 10th Marine Regiment (155SP/203SP)
2nd BN, 12th Marine Regiment (155T)
A Battery, 92nd Field Artillery (US Army MLRS)

==== Corps assets ====
1st Surveillance, Reconnaissance, and Intelligence Group

1st Radio Battalion

1st Force Service Support Group (General Support)

General Support Group 1

Combat Service Support Detachment 131
Combat Service Support Detachment 132
2nd Supply Battalion (-) (Reinforced)
2nd Maintenance Battalion (-) (Reinforced)
6th Motor Transport Battalion (-) (Reinforced)
1st Landing Support Battalion (-) (Reinforced)
1st Dental Battalion

General Support Group 2

7th Motor Transport Battalion (-) (Reinforced)
2nd Landing Support Battalion (-)
1st Medical Battalion (-)
Combat Service Support Detachment 91

2nd Force Service Support Group (Direct Support)

7th Engineer Support Battalion (-) (Reinforced)
8th Engineer Support Battalion (-) (Reinforced)
8th Motor Transport Battalion (-) (Reinforced)
2nd Medical Battalion (-) (Reinforced)
2nd Dental Battalion (-)
Direct Support Group 1

Combat Service Support Detachment 10
Mobile Combat Service Support Detachment 11
Mobile Combat Service Support Detachment 17

Direct Support Group 2

Mobile Combat Service Support Detachment 26
Mobile Combat Service Support Detachment 28

24th Marine Regiment(-)

2nd Battalion, 24th Marines
3rd Battalion, 24th Marines

=== Joint Forces Command East ===
Force "Abu Bakr"

2nd Brigade, Saudi National Guard

Force "Othman"

Royal Saudi 8th Mechanized Brigade
Kuwaiti "Al Fatah" Brigade
Oman Motorized Infantry Battalion
Bahraini Motorized Infantry Company

Task Force "Omar"

Royal Saudi 10th Mechanized Brigade
United Arab Emirates Mechanized Battalion

Task Force "Tariq"

Royal Saudi Marine Battalion
Moroccan 6th Mechanized Battalion
Infantry Battalion (Senegal)

JFC-E Troops

Qatari Mechanized Battalion
1st East Bengal Infantry Battalion
Combat Aviation Battalion (Kuwait/UAE)
14th and 18th Field Artillery Battalions, RSLF
Engineer Force 5 Saif Allah (RSLF)

Elsewhere, temporary

Kuwaiti 2/5 Mechanized Battalion
North Omani Brigade
Task Force "Isa"
Bahraini Tank Battalion
Qatari Tank Battalion

== Iraqi forces ==
Field Marshal Saddam Hussein

=== VII Corps ===
25th Infantry Division
27th Infantry Division
28th Infantry Division
48th Infantry Division

==== Second line ====
12th Armored Division
26th Infantry Division
31st Infantry Division
47th Infantry Division

=== IV Corps ===
Maj. Gen. Iyad Khalil Zaki

16th Infantry Division
20th Infantry Division
30th Infantry Division
34th Infantry Division
36th Infantry Division

==== Second line ====
1st Mechanized Division

34th Armored Brigade
1st Mechanized Brigade
27th Mechanized Brigade

6th Armored Division
21st Infantry Division

=== III Corps ===
Maj. Gen. Salah Aboud Mahmoud

7th Infantry Division
8th Infantry Division
11th Infantry Division
14th Infantry Division
15th Infantry Division
18th Infantry Division
19th Infantry Division
29th Infantry Division

==== Second line ====
3rd Armored Division

6th and 12th Armoured Brigades
8th Mechanised Brigade

5th Mechanized Division

15th and 20th Mechanised Brigades
26th Armoured Brigade

35th Infantry Division

=== II Corps ===
Positioned around northern Kuwait

2nd Infantry Division
37th Infantry Division

==== Second line ====
51st Mechanized Division

=== Reserve ===
==== Republican Guard Forces Command ====
Lt. Gen. Iyad Futayyih

===== 1st Republican Guard Corps =====
1st Armored Division "Hammurabi"

17th and 18th Armored Brigades
8th and 9th Mechanized Brigades

2nd Armored Division "Al-Medina"

2nd and 10th Armored Brigades
14th Mechanized Brigade

3rd Mechanized Division "Tawakalna"

9th Armored Brigade
18th and 29th Mechanized Brigades

4th Motorized Division "Al-Faw"
8th Infantry Division "As Saiqa" (special forces)

===== 2nd Republican Guard Corps =====
5th Mechanized Division "Baghdad"

4th, 5th and 6th Motorized Brigades

6th Mechanized Division "Nebuchadnezzar"

19th, 22nd and 23rd Motorized Brigades

7th Motorized Division "Adnan"

21st Armored Brigade
11th and 12th Motorized Brigades

===== IX Corps =====
10th Armored Division
17th Armored Division
52nd Armored Division
45th Infantry Division
49th Infantry Division
