= Headquarters Regiment =

- Country: United States
- Allegiance: United States of America
- Branch: United States Marine Corps
- Type: Logistics
- Part of: 2nd Marine Logistics Group; II Marine Expeditionary Force
- Garrison/HQ: Marine Corps Base Camp Lejeune
- Motto: Warriors sustaining warriors
- Engagements: Operation Iraqi Freedom

Commanders
- Current commander: None

Headquarters Regiment (HQ REGT) was a logistics regiment based at Marine Corps Base Camp Lejeune, North Carolina and falls under the command of the 2nd Marine Logistics Group (2nd MLG) and the II Marine Expeditionary Force (II MEF), United States Marine Corps. Headquarters Regiment was redesignated as Combat Logistics Regiment 27 (CLR 27).

== Mission ==
Provide combat logistics to 2d Marine Expeditionary Brigade (MEB) and command, control and coordination of logistics services to II MEF forces. Execute Maritime Pre-positioning Force (MPF) operations in order to achieve rapid build-up of combat power. Provide combat logistics to Marine Expeditionary Units and provide terminal operation support to deploying II MEF forces.

== Subordinate units ==
- Combat Logistics Battalion 22
- Combat Logistics Battalion 24
- Combat Logistics Battalion 26

== See also ==
- List of United States Marine Corps regiments
- Organization of the United States Marine Corps
