= Fires (military) =

Fires is the related tasks and systems that provide collective and coordinated use of Army indirect fires, air and missile defense, and joint fires through the targeting process. Alternatively, it can be defined as the use of weapon systems to create a specific lethal or nonlethal effect on a target.

Fires has traditionally focused on fire support systems such as artillery and close air support, but is increasingly being used to refer to non-lethal systems including information operations, cyberwarfare, and civilian-military relationships.

== Warfighting Function ==
Fires is one of the six warfighting functions defined by the US Army, which also includes movement and maneuver, intelligence, sustainment, command and control, and protection. The fires warfighting function is the related tasks and systems that provide collective and coordinated use of Army indirect fires, AMD, and joint fires through the targeting process. Army fires systems deliver fires in support of offensive and defensive tasks to create specific lethal and nonlethal effects on a target. The fires warfighting function, as defined by the Army, includes the following tasks:

- Deliver fires.
- Integrate all forms of Army, joint, and multinational fires.
- Conduct targeting.

The Marine Corps defines the fires warfighting function as "Fires harass, suppress, neutralize, or destroy to accomplish the targeting objective, which may be to disrupt, delay, limit, persuade, or influence. Fires include the collective and coordinated use of target acquisition systems, direct and indirect fire weapons, armed aircraft of all types, and other lethal and nonlethal means. Fires are normally used in concert with maneuver, which helps shape the battlespace, setting conditions for decisive action." Harassment, suppression, neutralization, and destruction are key words used in targeting to define the impact of the weapon system on the target. Persuasion and influence are tasks related to nonlethal fires such as influence operations.
