= 22nd Marine Expeditionary Unit =

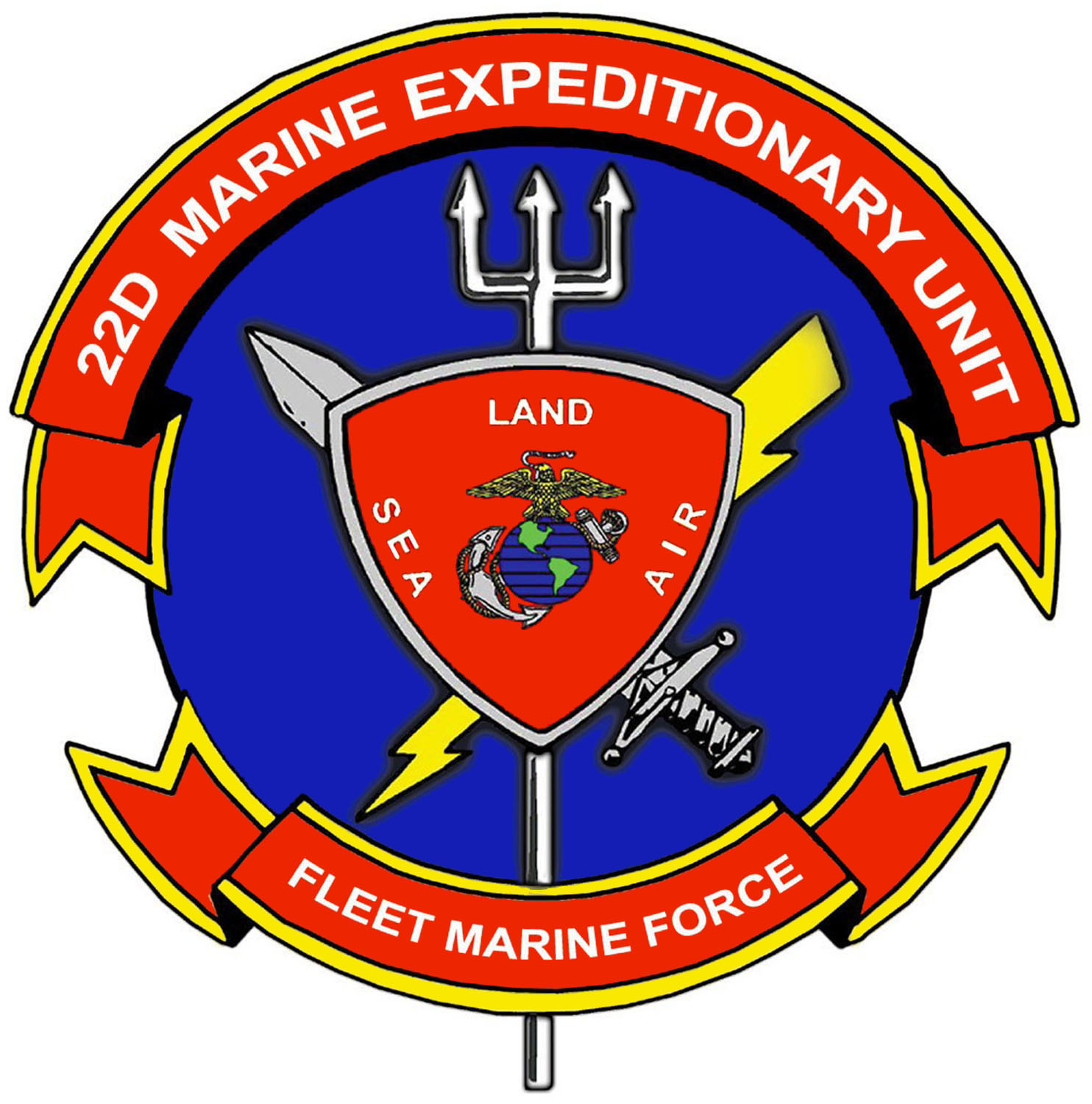
- 22nd Marine Expeditionary Unit insignia
- Active: 1 December 1982 – present
- Country: United States of America
- Branch: United States Marine Corps
- Type: Special Operations Capable - Marine Air Ground Task Force
- Role: Forward-deployed, Crisis response force
- Size: ~ 2,200 (when composited)
- Part of: II Marine Expeditionary Force
- Nickname: 22nd MEU
- Mottos: "Capable, Ready, Lethal"
- Engagements: Multinational Force in Lebanon; United States invasion of Grenada; Operation Restore Hope; Operation Provide Promise; Operation Joint Guardian; War in Afghanistan; Iraq War; Operation Unified Response; Operation Odyssey Dawn; Operation Unified Protector; Operation Inherent Resolve; US intervention against ISIL in Libya; 2025 United States military campaign against cartels Operation Southern Spear
- Website: 22ndmeu.marines.mil

Commanders
- Notable commanders: Col. Thomas N. Trimble Col. Wheeler L. Baker Col. Paul C. Merida; Col. Michael J. Perez; Col. Todd P. Simmons; Col. Douglas M. Stilwell; Col. Kenneth F. McKenzie Jr. Col. Eric J. Steidl Col. Gareth F. Brandl

The 22nd Marine Expeditionary Unit (22nd MEU) is one of seven such units currently in existence in the United States Marine Corps. It is a Marine Air Ground Task Force with a strength of about 2,200 personnel. They are currently based out of Marine Corps Base Camp Lejeune, North Carolina and fall under the command of the II Marine Expeditionary Force. It is the most decorated of the U.S. Marine Corps' seven MEUs.

== Mission ==
"Provide the United States with a forward-deployed, amphibious force-in-readiness capable of executing mission across the full spectrum of combat and military operations other than war."

== Structure ==
Insignias of the 22nd Marine Expeditionary Unit

The MEU consists of four basic elements:

Command Element (CE): Serves as the headquarters for the entire unit and allows a single command to exercise control over all ground, aviation and combat service support forces.

Ground Combat Element (GCE): Built around a Marine infantry battalion, the GCE is reinforced with artillery, amphibious vehicles, engineers and reconnaissance assets.

Aviation Combat Element (ACE): Consists of a composite medium tiltrotor (MV-22B Osprey) squadron containing transport aviation assets of various models and capabilities, attack helicopters and jets, air defense teams and all necessary ground support assets.

Logistics Combat Element (LCE): Provides the MEU with mission-essential support such as medical/dental assistance, motor transport, supply, equipment maintenance and landing is the mission of the LCE.

== Current subordinate units ==
- Command Element: MEU commander and his supporting staff, provides command and control over the other three elements when composited.
  - Ground Combat Element: 3rd Battalion, 6th Marines (3/6)
  - Aviation Combat Element: Marine Medium Tiltrotor Squadron 263 (VMM-263)
  - Logistics Combat Element: Combat Logistics Battalion 26 (CLB-26).

== History ==
=== 1980s ===
The 22nd Marine Expeditionary Unit (MEU) was activated on 1 December 1982 as the 22nd Marine Amphibious Unit (MAU).

The MEU's activation was the redesignation of the 32nd MAU, a unit that regularly deployed to the Mediterranean and Caribbean regions for more than 20 years. On its final deployment, the MAU evacuated the Palestine Liberation Organization from Beirut, and was the first American unit to serve in the multi-national peace-keeping force in Lebanon.

On 22nd MAU's maiden deployment, it again visited Beirut where the Marines and Sailors served until May 1983, were present during the April 1983 United States embassy bombing, and began preparing for a third deployment to Lebanon upon return to the United States. On 18 October 1983, the MAU departed the United States, and less than two days into its trans-Atlantic voyage it was diverted to the southern Caribbean.

On 25 October 1983, the MAU participated in Operation Urgent Fury, the invasion of the island of Grenada, which was at that time, the largest U.S. military operation since the Vietnam War. The 22nd MAU conducted numerous helicopter and surface landings over three days and occupied 75 percent of the island; though the Marines constituted less than 20 percent of the total invasion force.

By 2 November of that same year, the unit transited to Beirut where it landed later that month. The MAU remained ashore until late February 1984, when the mission drew to a close, and evacuated hundreds of American citizens from the country.

Throughout the rest of the 1980s, the 22nd MAU deployed on a rotation basis with the 24th and 26th MAUs, participating in numerous contingency operations and exercises.

In 1986, the 22nd MAU was the third unit to deploy with the 'Special Operations-Capable' designation.

On 5 February 1988, the word 'Amphibious' was replaced with 'Expeditionary' to reflect the Marine Corps' changing role in national defense and theater security.

=== 1990s ===
In late 1990 the 22nd MEU disbanded down to the command element during the Gulf war and reformed the summer of 1991. Saipan, Nashville, and the Harlan County were the ships they were on.

In September 1991, the deployment the MEU participated in the first combined arms exercise in Kuwait following Operations Desert Shield and Operation Desert Storm. This deployment returned in March 1992.

Conflict in the Balkans kept the MEU busy during subsequent deployments as the unit participated in operations Operation Provide Promise, Operation Deny Flight and Operation Sharp Guard. In 1993, the MEU also served during the United Nations’ mission to Somalia.

In April 1996, the 22nd MEU (SOC) arrived off the coast of civil war torn Liberia in western Africa for Operation Assured Response. The unit remained at sea until 2 Aug. which the Marines went ashore to reinforce the U.S. Embassy in Monrovia and evacuated U.S. citizens and designated third-country nationals. The MEU (SOC) evacuated more than 1,600 civilians over the course of the next several weeks, until the 26th MEU arrived to provide relief.

The MEU's deployments in 1996 and 1997 focused on West Africa as it answered the call to conduct reinforcement and evacuation missions in Liberia, Zaire, the Central African Republic, the Republic of Congo and Sierra Leone. Additionally, the MEU continued to support Balkans peace-enforcement operations and conducted a non-combatant evacuation operation (NEO) in Albania.

In 1998, the 22nd MEU served in Bosnia and Kosovo, and was prepared to support operations in both Albania and Africa. Marine General, Anthony Henderson, led Lima company within this MEU.

=== Global War on Terror ===
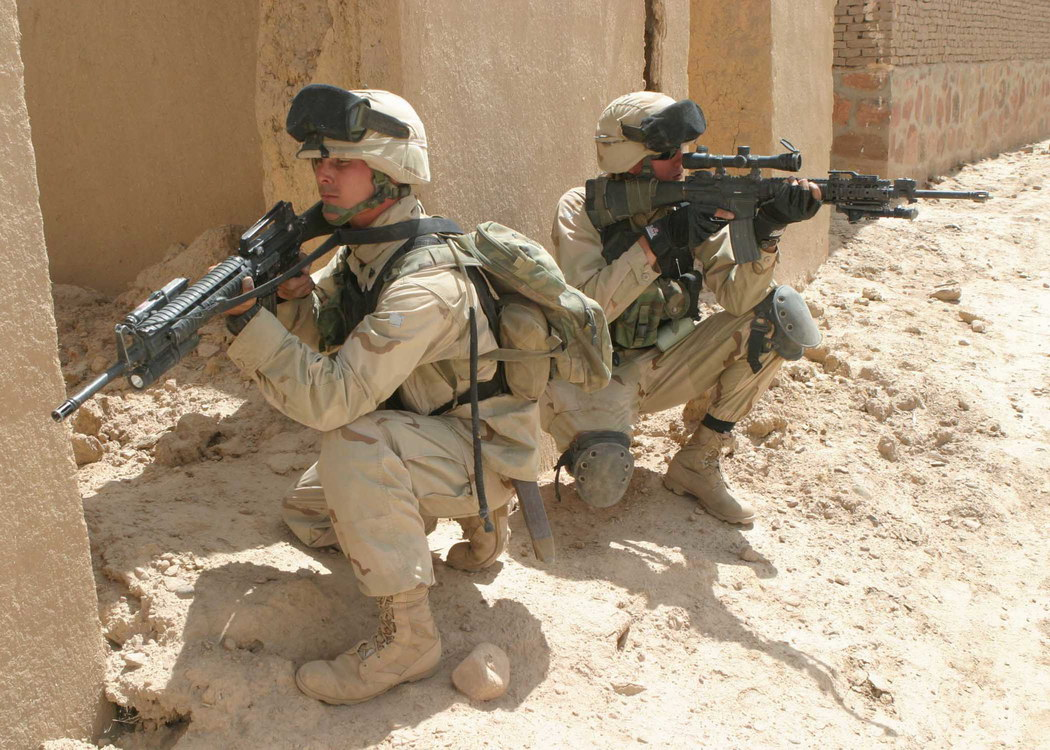
Marines from BLT 1st Battalion 6th Marines in Oruzgan province, Afghanistan in May 2004

The MEU deployed during the turn of the millennium when it served as a [Y2K] contingency force, and also returned to the Balkans. The MEU later returned to Kosovo in 2001.

During the MEU's 2002 deployment, the 22nd MEU took part in several anti-terrorist missions in the Central Command theater, including Afghanistan, Pakistan, and also launched life-saving humanitarian efforts in Djibouti.

In 2004, they again deployed to Afghanistan where the unit inserted deep in Afghanistan's remote Oruzgan Province where it established Forward Operating Base Ripley. For four months, the MEU carried out an aggressive campaign against Taliban and anti-coalition factions in the area where senior Army officials considered it the most successful campaign in the history of Operation Enduring Freedom.

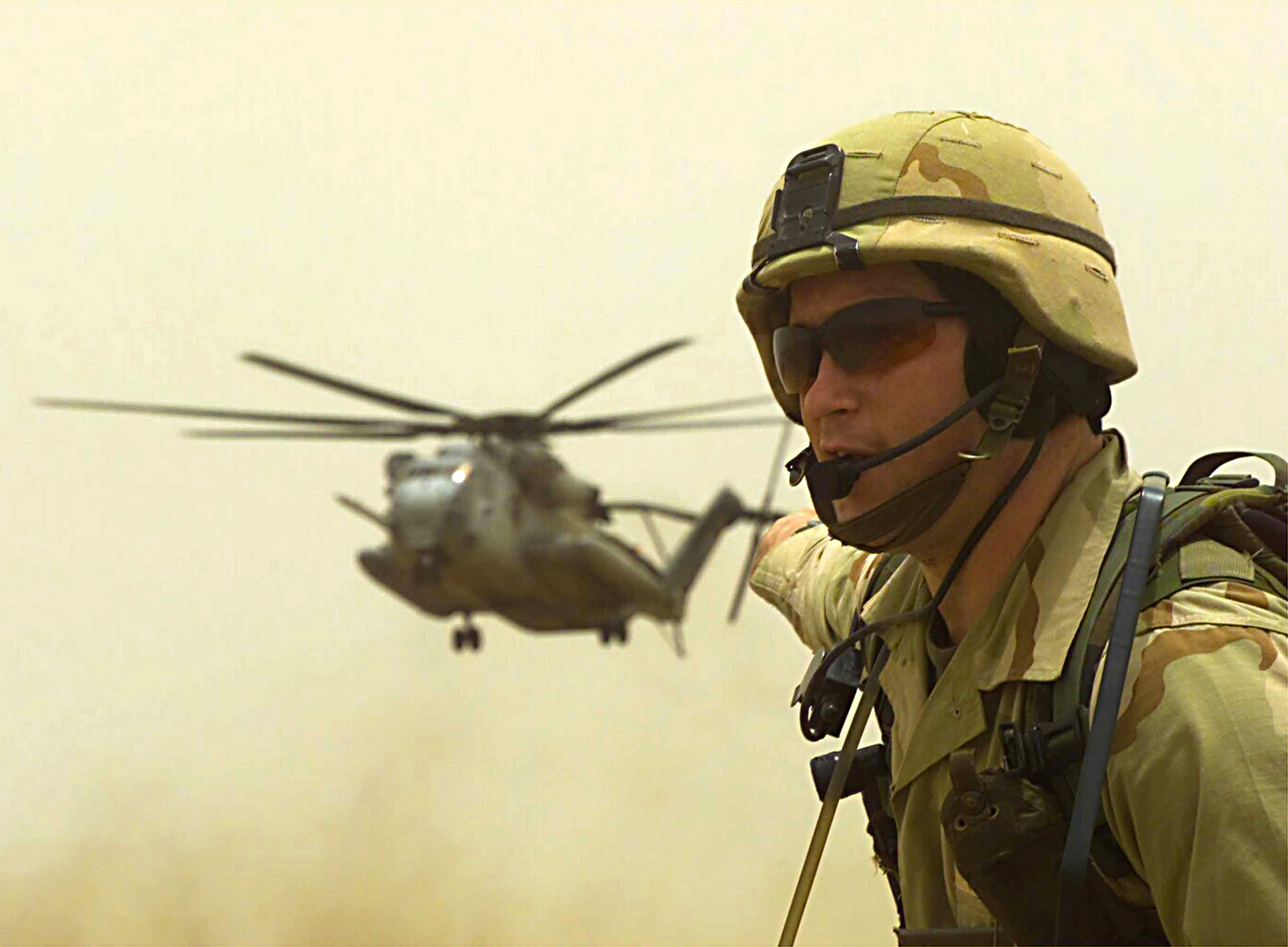
Marine from the U.S. 22nd MEU participates in a long-range deployment exercise from the amphibious assault ship USS Wasp (LHD 1) into Djibouti, August 2002.

The 2005-2006 deployment saw the members of the 22nd MEU in Iraq, battling insurgents from a forward operating base in and around the ancient city of Hīt (pronounced "heet"). Battalion Landing Team, 1st Battalion, 2nd Marines, took the fight to the enemy, MSSG-22 worked to fix roads and other critical infrastructure in the area. Over the course of its time in Iraq, the MEU participated in 14 named operations and uncovered vast quantities of insurgent arms, ammunition and ordnance.

While Battalion Landing Team, 1st Battalion, 2nd Marines, conducted combat operations against insurgents, MEU Service Support Group-22, now Combat Logistics Battalion 22, worked to provide a better environment and fix roads and other critical infrastructure for Iraqi citizens in the area. During this time, the MEU participated in 14 named operations and uncovered vast quantities of insurgent arms, ammunition and ordnance.

The MEU's 2007 and 2008 deployment brought the unit to the Bay of Bengal where its members conducted humanitarian relief operations after Tropical Cyclone Sidr struck eastern India and Bangladesh. The MEU also supported counter piracy operations off the east coast of Africa and stood ready to support contingency operations in the Persian Gulf. Before departing the area, the 22nd MEU supported President George W. Bush's visit to Israel and provided aviation lift for the President's support personnel.

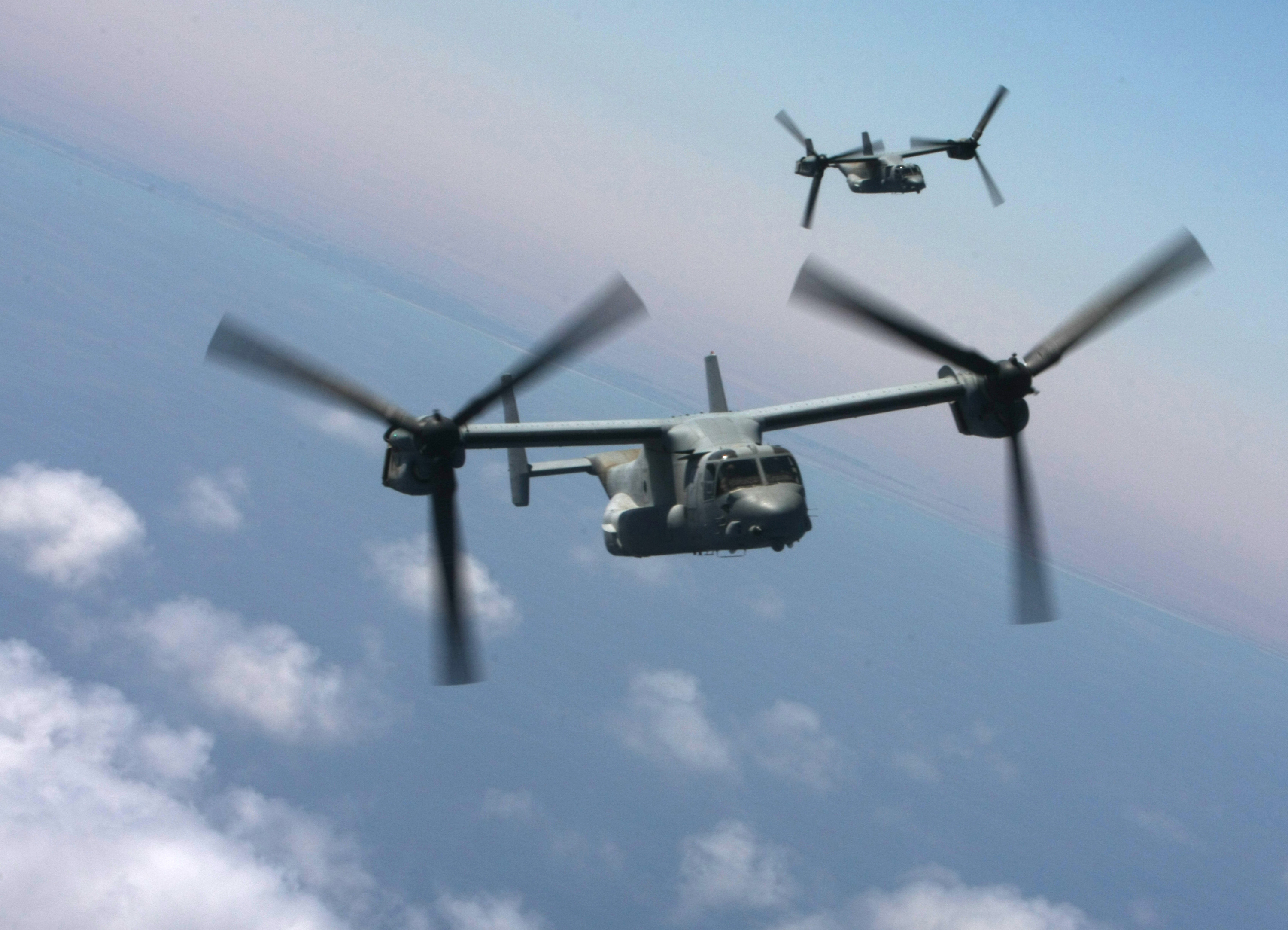
Ospreys assigned to Marine Medium Tiltrotor Squadron (VMM) 263 (Reinforced) from the 22nd MEU, fly over the Egyptian coastline during Exercise Bright Star 2009

From 25 September – 11 October 2007, AV-8B Harrier II's from the MEU flew 70 combat missions over Afghanistan providing aerial reconnaissance, close air support and convoy escort in support of Operation Enduring Freedom. Following the impact of Cyclone Sidr on 15 November 2007, the 22nd MEU, on board USS Kearsarge moved off the coast of Bangladesh in the Bay of Bengal and provided humanitarian assistance to those affected by the cyclone.

The 22nd MEU deployed from May - December 2009. The MEU was composed of Marines from the 3rd Battalion, 2nd Marines and from the Combat Logistics Battalion 22, as well as MV-22 Osprey aircraft from VMM-263. The MEU conducted numerous Theater Security Cooperation events in Europe and the Middle East during a deployment to the U.S. European Command and Central Command. In Europe, the Marines trained in Bulgaria and Greece.

The 22nd MEU also made history in May 2009 when it was the first MEU to deploy with the MV-22 Osprey aircraft tilt-rotor aircraft. During workups, the MEU experimented with different employment techniques to understand and utilize the full capability of the aircraft.

The MEU conducted four separate Theater Security Cooperation events with Middle Eastern partners to build positive relationships between militaries and strengthened regional security. Near the end of the deployment, the MEU directly supported Operation Enduring Freedom by transferring the MV-22B Osprey tilt-rotor aircraft to forces on the ground, marking the first time the aircraft would support operations in Afghanistan.

After nearly nine eventful months at sea in the U.S. 5th and 6th Fleet areas of responsibility, the 22nd MEU participated in Operation Inherent Resolve as a theater reserve and crisis response force. Marines and Sailors of the 22nd MEU with the Bataan Amphibious Ready Group (BATARG) wrapped up their deployment and returned home in October 2014.

The MEU Command Element began the unit's pre-deployment training program in December 2015 and returned from another deployment cycle December 2016. Together with BLT 1/6, VMM-264 and CLB-22, the MEU embarked aboard USS Wasp, USS San Antonio and USS Whidbey Island, which make up the Wasp Amphibious Ready Group (ARG).

On 1 August 2016, AV-8B Harrier II assigned to the 22nd MEU flying off USS Wasp in the Mediterranean to carryout airstrikes on ISIS terrorists in Libya, amidst the Libyan Civil War, specifically to support local forces fighting ISIS in Sirte as part of a broader campaign against ISIS in the country.

=== 2010 Haiti Earthquake ===
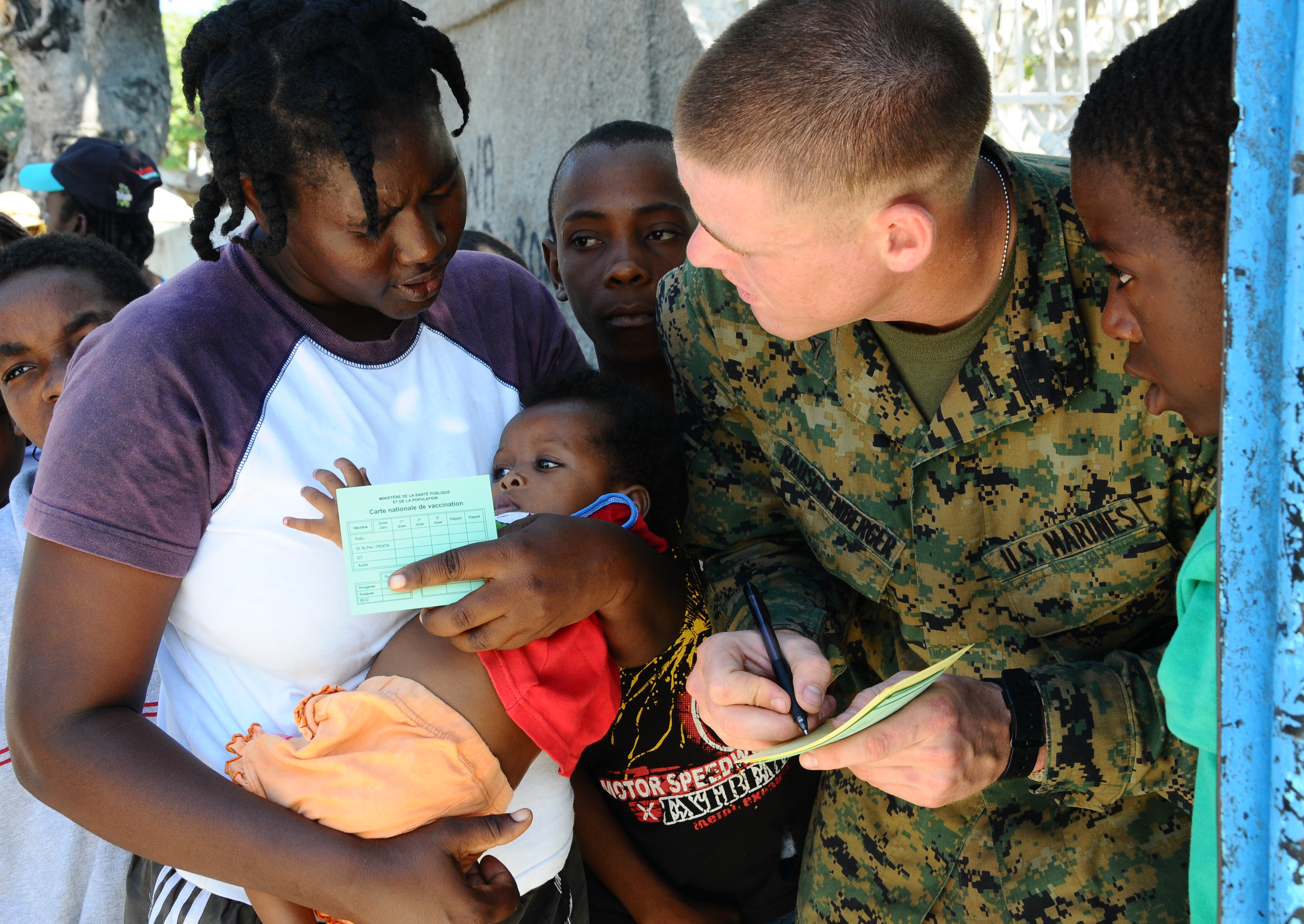
Lance Cpl. Benjamin Rauschenberg, a linguist from the MEU, helps a Haitian woman fill out an immunization card at a clinic in Grand Goave, Haiti.

After the devastating, 12 January 2010 Haiti earthquake, Marines with the 22nd MEU embarked on the Bataan Amphibious ready group for Haiti in order to conduct a humanitarian assistance and disaster relief mission known as Operation Unified Response. 22nd MEU departed Camp Lejuene on 15 January and began arriving on 18 January.

The 22nd MEU was the first major Marine force to respond, managing the hardest hit area that spanned 65 kilometers (40 mi) west of Port-au-Prince. Initially, the MEU conducted immediate relief operations by distributing food, water and providing medical care.

Units within the MEU consist of 1,600 Marines with the Combat Logistics Battalion 22, 3rd Battalion 2nd Marines, Marine Heavy Helicopter Squadron 461 and the MEU Command Element, while the ARG consisted of USS Bataan, USS Carter Hall and USS Fort McHenry.

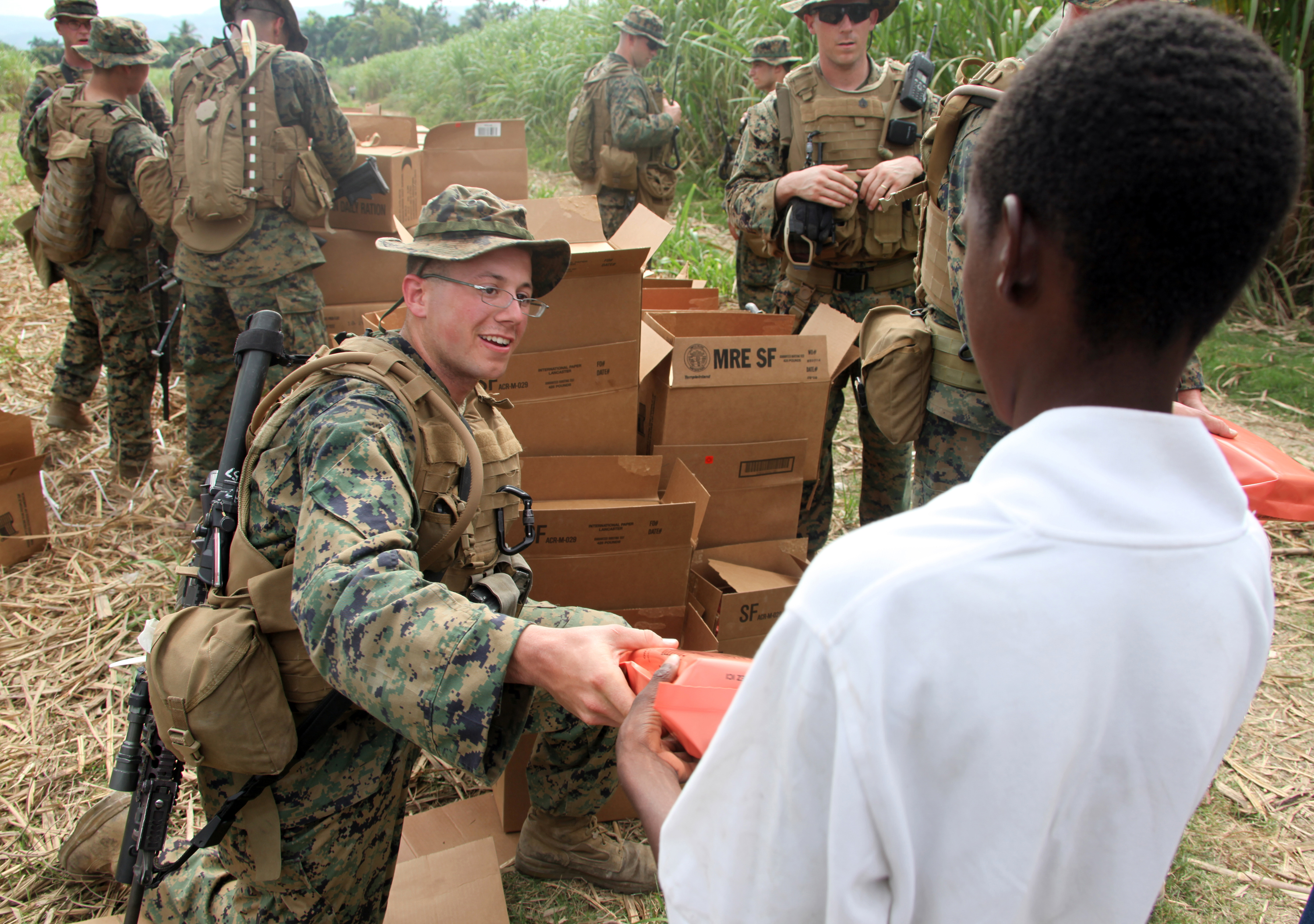
A Marine assigned to Battalion Landing Team, 3rd Battalion, 2nd Marine regiment hands humanitarian ration at an aid distribution site in Leogane, Haiti.

150 Marines aboard USS Gunston Hall joined the MEU, originally from the African Partnership Station Security Cooperation MAGTF, along with the 24th MEU on USS Nassau, USS Mesa Verde, and USS Ashland. On 24 March, the MEU and ARG were released from their mission and sailed for home.

From February to March, the MEU transitioned to sustained relief operations and focused on turning over responsibilities to the Government of Haiti and major relief organizations ashore before departing at the end of March.

While supporting relief operations, the Marines and Sailors of the 22nd MEU combined a network of sea-based logistics and land-based support with as many as 1,100 Marines and Sailors ashore to conduct immediate aid efforts. The Marines focused on a 60-kilometer area west of Port-au-Prince, from Carrefour to Leogane, through Grand Goave to Petit Goave. In order to move and distribute supplies in these areas, Marines and Sailors partnered with the United Nations, United States Agency for International Development, non-governmental organizations, and Canadian and Spanish military forces.

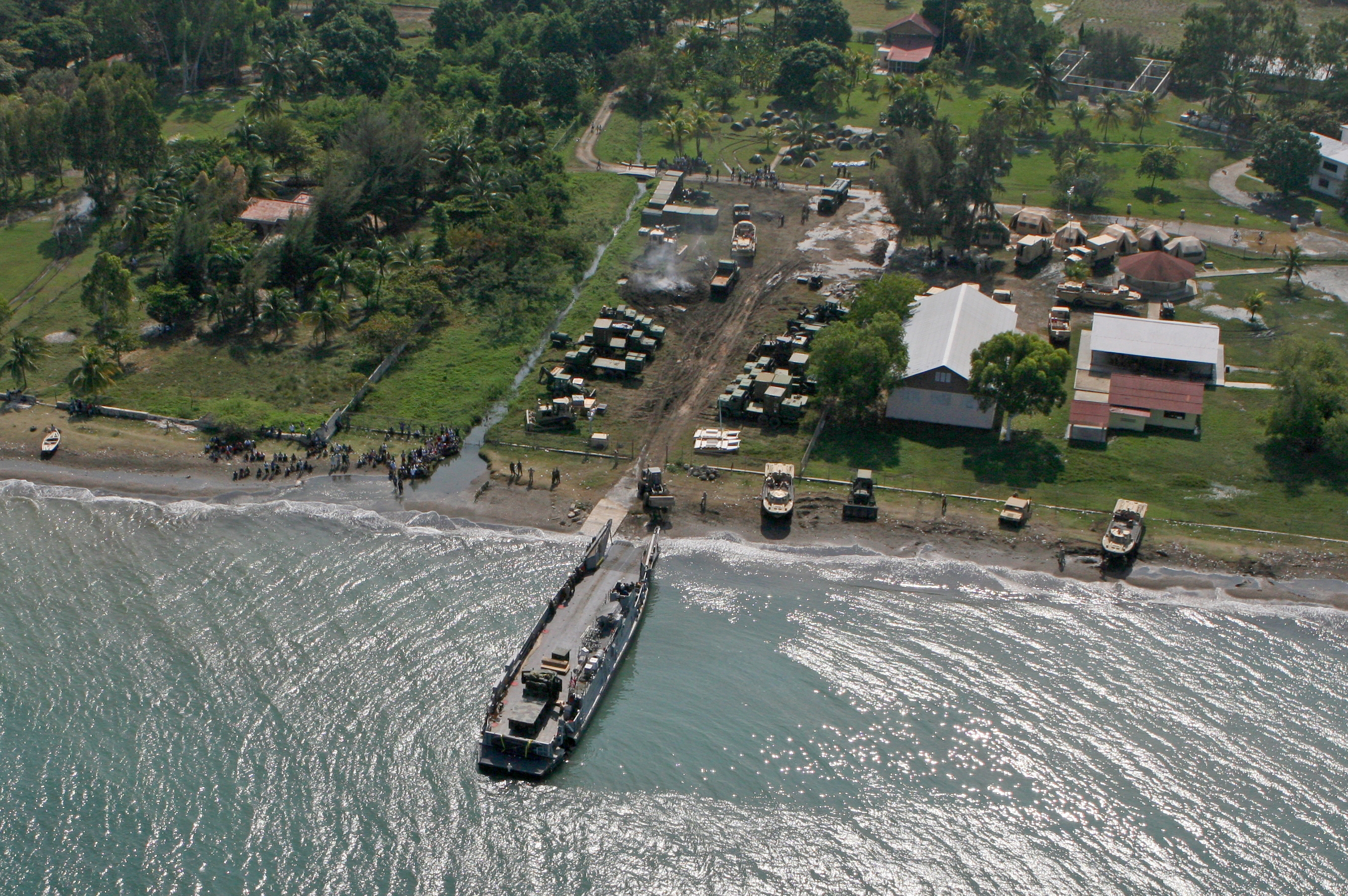
Landing ships move supplies onshore from the rescue fleet

Marines from the 22nd MEU assisted the World Food Program with the delivery of more than 3.2 million pounds of bulk foods, such as rice, for earthquake survivors at distribution points in and around Carrefour. According to the WFP, each bag of rice delivered can feed a family of five for two weeks – more than 55,000 families. During their relief assistance to Haiti, the Marines and Sailors conducted and assisted more than 1500 humanitarian relief missions.

The 22nd MEU independently delivered nearly 560,000 liters of bottled water and nearly 195,000 gallons of bulk water; more than 1.6 million pounds of rations and approximately 15,000 pounds of medical supplies, while rotary wing aircraft from the 22nd MEU flew more than 610 flight hours and 618 missions in direct support of Operation Unified Response to aid those affected by the earthquake.

Medical and dental personnel from the MEU worked alongside Navy Corpsmen to treat earthquake survivors and evacuated numerous Haitian citizens to USS Bataan for additional medical care.

=== 2011–2012 Deployment, Libyan Civil War ===
At the start of Operation Odyssey Dawn, the US-led operation in support of the Libyan civil war, the ground combat element of the 26th MEU was in Afghanistan conducting combat operations. In order to quickly provide sea-based ground troops to support possible ground intervention in Libya, the 22nd Marine Expeditionary Unit deployed in March 2011, 4 months prior to its originally scheduled deployment with Battalion Landing Team 2nd Battalion, 2nd Marines (2/2), Combat Logistics Battalion 22, and Marine Medium Tiltrotor Squadron 263 (VMM 263) aboard USS Bataan, USS Whidbey Island and USS Mesa Verde. After several months preparing for possible ground combat operations and quick reaction force for Operation Odyssey Dawn, and the subsequent NATO-led Operation Unified Protector, the 22nd MEU and the Bataan Amphibious Ready Group spent a total of 10 1/2 months at sea in the Mediterranean and Middle East conducting bi-lateral training and supporting national contingency planning as a result of the new Arab Spring. Its 321-day duration fell just eight days short of the record set in 1973 by the aircraft carrier USS Midway for the longest U.S. Navy deployment since World War II. It was said to be the longest at-sea deployment in Marine unit history. The 22nd MEU was awarded the Meritorious Unit Commendation and the NATO Non-Article 5 Medal for Operation Unified Protector.

=== 2014 Deployment ===
From February to October of 2014, the 22nd MEU composed of BLT 1/6, Marine Medium Tiltrotor Squadron 263 (VMM-263), and CLB 22 deployed to the 5th and 6th Fleet area of operations. During this deployment the USS Bataan was involved in two rescues-at-sea; rescuing two Turkish mariners from their sinking cargo ship in the Aegean Sea, and rescuing 282 migrants in the Mediterranean Sea after their small vessel sank. Also, during the deployment the Bataan and the 22nd MEU supported an assessment of humanitarian options in support of displaced Iraqi civilians trapped on Sinjar Mountain by the Islamic State of Iraq and the Levant and initiated the air campaign against the Islamic State; AV-8B Harriers from the USS Bataan participated in reconnaissance missions and at least one air strike, including the first use of Marine Corps ordnance against an ISIS-controlled target. Detachments of Marines were sent to Iraq to reinforce the US embassy in Baghdad, and support special operations forces in Kurdistan.(Navy Unit Commendation, Global War on Terrorism Expeditionary Medal).

=== 2018–2019 Deployment ===
From December 2018 to July 2019, 22nd MEU deployed to the 5th and 6th Fleet areas of responsibility as part of the KEARSARGE Amphibious Ready Ground (KSG/ARG). While deployed, 22nd MEU supported multiple operations and training exercises in the Middle East and Europe.

=== 2020 Deployment ===
From May to October 2020, 22nd MEU deployed to Moron Air Base, Spain as Special Purpose Marine Air Ground Task Force - Crisis Response - Africa (SPMAGTF-CR-AF). While deployed, 22nd MEU supported contingency operations in North Africa.

=== 2025 Deployment ===
The 22nd MEU deployed onboard the USS Iwo Jima, the USS San Antonio, and the USS Fort Lauderdale to do drill and patrol duties. They were escorted by several other ships and aircraft for Operation Southern Spear amid tensions between the United States and Venezuela just before the 2025 United States struck a Southern Caribbean boat, and now are maintaining position for the 2025 US Caribbean naval deployment

== Notable facts ==
22nd MEU was the first MEU to deploy with the MV-22 Osprey aircraft tilt-rotor aircraft in 2009.

In the film "Heartbreak Ridge" the 22nd MAU (Marine Amphibious Unit) was featured as the Marine Unit where Gunnery Sergeant Thomas Highway (played by Clint Eastwood) was the Recon Platoon's Non Commissioned Officer and landed in Grenada as part of the 22nd MEU operation.

== Unit awards ==
A unit citation or commendation is an award bestowed upon an organization for the action cited. Members of the unit who participated in said actions are allowed to wear on their uniforms the awarded unit citation. The 22nd MEU has been presented with the following awards:

Ribbon	Unit Award
	Joint Meritorious Unit Award
	Navy Unit Commendation with four Bronze Stars
	Meritorious Unit Commendation with one Silver Star
	Marine Corps Expeditionary Medal
	National Defense Service Medal with one Bronze Star
	Armed Forces Expeditionary Medal with one Silver Star
	Southwest Asia Service Medal
	Afghanistan Campaign Medal
	Iraq Campaign Medal with one Bronze Star
	Global War on Terrorism Expeditionary Medal
	Global War on Terrorism Service Medal
	Armed Forces Service Medal
	NATO Medal for Kosovo Service

== See also ==
- Marine Air-Ground Task Force
- List of Marine Expeditionary Units
- Organization of the United States Marine Corps
