= Combat Logistics Battalion 24 =

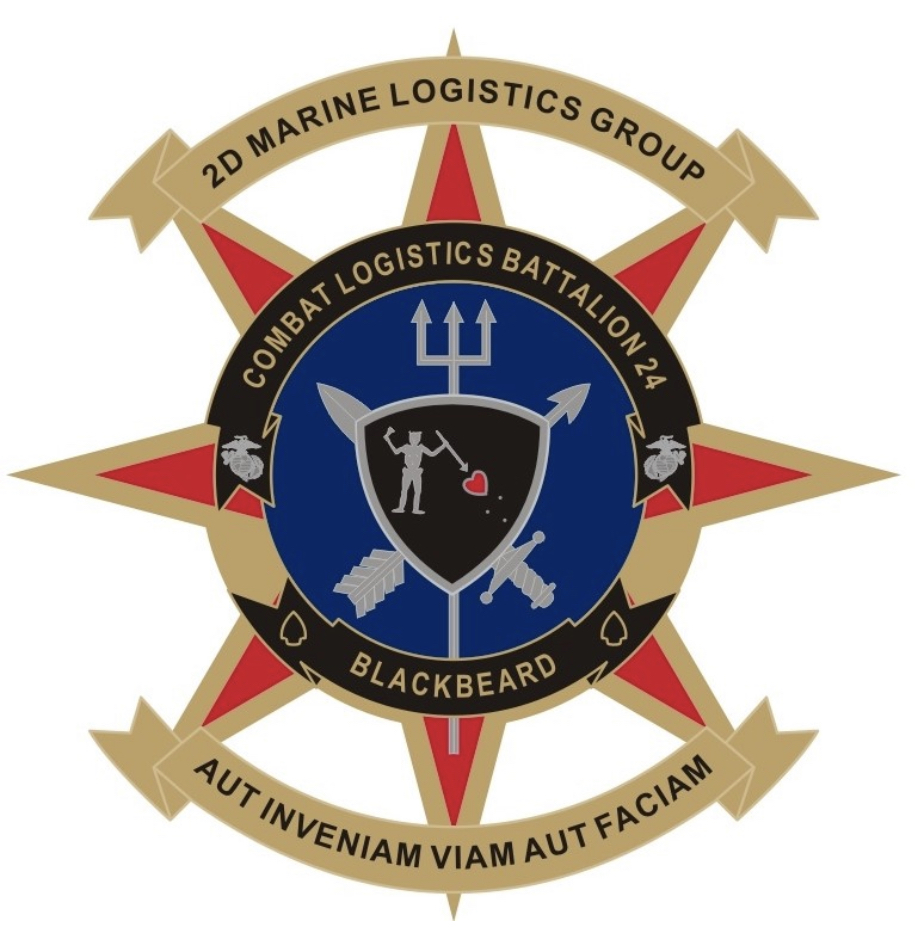
- CLB-24 insignia
- Founded: 1944
- Country: United States
- Branch: United States Marine Corps
- Type: Logistical unit
- Role: Logistical support
- Part of: 24th Marine Expeditionary Unit; 2nd Marine Logistics Group
- Garrison/HQ: Marine Corps Base Camp Lejeune
- Mottos: "Aut Inveniam Viam Aut Faciam" (Either Find a Way or Make One)
- Engagements: Persian Gulf War; Iraq War; War in Afghanistan

Commanders
- Current commander: LtCol Travis K. Chamberlin, USMC

Combat Logistics Battalion 24 (CLB 24) is a logistics battalion of the United States Marine Corps. They are part of Combat Logistics Regiment 2, 2nd Marine Logistics Group. The unit is based out of the Marine Corps Base Camp Lejeune, North Carolina and is in direct support of the 24th Marine Expeditionary Unit (24th MEU).

== Mission ==
The mission of CLB-24 is to provide timely, reliable, and continuous support to 24th MEU in support of the MEU commander's tactical mission and concept of operations; and to conduct, on order, Non-Combatant Evacuation Operations, Medical treatment and evacuation of casualties on a large scale, and Humanitarian Aid and Assistance operations.

== History ==
=== 1944–1949 ===
Activated 1 August 1944 at Oahu, Territory of Hawaii, as Headquarters Company, 8th Field Depot, Supply Service, Fleet Marine Force

Participated in the following World War II Campaign: Iwo Jima

Relocated during April 1945 to Hilo, Territory of Hawaii

Redesignated 1 June 1945 as Headquarters Company, Headquarters and Service Battalion, 8th Service Regiment, Service Command, Fleet Marine Force

Relocated during April 1945 to Sasebo, Japan

Relocated during August–September 1946 to Camp Lejeune, North Carolina, and reassigned to 2d Marine Division, Fleet Marine Force

Redesignated 15 December 1946 as Headquarters Company, Headquarters and Service Battalion, 2d Combat Service Group, Medium, 2d Marine Division, Fleet Marine Force

=== 1950–1959 ===
Redesignated 13 October 1950 as Headquarters and Service Battalion, 2d Combat Service Group, Service Command, Fleet Marine Force, Atlantic

Assigned 1 April 1951 to Force Troops, Fleet Marine Force, Atlantic

Redesignated 1 July 1956 as Headquarters and Service Battalion, 2d Combat Service Group, Force Troops, Fleet Marine Force, Atlantic

Redesignated 1 March 1957 as Headquarters and Service Battalion, 2d Force Service Regiment, Force Troops, Fleet Marine Force, Atlantic

=== 1960–1989 ===
Elements participated in the Cuban Missile Crisis, October–December 1962

Redesignated 1 October 1975 as Headquarters and Service Battalion, Force Troops/2d Force Service Support Group, Fleet Marine Force, Atlantic

Redesignated 30 June 1978 as Headquarters and Service Battalion, 2d Force Service Support Group, Fleet Marine Force, Atlantic

Element participated in operations in the Persian Gulf, April 1988

=== 1990–2004 ===
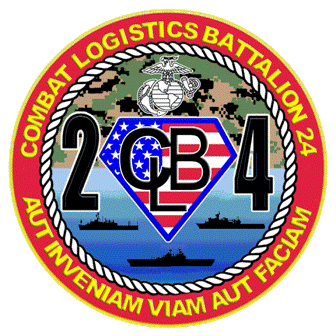
Seal during the 2000s

Participated in Operations Desert Shield and Desert Storm, Southwest Asia, as the Direct Support Command, 1st Force Service Support Group, December 1990 – March 1991

Elements participated in Haitian refugee operations, Cuba, November 1991 – April 1992, November 1992 – February 1993, and May–October 1994

Elements provided disaster relief support to Dade County, Florida, after Hurricane Andrew, September–October 1992

Elements participated in Operation Provide Promise, Bosnia, March–August 1994

Deployed during December 2002 to Kuwait in support of Operation Enduring Freedom

Participated in Operation Iraqi Freedom, Iraq, March–June 2003

CLB-24 is currently supporting 24th MEU operations.

=== 2008 ===
In February 2008, the CLB 24 began deploying its Marines to Kandahar, Afghanistan. They began their combat operations on April 15, 2008. CLB 24 made the initial push to FOB Bastion, In route they Hit a powerful improvised explosive device hidden in a culvert beneath the road detonated around midnight outside of Kandahar killing Battalion Sergeant Major, 1st Sgt. Luke J. Mercardante and Cpl. Kyle Wilks and Two other Marines were injured, one seriously. The blast gouged a hole 12 feet wide and 6 feet deep, stopping the convoy.

Canadian troops from a nearby outpost filled in the crater, allowing the convoy to get moving again to FOB Bastion. The Marines then pushed further into the Taliban stronghold to FOB Dyer and Garmsir, Helmand province around April 24.

This was the first major American operation in the region in years. By 1 June 2008, the Taliban were pushed out of Garmser. By mid-July, after a month and a half of heavy combat, the MEU was reporting that they had killed over 400 Taliban fighters in the Garmser area. Combat operations ended in September, 2008 and Marines started to return home by October, 2008.

Pushed Marines of Garmsir on 29 April in the first major American operation in the region in years. By 1 June 2008, the Taliban were pushed out of Garmser. By mid-July, after a month and a half of heavy combat, the Marines were reporting that they had killed over 400 Taliban fighters in the Garmser area.

== See also ==
- List of United States Marine Corps battalions
- Organization of the United States Marine Corps
