= 8th Engineer Support Battalion =

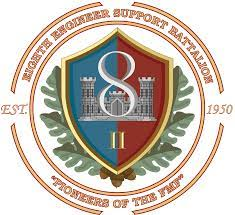
- Country: United States
- Allegiance: United States of America
- Branch: United States Marine Corps
- Role: Engineering support
- Part of: 2nd Marine Logistics Group; II Marine Expeditionary Force
- Garrison/HQ: Marine Corps Base Camp Lejeune
- Motto: "Pioneers of the FMF"
- Engagements: Operation Enduring Freedom; Operation Iraqi Freedom

Commanders
- Current commander: Lt. Col. William Riordon
- Notable commanders: Col Steve Cook

The 8th Engineer Support Battalion (8th ESB) is an engineering support unit of the United States Marine Corps and is headquartered at Marine Corps Base Camp Lejeune, North Carolina. The unit falls under the command of the 2nd Marine Logistics Group and the II Marine Expeditionary Force.

== Mission ==
To task organize forces in General Support to the MEF; providing mobility, counter-mobility, survivability, general engineering, and explosive ordnance disposal in order to ensure a maneuver and tempo advantage.

== Current units ==
The 8th Engineer Support Battalion consists of the following Companies

- Headquarters and Service Company
- Engineer Support Company
- Alpha Company
- Bravo Company
- Charlie Company
- 2nd Explosive Ordnance Disposal Company
- Bulk Fuel Company

== History ==
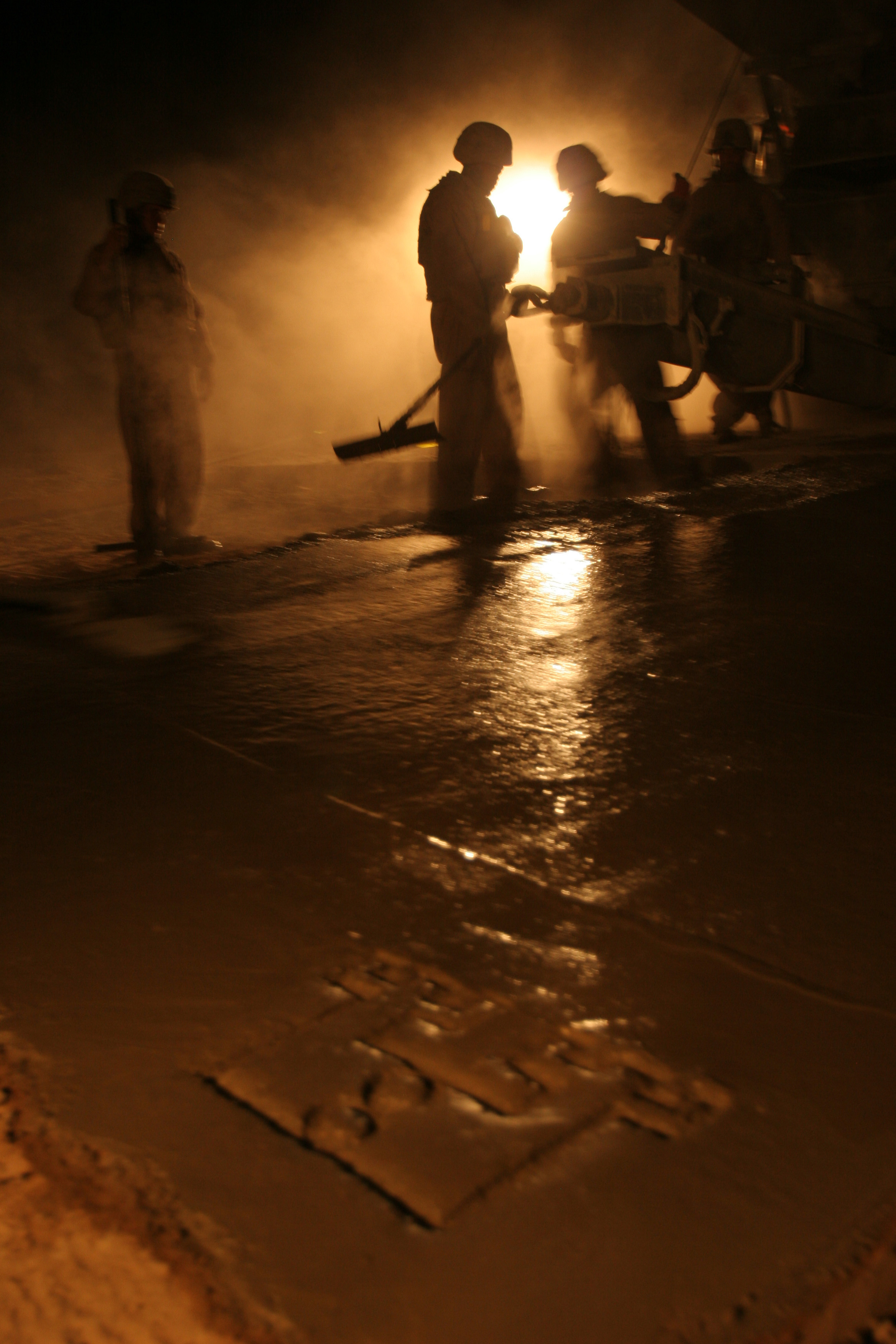
Marines of the 8th ESB work at night to lay concrete as they reconstruct a damaged section of road during a route repair mission in the Tharthar region of Al Anbar, Iraq. August 2007

=== 1950–1989 ===
Activated 11 December 1950 at Camp Geiger, North Carolina, as 8th Engineer Battalion, Fleet Marine Force, Atlantic, Relocated to Camp LeJeune, North Carolina in 1958

Assigned during September 1962 to Force Troops, Fleet Marine Force, Atlantic

Redesignated 1 January 1976 as 8th Engineer Support Battalion, Force Troops/ 2d Force Service Support Group, Fleet Marine Force, Atlantic

Provided combat service support to Marine Amphibious Units in the United States, Caribbean, and Mediterranean

Elements provided disaster relief support to Charleston, South Carolina, after Hurricane Hugo, September–October 1989

=== 1990–1999 ===
Participated in Operations Desert Shield and Desert Storm, Southwest Asia, December 1990 – April 1991

Elements participated in Haitian refugee operations, Cuba, November 1991 – October 1992

Elements provided disaster relief support to southern Florida after Hurricane Andrew, September–October 1992

Elements provided bridging support to the State of Florida, Volusia County, during wildfires, July 1998.

Elements provided disaster relief support to Puerto Rico after Hurricane Georges, September–November 1998 (CSSD-68)

Elements provided disaster relief support to Honduras, El Salvador, Nicaragua, and Guatemala after Hurricane Mitch, November 1998 – April 1999 (CSSD-69)

=== 2000–2010 ===
Deployed during February 2003 to Kuwait in support of Operation Enduring Freedom Participated in Operation Iraqi Freedom, Iraq, March–May 2003

Elements participated in Operation Secure Tomorrow, Haiti, February–June 2004

Elements returned to Iraq in February 2004 for continued operations in Operation Iraqi Freedom 2–1.

Elements participated in Operation Iraqi Freedom, Iraq, January 2005 – March 2006

Participated in Operation Iraqi Freedom, Iraq, March–October 2007

Participated in Operation Enduring Freedom, Afghanistan, February 2008

Elements participated in Operation Unified Response, Haiti, January–March 2010

Participated in Operation Enduring Freedom, Afghanistan, November 2010 – June 2011

== See also ==
- List of United States Marine Corps battalions
- Organization of the United States Marine Corps
