= Combat Logistics Regiment 27 =

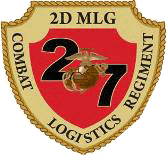
- Country: United States
- Allegiance: United States of America
- Branch: United States Marine Corps
- Type: Logistics
- Part of: 2nd Marine Logistics Group; II Marine Expeditionary Force
- Garrison/HQ: Marine Corps Base Camp Lejeune
- Motto: Warriors sustaining warriors
- Engagements: Operation Iraqi Freedom

Commanders
- Current commander: Col Melissa D. Chestnut

Combat Logistics Regiment 27 (CLR 27) is a logistics regiment based at Marine Corps Base Camp Lejeune, North Carolina and falls under the command of the 2nd Marine Logistics Group (2nd MLG) and the II Marine Expeditionary Force (II MEF), United States Marine Corps.

== Current mission ==
Serve as a Logistics Combat Element (LCE) headquarters for the Marine Air Ground Task Force (MAGTF), provide the initial command and control functions for the MAGTF in the arrival and assembly area. Provide the LCE for Marine Expeditionary Units (MEU) IOT provide sustained tactical logistics and engineering support to the MAGTF.”

== Subordinate units ==
As of May 2024, Combat Logistics Regiment 27 consists of Combat Logistics Battalion 22, Combat Logistics Battalion 24, Combat Logistics Battalion 26, 8th Engineer Support Battalion, and Headquarters Company which contains the regimental staff, Regimental Commanding Officer, Regimental Executive Officer, and Regimental Sergeant Major.

== History ==
The unit was activated 1 August 1944 at Pearl Harbor as Headquarters and Service Battalion, 8th Field Depot, Supply Service, Fleet Marine Force, under the commanding officer 2ndLt Gordon McPherson. The unit participated in the Volcano and Ryukyu Islands campaign, most notably, the Battle of Iwo Jima from 19 February to 26 March 1945 providing logistics support to Marines on the front line. In April 1945, it was relocated to Hilo, Hawaii. The following September, the unit was reassigned to the 2nd Marine Division, and moved to Marine Corps Base Camp Lejeune, its current home. On 13 October 1950 it was re-designated as Headquarters and Service Battalion.

On 1 April 1951, the unit was reassigned to Fleet Marine Force, Atlantic, as a part of Force Service Regiment. Personnel and equipment from the battalion participated in the landings of the 1958 Lebanon crisis, and also provided support to mobilized troops during the Cuban Missile Crisis in late 1962.

The unit provided relief in autumn 1989 to South Carolina and Puerto Rico in the aftermath of Hurricane Hugo. A month later, elements of the battalion would participate in the United States invasion of Panama. The following year, the unit would deploy to the Middle East for the Gulf War, remaining for Operation Provide Comfort until July 1991. From November 1991 to October 1994, the group supported Haitian refugee operations after the 1991 Haitian coup d'état. Disaster relief efforts from the unit supported Miami-Dade County, Florida after Hurricane Andrew in late 1992, then elements participated in Operation Provide Promise in Bosnia and Herzegovina in the summer of 1994.

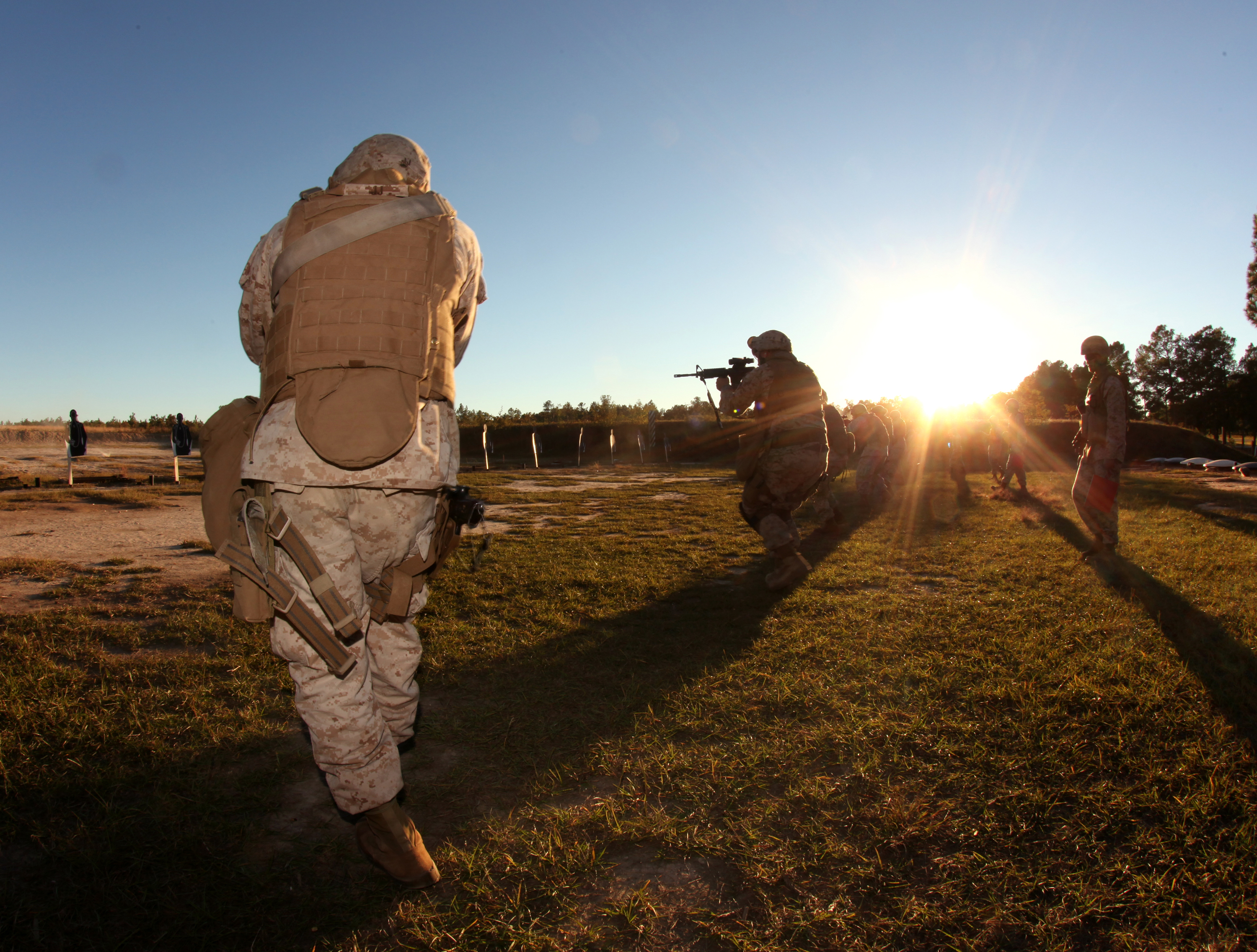
Marines from Combat Logistics Battalion 22 practice fire techniques

In December 2002, the unit was sent to Kuwait for more local support, and would then participate in the 2003 invasion of Iraq and subsequent Iraq War. On 21 April 2006, the battalion was re-designated as Combat Logistics Regiment 27, 2d Marine Logistics Regiment. The regiment provided personnel and equipment for year-long deployment tours to support Multi-National Forces West in Al Anbar Governorate. The final deployment as a regiment was in Al Taqaddum where the unit served as 2d Marine Logistics Regiment Headquarters element, and the unit deployed for its last Iraq tour in January 2009.

On 1 August 2014 the regiment was re-designated as Headquarters Regiment, and then was re-designated back to Combat Logistics Regiment 27 (CLR 27) on 1 October 2018. Currently, CLR 27 supports 2d MLG and II MEF in global expeditionary operations.

== Commanding officers ==
Commanding Officers, 8th Field Depot, Headquarters and Service Bn 2D FSSG, CLR 27, HQ Reg 2D MLG

2ndLt Godon Mcpherson 1 Aug 1944 - 29 Apr 1945

1stLt Louis A. Sullivan 30 Apr 1945 - 31 May 1945

LtCol James F. Sherman 1 Jun 1945 - 28 Aug 1945

Maj William H. McCormich 29 Aug 1945 - 19 Nov 1945

Maj Joseph T. Smith 20 Nov 1945 - 6 Aug 1946

LtCol Robert E. Stannah 7 Aug 1946 - 29 Oct 1946

Capt Oscar W. Cargile 20 Oct 1946 - 14 Dec 1946

Maj Arthur J. Barret 15 Dec 1946 - 19 Jun 1947

Maj Lewis D. Baughman 20 Jun 1947- 16 Aug 1947

LtCol John A McAdister 17 Aug 1947 - 16 Sep 1947

Maj Julian V. Lyon 17 Sep 1947 - 11 Jan 1948

Maj John R. Barriero 12 Jan 1948 - 18 Mar 1948

LtCol Maurice T. Ireland 19 Mar 1948 - 22 Jul 1948

LtCol Frances C. Clagett 23 Jul 1948 - 31 Oct 1948

Maj Richard W. Schutt 1 Nov 1948 - 29 Jul 1949

Maj Wilbert T. Shafer 30 Jul 1949 - 24 Oct 1949

1stLt Frederick S. Thomas 25 Oct 1949 - 4 Mar 1950

Redesignated as Headquarters and Service Battalion on 13 Oct 1950

1stLt George D. Mooer 5 Mar 1950 - 1 Jan 1951

Maj Wilbert T. Shafer 2 Jan 1950 - 28 May 1951

Maj Frederick D. Cortner 29 May 1951 - 20 Jan 1952

1stLt William F. Russel, Jr. 21 Jan 1952 - 13 Mar 1952

LtCol Walter S. Haskell, Jr. 14 Mar 1952 - 8 Apr 1953

Maj Robert J. Kash, Jr. 9 Apr 1953 - 23 Sep 1953

LtCol Theodore P. Watson 24 Sep 1953 - 20 Nov 1953

LtCol Walter S. Haskell 21 Nov 1953 - 29 Nov 1953

Maj William R. Popke 30 Nov 1953 - 15 Feb 1954

Maj Robert J. Kash, Jr. 16 Feb 1954 - 10 Dec 1955

Maj Wilbur J. Buss 11 Dec 1955 - 8 Jan 1956

Maj Victor E. Wade 17 Feb 1956 - 12 May 1958

LtCol William L. Batchelor 13 May 1958 - 28 Oct 1959

LtCol Russell E. McCreery 29 Oct 1959 - 7 Jun 1960

Maj George M. Faser 8 Jun 1960 - 18 Mar 1961

Maj Thomas O. Weghorst 18 Mar 1961 - 1 Jun 1961

Maj Junius M. Lowder 2 Jun 1961 - 26 Oct 1962

LtCol Edward L. Roberts 27 Oct 1962 - 27 Jul 1963

Maj Leonar Schoenberger 28 Jul 1963 - 2 Sep 1963

LtCol Frederick A. Quint 3 Sep 1963 - 30 Jun 1965

LtCol Clifford J. Peabody 1 Jul 1965 - 4 Mar 1966

LtCol Harry D. Woods 5 Mar 1966 - 25 Jun 1967

Maj Donald O. Coughlin 26 Jun 1967 - 6 Jul 1967

Maj Ronald L. Payne 7 Jul 1967 - 20 Jul 1967

Maj Charles L. McElheny 21 Jul 1967 - 26 Nov 1967

LtCol James H. Landers 27 Nov 1967 - 24 Jun 1968

Maj Warren H. Day 25 Jun 1968 - 7 Oct 1968

LtCol John W. Wiita 18 Feb 1968 - 18 Dec 1970

LtCol John B. Cantieny 19 Dec 1970 - 30 Sep 1971

LtCol Ralph Fortie 1 Oct 1971 - 25 Jul 1972

Maj Malcome G. Gregory 26 Jul 1972 - 10 Sep 1972

LtCol J. B. Harris 11 Sep 1972 - 28 Jun 1973

Maj Robert E. Burgess 29 Jun 1973 - 31 Jul 1973

LtCol Roy M. Marks 1 Aug 1973 - 20 Dec 1974

Maj Donald E. Sudduth 21 Dec 1974 - 31 Dec 1975

LtCol Cleo P. Stapleton, Jr. 1 Feb 1975 - 20 Aug 1976

Maj Robert D. Dasch 21 Aug 1976 - 26 Aug 1976

LtCol "Billy" W. Adams 27 Aug 1976 - 12 Jul 1978

Maj James P. Crowley 13 Jul 1978 - 12 Sep 1978

LtCol George R. Griggs 13 Sep 1978 - 12 Sep 1978

LtCol Richard S. Pyne 10 Jan 1980 - *(as of 31 Dec 1980)

LtCol George E. Turner, Jr. *(as of 1 Jan 1982) - 10 Jun 1982

LtCol Frederick W. Beekman III 11 Jun 1982 - *( as of 31 Dec 1982)

Lt Col William C. Shaver *(as of 1 Jan 1984) - 27 Jun 1985

LtCol Ronald D. Sortino 28 Jun 1985 - 27 May 1987

Col Robert R. Green 28 May 1987 - 22 Apr 1988

LtCol Michael G. Roth 23 Apr 1988 - *( as of 31 Dec 1989)

LtCol James E. Vesley *(Unk) - 2 Jul 1991

LtCol George E. Holmes 3 Jul 1991 - 25 Jun 1992

LtCol James E. Hull 26 Jun 1992 - 8 Jun 1993

LtCol Robert C. Dickerson 9 Jun 1993 - 17 Nov 1994

LtCol Andrew J. Peters 18 Nov 1994 - 6 Jun 1996

LtCol M. Wayne Phillips 7 Jun 1996 - 31 Aug 1997

Col M. Wayne Philips 1 Sep 1998 - 26 Jun 1998

LtCol Jeffrey D. Everest 27 Jun 1998 - 15 Jun 2000

LtCol Richard E. Smith 16 June 2000 - 14 June 2002

LtCol Craig C. Crenshaw 15 Jun 2002 - 29 Jun 2004

LtCol John R. Gambrino 30 Jun 2004 - 14 Jan 2005

LtCol David M. Smith 15 Jan 2005 - 21 Apr 2006

Redesignated as Combat Logistics Regiment 27, 2D Marine Logistics Regiment on 21 April 2006

Col William M. Faulkner 21 Apr 2006- 31 Aug 2006

Col David M. Smith 1 Sep 2006 - 3 Mar 2008

Col William M. Faulkner 3 Mar 2008 - 28 Mar 2008

Col Vincent A. Coglianese 28 Mar 2008 - 9 Jan 2009

Col Douglas C. Linden 10 Jan 2009 - 24 Nov 2009

Col Brian T. Oliver 24 Nov 2009 - 5 Jan 2010

Col Vincent A. Coglianese 6 Jan 2010 - 14 Jun 2010

Col Mark R. Hollahan 14 Jun 2010 - 30 Nov 2010

LtCol Gary Keim 1 Dec 2010 - 22 Mar 2011

Col Gary Keim 23 Mar 2011 - 30 Sep 2011

LtCol Kevin G. Collins 1 Oct 2011 - 31 Dec 2011

LtCol Christopher G. Downs 1 Jan 2012 - 19 Mar 2012

Col Mark R. Hollahan 19 Mar 2012 - 14 Dec 2012

Col Gary F. Keim 14 Dec 2012-

Redesignated as Headquarters Regiment, 2D Marine Logistics Group on 1 Aug 2014. Redesignated as Combat Logistics Regiment 27, 2D Marine Logistics Group 1 Oct 2018

Col Neibel

Col B. A. Miller

Col Brian W. Mullery

Col Lauren S. Edwards

Col Daniel Coleman 5 May 23 - 29 Jun 23

Col Melissa D. Chestnut 29 Jun 23 - present

== See also ==
- List of United States Marine Corps regiments
- Organization of the United States Marine Corps
