= 2nd Dental Battalion =

U.S. Navy battalion supporting the U.S. Marine Corps

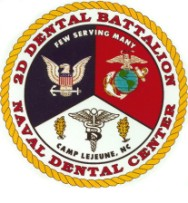
- 2nd Dental Battalion's emblem
- Active: N/A
- Country: United States
- Branch: USN & USMC
- Type: Medical
- Role: Ensure dental readiness
- Part of: 2nd Marine Logistics Group; II Marine Expeditionary Force (Bureau of Medicine and Surgery)
- Garrison/HQ: Marine Corps Base Camp Lejeune, North Carolina
- Motto(s): "Few Serving Many"
- Engagements: Operation Iraqi Freedom

Commanders
- Current commander: CAPT Nadjmeh Hariri

2nd Dental Battalion (2nd Den Bn) is unit of the United States Navy that supports United States Marine Corps forces. The battalion includes ten dental clinics and annexes spread throughout North Carolina. The unit is based out of Marine Corps Base Camp Lejeune and falls under the command of the 2nd Marine Logistics Group and the II Marine Expeditionary Force. The current commander is Captain Nadjmeh "Nadji" Hariri.

== Mission ==
Dental force health protection of Marines and Sailors of II MEF, Marine Corps Base Camp Lejeune, Marine Corps Air Bases East and tenant commands.

== History ==
Activated 1 October 1979 at Camp Lejeune, North Carolina, as 2d Dental Battalion, 2d Force Service Support Group, Fleet Marine Force, Atlantic

Elements participated in Operations Desert Shield and Desert Storm, Southwest Asia, August 1990-April 1991

Fleet Marine Force, Atlantic redesignated 31 July 1992 as U.S. Marine Corps Forces, Atlantic

Detachments participated in support of Operation Uphold Democracy, Haiti, September 1994-March 1995

Redesignated during January 1996 as 2d Dental Battalion/Naval Dental Center, 2d Force Service Support Group, U.S. Marine Corps Forces, Atlantic

U.S. Marine Corps Forces, Atlantic predestinated 30 December 2005 as U.S. Marine Corps Forces Command

Elements participated in Operation Iraqi Freedom, Iraq, 2003-2008

The 2nd Dental Battalion runs dental clinics and annexes on MCB Camp Lejeune, including French Creek, Mainside, as well as satellite facilities such as Camp Johnson and Camp Geiger. The battalion also provides dental services at Marine Corps Air Station Cherry Point and Marine Corps Air Station New River.

== Personnel ==
- Navy Dental Corps

== See also ==
- History of the United States Marine Corps
- List of United States Marine Corps battalions
