= 2nd Medical Battalion =

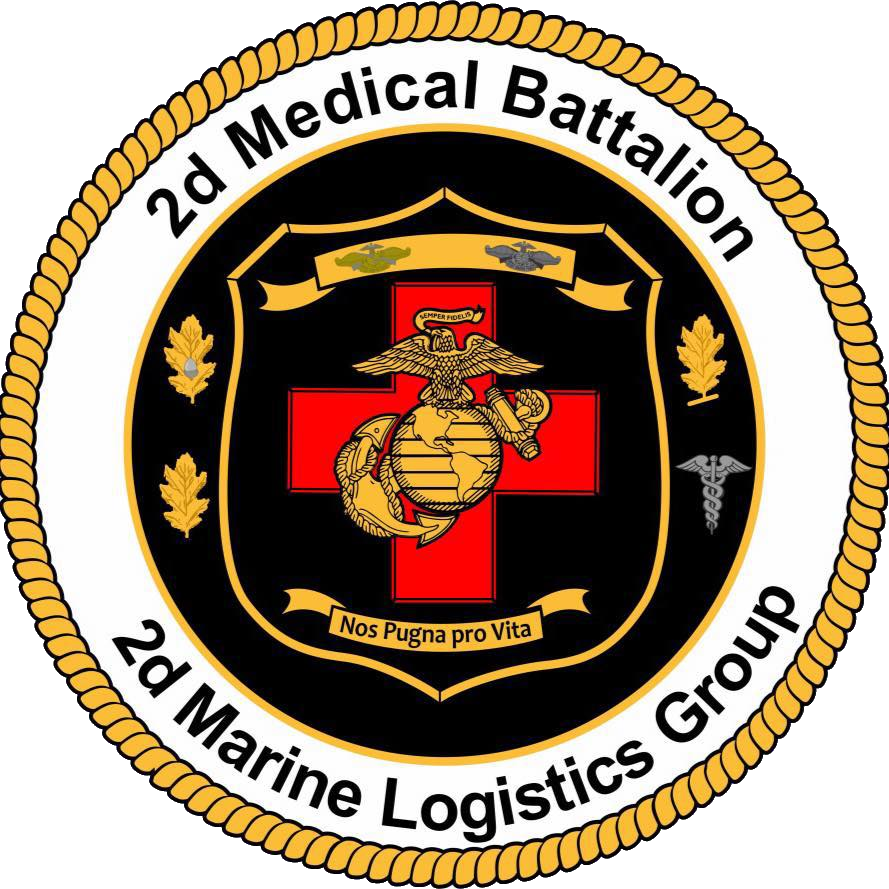
- 2nd Medical Battalion's seal
- Country: United States
- Branch: United States Marine Corps
- Type: Logistics unit
- Role: Medical support
- Part of: 2nd Marine Logistics Group
- Garrison/HQ: Marine Corps Base Camp Lejeune
- Motto(s): "Nos Pugna Pro Vita"

The 2nd Medical Battalion (2D MED BN) is a medical support unit of the United States Marine Corps and that is headquartered at Marine Corps Base Camp Lejeune, North Carolina. The unit falls under the 2nd Marine Logistics Group (2nd MLG).

== Current units ==
- Headquarters and Service Company (HSC)
- Alpha Surgical Company (A Company)
- Bravo Surgical Company (B Company)

== Mission ==
The 2nd Medical Battalion's task is to provide medical support to II MEF during combat operations and be prepared to deploy on short notice into any environment.

== See also ==
- History of the United States Marine Corps
- List of United States Marine Corps battalions
- Organization of the United States Marine Corps
