= Combat Logistics Battalion 26 =

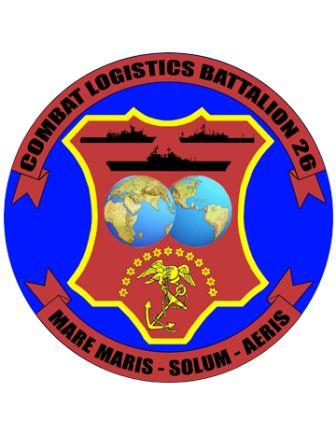
- CLB-26 insignia
- Country: United States
- Allegiance: United States of America
- Branch: United States Marine Corps
- Type: Logistics
- Part of: 26th Marine Expeditionary Unit; 2nd Marine Logistics Group
- Garrison/HQ: Marine Corps Base Camp Lejeune
- Nickname: The Sentinels
- Motto: "Mare Maris-Solum-Aeris"
- Engagements: Operation Desert Storm; Operation Iraqi Freedom

Commanders
- Current commander: LtCol Zach Embers

Combat Logistics Battalion 26 (CLB-26) is a logistics battalion of the United States Marine Corps. They are part of Combat Logistics Regiment 2 and the 2nd Marine Logistics Group. The unit is based out of the Marine Corps Base Camp Lejeune, North Carolina and is in direct support of the 26th Marine Expeditionary Unit (26th MEU).

== Mission ==
Provide timely, reliable, and continuous combat logistics support to all elements of the 26th MEU.

== Subordinate units ==
- Engineer Platoon
- Explosive Ordnance Disposal
- Landing Support Platoon
- Maintenance Platoon
- Health Service Support Platoon
- Motor Transportation Platoon
- Supply Platoon
- Distribution Liaison Cell

== History ==
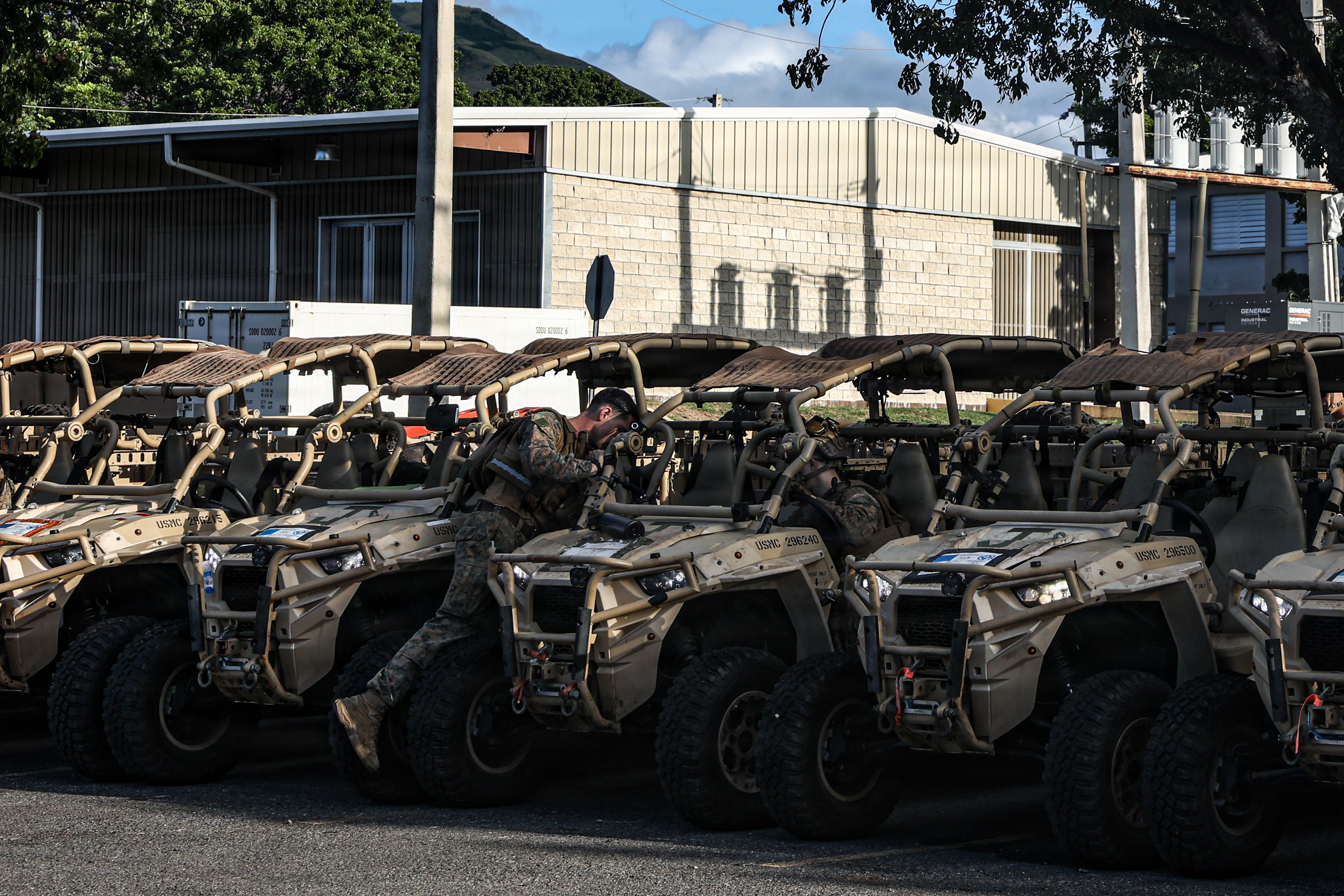
CLB-26 Utility Task Vehicles prior to convoy route reconnaissance in Camp Santiago, Puerto Rico during Operation Southern Spear, December 10, 2025

== See also ==
- List of United States Marine Corps battalions
