= Combat Logistics Battalion 22 =

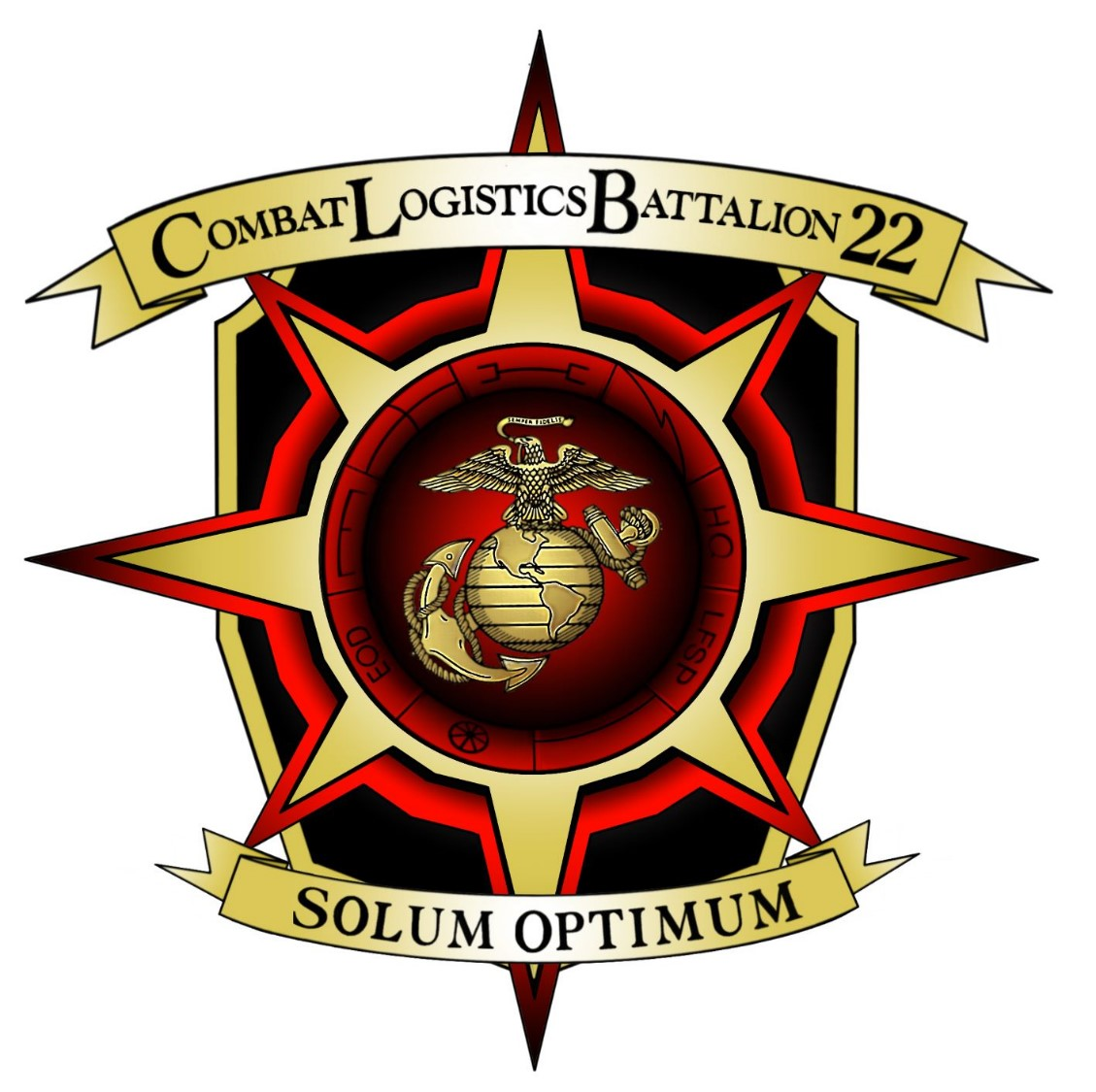
- Combat Logistics Battalion 22 Unit Crest
- Country: United States
- Branch: USMC
- Type: Logistics
- Part of: 26th Marine Expeditionary Unit; 2nd Marine Logistics Group
- Garrison/HQ: Marine Corps Base Camp Lejeune
- Nickname: Optimus
- Motto: "Only The Best"
- Engagements: Operation Desert Storm; Operation Iraqi Freedom

Commanders
- Current commander: LtCol Eric Albin
- Notable commanders: Sean P. Mullen; William P. Carroll; Anthony Ansley II; Colter J. Bahlau (first Combat Engineer Officer)

Combat Logistics Battalion 22 (CLB-22) is a logistics battalion of the United States Marine Corps. They are part of Combat Logistics Regiment 27 and the 2nd Marine Logistics Group. The unit is based out of Marine Corps Base Camp Lejeune, North Carolina and is in direct support of the 22nd Marine Expeditionary Unit (22nd MEU).

== Mission ==
Provide the MEU with mission-essential combat service support to ensure readiness, sustainment, and mission capability are achieved and maintained.

== Subordinate units ==
- Engineer Platoon
- Explosive Ordnance Disposal
- Landing Support Platoon
- Maintenance Platoon
- Health Service Support Platoon
- Motor Transportation Platoon
- Supply Platoon
- Distribution Liaison Cell

== History ==
The unit currently known as CLB-22 traces its history back to Combat Service Support Detachment 23 (CSSD-23), the unit that for years provided combat service support to the 32nd and then 22nd MAUs. In 1986, the unit received the designation as MEU Service Support Group 22 and has a history that parallels that of the 22nd MEU.

In the fall of 1990, shortly after the 22d MEU's deployment to Liberia where they evacuated more than 2,300 civilians from the war-torn country, MSSG-22 was deployed to Southwest Asia where it served as CSSD-22 during Operation Desert Storm.

In 2003, because of the deployment of the 2nd Force Service Support Group to southwest Asia for Operation Iraqi Freedom, a unique allocation of forces proved necessary to staff MSSG-22 for its 2004 deployment with the 22nd MEU. For that deployment, and for the first time in history, a Marine Wing Support Squadron (MWSS) from MCAS Cherry Point was redesignated as an MSSG and deployed with the 22nd MEU.

Recently, the unit has been redesignated as Combat Logistics Battalion 22.

== See also ==
- Organization of the United States Marine Corps
- List of United States Marine Corps battalions
