= 2nd Combat Readiness Regiment =

2d Combat Readiness Regiment
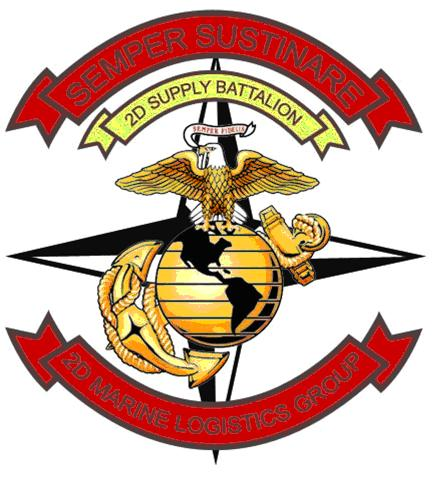
- 2nd Supply Battalion insignia
- Country: United States
- Branch: USMC
- Part of: 2nd Marine Logistics Group
- Garrison/HQ: Marine Corps Base Camp Lejeune
- Motto: "Semper Sustinare"

Commanders
- Current commander: Col. Aaron C. Norwood

The 2d Combat Readiness Regiment is a Regiment of the United States Marine Corps that specializes in distributing and warehousing military goods and equipment. They are based out of Marine Corps Base Camp Lejeune, North Carolina and they fall under the 2nd Marine Logistics Group.

== Subordinate units ==
- Headquarters and Service Company
- 2nd Maintenance Battalion
- Ammunition Company
- Supply Company
- Medical Logistics Company

== History ==
Activated 26 May 2005 at Marine Corps Base Camp Lejeune, North Carolina, as Combat Logistics Regiment 25 and assigned to the 2nd Marine Logistics Group. Elements of the battalion participated in Operation Iraqi Freedom, Iraq, from February 2007 through January 2008.

== See also ==
- History of the United States Marine Corps
- List of United States Marine Corps battalions
