= 2nd Marine Logistics Group =

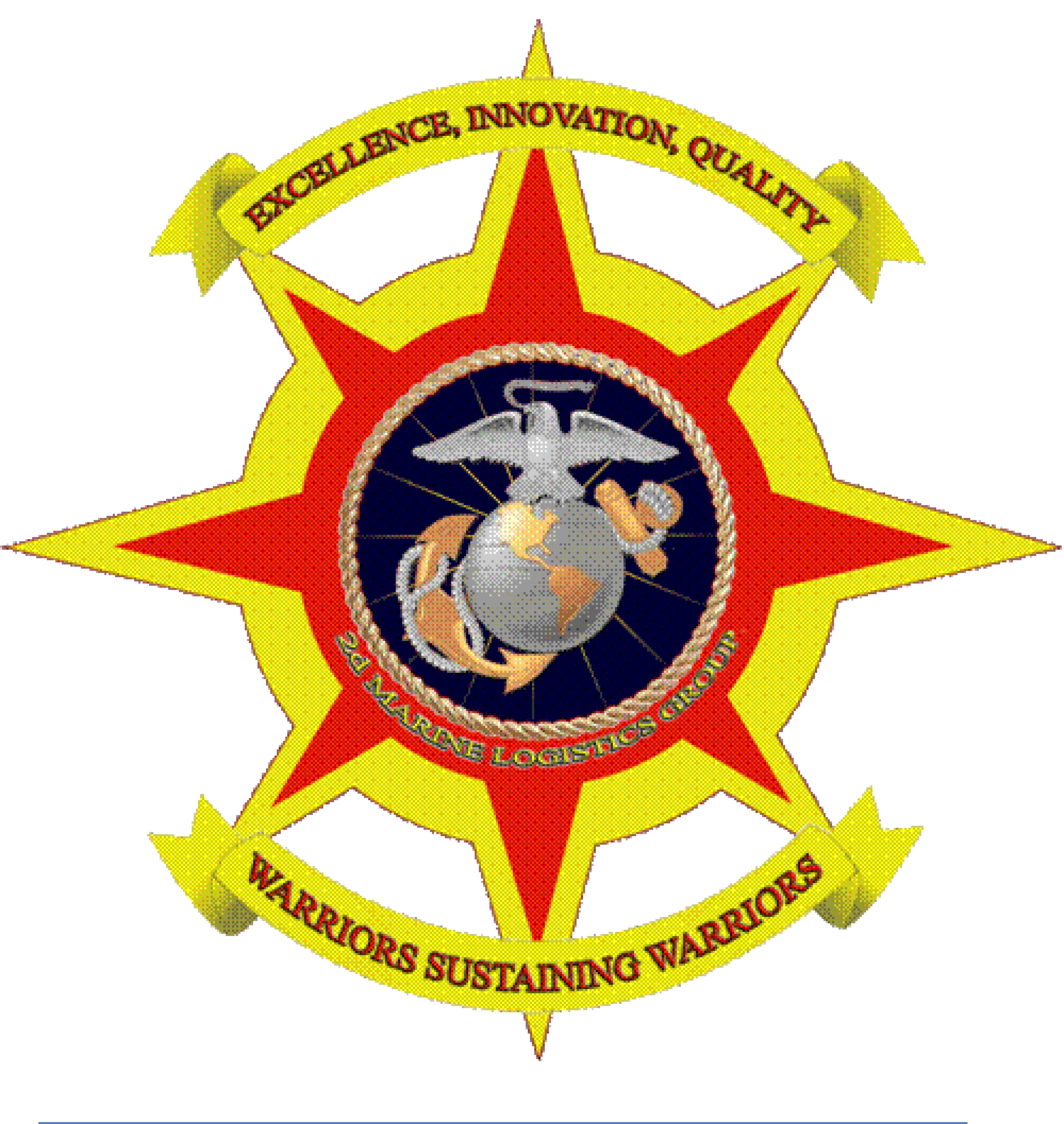
- 2nd Marine Logistics Group
- Founded: 1 August 1944
- Country: United States
- Branch: United States Marine Corps
- Part of: II Marine Expeditionary Force
- Garrison/HQ: Marine Corps Base Camp Lejeune
- Mottos: "Excellence, Innovation, Quality – You Will Never Fight Alone"
- Engagements: World War II * Battle of Iwo Jima; Gulf War; Operation Provide Promise

Commanders
- Current commander: Brigadier General Maura M. Hennigan
- Notable commanders: John H. Griebel; John H. Miller

The 2nd Marine Logistics Group (2nd MLG) is a logistics unit of the United States Marine Corps and is headquartered at Marine Corps Base Camp Lejeune, North Carolina. 2nd MLG was formerly known as 2nd Force Service Support Group (FSSG) and was reorganized with its sister FSSGs into Marine Logistics Groups on November 9, 2005. This change was part of a larger realignment of the Marine Corps' combat service support units, which saw all FSSGs renamed to MLGs. The 2nd MLG is composed of approximately 8,000 Marines and sailors.

== Organization ==
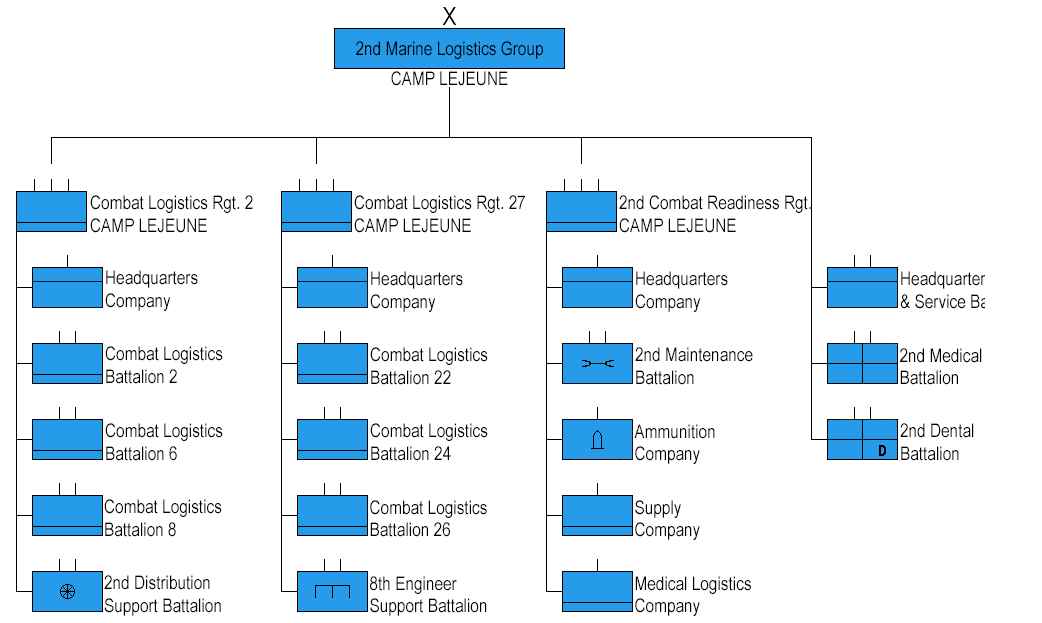
2nd Marine Logistics Group organization as of May 2026 (click to enlarge)

- Headquarters and Service Battalion
- Combat Logistics Regiment 2
- Combat Logistics Regiment 27
- 2nd Combat Readiness Regiment
- 2nd Dental Battalion
- 2nd Medical Battalion

=== Former units ===
- Headquarters Regiment
- Combat Logistics Regiment 25

== Mission ==
Conduct combat logistics operations in support of II Marine Expeditionary Force (MEF) and attached/assigned forces in order to support and conduct combat operations and sustain warfighting effectiveness. Provide general support (GS) combat logistics to all forces operating in the MEF battlespace.

== History ==
The unit was activated 1 August 1944 at Pearl Harbor as 8th Field Depot, Supply Service, Fleet Marine Force. After participating in the Volcano and Ryukyu Islands campaign, the Battle of Iwo Jima from 19 February to 26 March 1945. in April 1945, it was relocated to Hilo, Hawaii, and redesignated on 1 June as 8th Service Regiment, Service Command. The following September, the unit was reassigned to the 2nd Marine Division, and moved to Marine Corps Base Camp Lejeune, its current home. On 15 October 1946 it was redesignated as 2nd Combat Service Group, Medium, then reassigned to Service Command on 17 April 1947.

On 1 April 1951, the unit was reassigned to Fleet Marine Force, Atlantic. The "Medium" modifier to the unit's designation was dropped on 1 July 1956, and again renamed to Force Service Regiment on 1 March 1957. Elements of the regiment participated in the landings of the 1958 Lebanon crisis, and also provided support to mobilized troops during the Cuban Missile Crisis in late 1962. After participating in the United States occupation of the Dominican Republic in 1965, the unit was renamed 2nd Service Support Group on 1 October 1975. The Marines returned to Lebanon in August 1982 as part of the Multinational Force in Lebanon during the Lebanese Civil War, and remained until February 1984.

The unit was redesignated on 30 June 1978 as 2nd Force Service Support Group, and would provide relief that autumn to South Carolina and Puerto Rico in the aftermath of Hurricane Hugo. A month later, elements of the group would participate in the United States invasion of Panama. The following year, the unit would deploy to the Middle East for the Gulf War, remaining for Operation Provide Comfort until July 1991. From November 1991 to October 1994, the group supported Haitian refugee operations after the 1991 Haitian coup d'état. Disaster relief efforts from the unit supported Miami-Dade County, Florida after Hurricane Andrew in late 1992, then elements participated in Operation Provide Promise in Bosnia and Herzegovina in the summer of 1994.

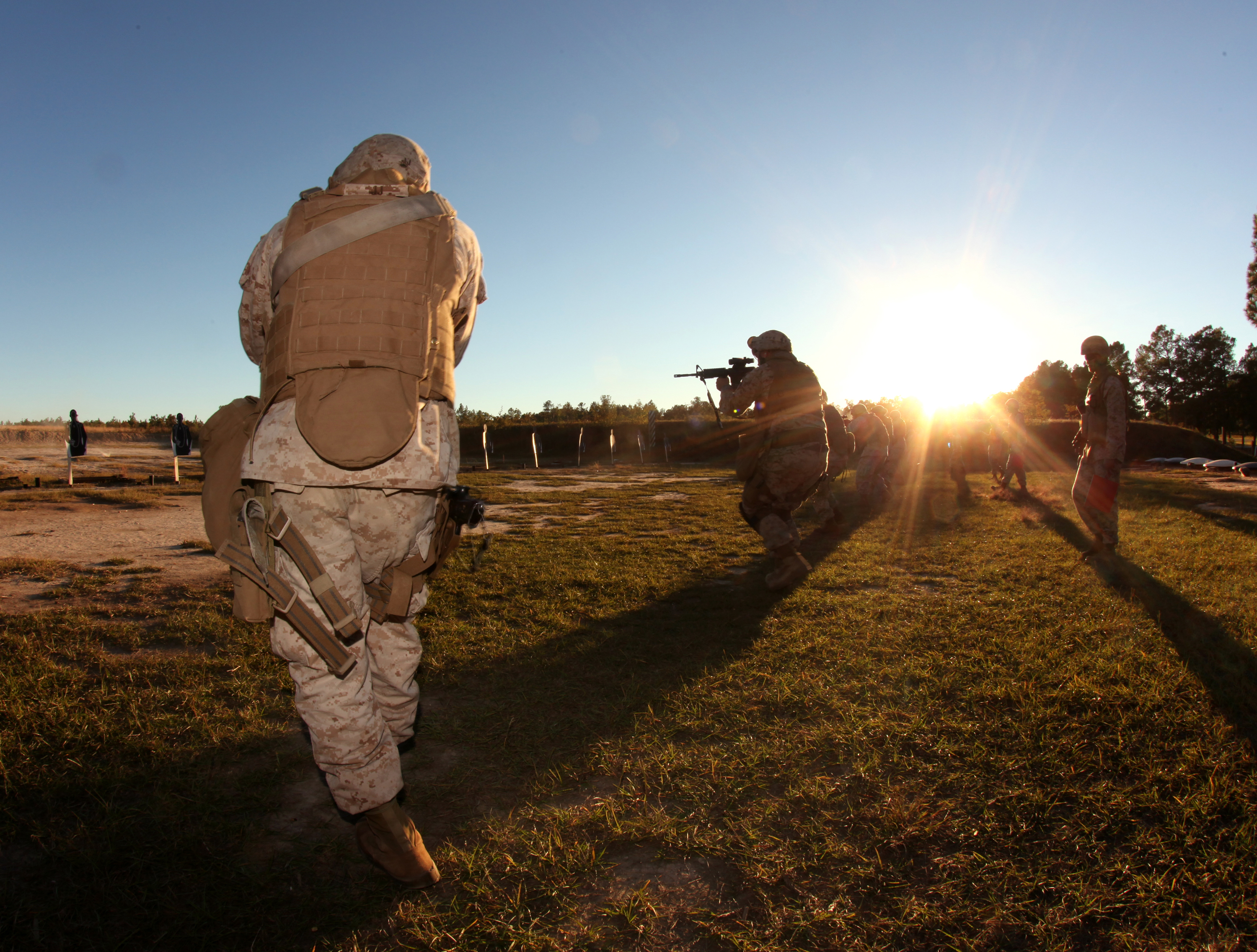
Marines from Combat Logistics Battalion 22 practice fire techniques

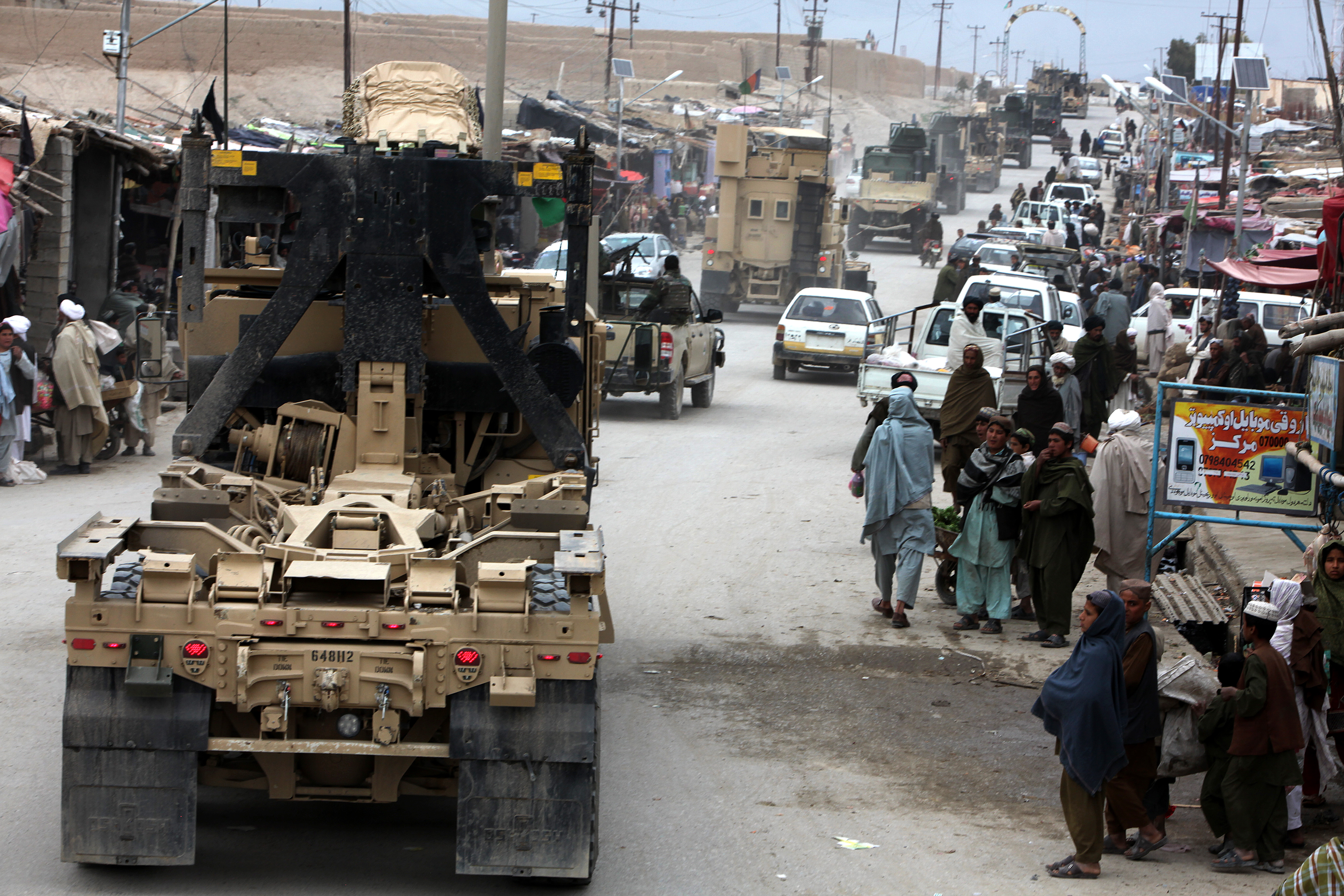
Marines conduct a combat logistics patrol (CLP) in Helmand province, Afghanistan, 2013

With the advent of the War in Afghanistan, elements were sent to Guantanamo Bay Naval Base in Cuba in early 2002 to establish more permanent facilities for the Guantanamo Bay detention camp. That December, the unit was sent to Kuwait for more local support, and would then participate in the 2003 invasion of Iraq and subsequent Iraq War. The group would deploy for year-long tours to support Multi-National Forces West in Al Anbar Governorate, alternating with 1st Marine Logistics Group. Headquartered at Al Taqaddum, the unit deployed for its last Iraq tour in January 2009.

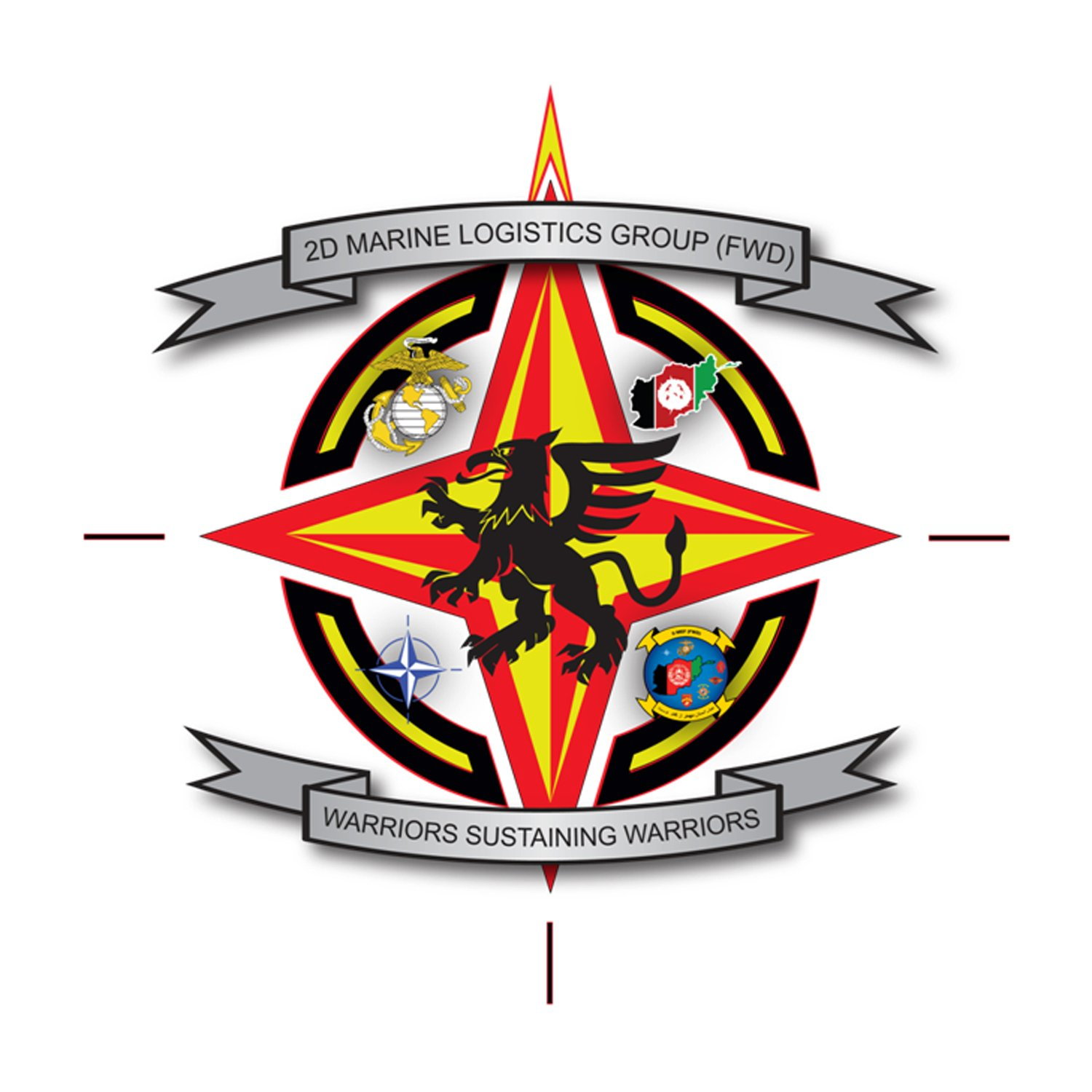
Current 2nd Marine Logistics Group (Forward) Logo

The 2nd Marine Logistics Group completed a yearlong deployment in February 2012 in support of the International Security Assistance Force in Afghanistan, where they were replaced by the 1st Marine Logistics Group.

In January 2013, the 2nd Marine Logistics Group deployed Combat Logistics Regiment 2 to Afghanistan in support of International Security Assistance Forces.

== See also ==
- Organization of the United States Marine Corps
- List of United States Marine Corps logistics groups
