= General Seitz =

General Seitz may refer to:

- John F. R. Seitz (1908–1978), U.S. Army major general
- John A. Seitz (1908–1987), U.S. Army brigadier general
- Richard J. Seitz (1918–2013), U.S. Army lieutenant general
