= XVIII Airborne Corps =

Corps of the United States Army

- Shoulder sleeve insignia
- Active: 14 January 1942–15 October 1945; 21 May 1951–present
- Country: United States of America
- Branch: United States Army
- Type: Airborne
- Role: Headquarters
- Size: Corps
- Part of: U.S. Army Western Hemisphere Command
- Garrison/HQ: Fort Bragg, North Carolina, U.S.
- Motto: Sky Dragons
- Color of Beret: Maroon
- Engagements: World War II; Rhineland; Ardennes-Alsace; Central Europe; Armed Forces Expeditions; Dominican Republic; Grenada; Panama; Southwest Asia; Defense of Saudi Arabia; Liberation and Defense of Kuwait; Global War on Terrorism; Afghanistan; Iraq; Operation Inherent Resolve
- Website: home.army.mil/bragg/index.php/units-tenants/xviii-airborne-co

Commanders
- Current commander: LTG Gregory K. Anderson
- Notable commanders: Matthew Ridgway; John W. Leonard; James J. Lindsay; Thomas J. H. Trapnell; William C. Westmoreland; John W. Bowen; Henry E. Emerson; Hugh Shelton; Lloyd James Austin III; Michael Kurilla

Insignia
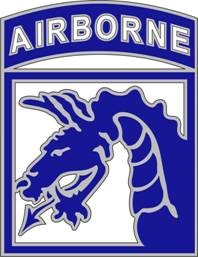
- Combat service identification badge

- Distinctive unit insignia

- Flag

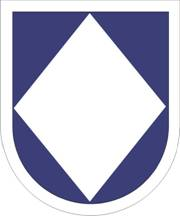
- Beret flash

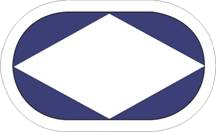
- Background trimming

The XVIII Airborne Corps is a corps of the United States Army that has been in existence since 1942 and saw extensive service during World War II. The corps is designed for rapid deployment anywhere in the world and is referred to as "America's Contingency Corps". Its headquarters are at Fort Bragg, North Carolina, the home of the Airborne and Special Forces. The Corps was first created in Texas as a US Army Reserve unit after the First World War, and prior to the outbreak of the Second World War was located at Fort Sam Houston. After D-Day, its combat formations, including the 82nd Airborne Division and 101st Airborne Division took part in the campaigns in the Netherlands, including the Battle of Arnhem, and the Battle of the Bulge.

The Corps and its subordinate units would go on to participate in the Dominican Civil War, the Vietnam War, Operation Urgent Fury, Operation Just Cause, the Gulf War, Enduring Freedom, and Iraqi Freedom. Along with the 82nd Airborne and the 101st Airborne, which is today an air assault division, it also includes the 3rd Infantry Division at Fort Stewart, Georgia, and the 10th Mountain Division at Fort Drum, New York, along with various support, intelligence and logistics commands, and an airborne military police brigade, among the only of its kind. For most of its existence during and after the Cold War period it was under US Central Command, forming ARCENT's main contribution, but was later placed under the Western Hemisphere Command in 2025.

== History ==
=== Earlier formations known as XVIII Corps ===
The modern XVIII Airborne Corps is not lineally related to two earlier U.S. Army formations known as "XVIII Corps". The first XVIII Corps was authorized by the National Defense Act of 1920 and constituted in the Regular Army on 29 July 1921. The headquarters and headquarters company were organized on 23 August 1922 with Organized Reserve personnel as "Regular Army Inactive" (RAI) units at Dallas, Texas. The headquarters company was withdrawn from the Eighth Corps Area on 11 January 1927, allotted to the Seventh Corps Area, and organized on 3 August 1927 at Kansas City, Missouri, and relocated on 12 October 1931 to Sioux City, Iowa. The corps headquarters was withdrawn from the Regular Army on 1 October 1933 and demobilized, while the headquarters company remained allotted to the Regular Army.

The second iteration of the XVIII Corps was constituted in the Organized Reserve on 1 October 1933, allotted to the Eighth Corps Area, and assigned to the Third Army. The headquarters was concurrently initiated at San Antonio, Texas, with Reserve personnel previously assigned to the demobilized XVIII Corps (RAI). Concurrently, the headquarters company, XVIII Corps was withdrawn from the Seventh Corps Area and reallotted to the Eighth Corps Area, and reorganized on 25 February 1935 at Fort Sam Houston, Texas. The corps headquarters was redesignated on 1 January 1941 as Headquarters, XVIII Army Corps. The XVIII Corps was not activated prior to World War II and was located in San Antonio as of 7 December 1941 in an inactive reserve status. It was disbanded on 5 September 1945.

=== World War II ===
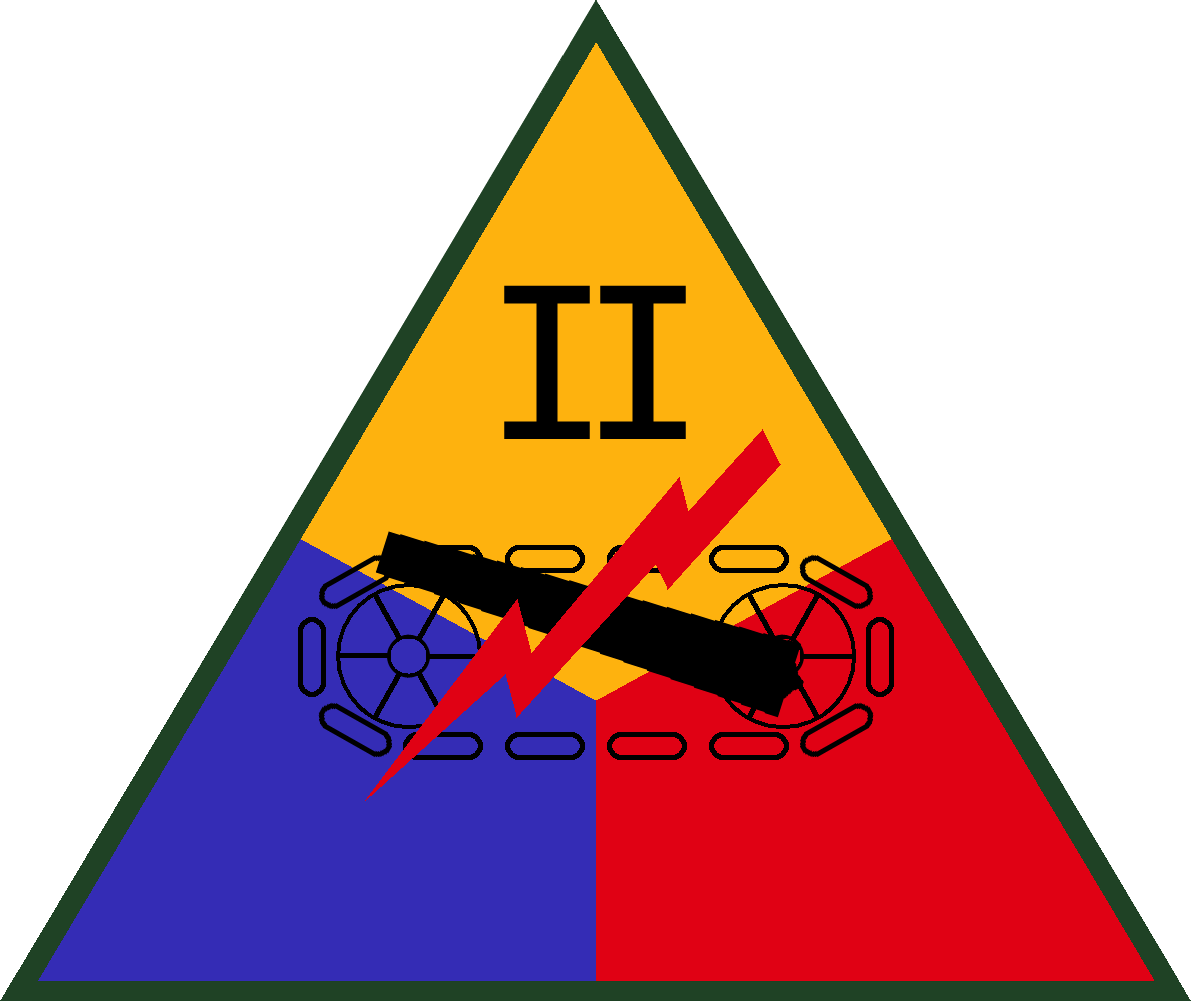
II Armored Corps

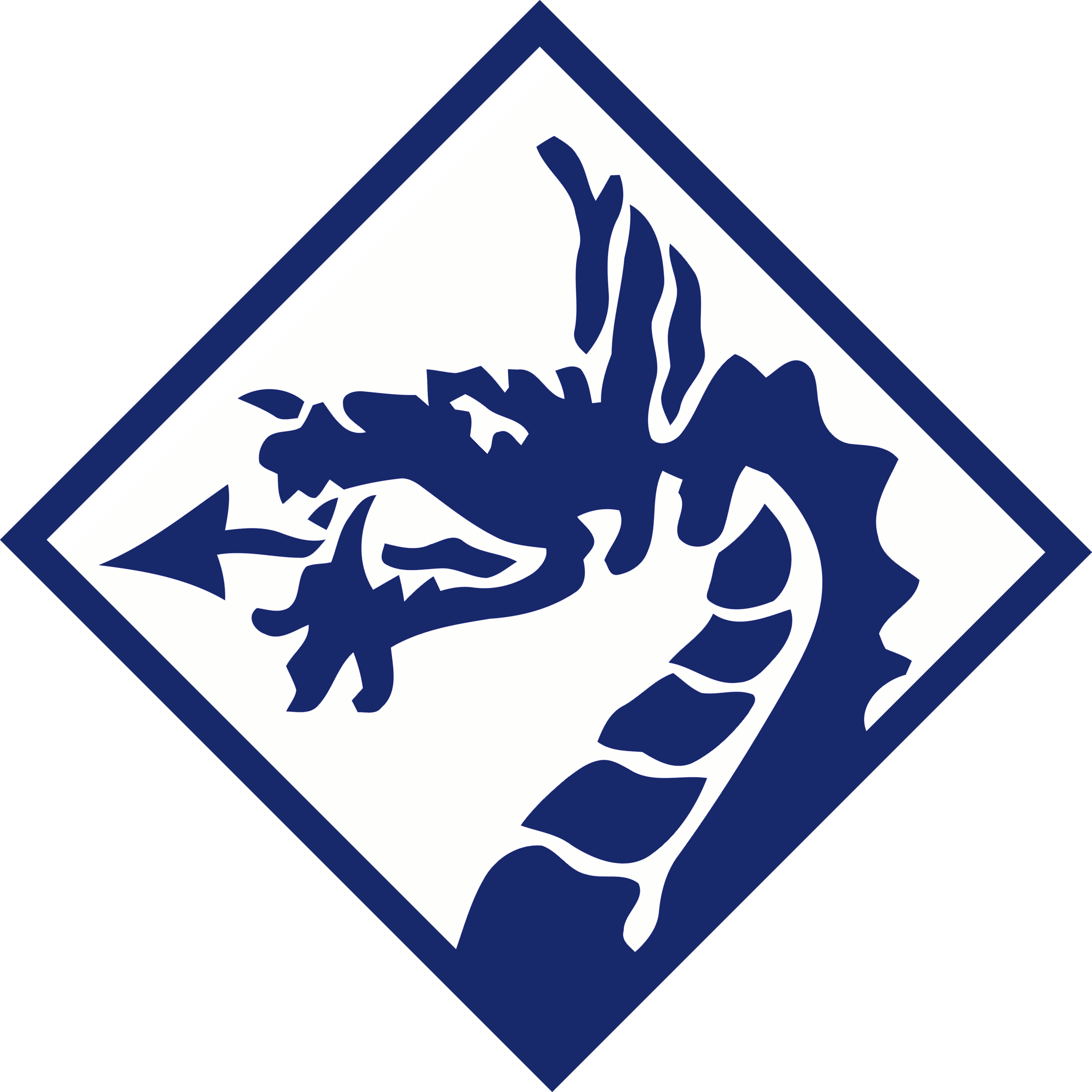
XVIII Corps

XVIII Airborne Corps

The present XVIII Airborne Corps was constituted in the Regular Army on 14 January 1942, five weeks after the entry of the United States into World War II, as the II Armored Corps and was activated on 17 January 1942 at Camp Polk, Louisiana, under the command of Major General William Henry Harrison Morris, Jr. When the concept of armored corps proved unnecessary, II Armored Corps was re-designated as XVIII Corps on 9 October 1943 at the Presidio of Monterey, California.

XVIII Corps deployed to Europe on 17 August 1944 and became the XVIII Airborne Corps on 25 August 1944 at Ogbourne St. George, England, assuming command of the 82nd and 101st Airborne Divisions, as part of the preparation for Operation Market Garden. Prior to this time, the two divisions were assigned to VII Corps and jumped into Normandy during Operation Overlord, the Allied invasion of Normandy, as part of VII Corps.

Major General Matthew Bunker Ridgway, a highly experienced airborne commander who had led the 82nd Airborne Division in Sicily, Italy and Normandy, was chosen to command the corps, which then consisted of the 82nd and 101st Airborne Divisions and was part of the newly created First Allied Airborne Army.

The corps headquarters did not see service in Operation Market Garden, with the British I Airborne Corps being chosen instead to exercise operational command of all Allied airborne forces in the operation, including the 82nd and 101st Airborne Divisions.

Following the Battle of the Bulge, in which the corps played a significant part (and which, during the early stages of the battle, the corps was commanded by Major General James M. Gavin of the 82nd Airborne), all American airborne units on the Western Front fell under command of the corps. XVIII Airborne Corps planned and executed Operation Varsity, the airborne component of Operation Plunder, the crossing of the River Rhine into Germany. It was one of the largest airborne operations of the war, with the British 6th and U.S. 17th Airborne Divisions under command.

After taking part in the Western Allied invasion of Germany, the XVIII Airborne Corps, still under Ridgway, returned to the United States in June 1945 and was initially to take part in the invasion of Japan, codenamed Operation Downfall. However, the Japanese surrendered just weeks later and XVIII Airborne Corps was inactivated on 15 October 1945 at Fort Campbell, Kentucky.

==== World War II units ====
- 1st Infantry Division — 26 January 1945 – 12 February 1945.
- 4th Infantry Division
- 8th Infantry Division — 26 January 1945 – 10 July 1945.
- 17th Airborne Division — 12 August 1944 – 1 January 1945; 15 February 1945 – 24 March 1945.
- 29th Infantry Division
- 30th Infantry Division — 21 December 1944 – 3 February 1945.
- 34th Infantry Division
- 75th Infantry Division — 29 December 1944 – 2 January 1945; 7 January 1945.
- 78th Infantry Division — 3 February 1945 – 12 February 1945.
- 82nd Airborne Division — 12 August 1944 – 17 September 1944; 19 December 1944 – 14 February 1945; 30 April 1945 – 3 January 1946.
- 84th Infantry Division — 20 December 1944 – 21 December 1944.
- 86th Infantry Division — 5 April 1945 – 22 April 1945.
- 89th Infantry Division
- 97th Infantry Division — 10 April 1945 – 22 April 1945.
- 101st Airborne Division — 12 August 1944 – 21 September 1944; 28 February 1945 – 1 April 1945.
- 106th Infantry Division — 20 December 1944 – 6 February 1945.
- 3rd Armored Division — 19 December 1944 – 23 December 1944.
- 5th Armored Division — 4 May 1945 – 10 October 1945.
- 7th Armored Division — 20 December 1944 – 29 January 1945; 30 April 1945 – 9 October 1945.
- 13th Armored Division — 10 April 1945 – 22 April 1945.

=== Cold War ===
The Corps was reactivated at Fort Bragg on 21 May 1951 under the command of Major General John W. Leonard. Since then, the corps has been the primary strategic response force, with subordinate units participating in over a dozen major operations (listed below) in both combat and humanitarian roles, primarily in Central America and the CENTCOM area of responsibility.

In 1958 the XVIII Airborne Corps was given the additional mission of becoming the Strategic Army Corps. The corps was now tasked, in addition, to provide a flexible strike capability that could deploy worldwide, on short notice, without a declaration of an emergency. The 4th Infantry Division at Fort Lewis, Washington, and the 101st Airborne Division at Fort Campbell, Kentucky, were designated as STRAC's first-line divisions, while the 1st Infantry Division at Fort Riley, Kansas, and the 82nd Airborne Division at Fort Bragg were to provide backup in the event of general war. The 5th Logistical Command (later inactivated), also at Fort Bragg, would provide the corps with logistics support, while Fort Bragg's XVIII Airborne Corps Artillery would control artillery units.

The Corps deployed forces to the United States occupation of the Dominican Republic ('Operation Power Pack') in 1965.

The Corps deployed forces to the Vietnam War, including the entire 101st Airborne Division and the 3rd Brigade of the 82nd Airborne division.

In 1967 elements of the Corps were deployed to Detroit to suppress riots, and also to The Congo to support the government there and to rescue civilian hostages as part of Operation Dragon Rouge.

In 1982 the Corps first rotated elements to the Sinai Peninsula as part of the Multinational Force and Observers (UN) to guarantee the Camp David Peace Accords.

In 1983 elements of the Corps were deployed to the island of Grenada as part of Operation Urgent Fury, with the stated goal of reestablishing the democratically elected government.

In 1989 XVIII Airborne Corps, commanded by then LTG Carl Stiner, participated in the invasion of Panama in Operation Just Cause. Stiner served concurrently as Commander of Joint Task Force South.

==== Structure in 1989 ====
NATO Symbol

XVIII (US)

At the end of the Cold War in 1989 the corps consisted of the following formations and units:

- XVIII Airborne Corps, Fort Bragg, North Carolina
  - Headquarters & Headquarters Company
  - 18th Personnel Group
  - 18th Finance Group
  - 1st Battalion, 2nd Air Defense Artillery, Fort Stewart
  - 10th Mountain Division (Light), Fort Drum, New York
  - 24th Infantry Division (Mechanized), Fort Stewart, Georgia
  - 82nd Airborne Division, Fort Bragg, North Carolina
  - 101st Airborne Division (Air Assault), Fort Campbell, Kentucky
  - XVIII Airborne Corps Artillery, Fort Bragg
    - 18th Field Artillery Brigade (Airborne), Fort Bragg
      - Headquarters & Headquarters Battery
      - 3rd Battalion, 8th Field Artillery (24 × M198 155mm towed howitzer)
      - 5th Battalion, 8th Field Artillery (24 × M198 155mm towed howitzer)
      - 3rd Battalion, 27th Field Artillery (27 × M270 Multiple Launch Rocket System)
      - 1st Battalion, 39th Field Artillery (Airborne) (24 × M198 155mm towed howitzer)
      - 1st Field Artillery Detachment (Target Acquisition)
  - 18th Aviation Brigade (Airborne), Fort Bragg
    - Headquarters & Headquarters Company
    - 1st Battalion, 58th Aviation (Air Traffic Control)
    - 1st Battalion, 159th Aviation (General Support)
    - 2nd Battalion, 159th Aviation (Medium Lift)
    - 3rd Battalion, 159th Aviation (Attack)
    - 2nd Battalion, 229th Aviation (Attack) (former 2nd Battalion, 101st Aviation)
  - 20th Engineer Brigade (Airborne), Fort Bragg
    - 27th Engineer Battalion (Airborne)
    - 30th Engineer Battalion (Topographic)
    - 37th Engineer Battalion (Airborne)
    - 175th Engineer Company
    - 264th Engineer Company (Bridge)
    - 362nd Engineer Company
  - 16th Military Police Brigade (Airborne), Fort Bragg
    - 503rd Military Police Battalion (Airborne)
  - 35th Signal Brigade (Airborne), Fort Bragg
    - 25th Signal Battalion (Corps Area)
    - 50th Signal Battalion (Corps Command Operations) (Airborne)
    - 327th Signal Battalion (Corps Radio)
    - 426th Signal Battalion (Corps Area)
  - 525th Military Intelligence Brigade (Airborne), Fort Bragg
    - 224th Military Intelligence Battalion (Aerial Exploitation), Hunter Army Airfield, Georgia
    - 319th Military Intelligence Battalion (Operations)
    - 519th Military Intelligence Battalion (Tactical Exploitation) (Airborne)
  - 1st Corps Support Command (Airborne), Fort Bragg
    - subordination formations and units

=== Desert Storm ===
In 1991, XVIII Airborne Corps participated in the Persian Gulf War. The corps was responsible for securing VII Corps' northern flank against a possible Iraqi counterattack. Along with the 82nd and 101st Airborne Divisions, 24th Infantry Division and 3rd Armored Cavalry Regiment, XVIII Airborne Corps also gained operational control of the French 6th Light Armor Division (LAD) (which also included units from the French Foreign Legion).

During Operations Desert Shield and Desert Storm, XVIII Airborne Corps Artillery consisted of the 3d Battalion, 8th Field Artillery; 5th Battalion, 8th Field Artillery; and the 1st Battalion (Airborne), 39th Field Artillery. The living quarters for these three units were situated between the 82d Airborne Division and the Special Forces at Fort Bragg. Of the three units, only 1–39th was airborne qualified and served as the only fully airborne deployable 155 mm Field Artillery unit in history. The 1–39th FA and 3–8th FA were key components of the thrust into Iraq in the first Gulf War, providing fire support for the French Foreign Legion and the 82nd Airborne Division.

The 5th Battalion, 8th Field Artillery also served in a major support role for 82d and French troops during the Gulf War. It consisted of three individual batteries. Batteries A and B were Airborne-qualified, while Battery C was air assault. Batteries A and B were assigned to Fort Bragg, North Carolina and Battery C was assigned to Fort Campbell, Kentucky. All of the battalions were subsequently re-flagged during the years following the Gulf War.

Task Force 118 had flown the OH-58D Kiowa Warrior off naval vessels during Operation Prime Chance in the 1980s, operating against Iran in the Persian Gulf. It was redesignated the 4th Squadron, 17th Cavalry on 15 January 1991. During the Gulf War of 1991 it was part of the 18th Aviation Brigade.

==== Major formations, 1950–2006 ====
The 82nd and 101st Airborne Divisions have served with the corps since the 1950s. The 24th Infantry Division (Mechanized) was 'reflagged' as the 3rd Infantry Division (Mechanized) in April 1996.

- 7th Infantry Division (Light)
- 10th Mountain Division (Light Infantry)
- XVIII Airborne Corps Artillery
  - 18th Field Artillery Brigade
- 1st Sustainment Command (Theater)
- 35th Signal Brigade
- 18th Aviation Brigade (no longer active)
- 20th Engineer Brigade
- 525th Battlefield Surveillance Brigade
- 108th Air Defense Artillery Brigade
- 16th Military Police Brigade
- 44th Medical Command
- 163rd Ordnance
- additional smaller, National Guard, and Reserve units

=== 21st century ===
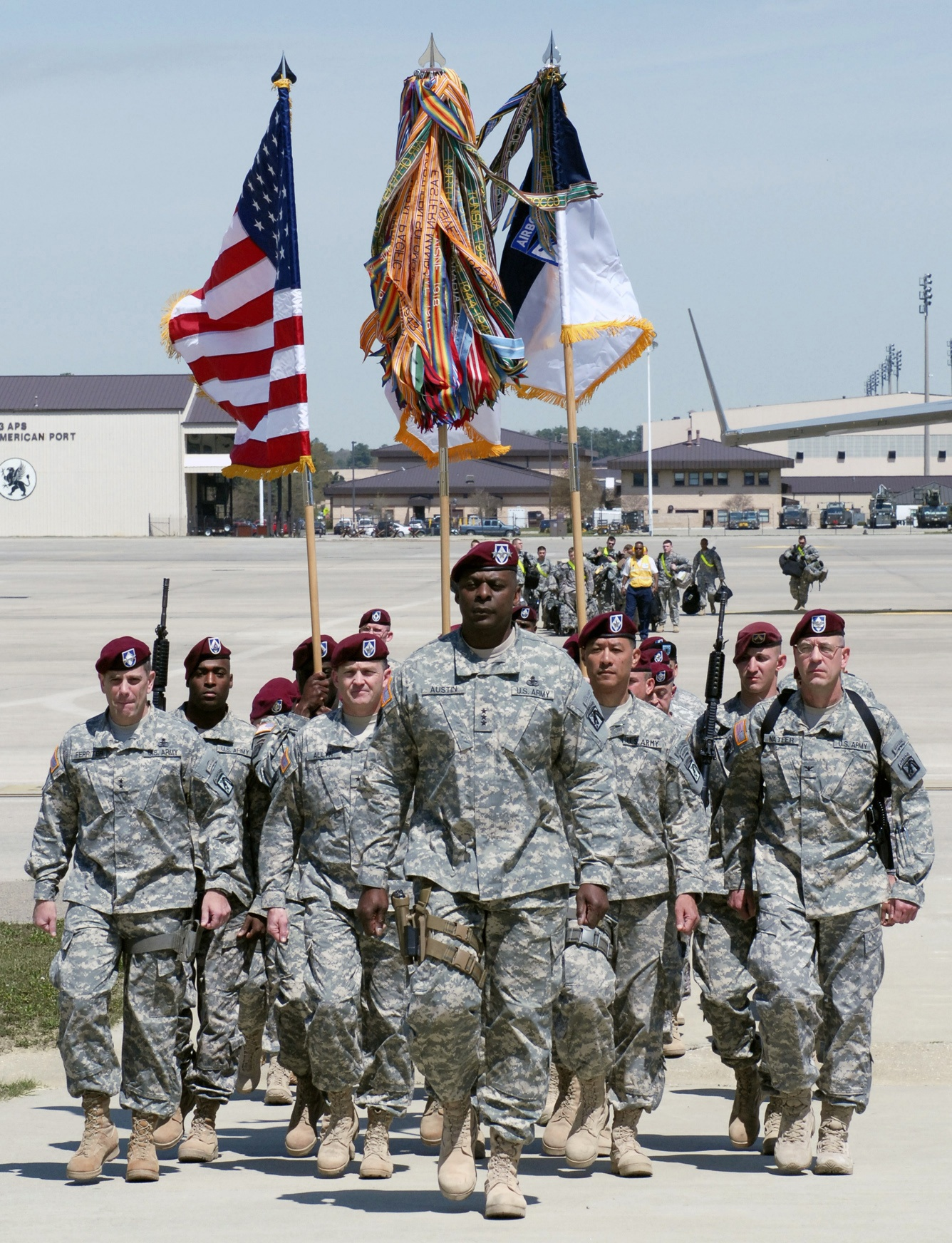
The XVIII Airborne Corps command group, led by LTG (later GEN) Lloyd J. Austin, returns home from Operation Iraqi Freedom in 2009

The Corps headquarters was deployed to Afghanistan from May 2002 – 2003, and became Combined Joint Task Force 180 for the deployment.

XVIII Airborne Corps was deployed from January 2005 to January 2006 to Baghdad, Iraq, where it served as the Multi-National Corps – Iraq. Following its return, XVIII Airborne Corps and its subordinate units began the process of modernization and reorganization.

Under Army Chief of Staff Peter Schoomaker's restructuring of the Army, the corps headquarters of the XVIII Airborne Corps will lose its airborne (specifically parachute) certification as a cost-cutting measure—the same will occur to the divisional headquarters of the 82nd Airborne Division. This plan is designed to follow the U.S. Army's restructuring plan to go from being division-based to brigade-based. This will mean that the largest units that will be airborne – specifically parachute certified – will be at the brigade level. Even so, for traditional and historical reasons, the formation will continue to be called the XVIII Airborne Corps.

The divisions that fall under the XVIII Airborne Corps (as well as the other two corps in the Army) are in a period of transition, shifting from corps control to fall directly under FORSCOM, eliminating the corps status as a middle man. This ties in with the Army's broad modularity plan, as a corps can deploy and support any unit, not just the units subordinate to the corps. The 3d Infantry Division, the 10th Mountain Division (Light Infantry), and the 101st Airborne Division (Air Assault) have already changed over to direct FORSCOM control. The 82nd Airborne Division will transfer after the division returns from Afghanistan.

In August 2006, XVIII Airborne Corps traveled to South Korea to participate in Ulchi Focus Lens, a joint training exercise between the Republic of Korea Army and coalition forces stationed there.

In mid-April 2007, the Department of the Army confirmed the next OIF deployment schedule, with XVIII Airborne Corps deploying to relieve III Corps as the MNC-I at Camp Victory, Baghdad, Iraq. XVIII Airborne Corps is scheduled to replace III Corps in November 2007. The corps will deploy along with 1st Armored Division and 4th Infantry Division, as well as 1st Brigade Combat Team, 10th Mountain Division, and 1st BCT, 82nd Airborne Division.

On 21 December 2016, Stars and Stripes reported that in August the XVIII Airborne Corps deployed to Iraq for Operation Inherent Resolve, in December this included the XVIII Airborne Corps headquarters and the 1st Special Forces Command, which is deployed as the Special Operations Joint Task Force – Operation Inherent Resolve. The 18th Field Artillery Brigade deployed into Iraq with High Mobility Artillery Rocket Systems.

A Canadian Army General has served with the XVIII Corps since 2007.

XVIII Airborne Corps returned to Fort Bragg (which was then-named Fort Liberty), in October 2022 after a nine-month deployment to Germany, in support of NATO and European Allies and partners. The mission was to provide a joint task force-capable headquarters in light of the 2022 Russian invasion of Ukraine.

== Organization ==
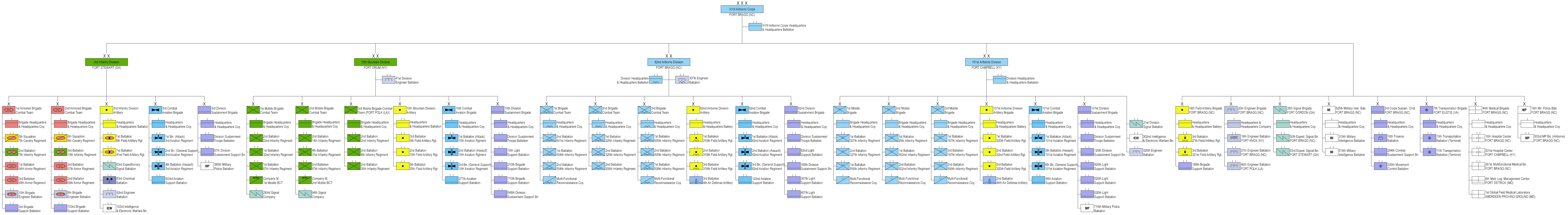
XVIII Airborne Corps organization October 2026 (click to enlarge)

- XVIII Airborne Corps, Fort Bragg
  - 3rd Infantry Division, Fort Stewart
  - 10th Mountain Division, Fort Drum
  - 82nd Airborne Division, Fort Bragg
  - 101st Airborne Division, Fort Campbell
  - 18th Field Artillery Brigade, Fort Bragg
  - 20th Engineer Brigade, Fort Bragg
  - 3rd Corps Sustainment Command, Fort Bragg
  - 7th Transportation Brigade, Fort Eustis
  - 16th Military Police Brigade, Fort Bragg
  - 35th Corps Signal Brigade, Fort Bragg
  - 44th Medical Brigade, Fort Bragg
  - 525th Military Intelligence Brigade, Fort Bragg

Other units based alongside XVIII Airborne Corps:

- 52nd Ordnance Group (EOD), Fort Campbell and Fort Bragg, part of 20th CBRNE Command
- 108th Air Defense Artillery Brigade, Fort Bragg, part of 32nd Army Air & Missile Defense Command
- 18th Air Support Operations Group, Pope Field (United States Air Force unit responsible for coordinating corps tactical air support)

== Operations ==
The corps has participated in a number of operations since then:

- Operation Power Pack – Dominican Republic, 1965
- Operation Urgent Fury – Grenada, 1983
- Operation Golden Pheasant – Honduras, 1988
- Operation Nimrod Dancer – Panama, 1989
- Operation Hawkeye – U.S. Virgin Islands, 1989
- Operation Just Cause – Panama, 1989
- Operation Desert Shield – Saudi Arabia, 1990–1991
- Operation Desert Storm – Saudi Arabia, Kuwait and Iraq, 1991
- Operation GTMO – Cuba, 1991
- Operation Hurricane Andrew – Florida, 1992
- Operation Restore Hope – Somalia, 1992
- Operation Uphold/Maintain Democracy – Haiti, 1994
- Operation Vigilant Warrior – Kuwait, 1994
- Operation Joint Forge – Bosnia, 1998
- Operation Enduring Freedom – Afghanistan, 2002, 2014
- Operation Iraqi Freedom – Iraq, 2003, 2005, 2008
- Operation Unified Response – Haiti, 2010
- Operation New Dawn – Iraq, 2011
- Operation Inherent Resolve – Iraq and Syria, 2015–2016

== Commanders ==
Individuals who have commanded XVIII Airborne Corps include:

- LTG Matthew B. Ridgway, 1944 – 1945
- Corps inactive, 1945 – 1952
- LTG John W. Leonard, 1952
- MG Thomas F. Hickey, 1952 – 1953
- MG Joseph P. Cleland, 1953 – 1955
- MG Ridgely Gaither, 1955
- LTG Paul D. Adams, 1955 – 1957
- LTG Robert F. Sink, 1957 – 1960
- MG Dwight E. Beach (acting), 1960
- LTG Thomas J. H. Trapnell, 1960 – 1961
- LTG Hamilton H. Howze, 1961 – 1962
- LTG William C. Westmoreland, 1963 – 1964
- MG Harry H. Critz (acting), 1964
- LTG John W. Bowen, 1964 – 1965
- BG John A. Seitz (acting), 1965
- BG Roderick Wetherill (acting), 1965
- MG Joe S. Lawrie (acting), 1965
- LTG Bruce Palmer Jr., 1965 – 1967
- MG Joe S. Lawrie (acting), 1967
- LTG John L. Throckmorton, 1967
- LTG Robert H. York, 1967 – 1968
- LTG John J. Tolson, 1968 – 1971
- LTG John H. Hay, 1971 – 1973
- LTG Richard J. Seitz, 1973 – 1975
- LTG Henry E. Emerson, 1975 – 1977
- LTG Volney F. Warner, 1977 – 1979
- LTG Thomas H. Tackaberry, 1979 – 1981
- LTG Jack V. Mackmull, 1981 – 1984
- LTG James J. Lindsay, 1984 – 1986
- LTG John W. Foss, 1986 – 1988
- LTG Carl W. Stiner, 1988 – 1990
- LTG Gary E. Luck, 1990
- MG William A. Roosma (acting), 1990
- LTG Gary E. Luck, 1990 – 1993
- LTG Henry H. Shelton, 1993 – 1996
- LTG John M. Keane, 1996 – 1998
- LTG William F. Kernan, 1998 – 2000
- LTG Dan K. McNeill, 2000 – 2003
- LTG John R. Vines, 2003 – 2006
- LTG Lloyd Austin III, 2006 – 2009
- LTG Frank Helmick, 2009 – 2012
- LTG Daniel B. Allyn, 2012 – 2013
- LTG Joseph Anderson, 2013 – 2015
- LTG Stephen J. Townsend, 2015 – 2018
- LTG Paul LaCamera, 2018 – 2019
- LTG Michael Kurilla, 2019 – 2022
- LTG Chris Donahue, 2022 – 2024
- LTG Gregory K. Anderson, 2024–present

== Notable members ==
- John D. Altenburg, MG – Deputy Judge Advocate General of the U.S. Army.
- Ralph Eaton, BG – 82nd Airborne Division and XVIII Airborne Corps Chief of Staff.
- Michael C. Flowers, BG – Commander, Joint POW/MIA Accounting Command.
- Michael T. Flynn, LTG – 25th National Security Advisor, Director of the Defense Intelligence Agency
- Charles D. Gemar, LTC – US Astronaut.
- Teresa King, SGM – First female Commandant of the U.S. Army Drill Sergeant Academy.
- Stanley A. McChrystal, GEN – ISAF Commander.
- Raymond T. Odierno, GEN – 38th Army Chief of Staff.
- James Peake, LTG – Secretary of Veterans Affairs.
- David Petraeus, GEN – ISAF Commander and Director of the Central Intelligence Agency.
- David M. Rodriguez, GEN – Commander, U.S. Africa Command and FORSCOM.
- Arthur D. Simons, COL – Led the Son Tay raid during the Vietnam War.
- Michael Tomczyk, CPT – Computer entrepreneur and joint developer of the VIC-20.
- Thomas R. Turner II, LTG – Commanding General of United States Army North.
- James C. Yarbrough, BG – Commander, Joint Readiness Training Center at Fort Polk.
- Wayne Eyre, GEN – Commander of the Canadian Army and Chief of Defence Staff.
