= John Seitz =

John Seitz may refer to:

- John F. Seitz (1892–1979), American cinematographer and inventor
- John A. Seitz (1908–1987), United States Army general
- John F. R. Seitz (1908–1978), United States Army general
