= Joe S. Lawrie =

U.S. Army major general

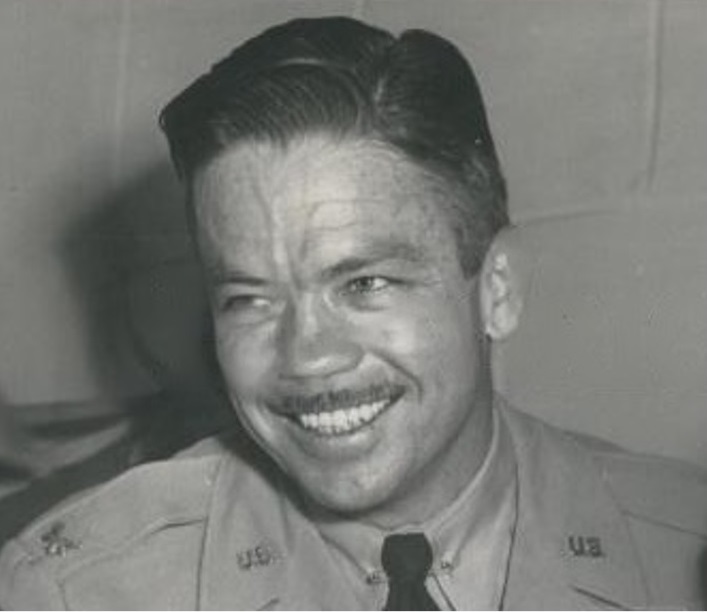
- Lawrie as a lieutenant colonel. Chicago Sun-Times, September 11, 1948.
- Born: Joe Stallings Lawrie; February 14, 1914; Suffolk, Virginia, U.S.
- Died: February 25, 2009 (aged 95); Richardson, Texas, U.S.
- Burial place: Sparkman-Hillcrest Memorial Park Cemetery, Dallas, Texas, U.S.
- Alma mater: Louisiana State University; United States Army Command and General Staff College; Armed Forces Staff College; United States Army War College
- Spouse: Edna Dorothy "Dottie" Gilmore (m. 1937–1999)
- Children: 3
- Military career
- Service: Organized Reserve Corps; United States Army
- Service years: 1936–1937 (Reserve); 1937–1967 (Army)
- Rank: Major General
- Service number: 0-20914
- Unit: U.S. Army Infantry Branch
- Commands: 1st Battalion, 503rd Infantry Regiment; 503rd Infantry Regiment; 508th Airborne Regimental Combat Team; Army Section, Joint United States Military Advisory Group Thailand; 82nd Airborne Division; XVIII Airborne Corps
- Wars: World War II; Operation Power Pack
- Awards: Army Distinguished Service Medal; Silver Star; Legion of Merit; Bronze Star Medal; Air Medal
- Other work: Photographer

Joe S. Lawrie (February 14, 1914 – February 25, 2009) was a career officer in the United States Army. He served from 1937 to 1967 and attained the rank of major general. A veteran of World War II and Operation Power Pack, Lawrie's commands included 1st Battalion, 503rd Infantry Regiment, 503rd Infantry Regiment, 508th Airborne Regimental Combat Team, the army section of Joint United States Military Advisory Group Thailand, and the 82nd Airborne Division, in addition to serving as acting commander of the XVIII Airborne Corps. Lawrie's awards and decorations included the Army Distinguished Service Medal, Silver Star, Legion of Merit, Bronze Star Medal, and Air Medal.

== Early life ==
Joe Stallings Lawrie was born in Suffolk, Virginia on February 14, 1914, the son of George W. Lawrie and Jennie (Partridge) Lawrie. Lawrie's father was a lifelong friend of baseball player, manager and executive George Stallings, for whom he named his son. Lawrie was raised in St. Petersburg, Florida, and was a 1932 graduate of St. Petersburg High School, where he played football and baseball.

Lawrie was a standout athlete in his youth; as a pre-teen and a teenager, he was a spring training batboy for the Boston Braves. By the time he was in his late teens, Lawrie was being mentored by Braves players Frank Gibson and Johnny Evers, and was permitted to take part in spring training workouts and scrimmages. By the early 1930s, Lawrie was well known as an American Legion Baseball player, and he and his father George were both summer employees of the Braves in Boston.

After completing high school, Lawrie attended Louisiana State University, from which he graduated with a AB degree in 1936. While in college, Lawrie played baseball and football, and was the football team's starting quarterback in his final two seasons. Lawrie was also selected for the Omicron Delta Kappa honor society, and was a member of the Army Reserve Officers' Training Corps. He was commissioned as a second lieutenant of Infantry in the Organized Reserve Corps in May 1936, and spent a year participating in the competitive examination process for an active duty commission in the United States Army. In 1937, Lawrie was one of 50 participants in the examination process who qualified, and he received his regular army commission in July 1937.

== Professional education ==
Lawrie's professional army training included:

- Infantry Officer Basic Course (1937)
- Infantry Officer Advanced Course (1941)
- Airborne Course (1941)

In addition to his professional development courses, Lawrie's military education included:

- United States Army Command and General Staff College (1946)
- Armed Forces Staff College (1949)
- United States Army War College (1953)

== Start of career ==
After receiving his commission, Lawrie was assigned to the 9th Infantry Regiment at Fort Sam Houston, Texas. After completing his initial training with the Infantry Officer Basic Course, in 1939, Lawrie was posted to the Philippine Department at Fort William McKinley, where he served until 1941, when he was one of the first officers to complete the U.S. Airborne Course, then completed the Infantry Officer Advanced Course.

During World War II, Lawrie served with the 503rd Infantry Regiment, and was assigned successively as regimental operations officer (S-3), commander of its 1st Battalion, regimental executive officer, and regimental commander. During the war, he advanced in rank from temporary major to lieutenant colonel. Lawrie served in the South West Pacific theatre throughout the conflict, including the Defense of Australia, New Guinea campaign and Philippines campaign.

== Continued career ==
After the war, Lawrie was assigned to duty at the Airborne School. Subsequent assignments included Infantry and Airborne advisor to the government of Saudi Arabia, and director of training for the Joint Airborne Troop Board at Fort Bragg, North Carolina. In 1946, he graduated from the United States Army Command and General Staff College. In 1948, he was promoted to the permanent rank of major. He was a 1949 graduate of the Armed Forces Staff College. In June 1951, Lawrie was promoted to temporary colonel. From October 1951 to June 1952, he commanded the 508th Airborne Regimental Combat Team.

In 1952, Lawrie was selected for attendance at the United States Army War College, and he graduated in 1953. In 1954, he was promoted to permanent lieutenant colonel. Lawrie's post-War College assignments included a posting as chief of the army section of Joint United States Military Advisory Group Thailand. He later performed duty on the army staff at the Pentagon, which included assignment as executive assistant to Wilber M. Brucker, the Secretary of the Army.

== Later career ==
In January 1961, Lawrie was promoted to brigadier general, and in February he was assigned to Fort Campbell, Kentucky as assistant division commander of the 101st Airborne Division. In 1962, Lawrie was assigned to United States European Command as director of personnel at the headquarters element based in Paris. In early 1963, he was promoted to major general and assigned as deputy chief of staff for personnel (G-1) at the European Command's main headquarters in Heidelberg.

In July 1965, Lawrie was assigned to succeed Robert H. York as commander of the 82nd Airborne Division while the division was taking part in Operation Power Pack, the U.S. intervention in the Dominican Civil War. After the division returned to the United States, in August Lawrie was one of the first soldiers to parachute from a Lockheed C-141 Starlifter when units of the 82nd Airborne took part in an experiment to study the feasibility of conducting airborne operations with jet aircraft. In March 1967, Lawrie was assigned to the XVIII Airborne Corps headquarters pending his retirement; he served as acting corps commander until he retired in June.

== Retirement and death ==
In retirement, Lawrie was a resident of first San Antonio, and later Richardson, Texas. Lawrie developed a reputation as a photographer while still in uniform, and he studied photography with Yoichi Okamoto in Washington, D.C., at the United States Department of Agriculture Photographic School in Washington, D.C., the Leica Academies in New York City and Wetzlar, Germany, and under John Doscher at the Country School of Photography in South Woodstock, Vermont.

Lawrie's photos were displayed at numerous exhibits throughout the world, and he was also a sought-after judge at photo contests, both in the United States and internationally. In 1971, he was made an associate of the Photographic Society of America in recognition of his work to advance photography as an art form, including his efforts to document rural scenes in Texas before they were lost to population growth and continued urbanization.

Lawrie died in Richardson on February 25, 2009. He was interred at Sparkman-Hillcrest Memorial Park Cemetery.

== Awards ==
Lawrie's awards and decorations included the Army Distinguished Service Medal, Silver Star, Legion of Merit, Bronze Star Medal, and Air Medal. In addition, he was awarded the Combat Infantryman Badge and Parachutist Badge.

== Family ==
In 1937, Lawrie married Edna Dorothy Gilmore (1912–1999), who was known as Dotty. They were the parents of three children — Lynn, Heddy, and Bruce.
