= General Flowers =

General Flowers may refer to:

- Alfred K. Flowers (born 1947), U.S. Air Force major general
- Michael C. Flowers (fl. 1970s–2000s), U.S. Army brigadier general
- Robert B. Flowers (fl. 1960s–2010s), U.S. Army lieutenant general
