= 50th Expeditionary Signal Battalion =

50th Signal Battalion
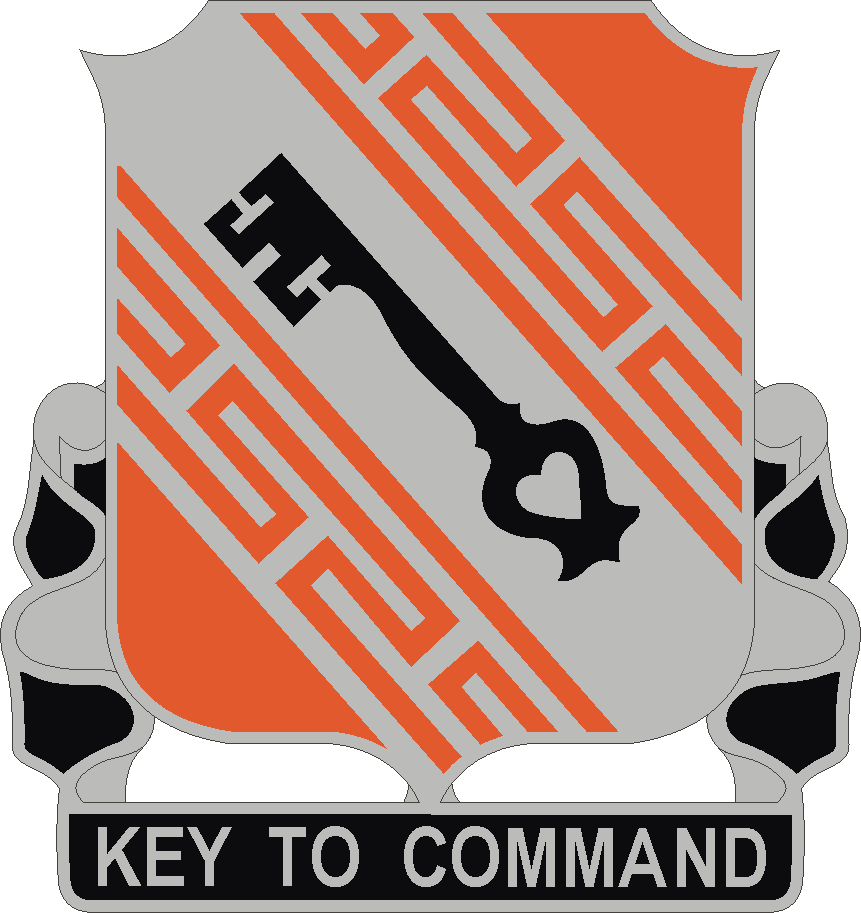
- Distinctive Unit Insignia
- Active: 1899-1921; 1940-45; 1951-present. 100 years active
- Country: United States of America
- Branch: Regular Army
- Type: Signal
- Size: Battalion
- Part of: 35th Signal Brigade
- Garrison/HQ: Fort Bragg, NC
- Motto: "Key to Command!"

Commanders
- Commander: LTC Nathan Folgert
- Command Sergeant Major: CSM Chester Mosier

Insignia
- Former 50th Signal Battalion Beret Flash, from 1982—2006. Prior to that, this flash was worn by the 35th Signal Group, the 50th's parent organization.

The 50th Expeditionary Signal Battalion-Enhanced is a United States Army unit which is part of the 35th Signal Brigade located at Fort Bragg, North Carolina. The Brigade's mission is to provide worldwide contingency, force projection, forced-entry signal support to the XVIII Airborne Corps for power-projection operations during war and operations other than war.

In 2018, 50th Expeditionary Signal Battalion-Enhanced (50th ESB-E), 35th Theater Tactical Signal Brigade is serving as the ESB-E pilot unit. 50th ESB-E supports the XVIII Airborne Corps. Potentially this ESB-E will provide capabilities that are scalable, from small units (forcible-entry alongside paratrooper jumps), to larger, mature operations, as an expeditionary force keeps growing on the ground.

== History ==
The 50th has been supporting the needs of the Army on and off since 1899, making it one of the oldest active-duty signal units. With missions ranging from underwater cabling to disaster relief home and abroad to convoy security, to peacekeeping, the 50th Signal Battalion has had a broad range of missions.

The unit has served with distinction in the Philippines, Japan, Iceland, France, Germany, Iraq, Afghanistan, Liberia, Somalia, Dominican Republic, Grenada, Panama, Jamaica, and Honduras. The 50th stormed the beaches at Normandy and led from the front in Desert Storm. It was the first and only Airborne Signal Battalion when it joined the XVIII Airborne Corps in the 1950s, though the airborne tab was dropped as a part of force modularity in 2006.

== Notable members ==
- Lenin O. Castillo, Command Sergeant Major, current Command Senior Enlisted Leader of the Joint Enabling Capabilities Command (JECC), subordinate unit of the United States Transportation Command. Began his career in 1998 at Company A, 50th Signal Battalion (Corps)(Forced Entry)(Airborne). Served as unit Command Sergeant Major from 2020 to 2022.
- Merlin J. Kynaston, Colonel, current commander of the Joint Communication Support Element (JCSE), subordinate unit of the Joint Enabling Capabilities Command (JECC). Served as the battalion commander from 2022 to 2024.
- David Isaacson, Lieutenant General, current Director for the J-6, Joint Chiefs of Staff. Began his career in 1988 as a platoon leader, company executive officer, battalion operations officer and company commander in the 50th Signal Battalion (Airborne). Served as battalion commander of the unit from 2004 to 2006.
- Vaughn O. Lang, Lieutenant General, served as commander for Company B and then the S3 for the 50th Signal Battalion (Airborne) upon completion of Officer’s Basic Course at Fort Monmouth, New Jersey in 1952.
