= 319th Military Intelligence Battalion (United States) =

319th Intelligence and Electronic Warfare Battalion
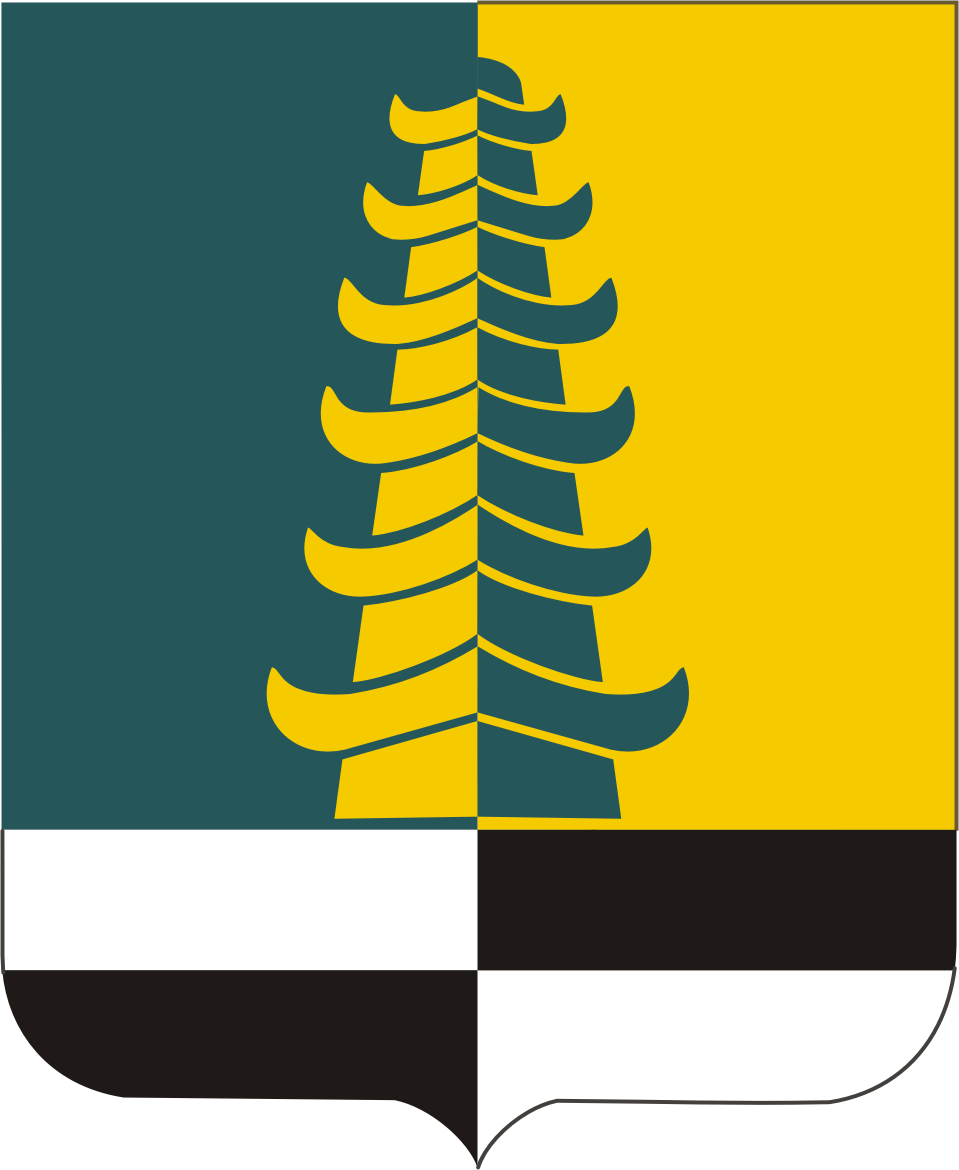
- Coat of Arms
- Country: United States
- Branch: United States Army
- Type: Military Intelligence and Electronic Warfare
- Role: • Collection Management • Communications • Counterintelligence • Electronic Attack • Human Intelligence • Imagery Intelligence • Intelligence Analysis • Long-Range Surveillance • Remote Battlefield Surveillance • Signals Intelligence
- Size: Battalion
- Part of: 82nd Airborne Division
- Garrison/HQ: Fort Bragg
- Motto: • “Hostem Cogere” • Confine the Enemy
- Colors: • Gold • Oriental Blue

Insignia
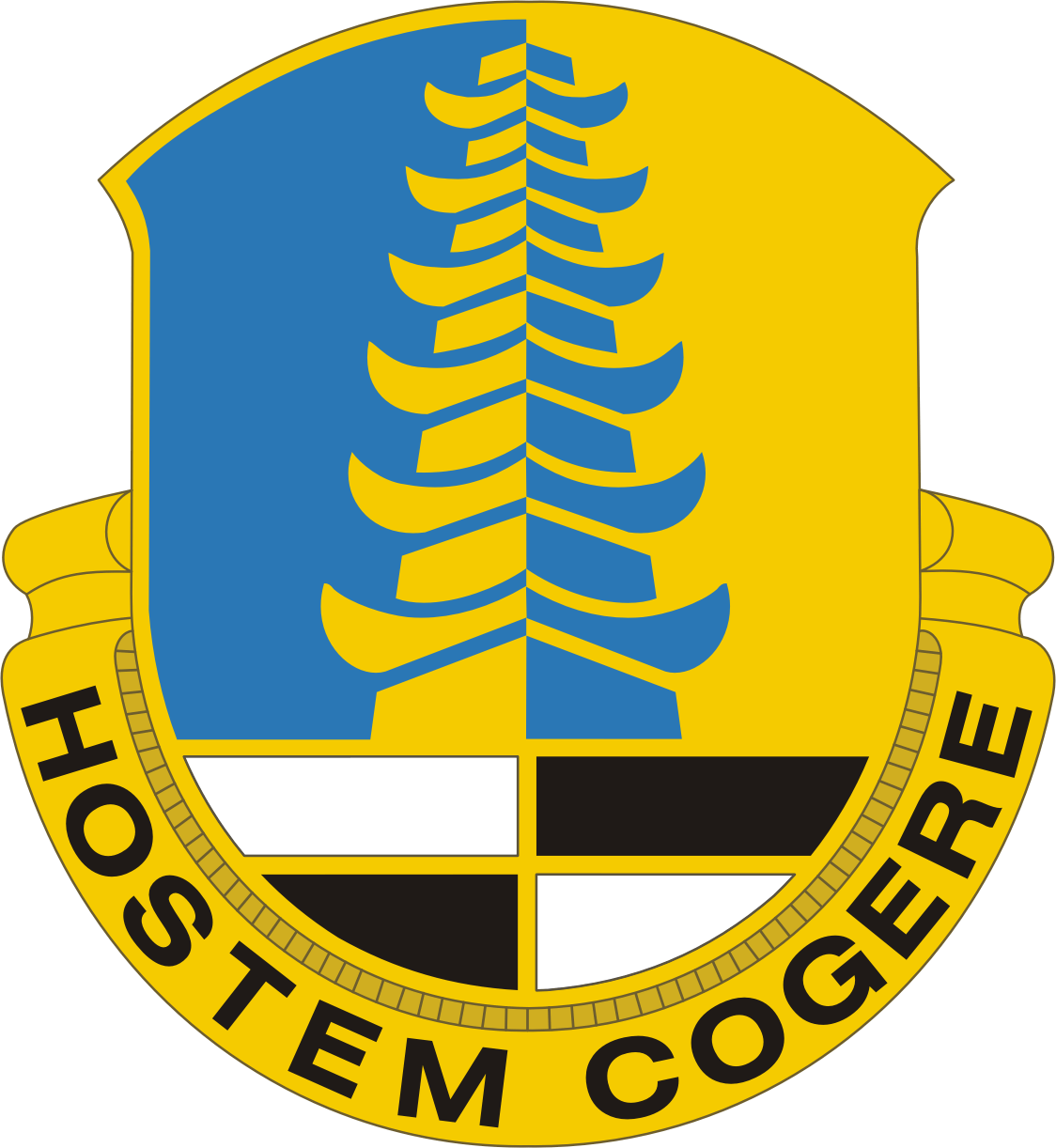
- Distinctive Unit Insignia

The 319th Military Intelligence Battalion is a military intelligence battalion in the United States Army and is part of 1st Brigade Combat Team, 82nd Airborne Division. It was formerly part of the 525th Military Intelligence Brigade (Expeditionary).

== History ==
The 319th Military Intelligence Battalion (Operations) traces its lineage to the 319th Military Intelligence Headquarters Detachment at Bad Schwalbach, Germany, 1 August 1945, an interrogation unit for German Prisoners of War.

In 1946, the unit was sent to Japan. It was joined by other interrogation units which served in the Philippines in 1944 and later the reformed 319th served in the Korean War. After deactivation in 1968, the battalion was reactivated in 1982 at Fort Bragg, North Carolina, as a subordinate unit of the 525th Military Intelligence Brigade to provide both general intelligence support and special communications support to the XVIII Airborne Corps. In October 1983, elements of the battalion deployed to the island of Grenada for Operation Urgent Fury.

In 1988, battalion personnel participated in the emergency deployment to Honduras to counter an incursion by Nicaraguan forces. In 1989, the 319th deployed to Panama in support of Operation Just Cause. The 319th MI Battalion deployed to Saudi Arabia for Operation Desert Shield as part of the XVIII Airborne Corps. In September 1994, the battalion deployed to the island of Haiti in support of Operation Uphold Democracy.

In December 1995 and again in October 1996, the battalion deployed elements to Hungary, Italy, and Bosnia in support of Operation Joint Endeavor. In March 2003, the Battalion's B Company (TENCAP) deployed to Operation Iraqi Freedom in support of the 1st Marine Expeditionary Force (MEF).

In November 2004 the 319th (Task Force Hurricane) deployed to Baghdad, Iraq along with the 525th MI BDE (Task Force Lightning) ahead of the XVIII Airborne Corps assuming the mission of the Multi-National Corps Iraq (MNC-I), as well as intelligence responsibilities for the Multi-National Force Iraq (MNF-I). Alpha Company and Bravo Company incorporated personnel of 297th MI BN, 513th MI BDE (INSCOM) which became a separate BN Task Force under 525th MI BDE, doubling their deployed strength and equipment. The units redeployed in November 2005 after turning the mission over to V Corps' 302nd MI BN, 205th MI BDE. During this time, Bravo Company, 319th MI BN (Task Force Banshee) became the first unit to download RQ-4 Global Hawk imagery in a theater of war.

The 319th Military Intelligence Battalion later deployed to Regional Command South, Afghanistan in support of Operation Enduring Freedom in July 2010 and stayed there until July 2011. After returning to Fort Bragg, North Carolina the 319th Military Intelligence Battalion prepared for another deployment. They deployed to Regional Command East, Afghanistan in support of Operation Enduring Freedom in January 2013 and returned to Fort Bragg, North Carolina in October 2013.

On October 16, 2024, the 319th IEW BN in Fort Bragg , NC, was moved from the north side of the post to the southern area to support the 82nd Airborne Division mission. Exactly one year later, 319th completely detached from its parent unit, 525th EMIB, and reassigned to 1st Brigade Combat Team, 82nd Airborne Division . As of October 16, 2025, all of the military intelligence companies in the infantry brigades have been regrouped into the 319th IEW BN or into 82nd ABN DIV HQ. Since the 82nd ABN DIV has reintroduced an IEW BN to its formation, there has been progress in disabling the 319th IEW BN and reactivating the 313th IEW BN. The 313th is recognized as one of the most decorated military battalions in United States Army history.

== Lineage ==
- Constituted 14 July 1945 in the Army of the United States as the 319th Headquarters Intelligence Detachment
- Activated 1 August 1945 in Germany
- Inactivated 31 October 1946 in Germany
- Redesignated 20 December 1946 as the 319th Military Intelligence Company
- Activated 30 December 1946 in Japan
- Reorganized and redesignated 1 September 1952 as the 319th Military Intelligence Service Company and allotted to the Regular Army
- Inactivated 28 March 1954 in Japan
- Redesignated 14 January 1955 as the 319th Military Intelligence Battalion
- Activated 7 March 1955 at Fort George G. Meade, Maryland
- Reorganized and redesignated 25 January 1958 as Headquarters and Headquarters Company, 319th Military Intelligence Battalion
- (162d Military Intelligence Company [see ANNEX 1] reorganized and redesignated 13 July 1959 as Company A)
- Battalion inactivated 15 February 1968 at Fort Shafter, Hawaii
- Activated 1 April 1982 at Fort Bragg, North Carolina (336th Army Security Agency Company [see ANNEX 2] concurrently reorganized and redesignated as Company B)

Annex 1

- Constituted 5 April 1945 in the Army of the United States as the 162d Language Detachment
- Activated 23 April 1945 in the Philippine Islands
- Inactivated 10 February 1946 in Japan
- Redesignated 14 January 1955 as the 162d Military Intelligence Platoon and allotted to the Regular Army
- Activated 7 March 1955 at Fort George G. Meade, Maryland
- Reorganized and redesignated 25 January 1958 as the 162d Military Intelligence Company

Annex 2

- Constituted 1 July 1952 in the Regular Army as the 336th Communication Reconnaissance Company
- Activated 6 August 1952 at Fort Devens, Massachusetts
- Reorganized and redesignated 16 May 1955 as Company A, 311th Communication Reconnaissance Battalion
- Redesignated 1 July 1956 as Company A, 311th Army Security Agency Battalion
- Inactivated 18 December 1957 at Camp Wolters, Texas
- Disbanded 15 February 1966
- Reconstituted 21 September 1978 in the Regular Army as the 336th Army Security Agency Company
- Activated 16 September 1979 at Fort Bragg, North Carolina

== Campaign participation credit ==
Southwest Asia: Defense of Saudi Arabia; Liberation and Defense of Kuwait

Company A additionally entitled to:

- World War II: Luzon
- Armed Forces Expeditions: Panama

== Decorations ==
- Meritorious Unit Commendation (Army) for KOREA 1953
- Meritorious Unit Commendation (Army) for SOUTHWEST ASIA 1990–1991

Operation Iraqi Freedom

- Meritorious Unit Commendation 2007
- Meritorious Unit Commendation 2009

Operation Enduring Freedom

- Meritorious Unit Commendation 2011

=== A Company ===
A Company additionally entitled to:

- Philippine Presidential Unit Citation for 17 OCTOBER 1944 TO 4 JULY 1945
