= 35th Corps Signal Brigade =

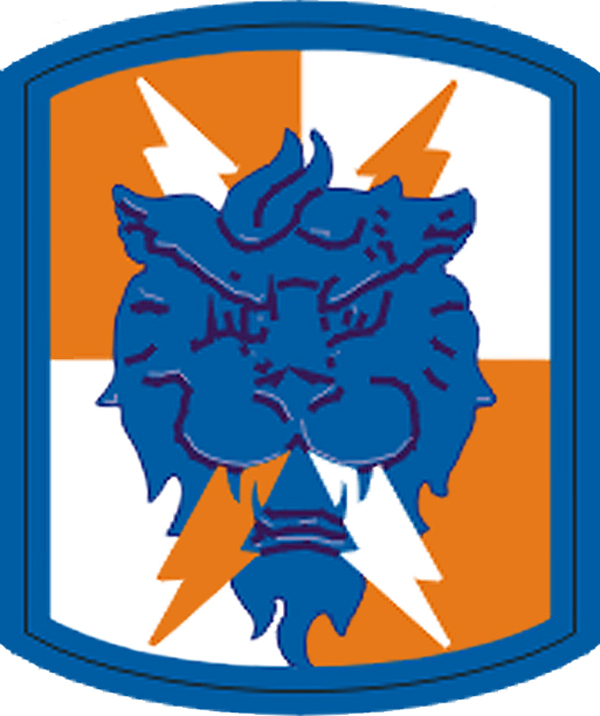
- 35th Signal Brigade Shoulder sleeve insignia
- Active: 1943–45; 1967–present
- Country: United States
- Branch: United States Army
- Role: Signals
- Size: Brigade
- Part of: XVIII Airborne Corps
- Garrison/HQ: Fort Bragg, North Carolina
- Motto: "Utmost of our Ability"
- Engagements: World War II; Operation Desert Storm; Operation Enduring Freedom; Operation Iraqi Freedom; Operation Inherent Resolve

Commanders
- Commander: COL Brian Wong
- Command Sergeant Major: CSM Christopher Quayle

Insignia
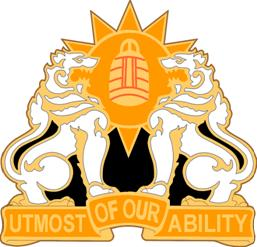
- Distinctive unit insignia

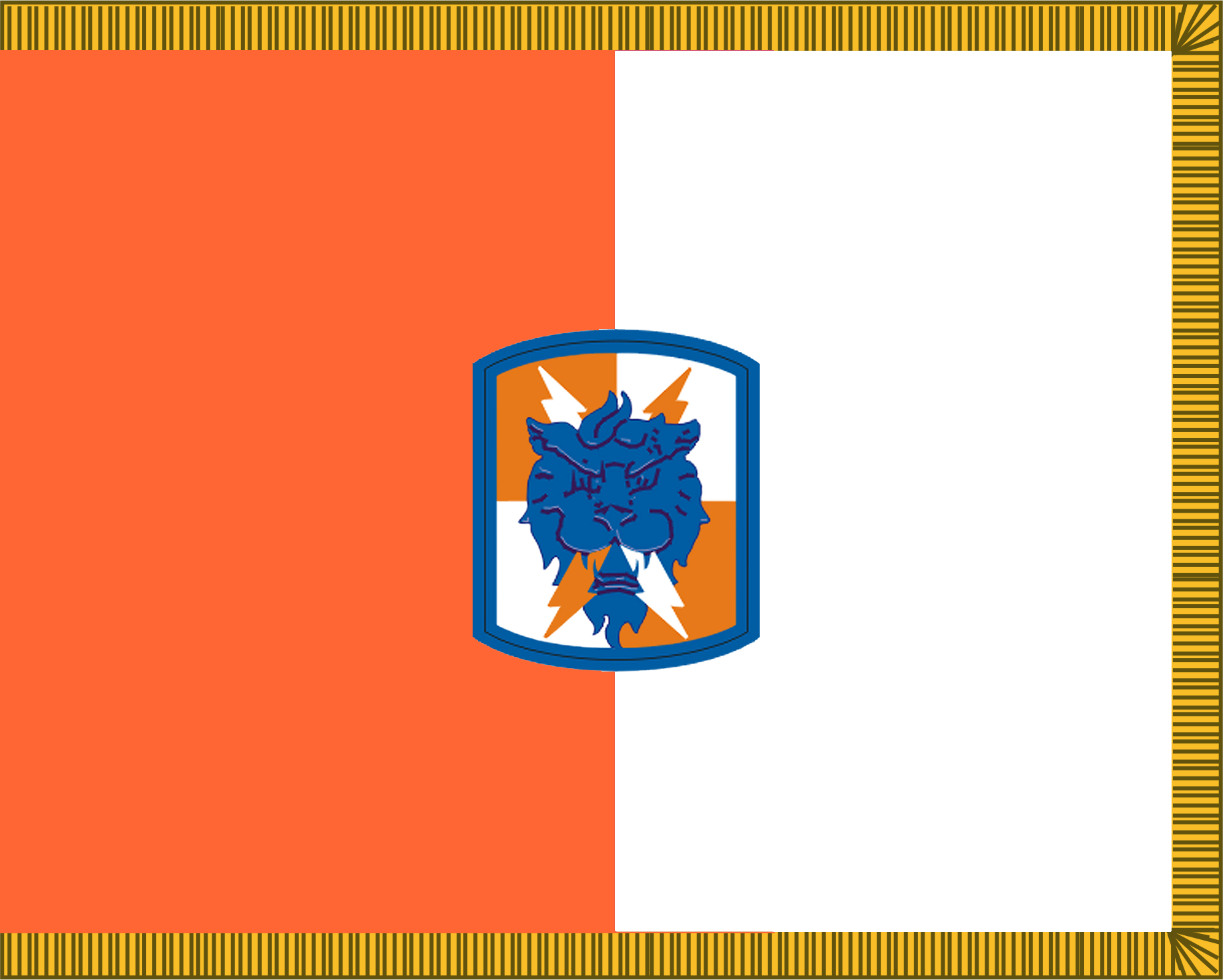
- 35th Signal Brigade

The 35th Corps Signal Brigade is a signal brigade in the United States Army. The brigade is based at Fort Bragg, North Carolina, and provides rapidly deployable force projection signal support, and rapid communications for Army, joint, and combined Operations. On 23 April 2007, the 35th Signal Brigade relocated to Fort Gordon, Georgia, and then back to Fort Bragg in 2018.

The unit returned to Fort Bragg on 14 October 2022 and was re-designated from a Theater Tactical Signal Brigade (TTSB) to a Corps Signal Brigade (CSB)

== Mission ==
The new mission statement of the 35th CSB states the unit "to deploy, install, operate, and maintain a tactical theater communications package worldwide while supporting joint and combined operations."

== Organization and history ==
- 35th Corps Signal Brigade (Fort Bragg)
  - Headquarters and Headquarters Company (Fort Bragg)
  - 50th Expeditionary Signal Battalion (Fort Bragg)
  - 63rd Expeditionary Signal Battalion (Fort Stewart)

=== Formation ===
The 35th Signal Brigade ("THE Lion Brigade!") was formed as the 931st Signal Battalion (Air Support Command) and activated on 11 January 1943 at Esler Field, Louisiana. In June 1944, the unit was reorganized and re-designated as the 931st Signal Battalion. The unit deployed to India and Burma where it provided communications to the American and British Armies. The battalion received credit for participating in India-Burma, Central Burma, and the China offensive campaigns. It also received a Meritorious Unit Citation for serving in the Asiatic-Pacific Theater. Following World War II, the 931st was deactivated in India in 1945. The 931st was reactivated 25 April 1967 and re-designated as the 35th Signal Group, based at Fort Bragg, North Carolina, where it gained airborne status.

The 35th Signal Group participated in multiple training and emergency deployment readiness exercises between 1967 and 1979 to prepare for any mission. Due to the changes in the organizational structure of the Army, the 35th Signal Group was reorganized as the 35th Signal Brigade on 16 December 1979 to support XVIII Airborne Corps level assets. In 1983, the brigade headquarters deployed to Grenada in support of Operation Urgent Fury, where elements of the brigade established communications by providing tactical satellite communications between Fort Bragg, Grenada and higher level command in CONUS. The elements of the brigade deployed to Honduras joining in-country brigade assets in support of Operation Golden Pheasant in 1988. There, the brigade supported the U.S.'s show of force mission, training missions, and humanitarian support. In 1989, the brigade participated in Operation Just Cause, and assumed operational control of all joint task force level tactical communications assets in Panama by overseeing the JTF message switching network, radio nets and ensuring AUTOVON connectivity.

=== Desert Storm and Humanitarian Operations ===
The 35th Signal Brigade deployed to Saudi Arabia in support of XVIII Airborne Corps during Operation Desert Shield / Desert Storm from 1990 to 1991. The brigade established the largest tactical satellite network ever installed in support of a corps area of operations. The brigade consisted of the 25th Signal Battalion, 50th Signal Battalion (Abn), the 327th Signal Battalion, and the 426th Signal Battalion along with attachments from the 57th Signal Battalion, 3rd Signal Brigade. The Lion Brigade received campaign participation credit for the Defense of Saudi Arabia and the Liberation and Defense of Kuwait and the Meritorious Unit Commendation award for its actions.

The brigade deployed to Florida to aid humanitarian relief efforts for victims of Hurricane Andrew in 1992, and deployed an element of troops in support of Operation Restore Hope in Somalia in 1993, which supported Army forces that secured an airfield and installations that allowed the freedom of maneuver of food and humanitarian supplies throughout the country. In 1994, the 35th Signal Brigade supported XVIII Airborne Corps during deliberate planning and the eventual deployment of US forces to Haiti. The brigade installed, operated, and maintained a sustainment base providing video-teleconference capabilities and numerous tactical satellite links to Fort Bragg. Additionally, the Unit supported efforts that protected U.S. citizens, aided the Haitian armed forces and assisted in the transition of Haiti to a democracy.

=== Afghanistan and Iraq ===
Since February 2002, the 35th Signal Brigade and its units have supported the Global War on Terrorism with multiple deployments to Operation Enduring Freedom and Operation Iraqi Freedom/Operation New Dawn. The Lion Brigade deployed to Afghanistan and Uzbekistan in support of Operation Enduring Freedom to support Combined Joint Task Force 180 and earned the Meritorious Unit Commendation award for its actions. Furthermore, the brigade earned the Meritorious Unit Commendation award for the Iraq Governance campaign of Operation Iraqi Freedom that occurred from 2004 to 2005. There, the 35th Signal Brigade deployed to Iraq to assume command and control over all Multi-National Force and Multi-National Corps Force systems. On 12 April 2007, the 35th Signal Brigade was inactivated on Fort Bragg. The next day, 13 April 2007, the brigade executed its last airborne operation from Fort Bragg with the last paratroopers of the brigade jumping into Preston Drop Zone on Fort Gordon. On 23 April 2007, as the 93d Signal Brigade at Fort Gordon, GA, cased its colors, and the brigade headquarters was reorganized and reflagged as the 35th Signal Brigade (Theater Tactical).

The unit was called to support Operation Iraqi Freedom for a second time from 2009 to 2010 during the Iraq Sovereignty campaign of Operation Iraqi Freedom. As the last tactical signal brigade in Iraq, the unit was responsible for the engineering, installation, operation, maintenance and the defense of the Iraq Theater Information Grid, and ensured a scalable and reliable command and control, communications and computers infrastructure for Coalition forces in the Iraq Joint Operating Area. The Lion Brigade received campaign participation credit and the Meritorious Unit Commendation award for its actions.

In the present day, the brigade continues to support XVIII Airborne Corps units.
