= Gary E. Luck =

Recipient of the Purple Heart medal

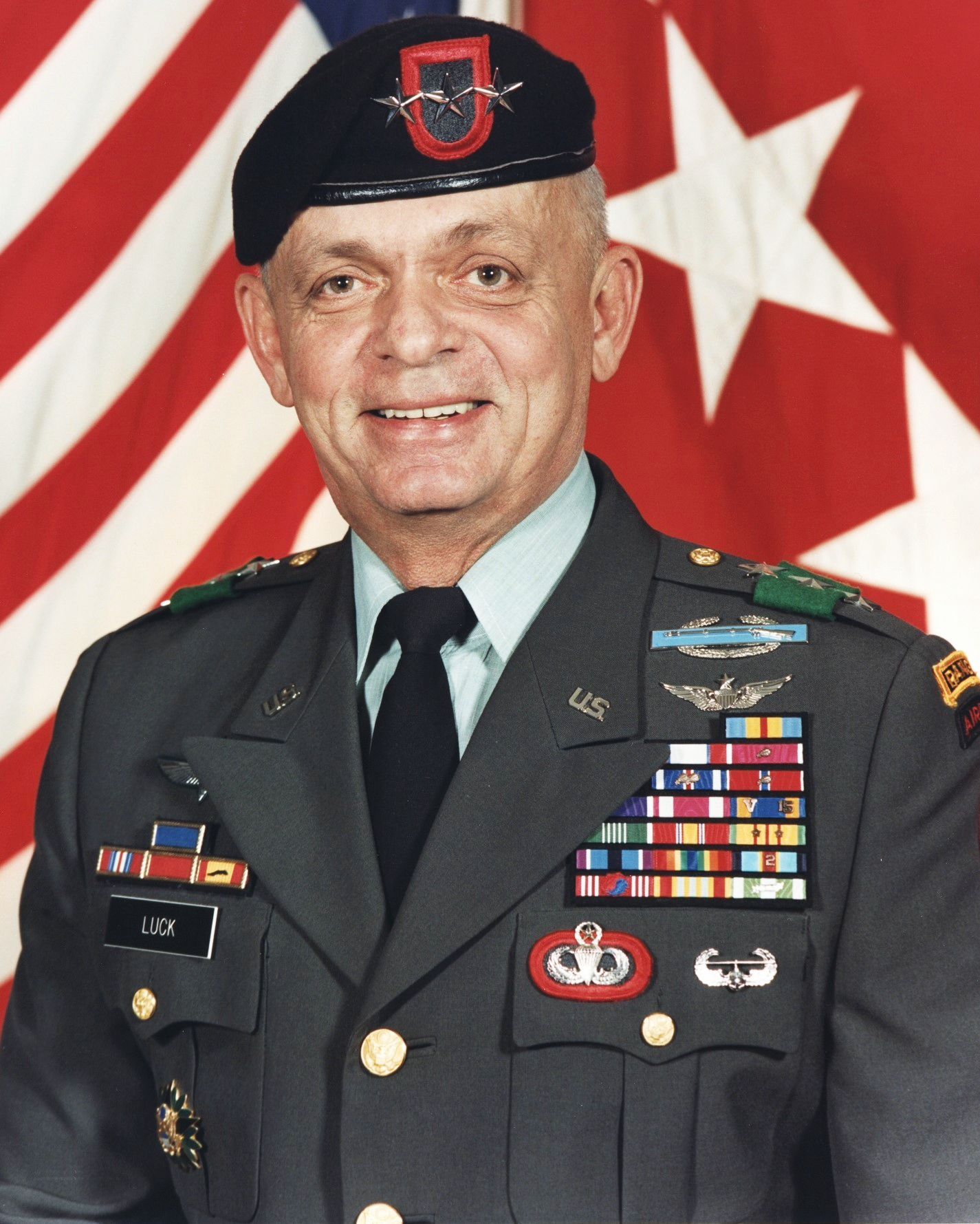
- Lieutenant General Luck in 1989
- Born: 5 August 1937; Alma, Michigan, U.S.
- Died: 14 August 2024 (aged 87); Niceville, Florida, U.S.
- Military career
- Allegiance: United States
- Branch: United States Army
- Service years: 1959–1996
- Rank: General
- Commands: United States Combined Forces Command Korea; XVIII Airborne Corps; Joint Special Operations Command; 2nd Infantry Division
- Conflicts: Vietnam War; Gulf War; 1994 North Korean nuclear crisis
- Awards: Defense Distinguished Service Medal; Army Distinguished Service Medal (2); Legion of Merit (2); Distinguished Flying Cross (4); Bronze Star Medal (3); Purple Heart

Gary Edward Luck (5 August 1937 – 14 August 2024) was a four-star general of the United States Army. Following his retirement, he was a senior advisor to the United States Joint Forces Command prior to that command's inactivation. He was a Senior Fellow for the National Defense University in support of the Pinnacle, Capstone, and Keystone programs.

== Early life and education ==
Luck was born on 5 August 1937. Receiving a bachelor's degree in engineering from Kansas State University in 1959, he held a master's degree from Florida State University and a doctorate in business administration (Operations Research and Systems Analysis, a/k/a ORSA) from George Washington University. In addition, Luck attended numerous military schools and courses, to include the Armor Basic and Advanced Officer courses, Army Aviator training, the Armed Forces Staff College, and the United States Army War College.

== Military career ==
Luck was a combat veteran of both the Vietnam War and the Gulf War and held a variety of command and staff positions throughout his Army career, to include: Chief of Staff, 8th Infantry Division, U.S. Army, Europe; Director, Force Programs, Office of the Deputy Chief of Staff for Operations and Plans, HQ Department of the Army; Assistant Division Commander, 101st Airborne Division; Commanding General, 2nd Infantry Division, Korea; Commanding General, Joint Special Operations Command (1987–1989); Commanding General, U.S. Army Special Operations Command; and Commanding General, XVIII Airborne Corps during Operation Desert Shield and Operation Desert Storm (1990–1993).

His last military assignment before retiring from active duty was as Commander-in-Chief, United Nations Command (Korea)/Combined Forces Command/United States Forces Korea. During this time the United States and North Korea nearly went to war over North Korea's development of weapons-grade plutonium at the Yongbyon nuclear facility and threat to withdraw from the Nuclear Non-Proliferation Treaty. Luck warned President Bill Clinton that a renewal of the Korean conflict would cost "A million, a hundred billion, and a trillion," meaning 1 million American casualties, $100 billion in economic costs to the United States, and $1 trillion in industrial damage to South Korea. The crisis was ultimately defused by the successful negotiation of the USA-DPRK Agreed Framework, but North Korea eventually acquired nuclear weapons.

General Luck, then a major general, served as officer in charge of Operation Pocket Planner in November 1987, where members of the United States Army Special Operations Command responded to the Atlanta prison riots.

== Post-military life ==
After his retirement from the Army, Luck served in a variety of senior advisory positions in support of the United States Department of Defense, overseeing exercise control during Exercise Millennium Challenge 2002, and as an advisor to then-Commander of United States Central Command, General Tommy Franks, prior to the US led invasion of Iraq in 2003. He was sent back to Iraq in early 2005 in order to investigate various areas of operation, identifying any weaknesses and reporting back to commanders at The Pentagon with a confidential assessment on what could be done to install democracy in Iraq and to set a date for the withdrawal of American and coalition forces. That same year, Luck was also the 2005 recipient of the Doughboy Award from the National Infantry Association.

Luck died in Niceville, Florida, on 14 August 2024, at the age of 87.

== Awards and decorations ==
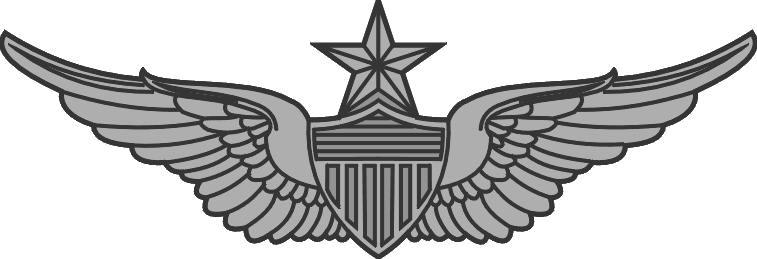
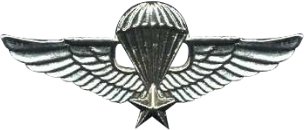
Combat Infantryman Badge
Senior Army Aviator Badge
Master Parachutist Badge
Air Assault Badge
Ranger Tab
Vietnamese Parachutist Badge
Army Staff Identification Badge

Defense Distinguished Service Medal
Army Distinguished Service Medal with one bronze oak leaf cluster
Legion of Merit with oak leaf cluster
Distinguished Flying Cross with three oak leaf clusters
Bronze Star Medal with two oak leaf clusters
Purple Heart
Meritorious Service Medal
Air Medal with Valor device and bronze award numerals 15
Army Commendation Medal
Army Presidential Unit Citation
Valorous Unit Award
Army Meritorious Unit Commendation
National Defense Service Medal with one bronze service star
Vietnam Service Medal with one silver service star
Southwest Asia Service Medal with two bronze service stars
Humanitarian Service Medal
Army Service Ribbon
Army Overseas Service Ribbon with award numeral 3
Order of National Security Merit, Tong-il Medal (Republic of Korea)
Vietnam Armed Forces Honor Medal with service star (2nd class)
King Faisal Award, 2nd class
French Legion of Honour, Officer
Vietnam Gallantry Cross Unit Citation
Vietnam Campaign Medal
Kuwait Liberation Medal (Saudi Arabia)
Kuwait Liberation Medal (Kuwait)
