= 525th Military Intelligence Brigade =

- 525th Military Intelligence Brigade shoulder sleeve insignia
- Active: 1948?-present
- Country: United States
- Branch: United States Army
- Type: Intelligence
- Size: Brigade
- Part of: XVIII Airborne Corps
- Garrison/HQ: Fort Bragg
- Engagements: Vietnam War; Operation Just Cause; Operation Desert Storm; Operation Uphold Democracy; Operation Iraqi Freedom; Operation Enduring Freedom; Operation Joint Guardian

Commanders
- Commander: Colonel Amanda Hughes
- Current Command Sergeant Major: CSM Edson Rodriguez

Insignia
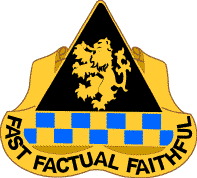
- Distinctive unit insignia of the brigade

- Former beret flash of the 525th Military Intelligence Brigade (Airborne)

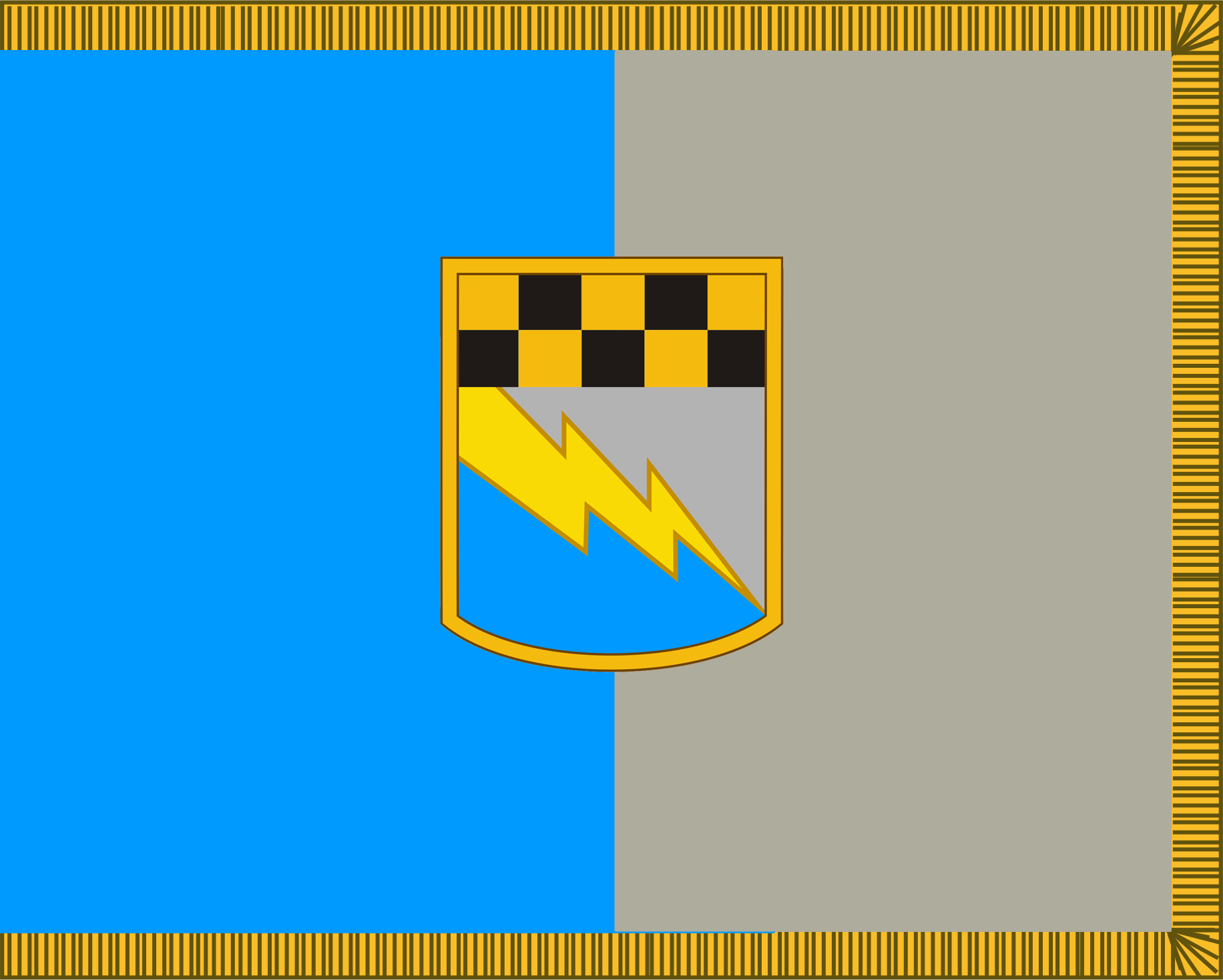
- 525th Military Intelligence Brigade Flag

The 525th Military Intelligence Brigade is a United States Army unit specializing in the collection and analysis of information with potential military value. On 28 October 2014, the unit was reflagged from the "525th Battlefield Surveillance Brigade" to an expeditionary military intelligence brigade, the first of its kind.

== Mission ==
The 525th Military Intelligence Brigade provides intelligence to commanders at the corps or lower levels. The unit is designed to be adaptable and able to deploy as part of the Global Response Force, or in support of any number of operations across the globe. As the only rapidly-deployable military intelligence (MI) brigade in the United States Army, the 525th specializes in intelligence collection and analysis support to the XVIII Airborne Corps. The brigade headquarters and two MI battalions are stationed at Fort Bragg, North Carolina. The brigade's capabilities include a full range of advanced intelligence collection and analysis that includes human intelligence, counterintelligence, aerial signals intelligence, and Tactical Exploitation of National Capabilities (TENCAP), as well as electronic warfare support. Its Soldiers come from across the range of Military Occupational Specialties in the Army to include military intelligence disciplines, aviation, signal, and the full range of critical Combat Support and Combat Service Support experts. Its mission is to provide all-source, predictive intelligence and electronic warfare in support of worldwide contingency operations.

== History ==
The 525th Military Intelligence Brigade traces its lineage back to World War II: the 218th Counter Intelligence Corps Detachment and the 525th Interrogation Team. These units were deactivated after World War II. On 21 February 1948, the 525th Headquarters Intelligence Detachment was reactivated and assigned to Fort Bragg, North Carolina. It was redesignated the 525th Military Intelligence Service Group in December 1950. During the Korean War, elements of the Group participated in seven campaigns and earned a Meritorious Unit Commendation and two Republic of Korea Presidential Unit Citations. In December 1953, the unit was redesigned again as the 525th Military Intelligence Group, and was transferred from Fort Bragg to Fort George G. Meade, Maryland.

Upon arrival in South Vietnam, in November 1965, the 525th Military Intelligence Group was assigned to the U.S. Army, Vietnam. There, the Group provided advisor and intelligence support to include aerial reconnaissance and surveillance, counterintelligence, interrogation, technical intelligence, and area intelligence (espionage in support of USARV). After Vietnam, the Group moved several times. On 16 September 1978, it returned to Fort Bragg, North Carolina where it was redesignated as the 525th Military Intelligence Brigade (Airborne).

In December 1989, the brigade participated, once again, in a rapid deployment operation, providing critical intelligence support to Joint Task Force (JTF) during Operation Just Cause. Brigade soldiers interrogated key Panamanian Defense Force members, screened documents, and served as the nucleus of the JTF Panama J2. The soldiers who served with JTF Panama, J2, received the Joint Meritorious Unit Commendation award.

Operation Desert Shield deployments began in early August 1990. The brigade sent over 1,600 soldiers in support of XVIII Airborne Corps. Missions included all source analysis to Corps Headquarters and subordinate units, interrogating over 5,000 enemy prisoners of war, flying over 550 combat intelligence collection missions, collecting signals intelligence, providing communications jamming support, conducting long range surveillance operations, and augmenting the 6th French Light Armored Division.

The brigade also deployed to Haiti in support of Operation Uphold Democracy. The brigade task force conducted split-based operations which provided signals intelligence and direct support teams to the maneuver brigades. The brigade also provided imagery support, intelligence analysis support, signals intelligence analysis, and national imagery support to the headquarters of both Joint Task Forces (JTF) 180 and 190. The task force also used its counter-intelligence/human intelligence teams and established and ran the joint detainee facility in support of JTF-190.

From late 2004 to late 2008, 525th MI Brigade deployed several times to Iraq in support of XVIII Airborne Corps, which was serving as the Multinational Corps-Iraq for the majority of 525th's deployment. Upon returning from Iraq, the brigade began the process of reorganizing into the 525th Battlefield Surveillance Brigade. The largest change was that the Analysis and Control Element was detached and became attached to the Corps G2 staff section. For its participation in Operation Iraqi Freedom from 16 November 2004 until 15 November 2005, the 525th received a Meritorious Unit Commendation.

=== OIF 04-05 Order of Battle ===
- 525th Military Intelligence Brigade
  - 319th Military Intelligence Battalion
  - 297th Military Intelligence Battalion
  - 519th Military Intelligence Battalion
  - 250th Military Intelligence Battalion
  - 1st Military Intelligence Battalion Attached

Concurrent with the reorganization and redesignation as the 525th Battlefield Surveillance Brigade, the Airborne tab was deleted from the shoulder sleeve insignia effective 16 March 2009.

The brigade is deployed in support of Operation Joint Guardian as Multinational Battle Group East part of the NATO Kosovo Force (KFOR) (525 BfSB) and is headquartered at Camp Bondsteel, Kosovo. The Multinational Battle Group East additionally has multiple Regular Army, National Guard, Reserve component forces and has 12 different Multinational units.

In October 2014, the brigade was the first of three brigades reorganized and re-designated as Military Intelligence Brigades (Expeditionary) to better support the requirements of the U.S. Army during a time of shrinking budgets and reduction in personnel. The biggest change to the brigade was the loss of the 1st Squadron, 38th Cavalry Regiment leaving only two battalions under it, the 319th Military Intelligence Battalion and the 519th Military Intelligence Battalion.

Following the outbreak of the 2022 Russian invasion of Ukraine, the brigade was deployed to Rzeszów, Poland.

== Subordinate units ==
=== 103rd Intelligence and Electronic Warfare Battalion ===
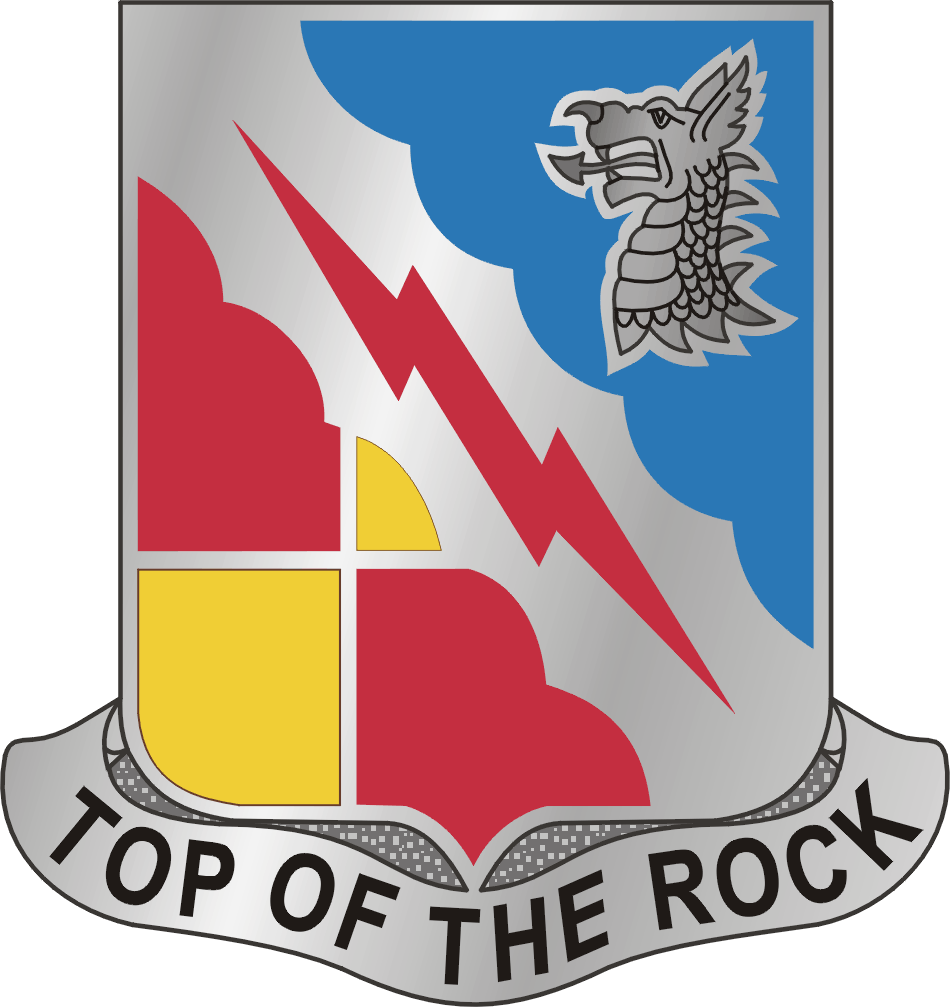

The 103rd Intelligence and Electronic Warfare Battalion (103rd IEW Battalion) is a United States Army military intelligence and electronic warfare battalion which serves as a direct subordinate unit to the 3rd Infantry Division.

The battalion was activated in Germany and designated as the 103rd Military Intelligence Battalion on 16 September 1981, after the U.S. Army directed the merger of the 851st Army Security Agency Company, and the 3rd Military Intelligence Company. As such, the 103rd Military Intelligence Battalion draws its lineage and honors from these two historical units. In the summer of 1996 the Battalion along with the 3rd Infantry Division (Mechanized), relocated to Fort Stewart, Georgia.

The 851st Army Security Agency Company was originally formed as the 3377th Signal Service Detachment which was activated in January 1945 on Luzon in the Philippines. In October 1951 the 851st Communications Reconnaissance Detachment, participating in four Korean War campaigns, including the first United Nations counteroffensive. The detachment was deactivated in Japan in August 1956. That same year it was briefly reactivated as the 851st Army Security Agency Detachment. It was finally designated the 851st Army Security Agency Company and reactivated in July 1974.

The 3rd Military Intelligence Company was activated in France in September 1944 as the 3rd Counterintelligence Corps. It was inactivated 2 years later after having participated in four World War II campaigns, including Rhineland and Ardennes-Alsace. In 1949, the detachment was reactivated and served in the Korean War. It participated in 8 campaigns including the Chinese Communist Force Intervention and the second and third Korean Winters. During January 1958, the detachment was reorganized and redesignated as the 3rd Military Intelligence detachment and attached to the 3rd Infantry Division. The detachment was assigned to the 3rd Infantry Division in April 1974.

The 103rd Military Intelligence Battalion, as part of the 3rd Infantry Division participated in the first iteration of Operation Iraqi Freedom. At the orders of the President of the United States, the 3rd Infantry Division already had a Brigade-sized element in Iraq for a year prior to the start of the war and Company B, 103rd MI BN was part of that brigade.[5] In late summer/early fall of 2002, the 103rd MI BN sent more forces into Kuwait in anticipation of combat operations. By 27 January the entire battalion was on the ground and conducting intelligence operations. The battalion, equipped with the AN/MLQ 40 PROPHET system, began collecting signals intelligence on the Iraqi Forces.[6] On 20 March 2003, the battalion joined the division in the attack with its direct support companies (A, B, C) providing support to each of the 3rd Infantry Division Brigade Combat Teams, and Company D, and HHOC providing support to the division as a whole. The battalion would participate in a number of operations including seizing OBJ LION (Saddam International Airport), and follow-on operations to Fallujah, Iraq before redeploying in Aug 2003.

It was reactivated 16 September 2022, after an 18-year hiatus resulting from the elimination of all division-level intelligence units.

=== 319th Military Intelligence Battalion ===
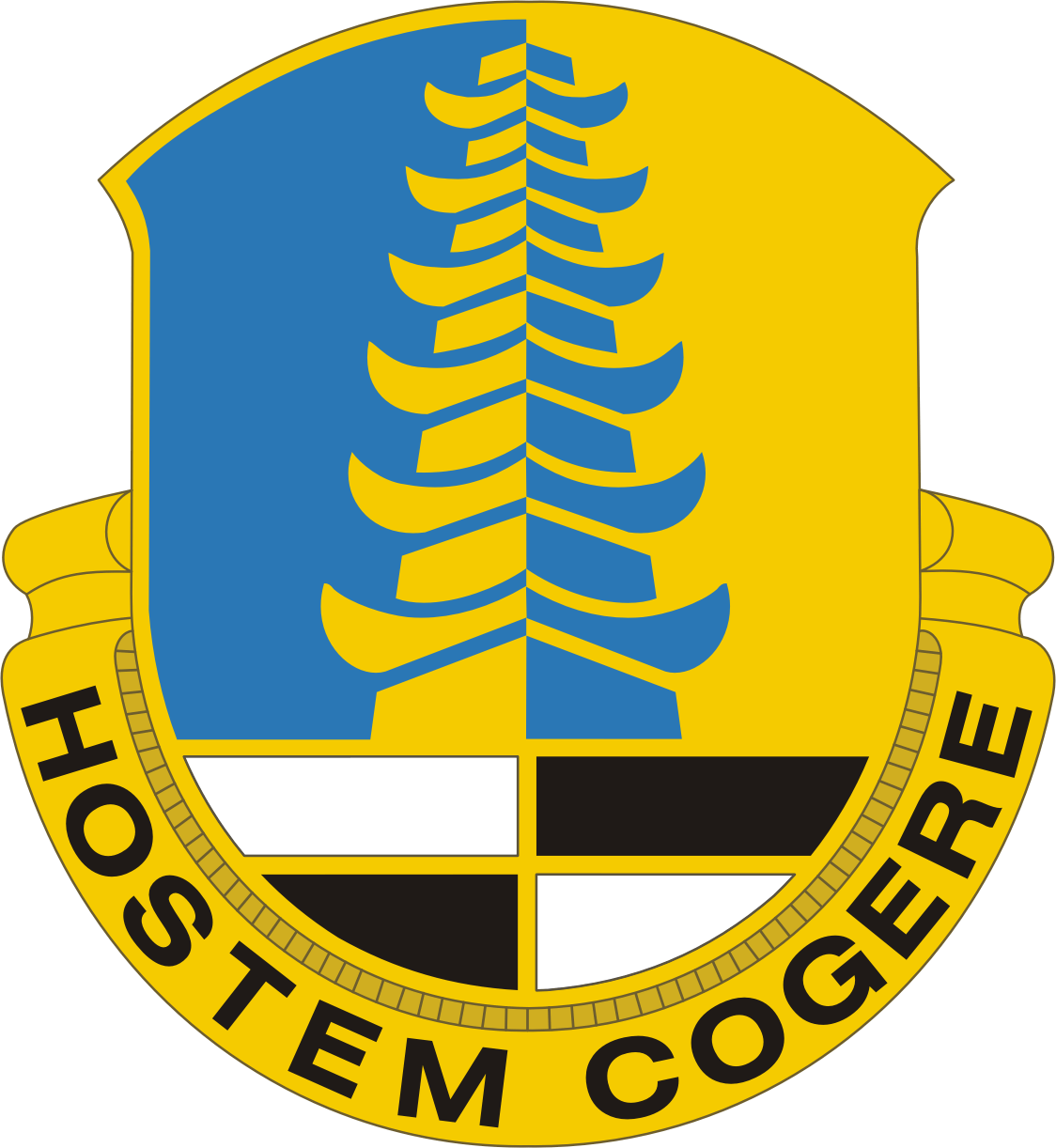

The 319th Military Intelligence Battalion (Operations) traces its lineage to the activation of the 319th Military Intelligence Headquarters Detachment at Bad Schwalbach, Germany, 1 August 1945 where it served as an interrogation unit for German Prisoners of War. In 1946, the unit was sent to Japan and began a long association with the Orient. It was joined by other interrogation units which served in the Philippines in 1944 and later the reformed 319th served in the Korean War. After deactivation in 1968, the battalion was reactivated in 1982 at Fort Bragg, North Carolina, as a subordinate unit of the 525th Military Intelligence Brigade to provide both general intelligence support and special communications support to the XVIII Airborne Corps. In October 1983, elements of the battalion deployed to the island of Grenada for Operation Urgent Fury. In 1988, battalion personnel participated in the emergency deployment to Honduras to counter an incursion by Nicaraguan forces. In 1989, the 319th deployed to Panama in support of Operation Just Cause. The 319th MI Battalion deployed to Saudi Arabia for Operation Desert Shield as part of the XVIII Airborne Corps. In September 1994, the battalion deployed to the island of Haiti in support of Operation Uphold Democracy. In December 1995 and again in October 1996, the battalion deployed elements to Hungary, Italy, and Bosnia in support of Operation Joint Endeavor. In March 2003, the Battalion's B Co (TENCAP) deployed to Operation Iraqi Freedom in support of the 1st Marine Expeditionary Force(MEF). The 525th MI BDE consisting of both the 319th/519th battalions deployed in support of Operation Operation Iraqi Freedom in 2005 and 2007.

The battalion deployed in support of Operation Enduring Freedom as part of Combined Task Force Lightning (525 BfSB). The battalion deployed in July 2010 and returned to Fort Bragg, North Carolina in July 2011. While deployed the battalion was headquartered out of the Kandahar City area of RC-South, Afghanistan.

In January 2013 the 319th Military Intelligence Battalion again deployed to Afghanistan. This time they operated out of RC-East, Afghanistan. The battalion returned to Fort Bragg, North Carolina in October 2013.

=== 519th Military Intelligence Battalion ===
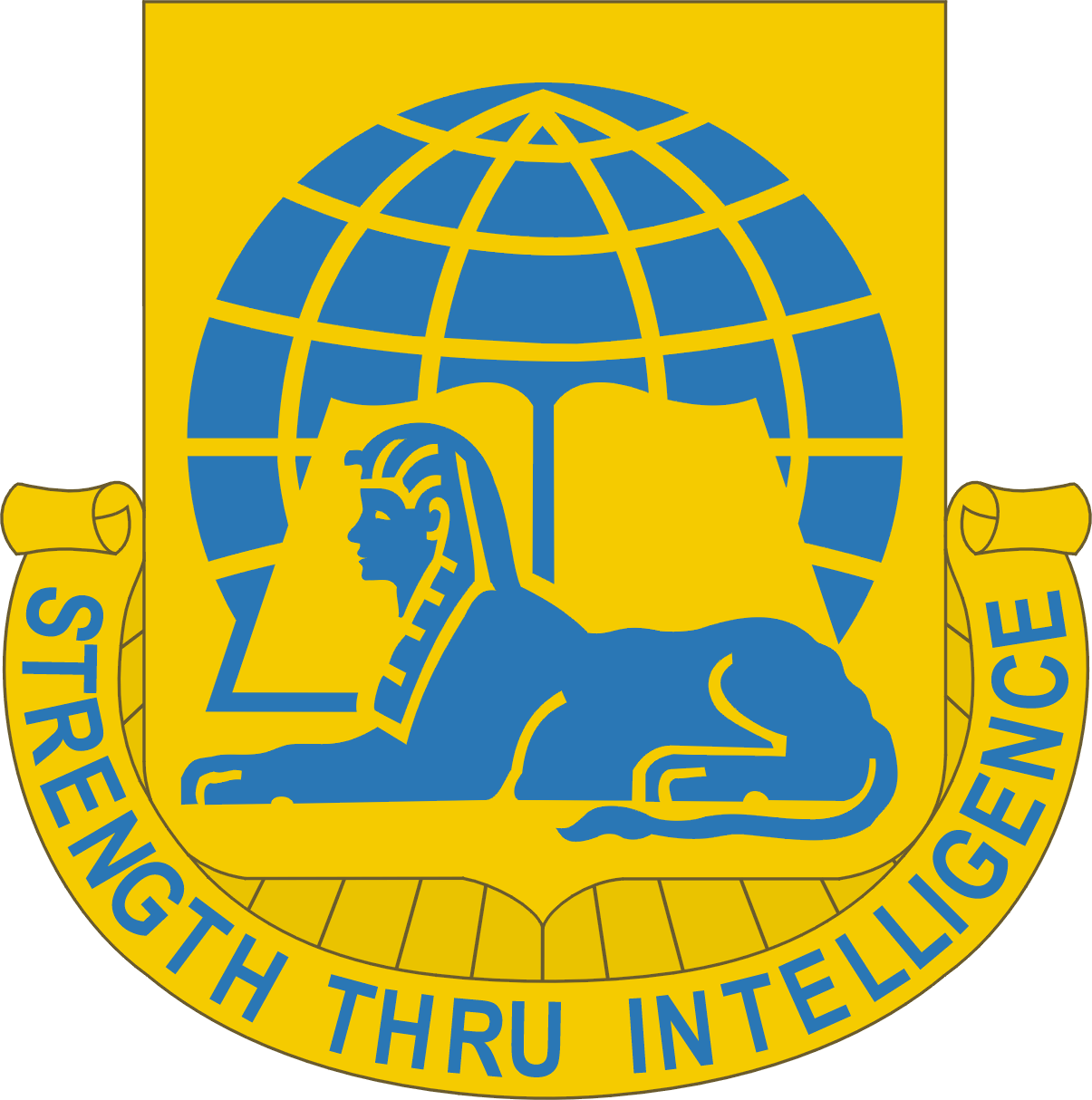

The 519th Military Intelligence Battalion was activated on 15 October 1948 at Fort Riley, Kansas. The battalion's motto is "Strength Through Intelligence."

The 519th Military Intelligence Battalion, a subordinate unit of the 525th Battlefield Surveillance Brigade, provides tactical HUMINT; long range reconnaissance and surveillance; counterintelligence; interrogation; multi-functional collection and exploitation; and SIGINT support within assigned areas of the division, corps, joint task force (JTF) or multinational force area of operations.

Elements of the battalion served in the Republic of Korea from 1951 until 1954, participating in seven campaigns and earning one Meritorious Unit Commendation and two Republic of Korea Presidential Unit Citations. The battalion was inactivated in 1954. On 25 January 1958, the 519th Military Intelligence (MI) Battalion (BN) (Aircorn (ACN)) was reactivated at Fort Bragg, North Carolina. In May 1965, the 519th MI BN (ACN) deployed to the Dominican Republic for Operation Powersack, where it supported the 82nd Airborne Division and the US Marines in combating the communist insurgency on the Caribbean island. In late summer of 1965, the 519th MI BN redeployed back to Fort Bragg, North Carolina, and subsequently deployed to the Republic of Vietnam in November 1965. During the Vietnam War, the battalion again left the United States and distinguished itself by participating in sixteen campaigns and earning three Meritorious Unit Commendations.

In 1972, the battalion returned to Fort Bragg. After several reorganizations, the battalion officially achieved a three-company configuration in September 1978, with Headquarters, Headquarters & Service Company; Company A (Interrogation); and Company B (Counterintelligence).

In 1975, elements of the 519th MI BN were used to create the Forces Command Intelligence Training Detachment [FITD], which was formed and commanded by Captain Gregory MLP Davis. Personnel were also drawn from the 1st MI Battalion and the 218th MI Detachment. FITD was in direct support of Forces Command Headquarters, but attached to the 525th Intelligence Group.

The FITD mission was to develop and deliver tactical intelligence training to National Guard and Reserve MI units using mobile training teams (MTT) and creating skill sets through hands-on training in the form of both platform instruction and command post exercises (CPX), with the trained unit functioning with the brigade, division, or corps it supported ("bringing training to the unit"). Training was very realistic since it was "all-source" and the materials included "live" orders of battle, SIGINT and COMINT, actual imagery of the region, and POW role players who were actual interrogators responding in foreign languages, plus tactical CI reports drawn from foreign liaison and clandestine operations.

The training was so successful and effective that FORSCOM extended the mission to include active duty MI units and intelligence staffs at divisions and corps. In 1977, FITD conducted the largest intelligence command post exercise in the history of the US Army for the III Corps, and included active duty and National Guard divisions as well as active duty and Army Reserve MI units engaged in a classified CPX in which Iraq was the aggressor against Jordan. The training was constantly updated based on problem resolution from each exercise, and the SOPs developed were integrated into the US Army Training and Doctrine Command curriculum.

The innovative training included, for the first time, tasking by tactical intelligence units of strategic assets such as USAF SR-71 reconnaissance missions, NRO overhead imagery, and signals intelligence from NSA. The concept of tactical counterintelligence was also introduced, converting CI agents, previously dedicated to conducting security investigations, to the role of tactical agent handlers and case officers. Also introduced was the concept of the rear area operations center in theater commands, which integrated multi-service intelligence and military police personnel into a tactical analysis and rapid response unit to address terrorists and Soviet Spetsnaz commando assaults.

FITD was later transferred from FORSCOM to TRADOC, and in 1987, was relocated from Fort Bragg to Fort Huachuca, where it was re-designated the 111th Military Intelligence Brigade. Captain Davis later (1984) formed and directed the operations of the Clandestine Services organization under the DOD HUMINT program.

On 16 April 1982, the battalion was reorganized and redesignated the 519th Military Intelligence Battalion (Tactical Exploitation) (Airborne), resulting in the activation of Company C (Electronic Warfare).

The battalion participated in combat operations in Grenada (Operation Urgent Fury) in November 1983, Panama (Operation Just Cause) in December 1989, and in the Kuwaiti theater of operations (Operation Desert Shield and Operation Desert Storm) and was subordinate to the 525th MI Brigade (CEWI) (ACN) as part of the XVIII Airborne Corps, under 3rd US Army during the deployment in the KTO from August 1990 to March 1991.

During the 1990s, the 519th MI BN participated in peacekeeping operations in Haiti (Operation Restore Democracy), Bosnia (Operations Joint Endeavor and Joint Forge) and Kosovo (Operation Joint Guardian). The 519th MI BN also deployed tactical human intelligence teams to Somalia in support of Operation Restore Hope.

In 1995, Company C was inactivated and Company F, 51st Infantry Regiment (Long Range Surveillance) was assigned to the battalion to provide the corps with long range surveillance capability. About 2007, during the reconfiguration of the 525th MI Brigade to a battlefield surveillance brigade (BfSB), Company F (LRS), 51st Infantry Regiment, with its LRS desgnation removed. Was reflagged as Troop C, 1st Squadron, 38th Cavalry Regiment (1–38th CAV) and was removed from the control of the 519th MI BN and reassigned to 1–38th CAV, which is another subordinate squadron in the 525th BfSB.

During the Global War on Terrorism, 519th MI BN repeatedly deployed for combat operations in both Afghanistan and Iraq. The 519th MI BN served in Operation Enduring Freedom (OEF) I, OEF III, OEF IV, Operation Iraqi Freedom (OIF) I, OIF IV and OEF XII.

In 2005, some members of the unit were involved in the Abu Ghraib torture and prisoner abuse scandal.

The battalion was redeployed back to Fort Bragg, NC after serving in Afghanistan in support of Operation Enduring Freedom XI from July 2010 to July 2011 under the command of LTC Anthony "Jabroni" Hale as part of Combined Joint Task Force 101. While in Afghanistan, the 519th MI Battalion was headquartered at Bagram Airbase, Afghanistan, with its units deployed throughout Regional Command East.

In 2015, the 519th and 319th Military Intelligence Battalions were redesignated as expeditionary military intelligence battalions, the first units of their kind in the Army. As part of the transformation, the C Company for each battalion was deactivated.

== Former subordinate units ==
=== 302nd Intelligence and Electronic Warfare Battalion ===
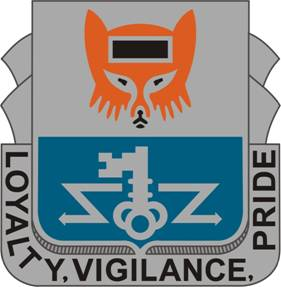

The 302nd Military Intelligence Battalion (302nd MI BN), whose unit crest portrays the "sly fox", evolved from the 3252d Signal Service Company which was activated in England on 1 April 1944.

The 3252nd saw service in France and Germany before returning to Camp Kilmer, New Jersey, where it was deactivated in 1945. The unit was awarded battle credits for participation in the Invasion of Normandy. The 3252nd was re-designated the 533rd Signal Service Company in 1948 and served until 1949 in Salzburg, Austria.

In 1950, the 533rd Signal Service Company was re-designated the 302nd Communications Reconnaissance Battalion. It was assigned to the Army Security Agency and activated at Camp Pickett, Virginia. The unit departed Camp Pickett in 1951 to Fort Hood, Texas in 1952. In August 1952, the unit departed for Germany. In 1957, the 302nd was deactivated in Germany.

In 1975, the 302nd was reactivated in Germany and assigned to the 502nd Army Security Agency (ASA) in support of V Corps. In 1977, the battalion was transferred from the Army Security Agency to United States Army Europe (USAREUR).

In 1984, the 302nd was reorganized as the 302nd Military Intelligence Battalion, and subordinated to the 205th Military Intelligence Group of V Corps under the Combat Electronics Warfare Intelligence (CEWI) Concept. In 1985, the 302nd was subordinated from the 205th Military Intelligence Group to the 205th Military Intelligence Brigade.

In August 1990, a detachment deployed to Saudi Arabia for Operations Desert Shield and Desert Storm.[1] Through the nineties, the 302nd deployed to the Balkans and was awarded the Superior Unit Award.[2]

As part of V Corps, the 302nd deployed to Iraq for Operation Iraqi Freedom in 2003 and a subsequent rotation. The unit was awarded two Meritorious Unit Commendations.

In 2007, the 302nd began its transformation into the 24th Military Intelligence Battalion. With the deactivation of the 205th Military Intelligence Brigade, in October 2007, the 302nd was assigned to USAREUR and attached to the 66th Military Intelligence Group.

In 2023, the 302nd was reactivated as the 302nd Intelligence and Electronic Warfare (IEW) Battalion at Fort Campbell under the 525th Military Intelligence Brigade, supporting the 101st Airborne Division.

In 2024, the 302nd IEW Battalion was transferred directly to the 101st Airborne Division as part of U.S. Army's 2030 transformation plan.

=== 29th Brigade Support Company (29th BSC) ===
The 29th Brigade Support Company is a multifunctional logistics company that was activated on 26 October 2006, commanded by then CPT Jeffrey J. Ignatowski. Its primary mission is to provide quality field maintenance and to distribute all classes of supply, except medical, to the 525th BfSB. The company first deployed in 2007, in support of Operation Iraqi Freedom 07–09.

The company deployed in July 2010 in support of Operation Enduring Freedom as part of Combined Task Force Lightning (525 BfSB) and was headquartered out of Kandahar Airfield until January 2011. The company was then moved to FOB Spin Boldak for the remainder of the tour. The unit redeployed in July 2011.

The 29th BSC was inactivated in 2015.

=== 586th Network Support Company (586th NSC) ===
This Company provides tactical communication and automation support for the brigade.

The company is deployed in support of Operation Enduring Freedom as part of Combined Task Force Lightning (525BfSB) and is headquartered out of RC-South, Afghanistan.

=== 224th Military Intelligence Battalion (Aerial Exploitation) ===
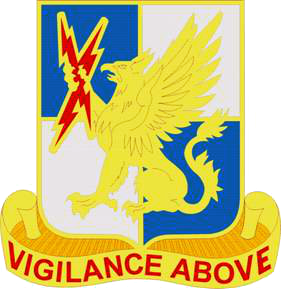

The 224th Aviation Battalion (Radio Research) was activated in Saigon, South Vietnam, on 1 June 1966. The battalion and its four subordinate companies began with on 6 aircraft and 159 personnel, but quickly expanded in size. In July 1967, the battalion reached its highest strength of 1,066 personnel, and within two years had 30 aircraft assigned. On 19 May 1971, the battalion was redesignated as the 224th Army Security Agency Aviation Battalion. The battalion participated in fifteen campaigns and received three awards of the Meritorious Unit Commendation, along with the Vietnamese Cross of Gallantry with Palm during its service in the Vietnam War. On 3 March 1973, the colors of the battalion were transferred to Oakland, California, and the unit was formally inactivated. On 1 June 1981, the unit was reactivated as the 224th Military Intelligence Battalion (Aerial Exploitation). The battalion is stationed at Hunter Army Airfield, Georgia, and is organized with a Headquarters and Headquarters Service Company and Company B (Electronic Warfare).

On 15 October 1997, Company A (Aerial Surveillance) was deactivated. From February 1984 to January 1990, the battalion provided continuous support to the U.S. Southern Command from an OCONUS operating base, conducting aerial intelligence collection missions from its C Company (Provisional). In 1984 and in 1987, the 224th Military Intelligence Battalion won the National Security Agency Director's Trophy for its excellence as a tactical cryptologic unit. As a subordinate unit of the 525th Battlefield Surveillance Brigade, the 224th Military Intelligence Battalion provides the highest quality aerial reconnaissance and surveillance support to the XVIII Airborne Corps and Corps' Major subordinate commands. The unit has elements deployed in support of operations in Europe, Southwest Asia, and the Gulf of Mexico.

=== 1st Squadron, 38th Cavalry Regiment (Inactivated 2014) ===
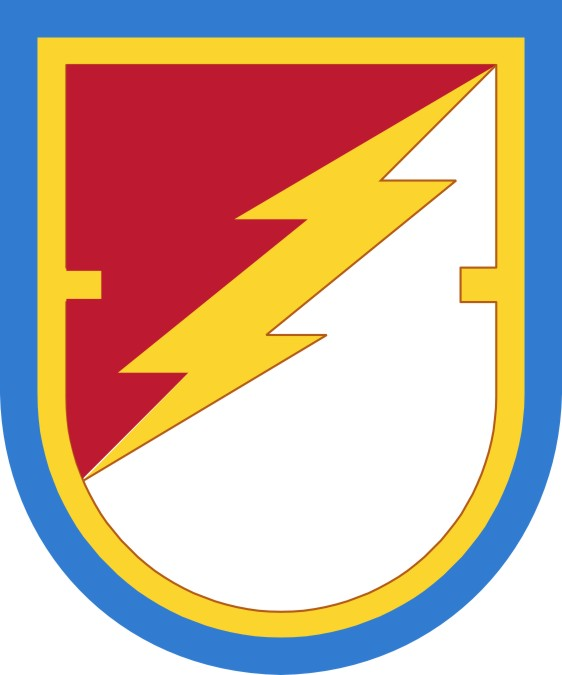

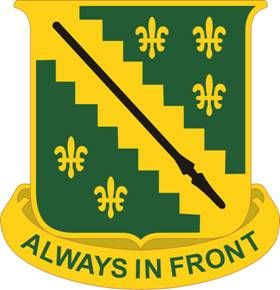

According to the US Army Center of Military History (CMH) at Fort McNair in Washington, DC, the 1st Squadron, 38th Cavalry Regiment was activated on 16 March 2009, and a ceremony marking the activation was held on 21 May 2009. The unit consists of a Headquarters and Headquarters Troop, two ground troops (Troops A and B), and a long range surveillance unit, Troop C. (Although locally called a company, the CMH has confirmed its actual designation is "Troop C.")

Company F (LRS), 51st Infantry Regiment was inactivated effective 15 March 2009 and its remnants were used to form Troop C, 1–38th CAV. Following its inactivation at Fort Bragg, the unit designation was reactivated on 16 January 2011 at Fort Bliss, Texas, as Company F (Anti-Tank), 51st Infantry Regiment, a unit of the 1st Brigade Combat Team, 1st Armored Division.

Troop C requested to have the lineage of its predecessor, Company F (LRS), 51st Infantry Regiment, as its lineage. HQDA disapproved of the request and replied, "HQDA approved MTOE does not allow for a separate infantry company. As documented, the company is a subordinate of 1–38th CAV and as such will carry the designation of Troop C, 1–38th CAV." Although formed from the assets of Company F, 51st Infantry Regiment, the new unit, Troop C, 1–38th CAV, has an entirely different lineage, and the lineage of F-51st has gone to the new unit at Fort Bliss. This anti-tank company has an authorized strength of 6 officers, 0 warrant officers, and 48 enlisted. The previous Company F, as an LRS unit, had 7 officers, 0 warrant officers, and 136 enlisted.

The 1st Squadron, 38th CAV deployed in July 2010 in support of Operation Enduring Freedom as part of Combined Task Force Lightning (525th BfSB) under the International Security Assistance Force or ISAF that is part of NATO and is based in the south area of Kandahar, overwatching the Afghanistan-Pakistan border.

Company F, 51st Infantry Regiment was inactivated on 15 November 2013 at Fort Bliss, Texas, and relieved from assignment to the 1st Brigade Combat Team, 1st Armored Division.

== Decorations ==
Operation Iraqi Freedom

- Meritorious Unit Commendation – 2007

== Specialties ==
- Languages and Translation
- counter-intelligence
- interrogation
