= Joint United States Military Advisory Group Thailand =

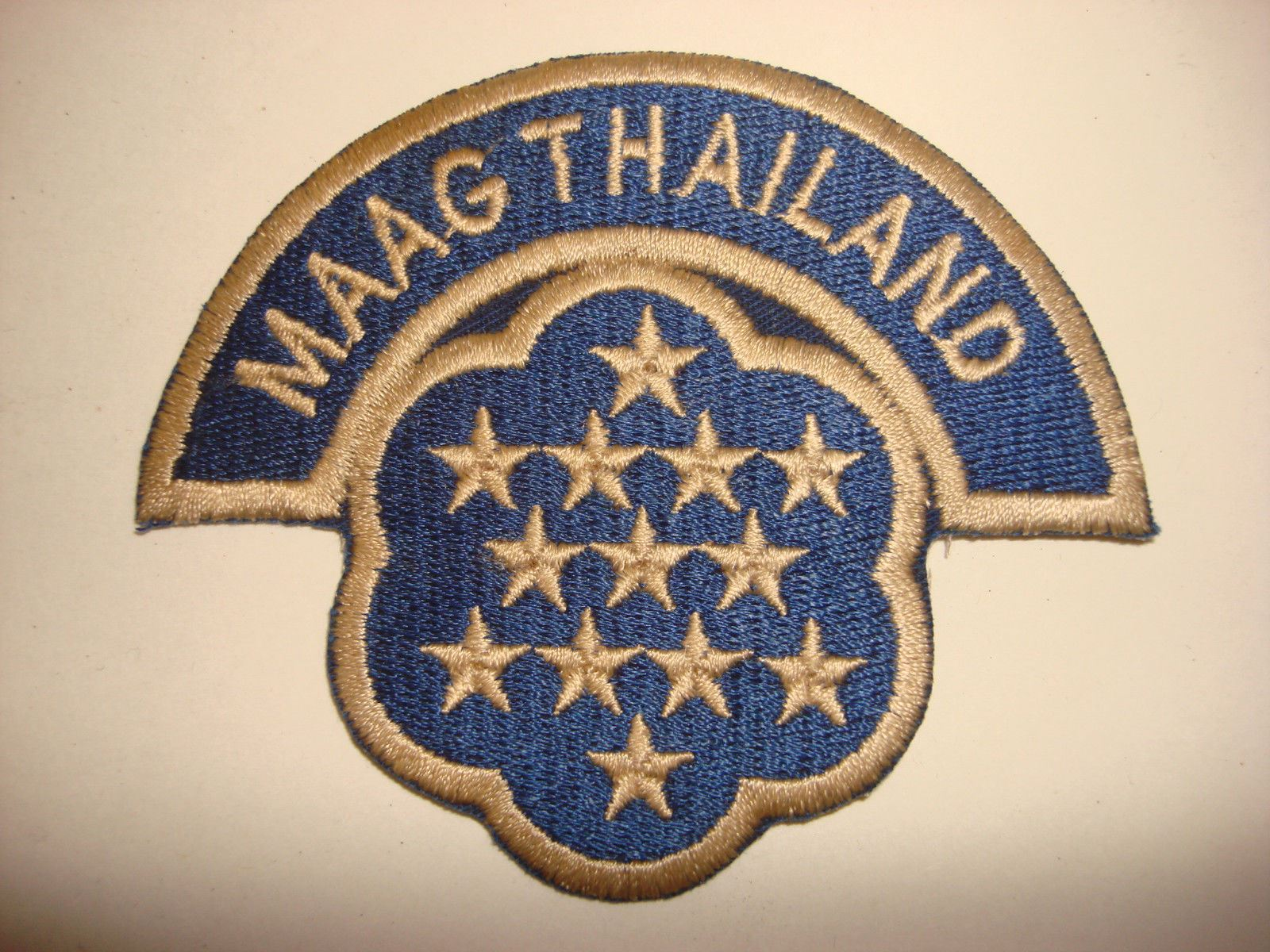
- Badge of MAAG/JUSMAGTHAI
- Country: United States
- Branch: United States Department of Defense
- Type: Security Assistance Organization
- Role: Military advisory, Foreign Military Sales, bilateral exercises, humanitarian demining
- Headquarters: Royal Thai Armed Forces compound, Sathorn Tai Road, Bangkok (near U.S. Embassy)
- Nickname(s): JUSMAGTHAI
- Patron: United States Pacific Command (USINDOPACOM)
- Engagements: Vietnam War (advisory support at peak ~45,000 U.S. personnel in Thailand)

The Joint United States Military Advisory Group, Thailand (JUSMAGTHAI) (formerly Military Assistance Advisory Group, Thailand), is the U.S. Department of Defense's Security Assistance Organization in Thailand. It was established on September 22, 1953. The chief of JUSMAGTHAI also serves as the senior defense official and defense attaché to Thailand.

At the height of the Vietnam War, many American military specialists were assigned to JUSMAG-THAI in Bangkok. As many as 45,000 US military personnel were stationed in Thailand. In the twenty-first century, JUSMAGTHAI supports a variety of missions, including a Joint Combined bilateral Exercise Program which averages over 60 exercises a year, Foreign Military Sales and humanitarian demining missions. JUSMAGTHAI is located on a Royal Thai Armed Forces military compound approximately two kilometers from the American Embassy, on Sathorn Tai Road.
