= Richard J. Seitz =

United States Army general

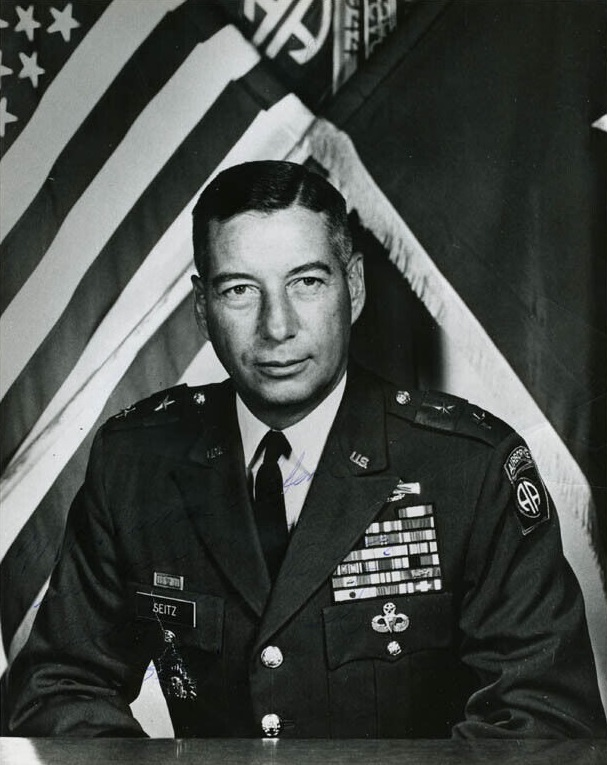
- Seitz, c. 1967
- Born: February 18, 1918; Leavenworth, Kansas
- Died: June 8, 2013 (aged 95); Junction City, Kansas
- Relatives: Brigadier General John A. Seitz (brother)
- Military career
- Allegiance: United States
- Branch: United States Army
- Service years: 1940–1975
- Rank: Lieutenant General
- Commands: XVIII Airborne Corps; 82nd Airborne Division; 2nd Battalion, 517th Parachute Infantry Regiment
- Conflicts: Vietnam; World War II
- Awards: Army Distinguished Service Medal (3); Silver Star; Legion of Merit (2); Bronze Star Medal (3); Air Medal; Purple Heart

Lieutenant General Richard Joe Seitz (February 18, 1918 – June 8, 2013) was a United States Army officer and paratrooper who, during a 35-year career, commanded the 2nd Battalion, 517th Parachute Infantry Regiment during World War II, the 82nd Airborne Division and the XVIII Airborne Corps.

== Family and education ==
Seitz and his brother, Brigadier General John A. "Andy" Seitz, both graduated from Leavenworth High School in Leavenworth, Kansas. Seitz graduated from high school in 1937 and was cadet commander of his school's ROTC unit. He also received the American Legion Cup as the outstanding cadet his senior year. In Leavenworth his father owned a wholesale milk and ice cream business and also served as the town's mayor. Attending Kansas State College, Seitz majored in agriculture and dairy husbandry. Having completed his senior-level ROTC work in two years, in 1939 he was commissioned as a second lieutenant in the infantry. While at Kansas State, Seitz was a member of the Alpha Omega Chapter of Pi Kappa Alpha. Years later, Seitz earned a bachelor's degree from the University of Omaha (now the University of Nebraska at Omaha).

Seitz's military education included the Infantry School, Air Corps Technical School Rigger Course, the Command and General Staff College, the Armed Forces Staff College, Army Language School (Portuguese), the Army War College, and the Sanz Language School—Persian.

Seitz's first and second wives preceded him in death. He met his first wife, the former Betty Merrill, while a student at Kansas State. They became reacquainted in France during World War II. Merrill was working as a Red Cross volunteer and Seitz had recently led his battalion during the Battle of the Bulge. They were married in Joigny, France on June 23, 1945. The General and his second wife, Virginia "Ginny" L. Seitz, were married on January 12, 1980. Seitz and his first wife are the parents of one son and three daughters: Major Rick Seitz, Judge Patricia Seitz, Dr. Catherine Seitz, and Dr. Victoria Seitz.

== Military career ==
While taking a year away from Kansas State to earn money for tuition, Seitz was called to duty in 1940 with the 38th Infantry Regiment in Texas. With the Army rapidly growing as the threat of war loomed, he quickly found himself in command of company, a position normally assigned to a captain. While attending an infantry course at Ft. Benning, he saw the original Parachute Test Platoon commanded by then-Major Bill Ryder and decided to become a paratrooper. After overcoming the objections of his battalion commander, Seitz took airborne training under the command of legendary Major General Bill Lee.

From 1950 to 1953, Seitz commanded the Airborne School at Ft. Benning, Georgia.

Seitz's first assignment after earning his jump wings was as a member of the 503d Parachute Infantry Battalion under the command of then-Major Robert Sink. His company commander was then-Captain Jim Gavin. Years later, Seitz credited Gavin with helping to instill in him the importance of a calm demeanor in communicating with soldiers. As a young captain, the commander of the 517th Parachute Infantry Regiment Colonel Louis A. Walsh, Jr. saw tremendous potential in Seitz and placed him in command of the 2nd Battalion in 1943. His selection for command made him one of the youngest infantry battalion commanders during World War II at three days shy of his 25th birthday. The 517th consisted of three battalions, the 1st Battalion, commanded by William J. Boyle, Seitz's 2nd Battalion and the 3rd Battalion commanded by Lieutenant Colonel Melvin Zais plus the 460th Parachute Field Artillery Battalion commanded by Lieutenant Colonel Raymond L. Cato.

During the Battle of the Bulge, the 28-year-old Seitz and his battalion of paratroopers would prove instrumental. Seitz headed "Task Force Seitz" built around his battalion and a company of 7th Armored Division tanks, equipped with some half-tracks, a detachment of engineers, and some self-propelled anti-tank guns. In twin attacks on two days, one after dark and the other in late evening, Seitz sent the Germans reeling back to the village of Hunnange, which was the gateway to St. Vith. In both attacks, paratroopers had to cross long stretches of open ground. With all guns blazing and with massive artillery support fire, they locked up the crossroads village then waited in broad daylight for the huge armored assault which came behind them, heading for the next stop, St. Vith.

The battered battalion, which lost more than 400 of the original 600 who entered Belgium only four weeks earlier, won acclaim for its grueling feat in the freezing evenings of a Belgian January. Seitz and his men were nominated for a Presidential Unit Citation, but in the confused business of the Bulge, the award was never made. Seitz received the Silver Star for his actions.

Seitz remained in the army following the World War II. From 1947 to 1949 he served in Japan with the 11th Airborne Division. From January, 1949, he served as the G-3 of the 11th Airborne Division at Ft. Campbell, Kentucky. In 1950, he graduated from the Command and General Staff College, at Ft. Leavenworth, Kansas. He was promoted to colonel in 1954 while serving in Brazil as part of the United States Military Assistance Group (Brazil). In the spring of 1957, he received orders to report to Carlisle Barracks, Pennsylvania, to attend the Army War College. In June, 1958, upon completion of the War College, he was assigned to the 82nd Airborne Division to command the 2nd Airborne Battle Group, 503d Infantry at Fort Bragg, North Carolina. In June 1959, he became the G-3 for the XVIII Airborne Corps.

For a year beginning in June 1960, he was Chief, Field Training Team U.S. Military Assistance Group, Iran. Following six-months at the University of Omaha, beginning in February 1962 he served for a year as Executive Officer, Office of the Deputy Chief of Staff for Personnel, Department of the Army.

Seitz was promoted to brigadier general in July 1963 and appointed Chief, Combined Armed Division and then Deputy Director of the Office of Personnel. He served in this role until July 1965 when he was named Assistant Deputy Commanding General, U.S. Army Vietnam (August 1965 – December 1965) and then served as Deputy Chief of Staff, United States Army, Vietnam (January 1966 – March 1966) and Chief of Staff, U.S. Army, Vietnam (April 1966 – April 1967).

In March 1967, Seitz was promoted to major general and a month later assumed command of the 82nd Airborne Division at Ft. Bragg. Seitz spent about a year and a half as commanding general but it was an eventful time in the history of the Airborne and the United States. In July 1967, a brigade from the Division was called to help quell rioting in Detroit. In February 1968, following the Tet Offensive, and with less than 36 hours notice, the Division deployed its 3rd Brigade to Vietnam. In late 1968, two brigades from the division were called out to put down rioting in Washington, D.C., after the assassination of Rev. Martin Luther King with General Seitz personally commanding the effort. One source credits Seitz for making the Division's distinctive maroon beret an accepted portion of its uniform although this is contradicted by other sources

In October 1968, Seitz became chairman, United States Delegation of Joint Brazil-US Military Commission. He held this position until July 1970 when he became Assistant Deputy Chief of Staff for Personnel. In May 1973, he was promoted to lieutenant general. His final assignment returned him to the Airborne as the commanding general of the XVIII Airborne Corps and Ft. Bragg. He retired from active duty in 1975.

== Awards and honors ==
The Association of the United States Army awarded Seitz the Creighton Abrams Award in 2003. The award was conferred to recognize "Seitz for his efforts to create a greater public awareness of the Army and to garner support for today's soldiers from citizens in all walks of life." In 2006 Pi Kappa Alpha awarded him its prestigious "Order of the West Range" award. During a celebration of the anniversary of Operation Dragon in September 2011, the French government conferred on him the National Order of the Legion of Honour, France's highest decoration. In 2012, a new elementary school, Seitz Elementary School, was named in the General's honor. The school's mascot is the Dragon in honor of the battalion Seitz commanded during World War II. In April 2017, a new Veteran's Affairs Community Based Outreach Clinic was named after General Seitz.

== Death ==
Seitz died on June 8, 2013, of congestive heart failure. He was 95.
