= Michael C. Flowers =

United States Army general

Michael C. Flowers, is a Brigadier General U.S. Army (ret) and former commander of the Joint POW/MIA Accounting Command (JPAC). Flowers is the chief operating officer of DigiFlight, Inc.

== Early life ==
Flowers was born at Ramey AFB in Aguadilla, Puerto Rico, into a U.S. Air Force family. He graduated from the University of Kansas in 1977 with a Bachelor of General Studies. In 1997, he earned a master's degree in public administration from Shippensburg University. He is also a graduate of the U.S. Army War College.

== Career ==
=== Army service ===
Flowers held a variety of command and staff positions throughout his 30+ years of service. He deployed to multiple military operations including the United States invasion of Grenada; Operations Desert Shield and Storm (Saudi Arabia and Iraq); and Operations Restore and Uphold Democracy (Haiti) and Joint Guardian (Kosovo). He is rated in the UH60 Blackhawk, UH1 Huey, AH1 Cobra, OH58A/C Kiowa and OH58D Kiowa Warrior.

Flowers' prior assignment was as chief of staff, NATO Kosovo Force (KFOR), Pristina, Kosovo, from July 2004 until June 2005. In July 1997, he assumed command of the 18th Aviation Brigade (Corps) (Airborne), XVIII Airborne Corps, Fort Bragg. He served as the XVIII Airborne Corps aviation officer. In July 1999, he relinquished command and served as chief, Joint Exercises and Training, then later, chief, Operations plans division, J-3, U.S. European Command, Stuttgart. Flowers then served as director, Center of Army Leadership, U.S. Army Command and General Staff College, Fort Leavenworth, Kansas, from August 2001 until June 2003. From that assignment, he became the director, human resources policy directorate, office of the deputy chief of staff, G-1, U.S. Army, Washington D.C.

He was a member of the Multi-National Force and Observers in Sinai, Egypt, and chief of staff of NATO's Kosovo Force in Pristina, Kosovo.

On September 1, 2006, members of the Lao and U.S. delegations, led by Flowers and including Ambassador Patricia Haslach and Southam Sakonhninhom, conducted consultative talks in Vientiane. These talks, first held in 1989, provided the basis of JPAC search and recovery operations in the Lao PDR.

In March 2006, U.S. and Vietnamese officials met in Hanoi, for the second round of technical talks of the year. The talks were led by Flowers, commander of the Joint POW/MIA Accounting Command. The U.S. Ambassador to Vietnam, Michael Marine, participated in the talks along with DoD officials. Vietnamese officials included the newly appointed director of the Vietnam Office for Seeking Missing Persons, Nguyen Ba Hung, along with officials from the Ministry of Foreign Affairs and Ministry of National Defense.

Flowers routinely hosted technical and consultative talks with senior officials worldwide to address topics specific to JPAC operations. JPAC negotiations ensure positive in-country conditions are maintained or established for investigative and recovery operations.

=== Post-army career ===
Flowers retired from the U.S. Army in 2008 and joined DigiFlight, Inc. He is the chief operating officer, overseeing Quality, Safety and Business Development and Camelot Secure business units.

He is married to Lesia Tyo.

== Recognition ==
Flowers' decorations:

- Defense Superior Service Medal (three awards)
- Legion of Merit (three awards)
- Bronze Star Medal
- Defense Meritorious Service Medal
- Meritorious Service Medal (four awards)
- Air Medal
- Senior Army Aviator Badge
- Master Parachutist Badge, French, German & British Parachutist Badge
- He was Ranger qualified.
