= John A. Seitz =

United States Army general (1908–1987)

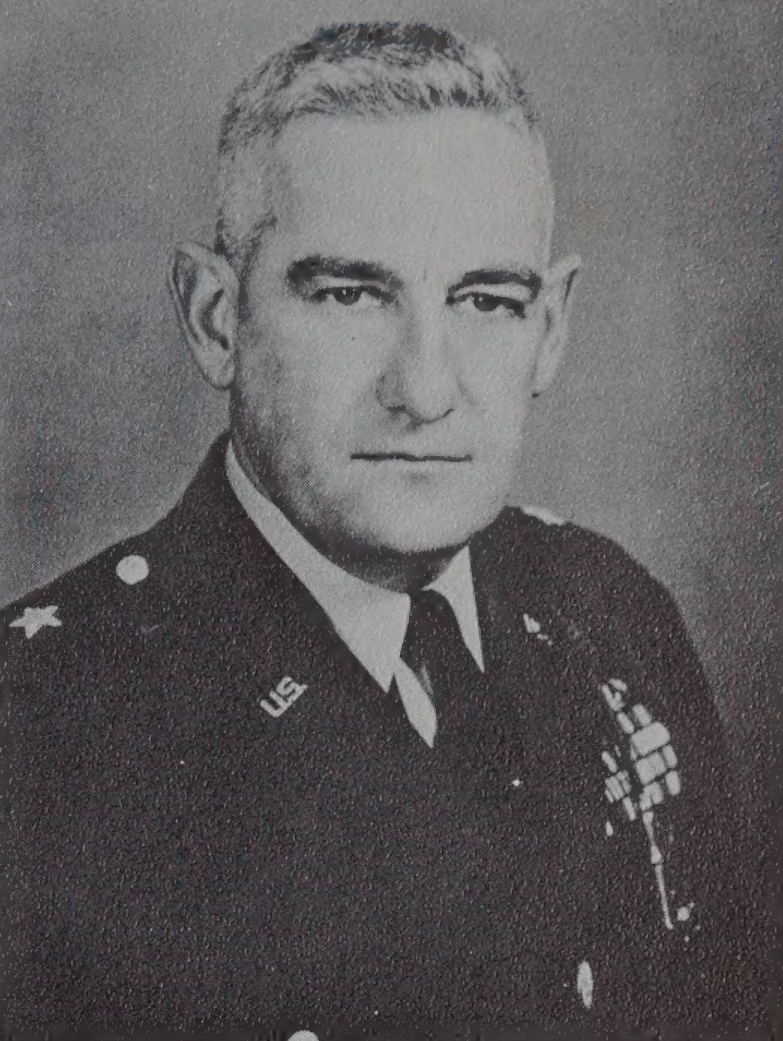
- Seitz as 1st Infantry Division Artillery commander c. 1959
- Born: 30 December 1908
- Died: 4 January 1987 (aged 78); Junction City, Kansas
- Relatives: Richard J. Seitz (brother)
- Military career
- Allegiance: United States
- Branch: United States Army
- Service years: 1930–1967
- Rank: Brigadier General
- Commands: 1st Infantry Division; XVIII Airborne Corps
- Awards: Distinguished Service Medal; Legion of Merit with Oak Leaf Cluster; Master Parachutist Badge

John Andrew Seitz (December 30, 1908 – January 4, 1987) was the American commanding general of the 1st Infantry Division and the XVIII Airborne Corps.

== Family and education ==
General Seitz was born in Leavenworth, Kansas, and graduated from Leavenworth High School. His brother was Lieutenant General Richard J. Seitz.

Seitz was a 1932 graduate of the University of Kansas. In 1987, he was a recipient of the school's Mildred Clodfelter Alumni Award.

He had two wives. His second wife was Dorothy "Dottie" Seaborn Seitz (1918–2010). Seitz had a son, Colonel John Andrew Seitz III.

== Military career ==
An artillery officer, during World War II, Seitz served in the Pacific Theater of Operations (P.T.O.) and with the War Department in Washington, D.C..

From January to February 1960 he was the commanding general of the 1st Infantry Division and Ft. Riley.

From 1961 to 1963 he was the chief of staff of the Fifth Army.

Following his retirement in 1967, General Seitz served as a vice president with the First National Bank and Trust Company in Junction City, Kansas.

His military decorations included the Distinguished Service Medal, Legion of Merit with Oak Leaf Cluster, Army Commendation Medal, Korean Order of Merit with Star, along with the Master Parachutist Badge.

The road leading to the officer's club at Ft. Riley, Kansas, is named for General Seitz.

He died on Sunday January 4, 1987, at his home after being in poor health for more than a year. He was 78 years of age.
