= General Johnson =

General Johnson may refer to:

- General Johnson (musician) (1941–2010), American musician

General Johnson may also refer to generals with the surname of Johnson:

== United Kingdom ==
- Allen Johnson (Indian Army officer) (1829–1907), British Indian Army general
- Charles Bulkeley Bulkeley-Johnson (1867–1917), British Army brigadier general
- Charles Cooper Johnson (1827–1905), British Army general
- Dudley Graham Johnson (1884–1975), British Army major general
- Edwin Beaumont Johnson (1825–1893), British Army general
- Garry Johnson (born 1937), British Army general
- George Johnson (British Army officer) (1903–1980), British Army major general
- Sir Henry Johnson, 1st Baronet (1748–1835), British Army general
- Sir John Johnson, 2nd Baronet (1741–1830), British Loyalist in the American Revolution and King's Royal Regiment of New York brigadier general
- Sir William Johnson, 1st Baronet (c. 1715–1774), British Army major general

== United States ==
- Andrew Johnson (1808–1875), Union Army brigadier general
- Arthur Johnson (Army general) (1862–1946), U.S. Army brigadier general
- Bradley Tyler Johnson (1829–1903), Confederate States Army brigadier general
- Bushrod Johnson (1817–1880), Confederate States Army major general
- Byron F. Johnson (1894–1980), U.S. Marine Corps major general
- Dean Johnson (politician) (born 1947), U.S. Army National Guard brigadier general
- Edward Johnson (general) (1816–1873), Confederate States Army major general
- Evan M. Johnson (1861–1923), U.S. Army brigadier general
- George Johnson (general) (1918–2021), U.S. Air Force major general
- Gerald W. Johnson (military officer) (1919–2002), U.S. Air Force lieutenant general
- Hansford T. Johnson (born 1936), U.S. Air Force general
- Harold Keith Johnson (1912–1983), U.S. Army general
- Herbert Thomas Johnson (1872–1942), Vermont National Guard brigadier general
- Harry H. Johnson (1895–1987), U.S. Army major general
- Hugh S. Johnson (1881–1942), U.S. Army brigadier general
- James Allen Johnson, U.S. Army major general
- James H. Johnson (major general) (1929–2008), U.S. Army major general
- James H. Johnson Jr. (1937–2023), U.S. Army lieutenant general
- John D. Johnson (general), U.S. Army lieutenant general
- John P. Johnson (general) (fl. 1980s–2010s), U.S. Army major general
- Kermit D. Johnson (1928–2020), U.S. Army major general
- Leon W. Johnson (1904–1997), U.S. Air Force general
- Michelle D. Johnson (born c. 1959), U.S. Air Force lieutenant general
- Paul Johnson (United States Air Force) (born 1958), U.S. Air Force major general
- Richard W. Johnson (1827–1897), Union Army brigadier general
- Rodney L. Johnson (1955–2023), U.S. Army brigadier general
- Stephen T. Johnson (born 1950), U.S. Marine Corps major general
- Stovepipe Johnson (1834–1922), Confederate States Army brigadier general
- Thomas Johnson (jurist) (1732–1819), Maryland Militia brigadier general

== Others ==
- Frank W. Johnson (1799–1884), Army of the Republic of Texas general
- Mobolaji Johnson (1936–2019), Nigerian Army brigadier general

== See also ==
- Hazel Johnson-Brown (1927–2011), U.S. Army brigadier general
- Attorney General Johnson (disambiguation)
- Johnson (disambiguation)
