= James H. Johnson =

James H. Johnson may refer to:

- James H. Johnson (figure skater) (1874–1921), British silver medalist in pairs figure skating at the 1908 Summer Olympics
- James H. Johnson (major general) (1929–2008), major general in the U.S. Army
- James H. Johnson Jr. (born 1937), lieutenant general in the U.S. Army
- James Hervey Johnson (1901–1988), American atheist
- James Hutchins Johnson (1802–1887), U.S. congressman from New Hampshire
