= George M. Johnson =

George M. Johnson may refer to:

- George Macness Johnson (1853-1935), Newfoundland lawyer, judge, and politician
- George Marion Johnson (1900–1987) American lawyer, academic
- George Metcalf Johnson (1885-1965), American writer of mystery and western novels
- George Johnson (general) (1918-2021), American Air Force Major General
- George M. Johnson (writer) (born 1985), American writer of All Boys Aren't Blue
