= Curtis Scaparrotti =

US Army general

Mike Scaparrotti
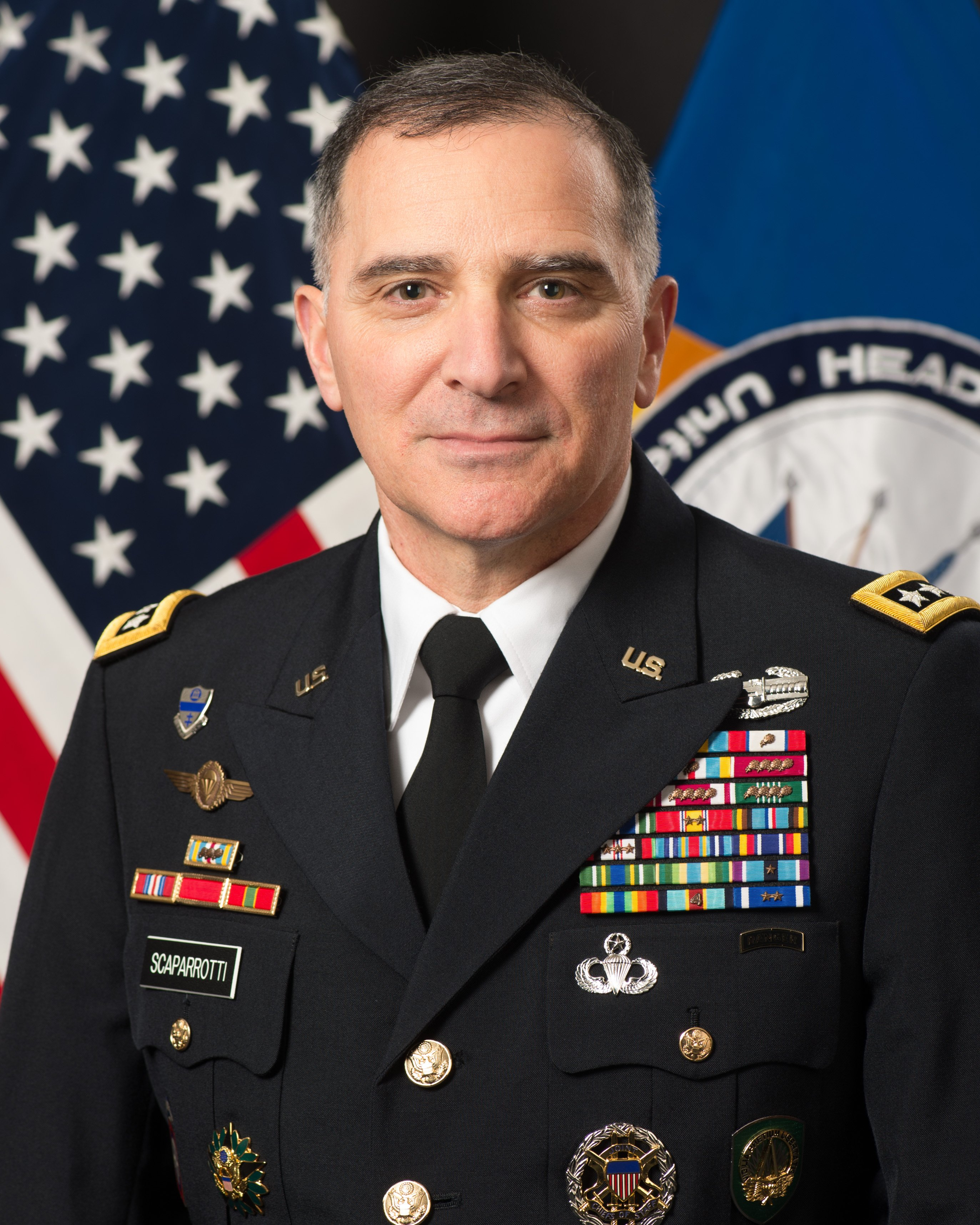
- Official portrait, 2016
- Born: 5 March 1956 (age 70); Logan, Ohio, U.S.
- Education: United States Military Academy (BS); University of South Carolina (MEd)
- Military career
- Allegiance: United States
- Branch: United States Army
- Service years: 1978–2019
- Rank: General
- Nickname: "Scap"
- Commands: Supreme Allied Commander Europe; United States European Command; United Nations Command; ROK/U.S. Combined Forces Command; United States Forces Korea; I Corps; International Security Assistance Force Joint Command; 82nd Airborne Division
- Conflicts: Operation Joint Endeavor; Operation Support Hope; Iraq War; War in Afghanistan
- Awards: Defense Distinguished Service Medal (3); Army Distinguished Service Medal (2); Defense Superior Service Medal (2); Legion of Merit (5); Bronze Star (3)
- Curtis Scaparrotti's voice Scaparrotti's opening statement at a House Armed Services Committee hearing on the Asia-Pacific region Recorded 24 February 2016

Curtis Michael "Mike" Scaparrotti (born 5 March 1956) is a retired United States Army four-star general who last served as the commander of United States European Command. He concurrently served as NATO's Supreme Allied Commander Europe. Scaparrotti previously served as the director of the Joint Staff. Prior to his tour with the Joint Staff, Scaparrotti served as commander, International Security Assistance Force Joint Command and deputy commander, U.S. Forces – Afghanistan, the commanding general of I Corps and Joint Base Lewis-McChord, and the commanding general of the 82nd Airborne Division.

In addition, Scaparrotti served in key leadership positions at the tactical, operational, and strategic level of the United States military, including as director of operations, United States Central Command and as the 69th commandant of cadets at the United States Military Academy. He commanded forces during Operations Iraqi Freedom, Enduring Freedom (Afghanistan), Support Hope (Zaire/Rwanda), Joint Endeavour (Bosnia-Herzegovina), and Assured Response (Liberia).

In 1978 Scaparrotti graduated from the United States Military Academy at West Point, New York. His military education includes the Infantry Officer Basic and Advanced Courses, Command and General Staff College, and the United States Army War College. He holds a master's degree in Administrative Education from the University of South Carolina.

== Career ==
Scaparrotti's initial duty assignments were as a rifle and anti-tank platoon leader, operations officer and company commander in 3rd Battalion, 325th Infantry, 82nd Airborne Division at Fort Bragg, North Carolina. In 1984, Scaparrotti completed the infantry officer advanced course at Fort Benning, Georgia, followed by studies in Administrative Education at the University of South Carolina, where he earned his Master of Education degree.

Scaparrotti returned to West Point in 1985 where he was assigned as a tactical officer and the superintendent's aide-de-camp until 1988. After his assignment there, he continued his military studies at the U.S. Army Command and General Staff College at Fort Leavenworth, Kansas.

By July 1989, Scaparrotti went on to serve with the 10th Mountain Division in Fort Drum, New York, where he was the operations officer for 1st Battalion, 87th Infantry Regiment and then moved to division headquarters as the chief of the operations branch.

From 1992 to 1994, Scaparrotti was stationed in Washington, D.C., at the Army Total Personnel Command and the Army Chief of Staff's office.

In May 1994, Scaparrotti took command of 3rd Battalion, 325th Airborne Combat Team, Southern European Task Force in Vicenza, Italy, and in that time he commanded the battalion during Operations Support Hope in Zaire/Rwanda, Joint Endeavor in Bosnia-Herzegovina and Assured Response (1996) in Liberia.

Scaparrotti returned to Fort Drum in 1996 as the 10th Mountain Division's operations officer and from there he continued his studies at the U.S. Army War College, Carlisle Barracks. He served as the chief of Army Initiatives Group in the Deputy Chief of Staff's Office for Plans and Operations in Washington, D. C. in 1998.

By 1999, Scaparrotti returned to Fort Bragg to command the 2nd Brigade, 82nd Airborne Division before he moved on to serve as the assistant deputy director for Joint Operations on the Joint Staff, Washington, D. C., from 2001 to 2003.

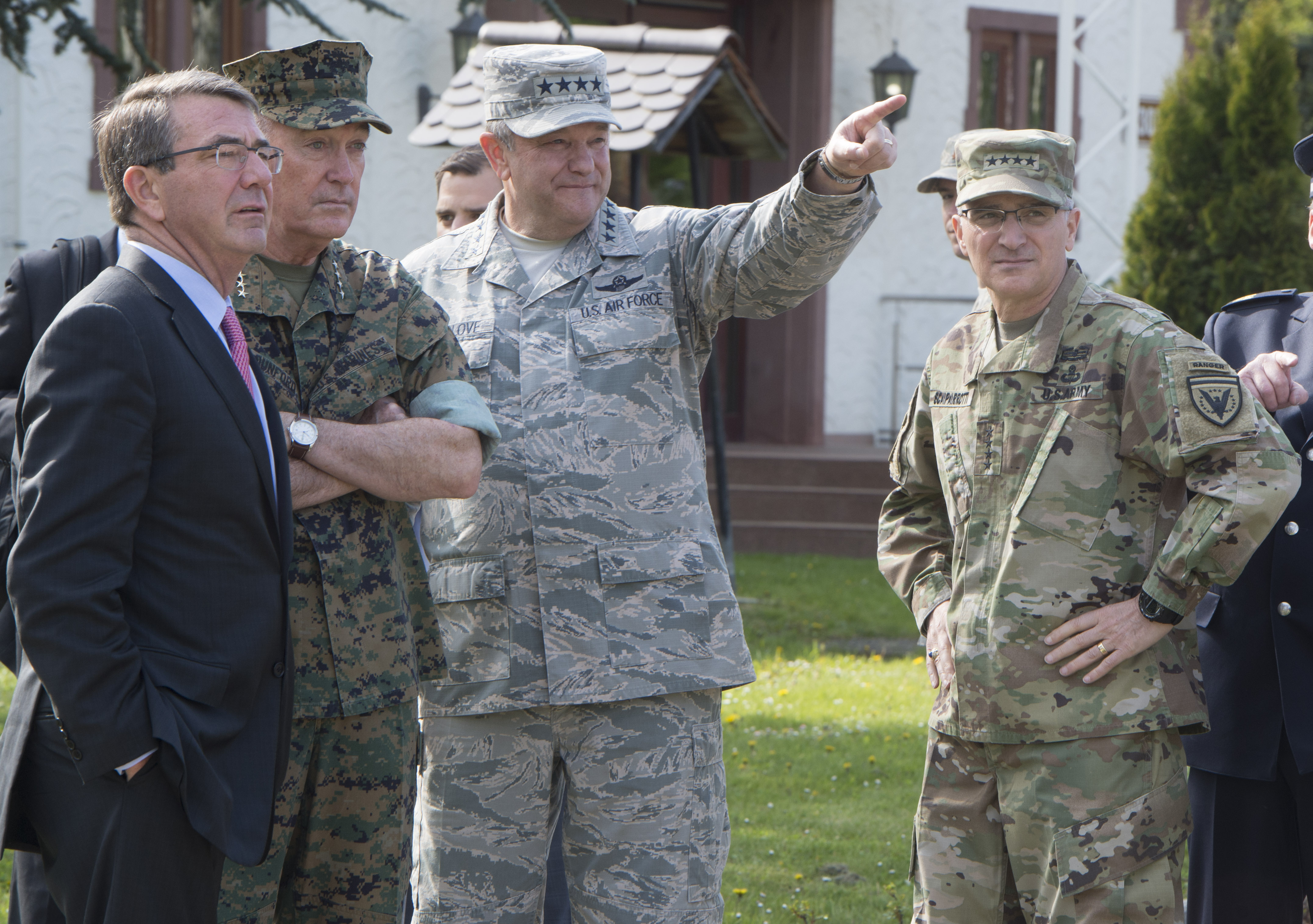
Scaparrotti with Secretary of Defense Ash Carter, Philip M. Breedlove and Joseph Dunford, 3 May 2016

From July 2003 to July 2004, Scaparrotti served as the assistant division commander (Maneuver) for the 1st Armored Division during the Iraq War. From August 2004 to July 2006, Scaparrotti served as the 69th commandant of cadets, United States Military Academy, at West Point, New York. Thereafter, he was assigned as the director of operations (J3) for United States Central Command (CENTCOM), providing oversight to all military operations throughout the CENTCOM Area of Responsibility, including Iraq and Afghanistan, and also including operations in Somalia, at a critical phase in those missions.

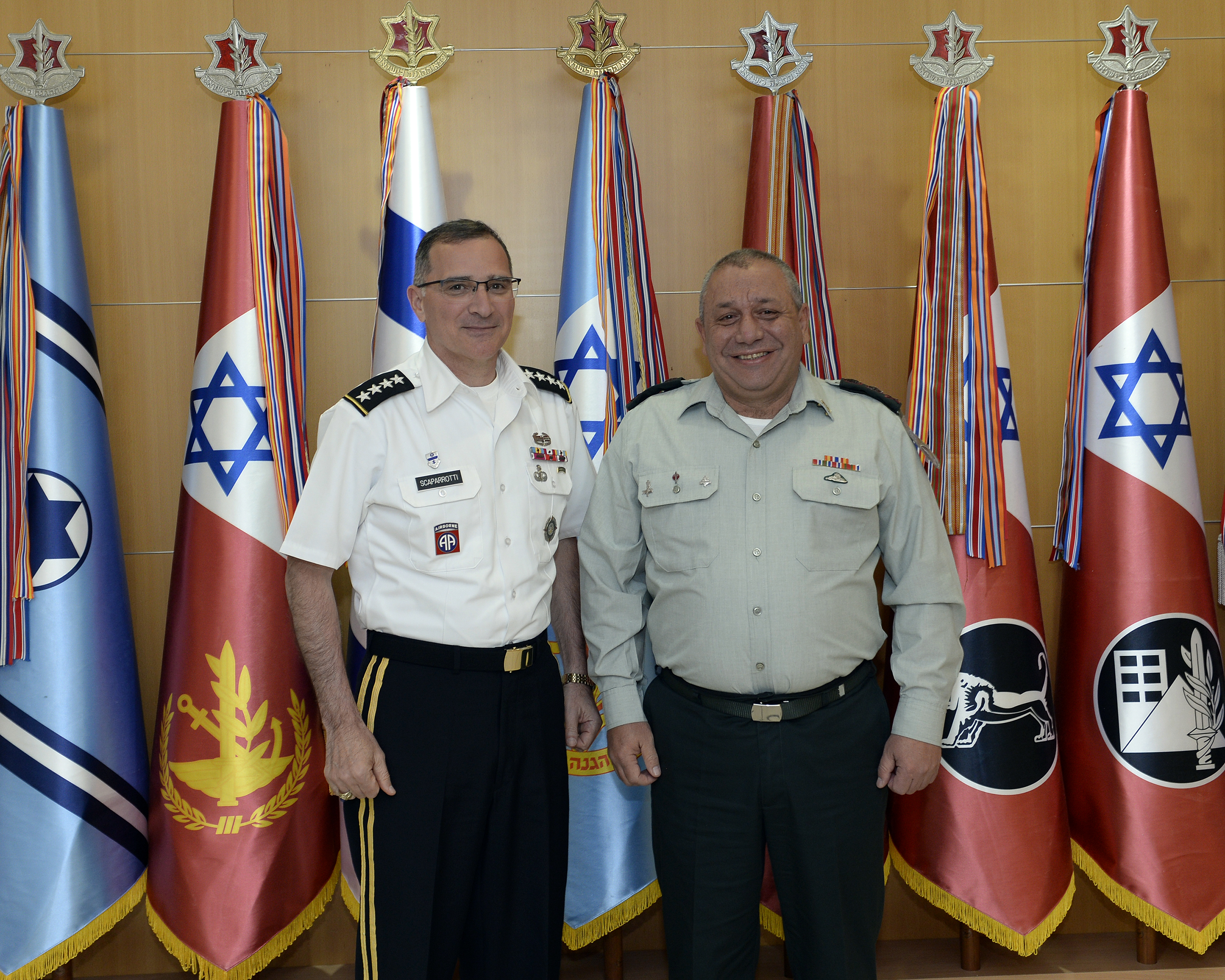
Scaparrotti and Israel's military chief Gadi Eizenkot, 16 August 2016

Scaparrotti assumed command of the 82nd Airborne Division on 1 October 2008, and deployed the headquarters to Eastern Afghanistan where he served as the commanding general of Combined Joint Task Force 82 and Regional Command East.

On 15 October 2010, Scaparrotti assumed command of I Corps and Joint Base Lewis McChord (JBLM) at Fort Lewis, Washington. While serving as I Corps commander, Scaparrotti served concurrently as commander, International Security Assistance Force Joint Command and deputy commander, U.S. Forces – Afghanistan from 11 July 2011 to 12 June 2012. In July 2012, Scaparrotti took over as director of the Joint Staff. He was succeeded as I Corps commander by Lieutenant General Robert B. Brown on 3 July 2012.

In August 2013, Scaparrotti took over command of U.S. forces in South Korea, replacing General James D. Thurman. In April 2016, he was succeeded as USFK commander by General Vincent K. Brooks.

In May 2016 he assumed duties as commander of European Command and as Supreme Allied Commander, Europe. In April 2018, Scaparotti met General Valery Gerasimov, Chief of the General Staff of the Armed Forces of the Russian Federation, under the auspices of the NATO-Russia Council, in Baku. This act represented the first attempt to build up a dialogue with Moscow after the annexation of Crimea by the Russian Federation and Putin's declaration to empower Russian military capabilities. In May 2019 he was succeeded by General Tod D. Wolters.

Scaparrotti also sits on the Atlantic Council's board of directors.

== Awards and decorations ==
Scaparrotti's awards and decorations include:

Combat Action Badge
Expert Infantryman Badge
Ranger tab
Master Parachutist Badge
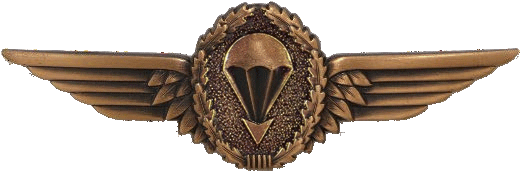
German Parachutist Badge in bronze
Joint Staff Identification Badge
Army Staff Identification Badge
United States European Command Badge
82nd Airborne Division CSIB
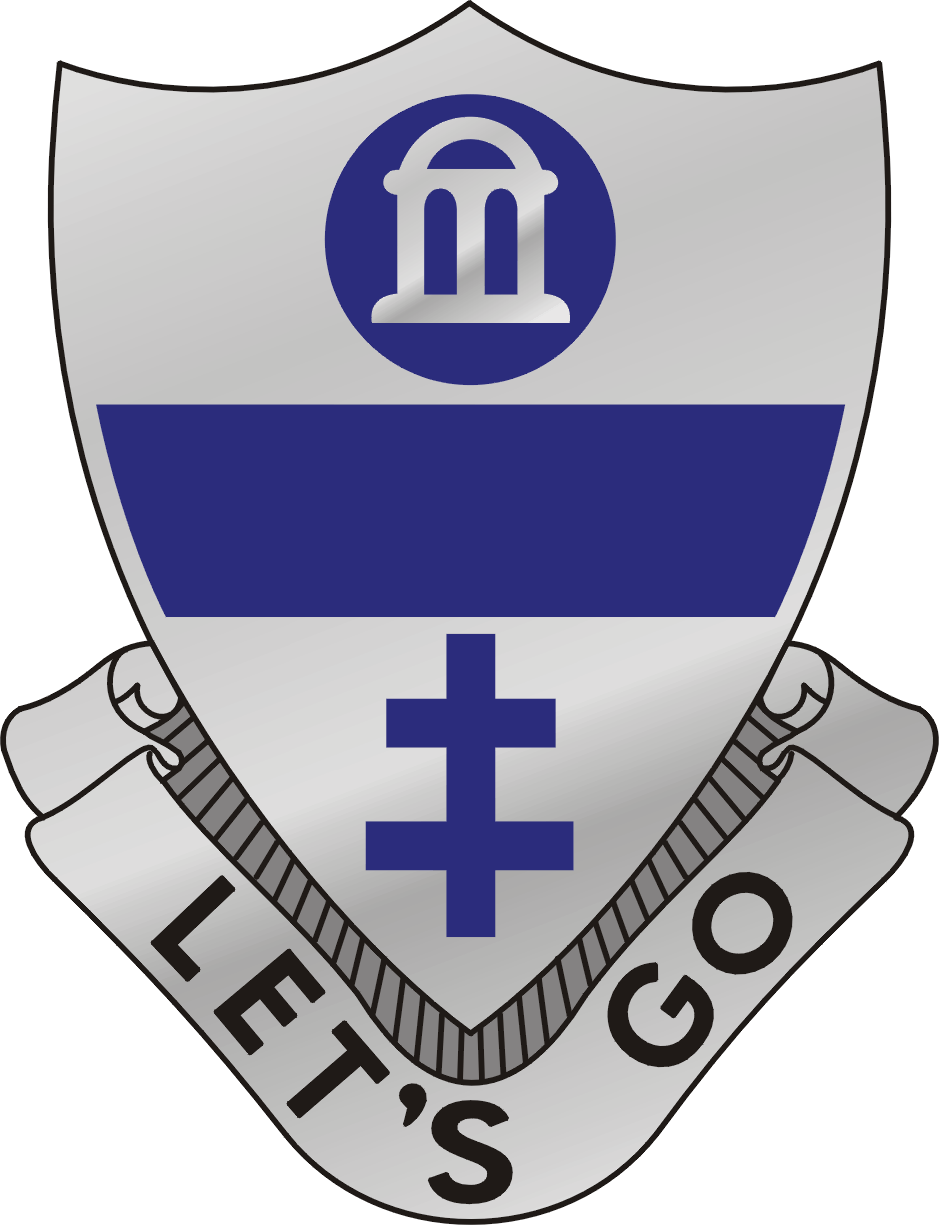
325th Infantry Regiment DUI
6 Overseas Service Bars

Defense Distinguished Service Medal with two bronze oak leaf clusters
Army Distinguished Service Medal with one bronze oak leaf cluster
Defense Superior Service Medal with oak leaf cluster
Legion of Merit with four oak leaf clusters
Bronze Star with two oak leaf clusters
Meritorious Service Medal with four oak leaf clusters
Army Commendation Medal with four oak leaf clusters
Army Achievement Medal
Joint Meritorious Unit Award with three oak leaf clusters
Valorous Unit Award
Meritorious Unit Commendation
Superior Unit Award
National Defense Service Medal with two bronze service stars
Armed Forces Expeditionary Medal
Afghanistan Campaign Medal with three bronze campaign stars
Global War on Terrorism Expeditionary Medal
Global War on Terrorism Service Medal
Korea Defense Service Medal
Armed Forces Service Medal
Humanitarian Service Medal with one service star
Army Service Ribbon
Army Overseas Service Ribbon with bronze award numeral 4
NATO Meritorious Service Medal
NATO Medal for the former Yugoslavia with two bronze service stars
Order of National Security Merit, Tong-il Medal (Republic of Korea)
Commander's Cross with Star of the Order of Merit of the Republic of Poland
Order of Merit of the Italian Republic, Grand Officer
Order of Duke Trpimir (Croatia)

- In May 2018, Scaparrotti was awarded the Distinguished Military Leadership Award of the Atlantic Council.
- In October 2019, he received the America Award of the Italy-USA Foundation.

Military offices
Preceded by Leo Brooks	Commandant of Cadets of the United States Military Academy; 2004–2006	Succeeded by Robert L. Caslen
Preceded by David M. Rodriguez	Commanding General of the 82nd Airborne Division; 2008–2010	Succeeded by James Huggins
Preceded by John Johnson	Commanding General of I Corps; 2010–2012	Succeeded by Robert Brown
Preceded by David M. Rodriguez	Commander of the International Security Assistance Force Joint Command; 2011–2012	Succeeded by James L. Terry
Preceded by David M. Rodriguez	Deputy Commander of United States Forces-Afghanistan; 2011–2012	Succeeded by James L. Terry
Preceded by William E. Gortney	Director of the Joint Staff; 2012-2013	Succeeded by David L. Goldfein
Preceded by James D. Thurman	Commander of United Nations Command, Commander of United States Forces Korea and Commander of ROK/US Combined Forces Command; 2013–2016	Succeeded by Vincent K. Brooks
Preceded by Philip M. Breedlove	Commander of the United States European Command and Supreme Allied Commander Europe; 2016–2019	Succeeded by Tod D. Wolters
