= List of commanders of 82nd Airborne Division =

Shoulder sleeve insignia of the 82nd Airborne Division.

This is a list of commanders of the 82nd Airborne Division of the United States Army. The 82nd Airborne Division is one of the oldest divisions in the U.S. Army, having been raised shortly after the American entry into World War I in April 1917 and seeing service in World War I and World War II and many subsequent conflicts.

- Major General Eben Swift 25 August – 23 November 1917
- Brigadier General William P. Burnham, 27 December 1917 – 3 October 1918
- Major General George B. Duncan, 4 October 1918 – 21 May 1919
- Brigadier General Walter H. Gordon, 25 October 1921 - 13 July 1922
- Brigadier General Abraham G. Lott, 1 March 1928 - 3 September 1929
- Brigadier General George H. Estes, 19 September 1929 - 25 August 1933
- Colonel Thomas S. Moorman, 25 August 1933 - 12 January 1934
- Brigadier General Robert O. Van Horn, 12 January 1934 - 31 August 1939
- Colonel William P. Ennis, 1 September 1939 - 31 August 1941
- Major General Omar N. Bradley, 23 March – 25 June 1942
- Major General Matthew B. Ridgway, 26 June 1942 – 27 August 1944
- Major General James M. Gavin, 28 August 1944 – 26 March 1948
- Major General Clovis E. Byers, 27 March 1948 – 18 July 1949
- Brigadier General Ridgely Gaither, 19 July – 31 October 1949
- Major General Williston B. Palmer, 1 November 1949 – 15 October 1950
- Major General Thomas F. Hickey, 16 October 1950 – 31 January 1952
- Major General Charles D. W. Canham, 1 February 1952 – 29 September 1952
- Major General Gerald J. Higgins, 20 September 1952 – 14 September 1953
- Major General Francis W. Farrell, 6 October 1953 – 4 July 1955
- Major General Thomas Trapnell 5 July – 13 September 1956
- Major General John W. Bowen 14 September 1956 – 27 December 1957
- Major General Hamilton H. Howze, 2 January 1958 – 13 June 1959
- Major General Dwight E. Beach, 1 July 1959 – 21 April 1961
- Major General Theodore J. Conway, 22 April 1961 – 6 July 1962
- Major General John L. Throckmorton, 7 July 1962 – 1 February 1964
- Major General Robert H. York, 24 February 1964 – 15 July 1965
- Major General Joe S. Lawrie, 2 August 1965 – 14 April 1967
- Major General Richard J. Seitz, 15 April 1967 – 12 October 1968
- Major General John R. Deane Jr., 14 October 1968 – 14 July 1970
- Major General George S. Blanchard, 15 July 1970 – 16 July 1972
- Major General Frederick J. Kroesen, 17 July 1972 – 7 October 1974
- Major General Thomas Tackaberry, 8 October 1974 – 11 October 1976
- Major General Roscoe Robinson Jr., 11 October 1976 – 1 December 1978
- Major General Guy S. Meloy III, 1 December 1978 – 6 February 1981
- Major General James J. Lindsay, 6 February 1981 – 24 June 1983
- Major General Edward Trobaugh, 24 June 1983 – 19 June 1985
- Major General Bobby B. Porter, 19 June 1985 – 10 January 1986
- Major General John W. Foss, 10 January 1986 – 10 October 1986
- Brigadier General Raphael J. Hallada, 10 October 1986 – 5 January 1987
- Major General Carl W. Stiner, 5 January 1987 – 11 October 1988
- Major General James H. Johnson, 11 October 1988 – 29 May 1991
- Major General Henry H. Shelton, 29 May 1991 – 21 May 1993
- Major General William M. Steele, 21 May 1993 – 10 March 1995
- Major General George A. Crocker, 10 March 1995 – 27 November 1996
- Major General Joseph K. Kellogg Jr., 27 November 1996 – 31 July 1998
- Major General Dan K. McNeill, 31 July 1998 – 19 June 2000
- Major General John Vines, August 2000 – October 2002
- Major General Charles Swannack, October 2002 – 27 May 2004
- Major General William B. Caldwell IV, 27 May 2004 – 7 April 2006
- Major General David M. Rodriguez, 7 April 2006 – 21 July 2008
- Major General Curtis Scaparrotti, 21 July 2008 – 5 August 2010
- Major General James L. Huggins, 5 August 2010 – 5 October 2012
- Major General John W. Nicholson Jr., 5 October 2012 – 7 October 2014
- Major General Richard D. Clarke Jr., 7 October 2014 – 2 August 2016
- Major General Michael E. Kurilla, 2 August 2016 – 2 August 2018
- Major General James J. Mingus, 2 August 2018 – 10 July 2020
- Major General Christopher T. Donahue, 10 July 2020 – 10 March 2022
- Major General Christopher C. LaNeve, 10 March 2022 – 17 November 2023
- Major General J. Patrick Work, 17 November 2023 - 28 August 2025
- Major General Brandon R. Tegtmeier, 28 August 2025-present
