= J. Patrick Work =

US Army general officer

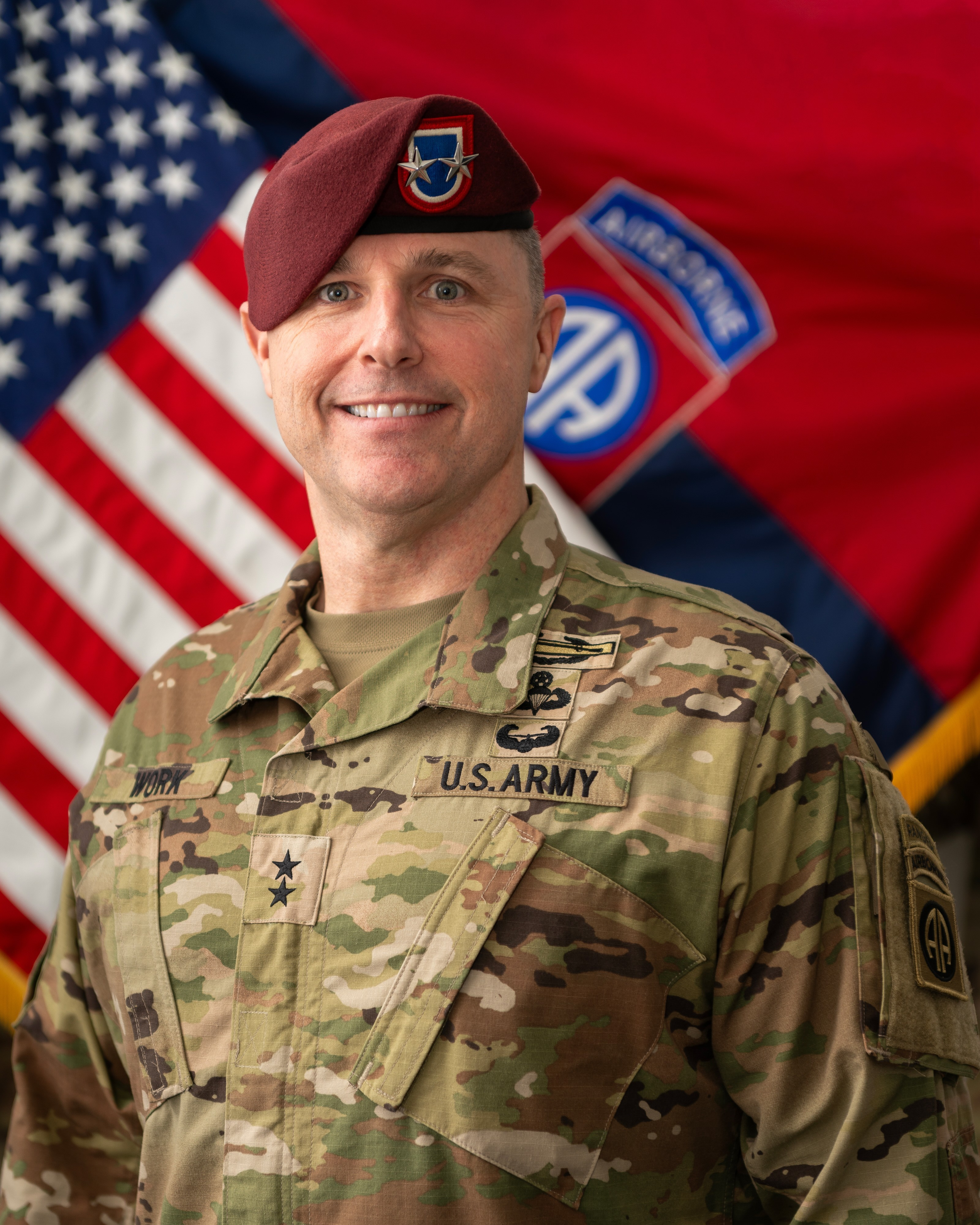
- Official portrait, 2024
- Born: c. 1973 (age 52–53)
- Military career
- Allegiance: United States
- Branch: United States Army
- Service years: 1995–Present
- Rank: Major General
- Commands: 82nd Airborne Division; 3rd Battalion, 187th Infantry Regiment; 2nd Brigade Combat Team, 82nd Airborne Division; Company C, 2d Battalion, 75th Ranger Regiment, Company B, 1st Battalion, 23rd Infantry Regiment

James Patrick Work (born c. 1973) is a United States Army major general who serves as the Deputy Commanding General of the 18th Airborne Corps. He previously served as the Commanding General of the 82nd Airborne Division.

Work was commissioned from the United States Military Academy in 1995, where he was a member of the Black Knights Football team. He also graduated from the Marine Corps War College in 2016 and earned a Master of Public Policy Degree from Georgetown University in 2010.

In January 2021, Work was promoted to brigadier general. In December 2023 he was promoted to major general.

Military offices
Preceded by David S. Doyle	Deputy Commanding General (Support) of the 82nd Airborne Division; 2020–2021	Succeeded by Shane P. Morgan
Preceded by Christopher LaNeve	Director of Operations, Readiness, and Mobilization of the United States Army; 2021–2023	Succeeded by John W. Lubas
Preceded by Christopher LaNeve	Commanding General of the 82nd Airborne Division; 2022–2023	Succeeded by Maj. Gen. Brandon Tegtmeier
