= Philip M. Breedlove =

US Air Force general (born 1955)

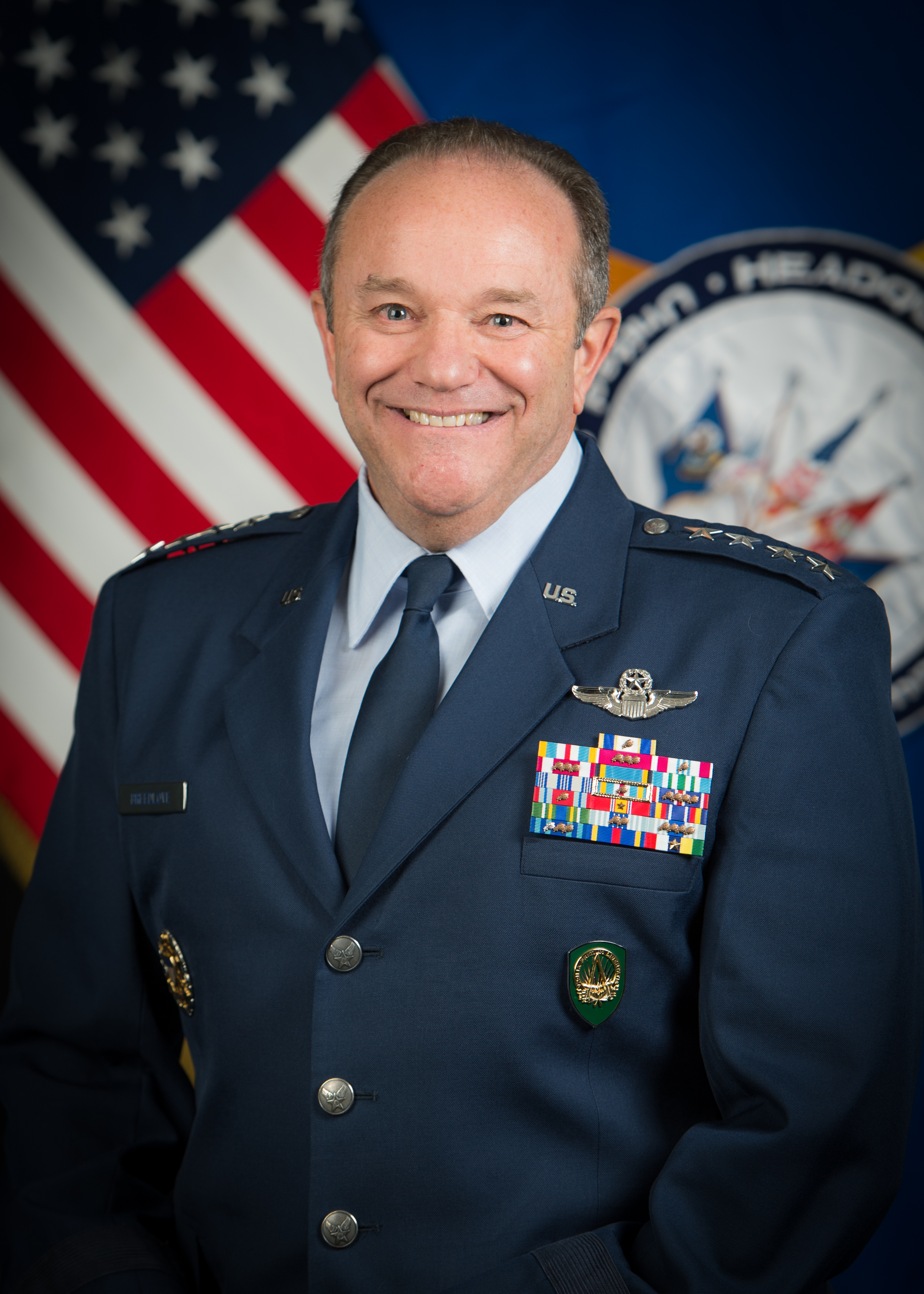
- 2013 official portrait as Commander, USEUCOM

17th Supreme Allied Commander Europe (NATO)
- In office May 13, 2013 – May 4, 2016
- President: Barack Obama
- Deputy: Richard Shirreff; Adrian Bradshaw
- Preceded by: James G. Stavridis
- Succeeded by: Curtis Scaparrotti

35th Commander-in-Chief of The United States Air Forces in Europe
- In office July 27, 2012 – May 13, 2013
- Preceded by: Mark Welsh
- Succeeded by: Frank Gorenc

36th Vice Chief of Staff of the United States Air Force
- In office January 14, 2011 – July 27, 2012
- Preceded by: Carrol H. Chandler
- Succeeded by: Larry O. Spencer

Personal details
- Born: Philip Mark Breedlove; September 21, 1955 (age 71) Atlanta, Georgia, U.S.
- Awards: Defense Distinguished Service Medal; Air Force Distinguished Service Medal (2); Defense Superior Service Medal Legion of Merit (4); Defense Meritorious Service Medal (2); Meritorious Service Medal (4)

Military service
- Allegiance: United States of America
- Branch/service: United States Air Force
- Years of service: 1977–2016
- Rank: General
- Commands: U.S. European Command; Supreme Allied Commander Europe; U.S. Air Forces Africa; U.S. Air Forces in Europe; Joint Air Power Competence Center; Air Component Command, Ramstein; 8th Fighter Wing; 31st Fighter Wing; 56th Tactical Training Wing; 3rd Air Force; 27th Operations Group; 80th Fighter Squadron
- Battles/wars: Cold War; Gulf War; War in Afghanistan

Philip Mark Breedlove (born September 21, 1955) is a retired four-star general in the United States Air Force who served as the commander of U.S. European Command, as well as the 17th Supreme Allied Commander Europe (SACEUR) of NATO Allied Command Operations, from May 2013 until May 4, 2016. He previously served as the commander of U.S. Air Forces Europe, which he concurrently served as commander of U.S. Air Forces Africa, commander of Air Component Command, Ramstein, and director of Joint Air Power Competence Center. He previously served as the 36th vice chief of staff of the United States Air Force from January 14, 2011, to July 27, 2012. On May 10, 2013, in a ceremony in Stuttgart, Germany, Breedlove took over the command of USEUCOM. Three days later, on May 13, 2013, he assumed command as SACEUR.

On March 11, 2016, NATO's Atlantic Council designated US Army General Curtis Scaparrotti as Breedlove's successor.

== Biography ==
=== Early life ===
Breedlove was born in 1955 in Atlanta, Georgia, and raised in Forest Park, Georgia. He received his commission after graduating from the Georgia Institute of Technology in 1977 where he was a member of Pi Kappa Alpha.

=== Early career (1978-1990) ===
Breedlove chose a career in the USAF as soon as he graduated from college. From March 1978 and through the next year, he was a student, undergraduate pilot training, at Williams Air Force Base in Arizona. From March until August of the next year, he was in pilot instructor training at Randolph Air Force Base in Texas. From August 1979 to January 1983, he became a T-37 Tweet instructor pilot, evaluation flight examiner and runway supervisory unit controller at Williams. He then became an F-16 Fighting Falcon student pilot at MacDill Air Force Base in Florida until September 1983. After that, he transferred to Torrejon Air Base, Spain, from September 1983 to January 1985, where he was the F-16 aircraft commander and instructor pilot for the 614th Tactical Fighter Squadron.

Breedlove became an air liaison officer from January 1985 to March 1987 with the 602nd Air Support Operations Group, Kitzingen Army Airfield, West Germany. He later transferred to the 526th Tactical Fighter Squadron, Ramstein Air Base, West Germany, from March 1987 to January 1988. Eventually, he was Chief of Flight Safety, 316th Air Division, at Ramstein, until August 1988. For the next two years, he became first an F-16 flight commander, then assistant operations officer of the 512th Tactical Fighter Squadron, also at Ramstein. From August 1990 to July 1991, he was a student at the Air Command and Staff College located at Maxwell Air Force Base in Alabama. Also in that year, he earned his Master of Science degree in aeronautical technology from Arizona State University.

=== In the General Staff (1991–2013) ===
Beginning in July 1991 and going to May 1993, he was the Chief of Air Operations, United Nations Command and Republic of Korea/United States Combined Forces Command, Yongsan Army Garrison, South Korea.

Starting in May 1993, Breedlove was the commander of the 80th Fighter Squadron at Kunsan Air Base, South Korea. This position lasted until July 1994, when he became a student at the National War College, Fort Lesley J. McNair, Washington D.C. In June 1995, he became the operations officer, United States Pacific Command Division, Joint Staff, The Pentagon, Washington D.C., where he stayed until June. That next month, he became commander of the 27th Operations Group, Cannon Air Force Base, New Mexico. From June 1999 to May 2000, he was the executive officer to the Commander, Headquarters Air Combat Command, Langley Air Force Base, Virginia. For the next year, he was the commander of the 8th Fighter Wing, Kunsan Air Base, South Korea. Beginning in June 2001 and lasting for the next year, he was the senior military assistant to the Secretary of the Air Force, Headquarters United States Air Force, Washington D.C. In 2001–2002, he attended MIT Seminar XXI.

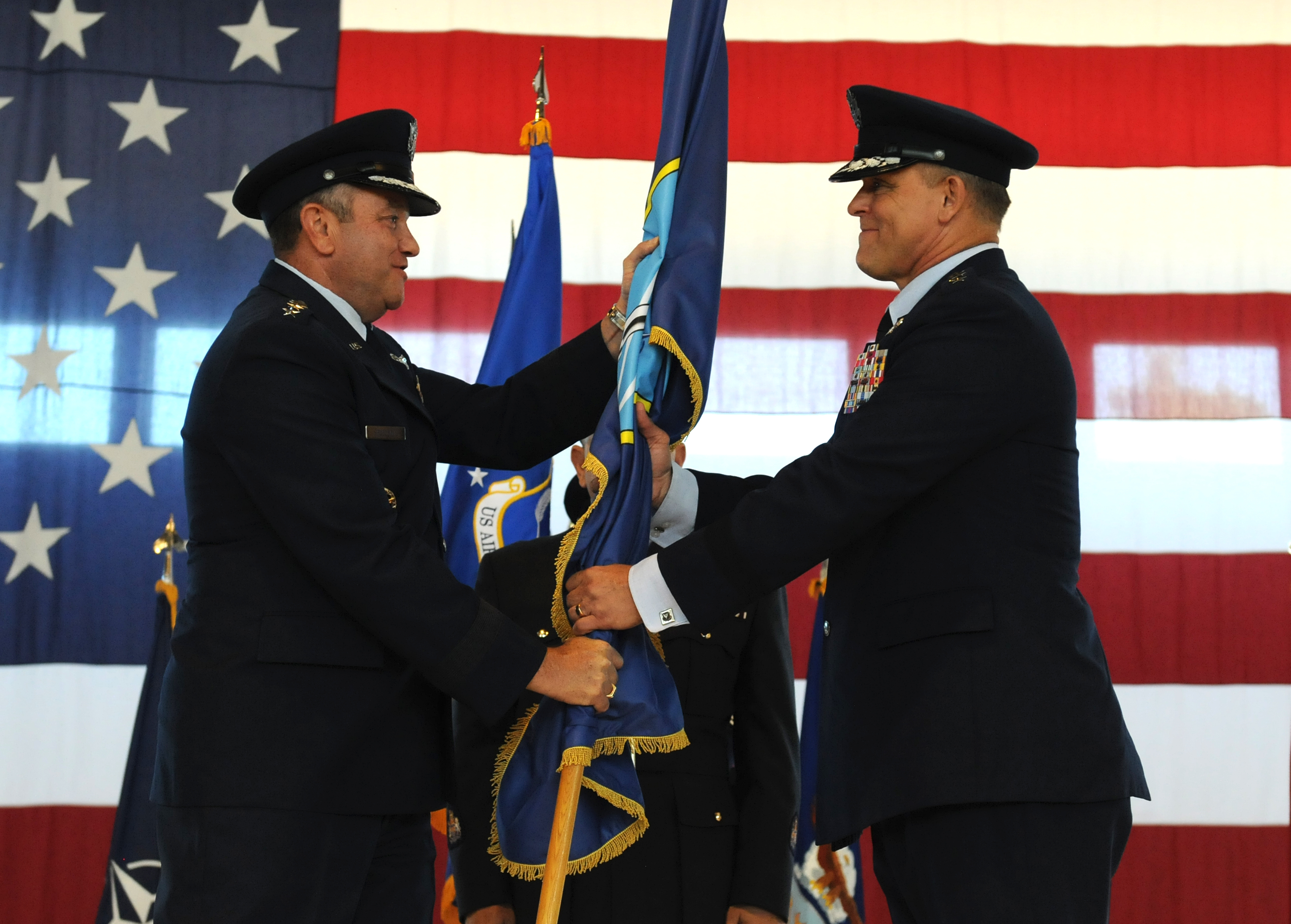
Breedlove at Ramstein Air Base, Germany, 2 August 2013

From June 2002 to June 2004, he was commander of the 56th Fighter Wing, located at Luke Air Force Base in Arizona. Then for the next year, he became commander of the 31st Fighter Wing, Aviano Air Base, Italy. He then became the vice commander of the 16th Air Force at Ramstein Air Base, Germany, from June 2005 to October 2006. His next assignment, which lasted until July 2008, had him as the Vice Director for Strategic Plans and Policy, Joint Staff, The Pentagon, Washington D.C. From July 2008 to August 2009, he was the commander of the 3rd Air Force, located at Ramstein Air Base, Germany. In August 2009, he began serving as the Deputy Chief of Staff for Operations, Plans and Requirements, Headquarters United States Air Force, Washington D.C.

On January 14, 2011, Breedlove started his term as Vice Chief of Staff of the United States Air Force. His promotion to general also was effective that day.

In July 2012 Breedlove left his position as Vice Chief of Staff to become commander of the United States Air Forces in Europe.

=== NATO Supreme Commander (2013-2016) ===
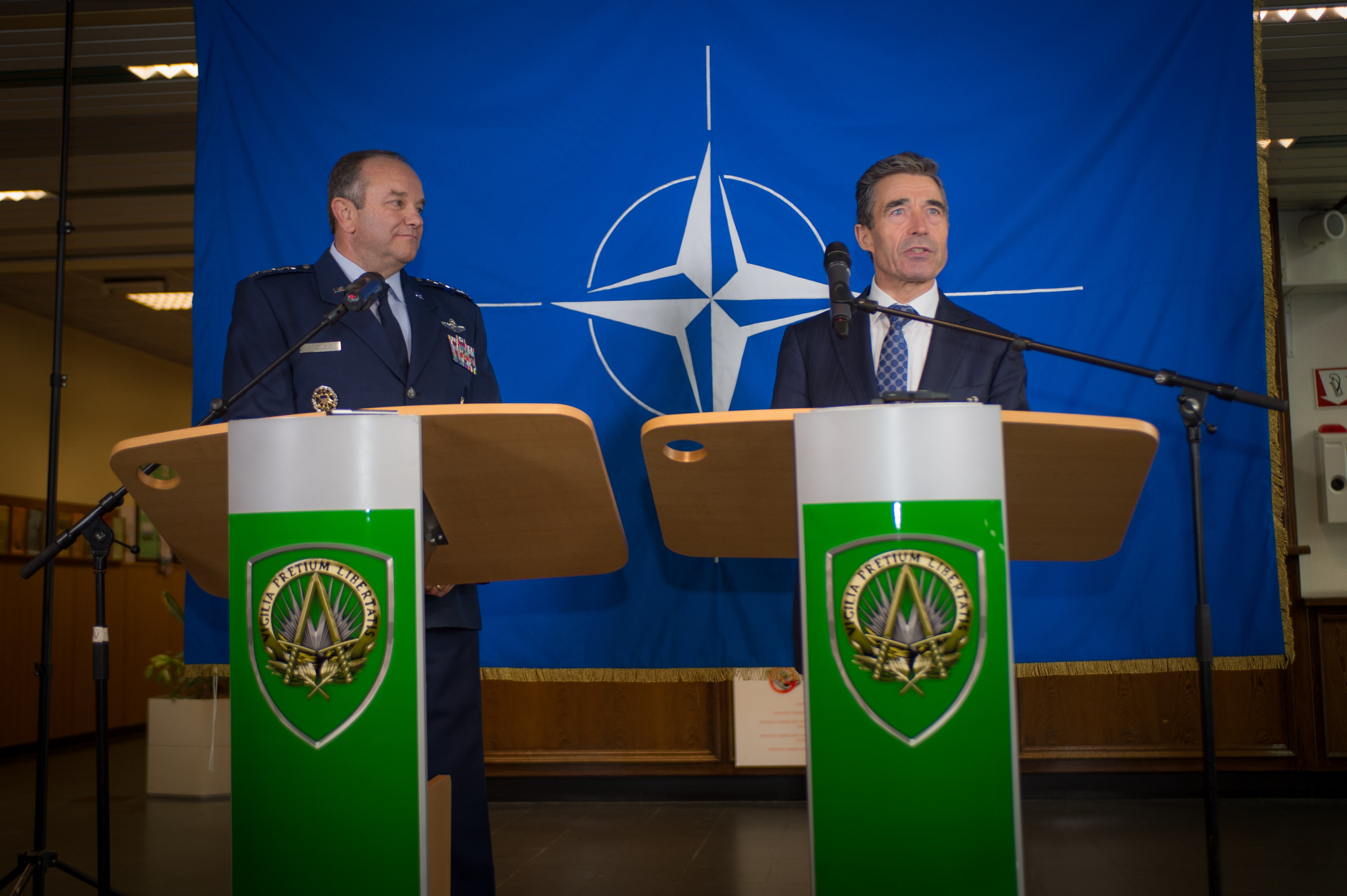
Breedlove with NATO Secretary General Anders Fogh Rasmussen, May 1, 2013

In May 2013 the Obama administration nominated Breedlove to assume command of U.S. European Command and NATO Allied Command Operations as the Supreme Allied Commander Europe. In that capacity, he was stationed at SHAPE Headquarters outside Mons, Belgium.

He is regularly quoted in western media. In July 2013, he told the BBC about his views on the longevity of the Afghan war. In April 2014, he spoke with CNN regarding the Russian troop buildup on the Ukrainian border.

In March 2015 he spoke on Ukrainian 1+1 channel on which he said that Russia has militarized Crimea.

In May 2015, he told the Atlantic Council that freedom is being challenged by "a revanchist Russia embarked on a reaching revision of what once were shared hopes for a stable and mutually beneficial partnership." In February 2016, during his testimony before the House Armed Services Committee, he said that "the U.S. military must rebuild in Europe to face a more aggressive Russia, which has chosen to be an adversary and poses a long-term existential threat to the United States".

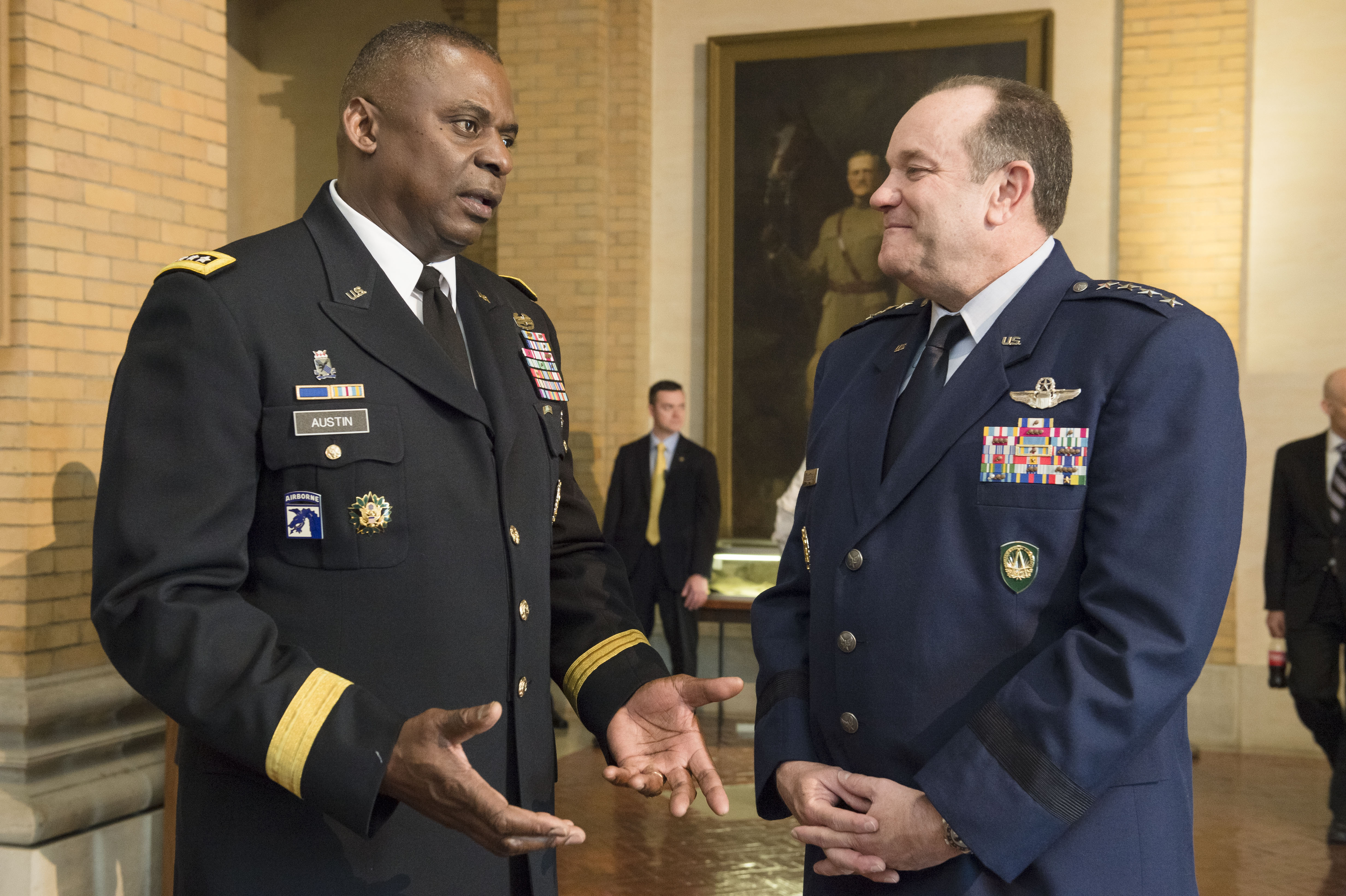
Supreme Allied Commander Europe General Philip M. Breedlove with commander of Central Command General Lloyd Austin during strategic dialogue meeting at the National War College, May 8, 2014

On 11 March 2016, the North Atlantic Council designated US Army General Curtis Scaparrotti as Breedlove's successor. Scaparrotti took command in Europe on 4 May 2016.

=== Retirement activities ===
Breedlove is on the board of directors at the Atlantic Council, as well as being an advisory board member of Spirit of America, a 501(c)(3) organization that supports the safety and success of Americans serving abroad and the local people and partners they seek to help. Breedlove is also on the board of advisors of the Center for a New American Security (CNAS), a think tank funded by the likes of Northrop Grumman, Neal Blue of General Atomics, Lockheed Martin, and the U.S. government, among other governments and corporations.

==== On Ukraine ====
Speaking with a panel on the topic of the Ukraine border crisis at the Atlantic Council in December 2018, he outlined a range of measures which should be considered to counter Russian aggression such as financial targeting of certain Russian oligarchs, professionalization of Ukrainian military units, and providing to the Armed Forces of Ukraine shore-based cruise missiles and long-range precision artillery.

In March 2022, days after the Russian invasion of Ukraine began, Breedlove was one of the first voices to ask for a no-fly zone over Ukraine. In the "Open Letter Calling for Limited No-Fly Zone" signed by 26 other colleagues, he stated that a "U.S.- NATO enforced No-Fly Zone to protect humanitarian corridors and additional military means for Ukrainian self-defense are desperately needed, and needed now."

In June 2022 Breedlove appeared on a radio programme with Times of London and called for a muscular approach to the Putinian wheat crisis, which was rooted in blockade of the Port of Odesa by the Russian Black Sea Fleet, and chiefly affected Middle Eastern and North African countries.

In June 2024 Breedlove, John Herbst, and 39 others suggested a Ukraine policy for NATO, as its 75th annual summit got under way in Washington.

In August 2024 Breedlove was the chief signatory of a letter to President Biden in which the group decried "unintentionally seizing defeat from the jaws of victory". They said that the US "was providing enough weaponry to ensure a stalemate but not sufficient to help Ukraine recapture territory seized by Russia," while they "argue the administration is inhibited by fear of triggering a Russian escalation."

== Awards ==
Breedlove received the Golden Plate Award of the American Academy of Achievement presented by Awards Council member General Joseph W. Ralston, USAF, in 2014.

On May 1, 2015, Breedlove was presented with the Atlantic Council's Distinguished Military Leadership Award.

== Decorations ==
US Air Force Command Pilot Badge
SACEUR Badge
Joint Chiefs of Staff Badge
Headquarters Air Force badge

Defense Distinguished Service Medal
Air Force Distinguished Service Medal with bronze oak leaf cluster
Defense Superior Service Medal
Legion of Merit with three bronze oak leaf clusters
Defense Meritorious Service Medal with bronze oak leaf cluster
Meritorious Service Medal with three bronze oak leaf clusters
Aerial Achievement Medal
Joint Service Commendation Medal
Air Force Achievement Medal
Joint Meritorious Unit Award with bronze oak leaf cluster
Air Force Outstanding Unit Award with four bronze oak leaf clusters
Combat Readiness Medal with bronze oak leaf cluster
National Defense Service Medal with bronze service star
Global War on Terrorism Service Medal
Korea Defense Service Medal
Air Force Overseas Short Tour Service Ribbon with two bronze oak leaf clusters
Air Force Overseas Long Tour Service Ribbon with four bronze oak leaf clusters
Air Force Longevity Service Award with one silver and three bronze oak leaf clusters
Air Force Training Ribbon
Commander's Cross of the Order of Merit of the Republic of Poland
1st Class of the Order of the Cross of the Eagle (Estonia)
Order of Merit of the Italian Republic, Grand Officer
Order of the Golden Fleece (Georgia)
NATO Meritorious Service Medal
Inter-American Defense Board Medal with one gold service star

== Effective dates of promotion ==
Insignia	Rank	Date
	General	Jan. 14, 2011
	Lieutenant general	July 21, 2008
	Major general	June 23, 2006
	Brigadier general	Oct. 1, 2003
	Colonel	Jan. 1, 1998
	Lieutenant colonel	June 1, 1993
	Major	Nov. 1, 1988
	Captain	Dec. 10, 1981
	First lieutenant	Dec. 10, 1979
	Second lieutenant	June 1, 1977

== See also ==
- List of commanders of USAFE

Military offices
Preceded by Robert D. Bishop Jr.	Commander of Third Air Force; 2006–2008	Succeeded by Frank Gorenc
Preceded by Daniel J. Darnell	Deputy Chief of Staff for Operations, Plans and Requirements of the United States Air Force; 2009–2011	Succeeded by Herbert J. Carlisle
Preceded by Carrol H. Chandler	Vice Chief of Staff of the United States Air Force; 2011–2012	Succeeded by Larry O. Spencer
Preceded by Mark A. Welsh III	Commander of United States Air Forces in Europe; 2012–2013	Succeeded by Noel T. Jones; Acting
Position established	Commander of United States Air Forces in Africa; 2013	Succeeded by Noel T. Jones; Acting
Preceded by James G. Stavridis	Commander of the United States European Command and Supreme Allied Commander Europe; 2013–2016	Succeeded by Curtis M. Scaparrotti
