= Attorney General Johnston =

Attorney General Johnston may refer to:

- Alexander Johnston (1775–1849), Attorney General of British Ceylon
- Augustus Johnston (1729–1790), Attorney General of the Colony of Rhode Island and Providence Plantations
- William Agnew Johnston (1848–1937), Attorney General of Kansas

== See also ==
- Attorney General Johnson (disambiguation)
