= Carrol Chandler =

United States Air Force general (born 1952)

Carrol H. Chandler
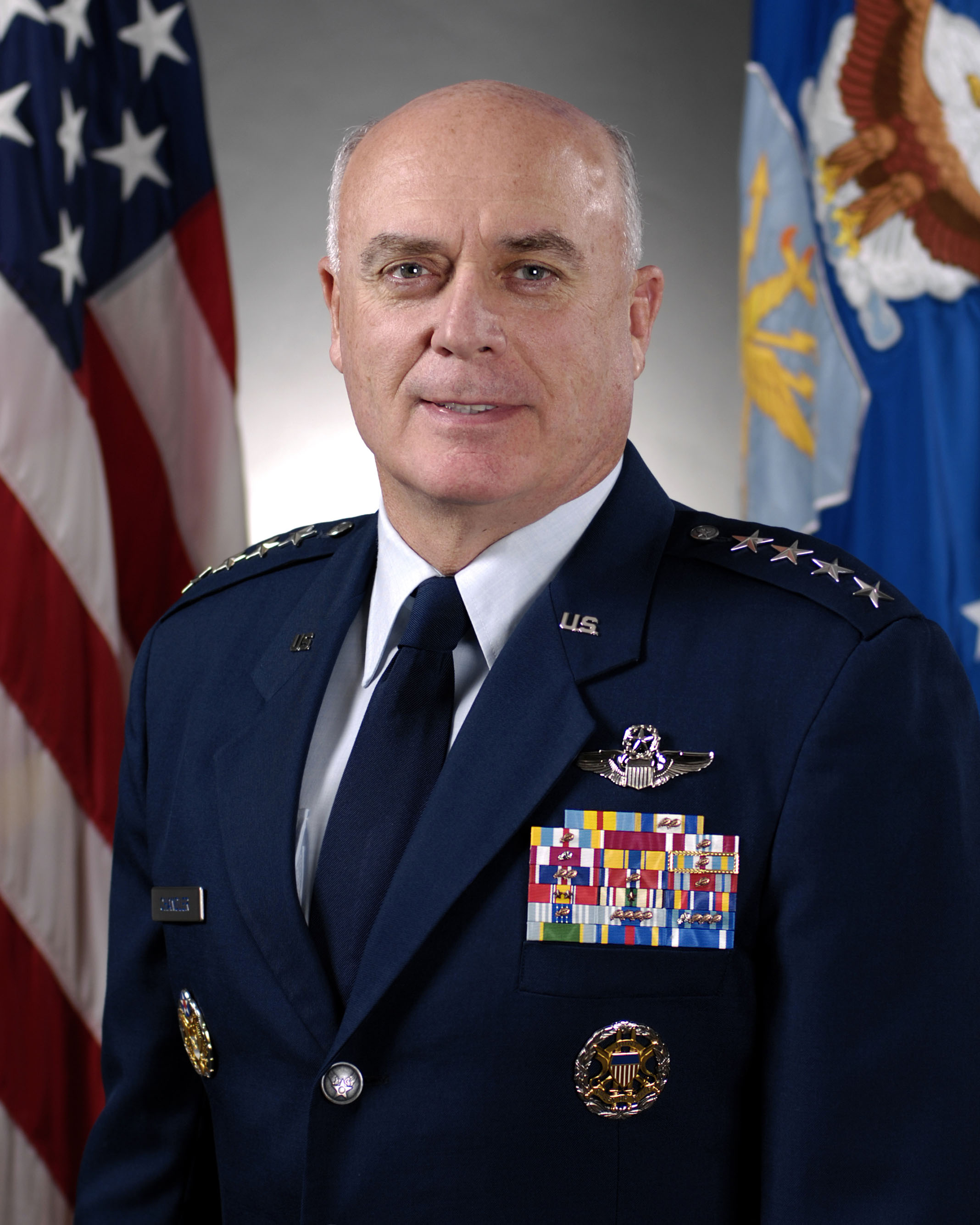
- Chandler in 2009
- Born: March 16, 1952 (age 74)
- Military career
- Allegiance: United States of America
- Branch: United States Air Force
- Service years: 1974–2011
- Rank: General
- Nickname: "Howie"
- Commands: Vice Chief of Staff of the Air Force; U.S. Pacific Air Forces; Deputy Chief of Staff for Operations, Plans and Requirements; Alaskan Command
- Awards: Defense Distinguished Service Medal; Air Force Distinguished Service Medal (4); Defense Superior Service Medal (2); Legion of Merit; Defense Meritorious Service Medal (2); Meritorious Service Medal (6)

Carrol Howard "Howie" Chandler (born March 16, 1952), is a retired United States Air Force four-star general. He last served as the 35th Vice Chief of Staff of the Air Force from August 27, 2009, to January 14, 2011. He previously served as commander of Pacific Air Forces from November 2007 to August 20, 2009, and deputy chief of staff for operations, plans and requirements from October 23, 2005, to November 29, 2007. As vice chief, he presided over the Air Staff and served as a member of the Joint Chiefs of Staff Requirements Oversight Council and Deputy Advisory Working Group. He assisted the chief of staff with organizing, training, and equipping of 680,000 active-duty, Guard, Reserve and civilian forces serving in the United States and overseas. He retired from the Air Force by March 1, 2011. In 2012 he joined Pratt & Whitney Military Engines as vice president for military business development and international programs.

== Background ==
Chandler grew up in Carthage, Missouri, and entered the U.S. Air Force in 1974 after graduating from the United States Air Force Academy. He has commanded a numbered air force, two fighter wings, a support group and a fighter squadron. His previous staff assignments include two tours at Headquarters Pacific Air Forces and at the Pentagon, as well as tours at Headquarters United States Pacific Command, Headquarters U.S. Military Training Mission in Saudi Arabia and Headquarters Allied Air Forces Southern Europe. Prior to assuming his current position, General Chandler served as commander of Alaskan Command, Alaskan North American Aerospace Defense Command Region, 11th Air Force and Joint Task Force – Alaska with headquarters at Elmendorf Air Force Base, Alaska. The general is a command pilot with more than 3,900 flying hours in the T-38, F-15 and F-16.

== Education ==
- 1974 Bachelor of Science degree, U.S. Air Force Academy, Colorado Springs, Colorado
- 1978 Master of Arts degree in management, Webster University
- 1978 Squadron Officer School, Maxwell AFB, Alabama
- 1982 Air Command and Staff College, by correspondence
- 1992 National War College, Fort Lesley J. McNair, Washington, D.C.
- 1997 Executive Program for General Officers of the Russian Federation and the United States, John F. Kennedy School of Government, Harvard University, Cambridge, Massachusetts
- 2003 Navy Senior Leader Business Course, Kenan-Flagler Business School, University of North Carolina at Chapel Hill

== Military assignments ==
- June 1974 – September 1975, student, Undergraduate Pilot Training, Laughlin AFB, Texas
- October 1975 – December 1978, T-38 instructor pilot and flight examiner, Laughlin AFB, Texas
- December 1978 – November 1981, instructor pilot and assistant operations officer, 560th Flying Training Squadron, Randolph AFB, Texas
- November 1981 – November 1983, squadron standardization officer, flight commander and wing flight examiner, 67th Tactical Fighter Squadron, Kadena Air Base, Japan
- November 1983 – May 1985, chief of Air-to-Air Tactics Branch, Directorate of Standardization and Evaluation, Headquarters Pacific Air Forces, Hickam AFB, Hawaii
- May 1985 – September 1985, aide-de-camp to the Commander-in-Chief, U.S. Pacific Command, Camp H.M. Smith, Hawaii
- September 1985 – January 1987, Air Force aide to the Chairman of the Joint Chiefs of Staff, the Joint Staff, Washington, D.C.
- January 1987 – August 1987, assistant operations officer, 44th Tactical Fighter Squadron, and chief of Standardization and Evaluation Division, 18th Wing, Kadena AB, Japan
- August 1987 – June 1988, operations officer, 67th Tactical Fighter Squadron, Kadena AB, Japan
- June 1988 – January 1990, commander of 44th Fighter Squadron, Kadena AB, Japan
- January 1990 – August 1991, chief of Operations Inspection Division, Office of the Inspector General, Headquarters Pacific Air Forces, Hickam AFB, Hawaii
- June 1992 – August 1994, chief of Air Force Division, Headquarters U.S. Military Training Mission, and senior U.S. Air Force adviser to the Royal Saudi Air Force, Riyadh, Saudi Arabia
- August 1994 – May 1995, commander of 554th Support Group, Nellis AFB, Nevada
- May 1995 – April 1996, commander of 33rd Fighter Wing, Eglin AFB, Florida
- April 1996 – July 1998, commander of 56th Fighter Wing, Luke AFB, Arizona
- August 1998 – November 1999, chief of staff, Headquarters Allied Air Forces Southern Europe, Naples, Italy
- November 1999 – March 2000, assistant chief of staff for operations, A-3 Division, Headquarters Allied Air Forces Southern Europe, Naples, Italy
- April 2000 – October 2000, director for expeditionary aerospace force implementation, Deputy Chief of Staff for Air and Space Operations, Headquarters U.S. Air Force, Washington, D.C.
- October 2000 – May 2001, director of operational plans, deputy chief of staff for air and space operations, Headquarters U.S. Air Force, Washington, D.C.
- May 2001 – September 2002, director of aerospace operations, Headquarters Air Combat Command, Langley AFB, Virginia
- September 2002 – May 2003, commander of Alaskan Command, Alaskan North American Aerospace Defense Command Region and 11th Air Force, Elmendorf AFB, Alaska
- May 2003 – October 2005, commander of Alaskan Command, Alaskan North American Aerospace Defense Command Region, 11th Air Force and Joint Task Force – Alaska, Elmendorf AFB, Alaska
- October 2005 – November 2007, deputy chief of staff for operations, plans and requirements, Headquarters U.S. Air Force, Washington, D.C.
- November 2007 – August 2009, commander of Pacific Air Forces; air component commander for U.S. Pacific Command; and executive director of Pacific Air Combat Operations Staff, Hickam AFB, Hawaii
- August 2009 – January 2011, Vice Chief of Staff of the U.S. Air Force, Washington, D.C.

== Awards and decorations ==
Command Air Force Pilot Badge
Office of the Joint Chiefs of Staff Identification Badge
Headquarters Air Force Badge

Defense Distinguished Service Medal
Air Force Distinguished Service Medal with three bronze oak leaf clusters
Defense Superior Service Medal with oak leaf cluster
Legion of Merit
Defense Meritorious Service Medal with oak leaf cluster
Meritorious Service Medal with silver oak leaf cluster
Air Force Commendation Medal
Joint Meritorious Unit Award with one oak leaf cluster
Air Force Outstanding Unit Award with two oak leaf clusters
Air Force Organizational Excellence Award with oak leaf cluster
Combat Readiness Medal with oak leaf cluster
National Defense Service Medal with two bronze service stars
Southwest Asia Service Medal with bronze service star
Global War on Terrorism Service Medal
Air Force Overseas Short Tour Service Ribbon with oak leaf cluster
Air Force Overseas Long Tour Service Ribbon with four oak leaf clusters
Air Force Longevity Service Award with silver and three bronze oak leaf clusters
Small Arms Expert Marksmanship Ribbon
Air Force Training Ribbon
NATO Medal for Former Yugoslavia

== Dates of promotion ==
- Second lieutenant June 5, 1974
- First lieutenant June 5, 1976
- Captain June 5, 1978
- Major August 1, 1984
- Lieutenant colonel May 1, 1987
- Colonel April 1, 1991
- Brigadier general February 22, 1997
- Major general February 1, 2000
- Lieutenant general November 1, 2002
- General November 30, 2007

== Notes ==
Military offices
Preceded by Gen. Paul V. Hester	Commander, Pacific Air Forces; 2007 - 2009	Succeeded by Lt. Gen. Gary L. North
Preceded by Gen. William M. Fraser III	Vice Chief of Staff of the United States Air Force; 2009 - 2011	Succeeded by Gen. Philip M. Breedlove
