= Attorney General Johnson =

Attorney General Johnson may refer to:

- George A. Johnson (1829–1894), Attorney General of California
- Isaac Johnson (politician) (1803–1853), Attorney General of Louisiana
- J. B. Johnson (Florida politician) (1868–1940), Attorney General of Florida
- John Mercer Johnson (1818–1868), Attorney General of New Brunswick
- Lee Johnson (Oregon judge) (1930–2009), Attorney General of Oregon
- Ovid F. Johnson (1807–1854), Attorney General of Pennsylvania
- Pierre-Marc Johnson (born 1946), Attorney General of Quebec
- Reverdy Johnson (1796–1876), Attorney General of the United States
- Royal C. Johnson (1882–1939), Attorney General of South Dakota
- Sveinbjorn Johnson (1883–1946), Attorney General of North Dakota
- Walter R. Johnson (1897–1974), Attorney General of Nebraska
- William Moore Johnson (1828–1918), Attorney General for Ireland

== See also ==
- General Johnson (disambiguation)
- Attorney General Johnston (disambiguation)
- Helgi Johanneson (1906–1994), Attorney General of North Dakota
