= Abner Aust =

American flying ace (1921–2020)

Abner Maurice Aust Jr.
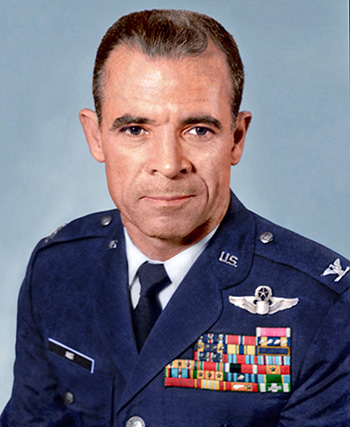
- Born: October 7, 1921; Scooba, Mississippi, U.S.
- Died: June 16, 2020 (aged 98); Lakeland, Florida, U.S.
- Burial place: Sarasota National Cemetery
- Military career
- Allegiance: United States of America
- Branch: United States Air Force
- Service years: 1942–1972
- Rank: Colonel
- Units: 506th Fighter Group; 366th Tactical Fighter Wing; 31st Tactical Fighter Wing
- Commands: 6002nd Standardization Evaluation Group; 33rd Tactical Fighter Wing; 366th Tactical Fighter Wing; 31st Tactical Fighter Wing; 475th Air Base Wing; 314th Air Division; 3rd Tactical Fighter Wing
- Conflicts: World War II; Vietnam War
- Awards: Legion of Merit; Distinguished Flying Cross (4); Bronze Star Medal; Meritorious Service Medal; Air Medal (26)

Abner Maurice Aust Jr. (October 7, 1921 – June 16, 2020) was an American flying ace in the 506th Fighter Group during World War II, and a career fighter pilot in the United States Air Force. During World War II, Aust flew Very Long Range (VLR) fighter missions from Iwo Jima and was one of the last pilots to become flying aces in the war. During Vietnam War, Aust commanded two fighter wings and flew more than 300 combat missions.

He retired in 1972 at the rank of colonel, after 30 years of distinguished service.

== Early life ==
Aust was born October 7, 1921, in Scooba, Mississippi. His family moved to Oklahoma in 1926 and after graduation from high school in 1940, he then enrolled at Sunflower Junior College in Moorhead, Mississippi. As a college student, he joined the Civilian Pilot Training Program and completed pilot training on June 15, 1942.

== Military career ==
Aust enlisted in the Aviation Cadet Program of the U.S. Army Air Forces on June 23, 1942. He was sent to Santa Ana Army Air Base in California and completed flight training and earned his wings. On April 12, 1943, he was commissioned as a 2nd lieutenant. Next, he was assigned to Fort Myers, Florida for combat training in the Curtiss P-40 Warhawk. In November 1943, he was promoted to the rank of 1st lieutenant. Afterwards, he became a flight instructor at Venice, Florida, and was later promoted to captain.

=== World War II ===
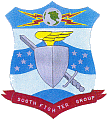
506th Fighter Group

Aust joined the 457th Fighter Squadron of the 506th Fighter Group as a North American P-51 Mustang pilot at Lakeland Army Air Field, Florida, in October 1944. He was assigned with his unit to Tinian in the Mariana Islands in February. During this time, the squadron flew missions against the island of Chichi Jima. In March 1945, the squadron arrived at North Field in Iwo Jima.

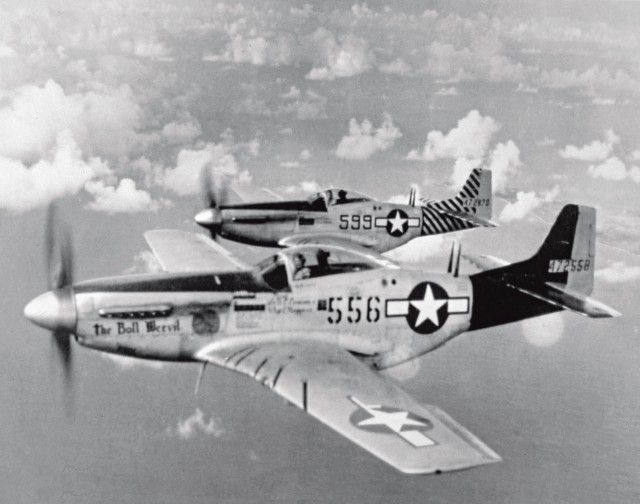
P-51 Mustangs of 506th FG

Aust flew long-range missions over Japan. On June 1, he flew with a B-29 Superfortress that navigated 144 P-51s on their way from Iwo Jima to the coast of Japan. Halfway to target, they encountered heavy squalls that went from sea level to above 25,000 feet. The P-51s tried to fly in formation through the weather, but Aust and the B-29 pilot poured on the power and broke out above 25,000 feet. He saw eleven P-51 pilots managed to get above the turbulence and escorted them back to Iwo Jima. When the mission was over, 27 pilots and 29 planes had been lost and the mission was nicknamed 'Black Friday'.

He experienced his first enemy aircraft encounter on July 16, 1945, over Nagoya. During the aerial combat while leading two flights of P-51s, Aust engaged six Nakajima Ki-84 'Franks' and managed to shoot down three of them. In the same mission, he was attacked by friendly fire from another P-51, resulting in damage to his aircraft. As a result, his directional unit and radio was knocked out, and he barely was able to return to North Field.

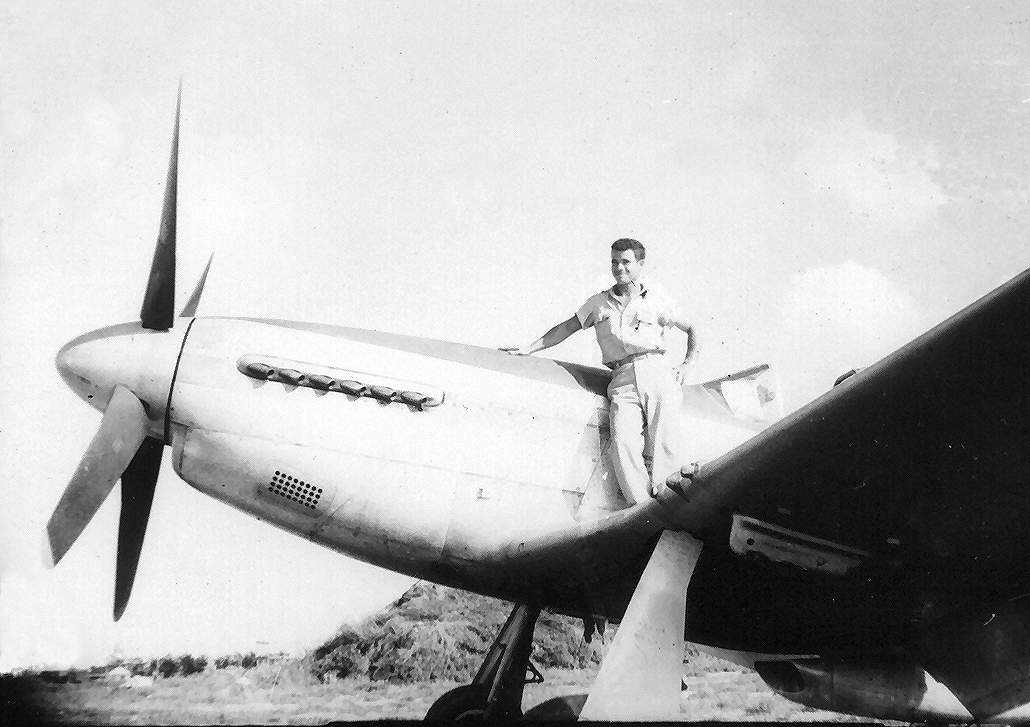
Aust with his P-51 Mustang

His second and last encounter with enemy aircraft happened on August 10, 1945, during a VLR mission escorting B-29 Superfortresses to the northeast of Tokyo. Aust shot down a Mitsubishi A6M Zero at 25,000 feet. He quickly spotted another Zero and made two passes, damaging it both times. After the second pass, the Zero dived into clouds and disappeared. Aust was able to spot a third Zero, get behind it, and shoot it down over an airfield for his second victory of the day, and his fifth aerial victory of the war. At the end of the mission, Aust claimed two A6M Zeros shot down. This was his last combat mission of World War II. At the time, only one of his two victories was officially confirmed as his aircraft armorer maintaining his plane, erroneously set the gun camera film at 75 frames per second instead of the normal speed of 16 frames per second. Because of this, Aust's gun camera film only provided proof of the first Zero shot down at 25,000 feet, and the two passes made on the second Zero that disappeared in the clouds. The gun camera film ran out before he shot down the third Zero over the Japanese airfield. Aust did not have an American eyewitness or gun camera film to corroborate his claim of shooting down the second Zero.

In 1960s, with a help of his brother-in-law, they were able to collect evidence from local Japanese officials that the enemy aircraft shot down by Aust had crashed, and at the location was a grave with the pilot's date of death listed as August 10, 1945. After submitting this additional evidence to the Air Force Board for the Correction of Military Records, the United States Air Force officially credited Aust with his fifth aerial victory and retroactively became a flying ace, thereby making him one of the last flying aces of World War II.

On August 14, 457th FS escorted B-29s on their last mission against Japan. The following day, on August 15, Emperor of Japan Hirohito announced the surrender of Japan.

During World War II, Aust flew a total of 14 Very Long Range (VLR) missions from Iwo Jima. He was credited with the destruction of 5 enemy aircraft in aerial combat and another 3 destroyed on the ground, while strafing enemy airfields. On several other missions, he was credited with destroying several locomotives, at least three large fishing boats and damaging one destroyer. He is the only flying ace of the 506th Fighter Group.

=== Post war ===
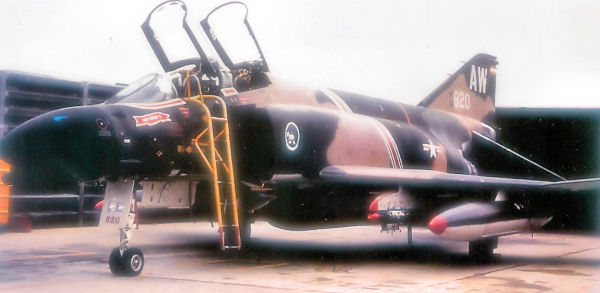
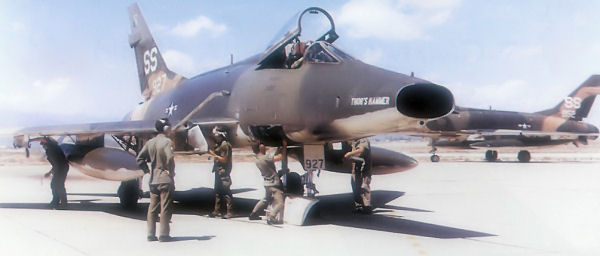
F-4 Phantom II of 366th TFW (left) and F-100 Super Sabre of 31st TFW (right).

After his return to U.S., Aust was assigned to 22nd Fighter Squadron at Howard Field in Panama Canal Zone, flying Republic P-47 Thunderbolts. The squadron upgraded to jet aircraft in December 1947 with the arrival of the Lockheed F-80 Shooting Star. During his time with the squadron from May 1946 to December 1948, he was stationed in West Germany, during the Berlin Blockade.

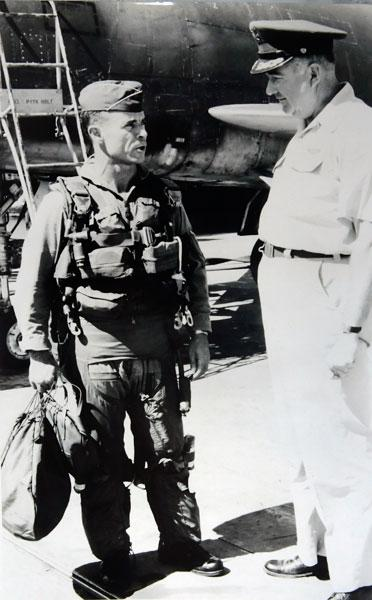
Aust (left) as commanding officer of 31st TFW, during Vietnam War

Aust remained in the Air Force following the war and served in a variety of command and staff positions over the next 27 years, including serving as an Aircraft Maintenance Officer with Military Assistance Advisory Group in Denmark from December 1951 to July 1954. He attended Air Command and Staff College at Maxwell Air Force Base in Alabama from August 1954 to July 1955. Promoted to colonel on November 17, 1963, he first served as deputy commander and then commander of the 6002nd Standardization Evaluation Group at Kadena Air Base, Okinawa, from September 1963 to June 1965.

He then commanded the 33rd Tactical Fighter Wing at Eglin Air Force Base, Florida in 1967. During Vietnam War, Aust served as an F-4 Phantom II pilot and vice commander of the 366th Tactical Fighter Wing at Da Nang Air Base, South Vietnam from January to May 1968, and then as a North American F-100 Super Sabre pilot and commander of the 31st Tactical Fighter Wing at Tuy Hoa Air Base, South Vietnam, from May 1968 to February 1969. Aust flew 324 combat missions over Vietnam flying the F-4s in primarily radar bombing, and close air support bombing and strafing missions while flying the F-100 Super Sabre.

After his tour in Vietnam, he was sent to South Korea, where he served as vice commander of the 314th Air Division at Osan Air Base, from September 1970 to March 1971, and then commanded the 475th Air Base Wing at Misawa Air Base, Japan in 1971. He later served as commander of 3rd Tactical Fighter Wing at Kunsan Air Base, South Korea.

After returning to U.S in December 1971, he served as special assistant to the commander of the 31st Combat Support Group at Homestead Air Force Base, Florida, from December 1971 until his retirement from the Air Force on July 1, 1972.

== Later life ==
Aust was married to Brenda Aust his second wife until their divorce in 1987. Aust later remarried Doris Maddox his third wife in April 2003, the day that he was sentenced on the solicitation of murder charge. The two later divorced on August 6. He had five children from his first marriage. He had one child with his second wife Brenda Aust, a son Dale Aust.

After his retirement from the Air Force, Aust's life was marred with legal issues. In 2000, he was arrested and convicted for soliciting a man to burn down his ex-wife Brenda's house. While in prison, he was charged again for trying to convince a convict to poison her. Aust would serve 8 years in prison and was released on 2009.

In 2015, he along with other flying aces received the Congressional Gold Medal, in recognition of "their heroic military service and defense of the country's freedom throughout the history of aviation warfare."

Aust died on June 16, 2020, at the Lakeland Memorial Hospital after a brief illness, at the age of 98. He is buried with full military honors at Sarasota National Cemetery.

== Aerial victory credits ==
Date	#	Type	Location	Aircraft flown	Unit Assigned
July 16, 1945	3	Nakajima Ki-84	Nagoya, Japan	P-51D Mustang	457 FS, 506 FG
August 10, 1945	2	Mitsubishi A6M	Tokyo, Japan	P-51D Mustang	457 FS, 506 FG

SOURCES: Air Force Historical Study 85: USAF Credits for the Destruction of Enemy Aircraft, World War II

== Awards and decorations ==
During his lengthy career, Aust earned many decorations, including:

U.S. Air Force Command Pilot Badge
Legion of Merit	Distinguished Flying Cross w/ 3 bronze oak leaf clusters	Bronze Star
Meritorious Service Medal	Air Medal w/ 4 silver oak leaf clusters	Air Medal w/ 4 bronze oak leaf clusters (second ribbon required for accoutrement spacing)
Air Force Commendation Medal	Air Force Presidential Unit Citation w/ 1 bronze oak leaf cluster	Air Force Outstanding Unit Award with Valor device and 3 bronze oak leaf clusters
Air Force Outstanding Unit Award (second ribbon required for accoutrement spacing)	Combat Readiness Medal	American Campaign Medal
Asiatic-Pacific Campaign Medal w/ 3 bronze campaign stars	World War II Victory Medal	Army of Occupation Medal w/ 'Germany' and 'Japan' clasps
National Defense Service Medal w/ 1 bronze service star	Armed Forces Expeditionary Medal w/ 1 bronze service star	Vietnam Service Medal w/ 1 silver campaign star
Korean Defense Service Medal	Air Force Longevity Service Award w/ silver and bronze oak leaf clusters	Small Arms Expert Marksmanship Ribbon
Unidentified decoration	Vietnam Air Force Distinguished Service Order (2nd Class)	Republic of Vietnam Gallantry Cross w/ Palm and 1 Gold Star
Vietnam Armed Forces Honor Medal (1st Class)	Vietnam Gallantry Cross Unit Citation	Vietnam Campaign Medal
