= David M. Rodriguez =

US Army general (born 1954)

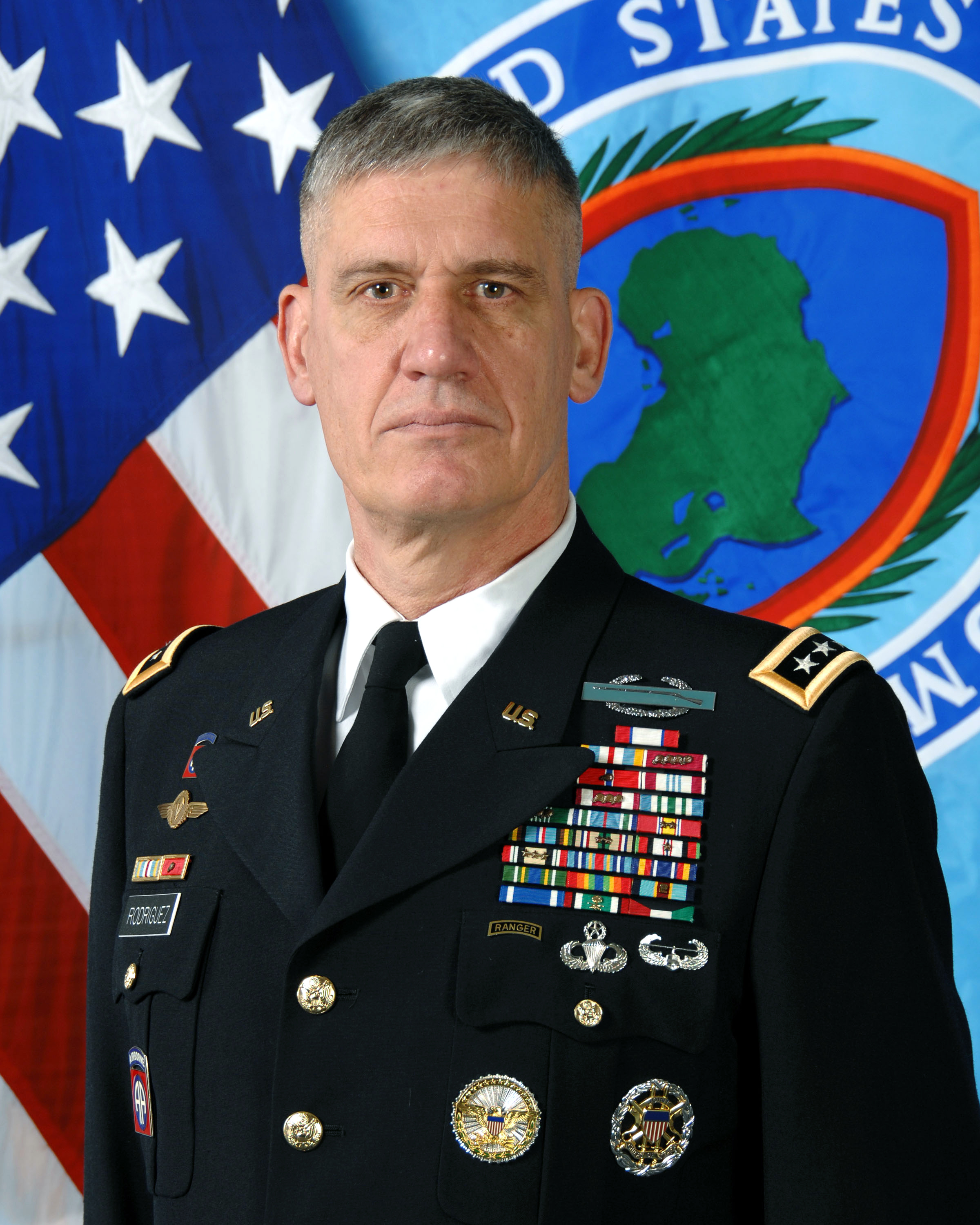
- Official portrait, 2013
- Born: 23 May 1954 (age 72); Overbrook, Philadelphia, U.S.
- Military career
- Allegiance: United States
- Branch: United States Army
- Service years: 1976–2016
- Rank: General
- Commands: United States Africa Command; United States Army Forces Command; 82nd Airborne Division; International Security Assistance Force Joint Command; United States Forces – Syria
- Conflicts: Invasion of Panama; Gulf War; War in Afghanistan; Iraq War
- Awards: Defense Distinguished Service Medal (3); Army Distinguished Service Medal (2); Defense Superior Service Medal; Legion of Merit (5); Bronze Star Medal (2)

David Mitchell "Rod" Rodriguez (born 23 May 1954) is a retired United States Army four-star general who served as the Commander of the United States Africa Command from April 2013 till August 2016.

Rodriguez served as the Commanding General of the United States Army Forces Command from 12 September 2011 until 15 March 2014. He has also served as Commander, International Security Assistance Force Joint Command (IJC) and Deputy Commander, United States Forces – Afghanistan (USFOR-A) from 12 November 2009 to 11 July 2011. General Rodriguez retired in August 2016 after 40 years of service.

== Early life and education ==
Born in Overbrook, Pennsylvania on 23 May 1954 and raised in West Chester, Pennsylvania, Rodriguez earned his commission from the United States Military Academy at West Point, New York in 1976. He was recruited by Tom Cahill to play for the Army Black Knights football team and earned varsity letters in football and baseball.

== Military career ==
Rodriguez commanded at every level across the United States Army. His assignments included the Commanding General of the United States Army Forces Command, the International Security Assistance Force – Joint Command (IJC) in Afghanistan, the 82nd Airborne Division, the 2nd Brigade, 82nd Airborne Division, and the 2nd Battalion, 502nd Infantry Regiment, 101st Airborne Division (Air Assault). He also commanded companies of the 75th Ranger Regiment, and 1st Armored Division.

Rodriguez's extensive combat experiences include: G-3 Planner, XVIII Airborne Corps, Operation Just Cause, 1989 – 1990; Operations Officer, 1st Battalion, 505th Parachute Infantry Regiment, 82nd Airborne Division, Desert Shield/Desert Storm, 1990 – 1991; Assistant Division Commander, 4th Infantry Division (Mechanized), 2002 – 2003; Commander, Multi-National Division-Northwest, 2005; Special Assistant to the Commander, Multi-National Corps-Iraq, 2006; Commander, Combined Joint Task Force-82 in Afghanistan, 2007 – 2008; and Deputy Commander, United States Forces Afghanistan and Commander, International Security Assistance Force Joint Command.

Rodriguez holds a Master of Arts in National Security and Strategic Studies from the United States Naval War College and a Masters of Military Art and Science from the United States Army Command and General Staff College.

On 11 November 2011, Rodriguez received the Abraham Lincoln Award during a Veterans Day celebration at the Union League of Philadelphia. Union Leagues were founded during the Civil War to support President Abraham Lincoln and the preservation of the Union; Philadelphia's, established in 1862, was the first. First presented to Major General Ulysses S. Grant, the award, which recognizes patriotism and service to country, has been bestowed on many distinguished civilian and military leaders, including former Chairman of the Federal Reserve, Alan Greenspan; Supreme Court Justice Clarence Thomas, General David H. Petraeus, and General Raymond T. Odierno.

=== Dates of rank ===
United States Military Academy class of 1976

Second lieutenant	First lieutenant	Captain	Major	Lieutenant colonel
O-1	O-2	O-3	O-4	O-5
2 June 1976	2 June 1978	1 August 1980	1 September 1987	1 April 1993

Colonel	Brigadier general	Major general	Lieutenant general	General
O-6	O-7	O-8	O-9	O-10
1 August 1997	1 March 2002	15 July 2005	29 July 2008	15 August 2011

== Awards and decorations ==
Rodriguez' military decorations include:

- Combat Infantryman Badge
- Expert Infantryman Badge
- Master Parachutist Badge
- Air Assault Badge
- Ranger Tab
- Joint Chiefs of Staff Identification Badge
- United States Africa Command Badge
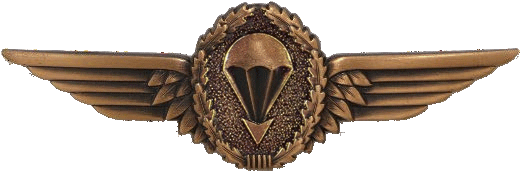
- German Parachutist Badge in bronze
- 82nd Airborne Division CSIB
- 82nd Airborne Division DUI
- 10 Overseas Service Bars

Defense Distinguished Service Medal (with two bronze oak leaf clusters)
Army Distinguished Service Medal (with bronze oak leaf cluster)
Defense Superior Service Medal
Legion of Merit (with four bronze oak leaf clusters)
Bronze Star Medal (with oak leaf cluster)
Defense Meritorious Service Medal
Meritorious Service Medal (with four oak leaf clusters)
Joint Service Commendation Medal
Army Commendation Medal (with two oak leaf clusters)
Joint Service Achievement Medal
Joint Meritorious Unit Award
Meritorious Unit Commendation (with oak leaf cluster)
National Defense Service Medal (with one bronze service star)
Armed Forces Expeditionary Medal
Southwest Asia Service Medal (with service star)
Afghanistan Campaign Medal (with three service stars)
Iraq Campaign Medal (with two service stars)
Global War on Terrorism Expeditionary Medal
Global War on Terrorism Service Medal
Korea Defense Service Medal
Army Service Ribbon
Army Overseas Service Ribbon (with bronze award numeral "5")
NATO Medal for Former Yugoslavia
National Defence Medal in gold with bronze palm (France)
Kuwait Liberation Medal (Saudi Arabia)
Kuwait Liberation Medal (Kuwait)

Military offices
Preceded by William B. Caldwell IV	Commanding General of the 82nd Airborne Division; 2006–2008	Succeeded by Curtis Scaparrotti
Preceded by Peter W. Chiarelli	Senior Military Assistant to the Secretary of Defense; 2008–2009	Succeeded by Joseph D. Kernan
New title	Commander of the International Security Assistance Force Joint Command; 2009–2011	Succeeded by Curtis Scaparrotti
New title	Deputy Commander of United States Forces – Afghanistan; 2009–2011	Succeeded by Curtis Scaparrotti
Preceded by Howard B. Bromberg; Acting	Commanding General of the United States Army Forces Command; 2011–2013	Succeeded by Daniel B. Allyn
Preceded by Carter F. Ham	Commander of the United States Africa Command; 2013–2016	Succeeded by Thomas D. Waldhauser
