= Sarasota National Cemetery =

Veterans cemetery in Sarasota, Florida

- Interactive map of Sarasota National Cemetery

Details
- Established: June 1, 2008
- Location: 9810 State Road 72; Sarasota, FL 34241
- Country: United States
- Coordinates: 27°14′43″N 82°22′43″W
- Type: United States National Cemetery
- Owned by: United States Department of Veterans Affairs
- Size: 295 acres (119 ha)
- No. of interments: >25,000
- Website: Official website
- Find a Grave: Sarasota National Cemetery

Sarasota National Cemetery is a 295-acre (119 ha) United States National Cemetery located in Sarasota County, Florida. Administered by the United States Department of Veterans Affairs, it is the sixth national cemetery developed in Florida.

== History ==
The Veterans Administration was authorized to establish six new burial sites by the National Cemetery Expansion Act of 2003, enacted on November 11, 2003. Areas not served by an existing National Cemetery and having at least 170,000 veteran residents included:

- Bakersfield, California
- Birmingham, Alabama
- Jacksonville, Florida
- Sarasota County, Florida
- Southeastern Pennsylvania
- Columbia-Greenville, South Carolina

Groundbreaking and dedication at the Sarasota site was held on June 1, 2008. The first interment was on January 9, 2009.

== Site status ==
The plan for development of the facility is composed of three phases, but only the first phase has been funded, at $27.8 million to accommodate 25,000 burials. Initial construction on those 60 acres (0.24 km^{2}) began in June 2008 and created space for 18,200 casket burials within 15,200 designated crypts, 7,000 columbarium niches, and 500 in-ground cremations. The grounds were consecrated in December 2008, prior to the first burials.

Phase one includes an entrance, roadways within the section, a public information center with restrooms, and two solar-powered shelters for committal services during inclement weather. Infrastructure consisting of drainage, landscaping, irrigation, and utilities also is being built. Permanent buildings for administration and maintenance were scheduled for completion in 2010.

The 2,800-seat ceremonial amphitheater "Patriot Plaza", donated by The Patterson Foundation of Sarasota, was completed June 28, 2014.

== Notable burials ==
- Abner M. Aust (1921–2020), United States Air Force colonel and flying ace in World War II
- Rick Casares (1931–2013), United States Army soldier in the Korean War and professional football player
- Thomas P. Maguire (1947–2024), Adjutant General of New York
- Marty Springstead (1937–2012), United States Army veteran and Major League Baseball umpire
- Hal White (1919–2001), United States Navy veteran of World War II, and Major League Baseball pitcher
