= George Johnson (general) =

United States Air Force major general (1918–2021)

George Marvin Johnson Jr.
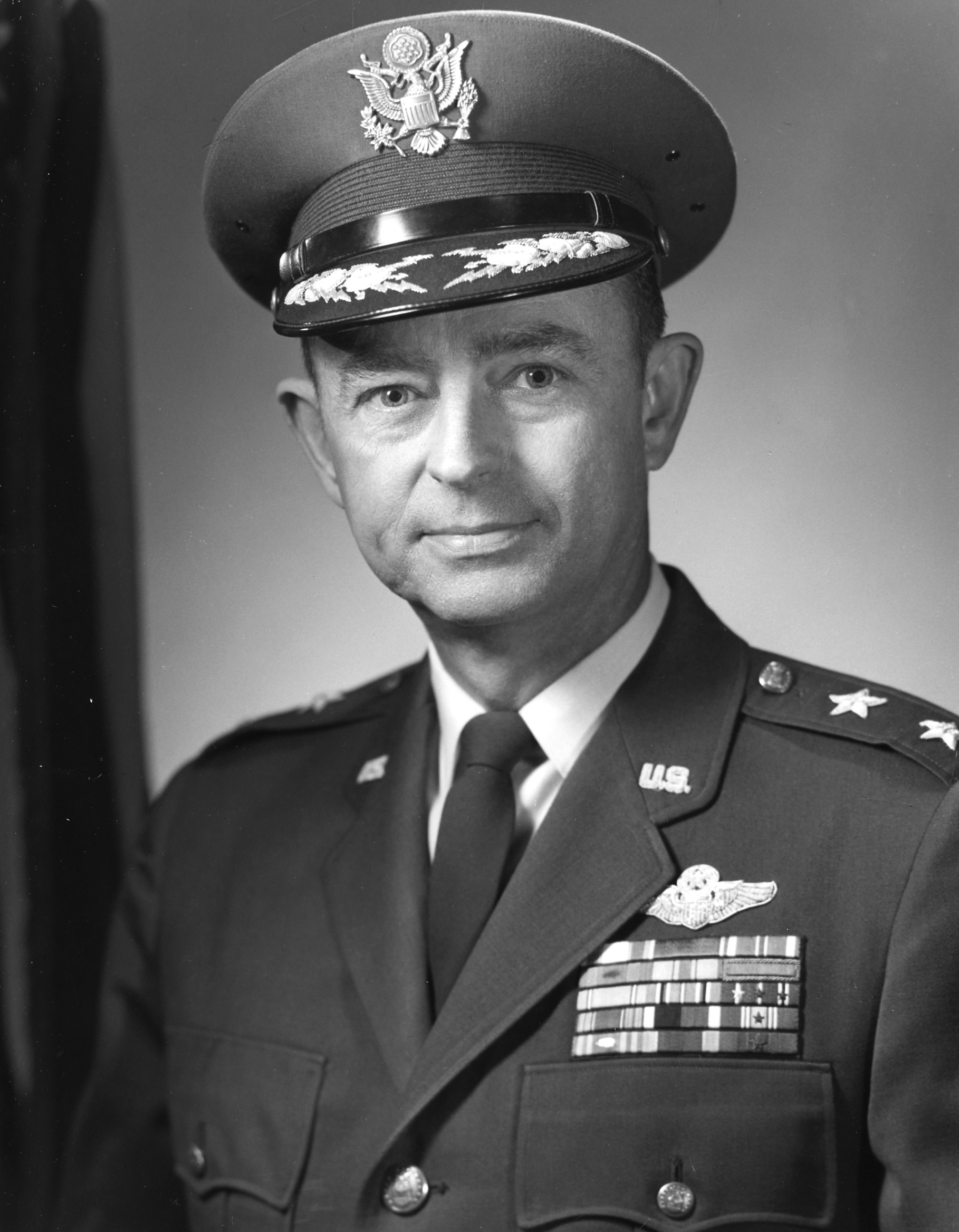
- Born: April 11, 1918; Fort Valley, Georgia, U.S.
- Died: July 9, 2021 (aged 103) Florida, U.S.
- Allegiance: United States of America
- Branch: United States Air Force
- Service years: 1941–1975
- Rank: Major general
- Commands: Military Assistance Advisory Group
- Conflicts: World War II

George Marvin Johnson Jr. (April 11, 1918 – July 9, 2021) was a United States Air Force major general who served as chief, Military Assistance Advisory Group in Italy. He was a graduate of the North Georgia College, University of Maryland and George Washington University. Johnson turned 100 in April 2018 and died in Florida in July 2021 at the age of 103.
