= James H. Johnson Jr. =

US Army general (1937-2023)

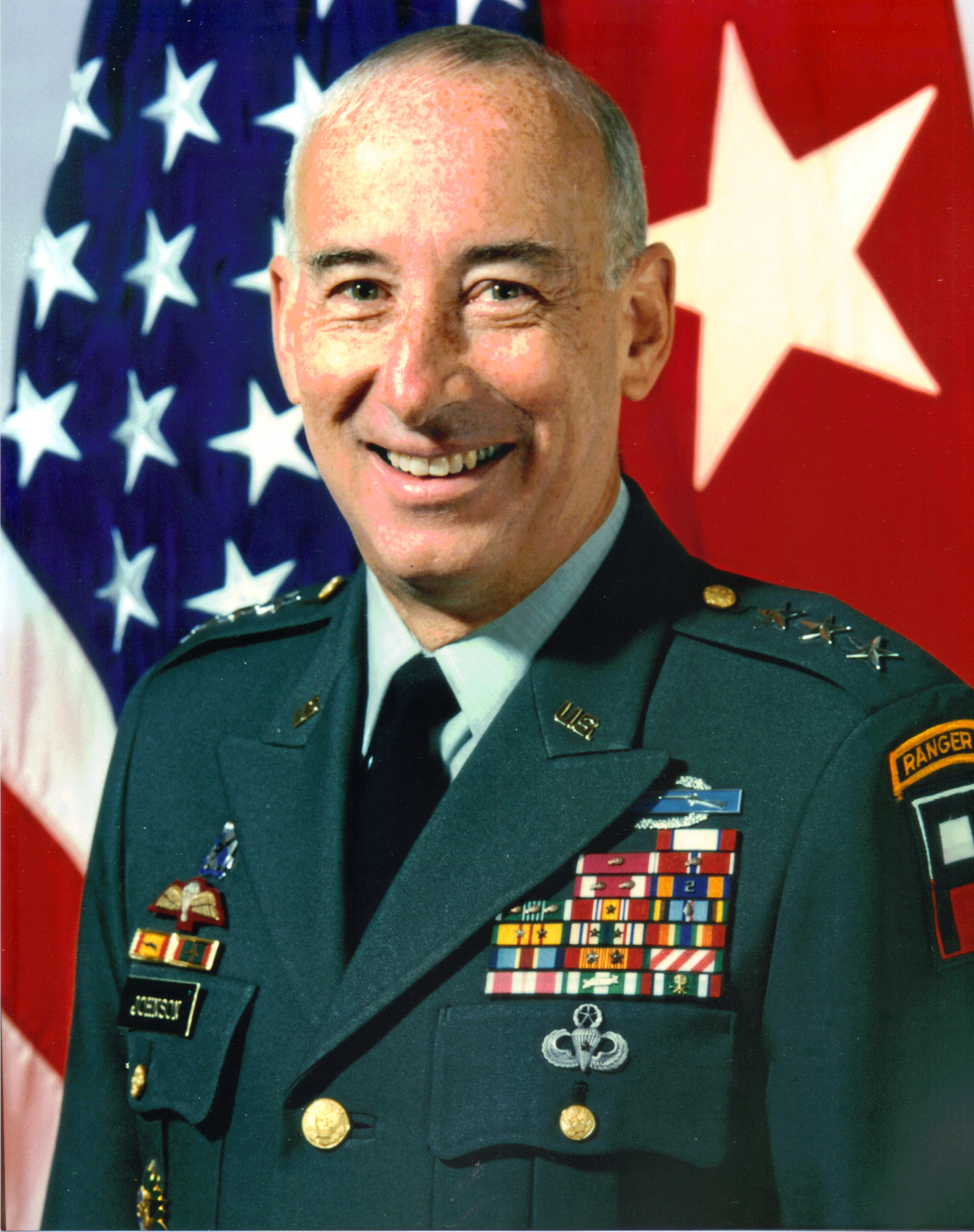
- Johnson in 1992 as the Commanding General of the First U.S. Army
- Born: 16 December 1937; Tuscaloosa, Alabama, U.S.
- Died: 18 August 2023 (aged 85)
- Burial place: Sarasota National Cemetery
- Military career
- Allegiance: United States
- Branch: United States Army
- Service years: 1960–1993
- Rank: Lieutenant General
- Commands: First United States Army; 82nd Airborne Division; 505th Parachute Infantry Regiment
- Conflicts: Vietnam War; United States invasion of Panama; Gulf War
- Awards: Army Distinguished Service Medal (2); Legion of Merit (2); Bronze Star Medal (2)

James Houston Johnson Jr. (16 December 1937 – 18 August 2023) was a retired lieutenant general in the United States Army. He had over 33 years of active military service, culminating as Commanding General of the First United States Army, responsible for 325,000 soldiers, from 1991 to 1993.

== Personal life ==
Johnson was born on 16 December 1937, in Tuscaloosa, Alabama. He graduated from the United States Military Academy at West Point, New York, in 1960 and was commissioned in the infantry. He was also a graduate of the Armor Career Course, the Armed Forces Staff College and the Army War College. He attained a Master of Science degree in Public Administration from Shippensburg State College in 1979. His son is retired Lieutenant Colonel James H. Johnson III, who was reduced in rank in retirement from Colonel, following his court martial for fraud and bigamy.

== Military career ==
Johnson served as a troop leader in the 82nd Airborne Division at every level, from Rifle Platoon Leader to Airborne Division Commander. He commanded the 505th Parachute Infantry Regiment for three years, longer than anyone in the history of the Regiment, from 1980 to 1983. He commanded the 82nd Airborne Division longer than anyone since World War II, from 1988 to 1991.

During his career, he was in combat on four separate occasions. This includes two tours in Vietnam: first, as an Advisor in the Mekong Delta in 1966 to 1967 and, later, an Infantry Battalion S3 with the 101st Airborne Division (Air Assault), operating in the Ruong-Ruong Valley, just south of the Demilitarized Zone (DMZ) in 1969 to 1970.

As Assistant Division Commander for Operations of the 82nd Airborne Division, Johnson commanded all Army Forces during Operation Golden Pheasant, a show of force in Honduras in 1988.

As Commanding General of the 82nd Airborne Division, he became the only modern-day Commander to lead a division in combat in two separate conflicts. In 1989, he was the first jumper during the night airborne assault of Panama, known as Operation Just Cause. In 1990 to 1991, he led the division during Operations Desert Shield and Desert Storm in the Persian Gulf.

== Awards and decorations ==
Among his military awards and decorations, Johnson was awarded the Army Distinguished Service Medal (with one OLC), the Legion of Merit (with one OLC), the Bronze Star Medal (with one OLC), the Meritorious Service Medal (with two OLC's), the Army Commendation Medal (with three OLC's) and the Air Medal (with one OLC). Johnson earned the Combat Infantry Badge, the Expert Infantry Badge, the Master Parachutist Badge with Gold Combat Star, the Ranger Tab, the Jungle Expert Patch and the Army Staff Identification Badge. He also received British and Egyptian parachutist badges.

In 2019, Johnson was inducted into the 82nd Airborne Division's Hall of Fame.

== Post-military life ==
After retirement from active duty in 1993, Johnson's service to the nation continued in the Balkans as Director of a Joint Civil-Military Training Program for the Croatian Armed Forces. Later, he served as the Secretary of Defense's personal representative to the former Soviet Republics of Kazakhstan and Uzbekistan in Central Asia.

In 2000, Johnson was nominated as the Honorary Colonel of the Regiment to the 505th Parachute Infantry Regiment.

Johnson died on 18 August 2023, and was buried with full military honors at Sarasota National Cemetery on 28 September 2023.
