= James H. Johnson (major general) =

United States Army general

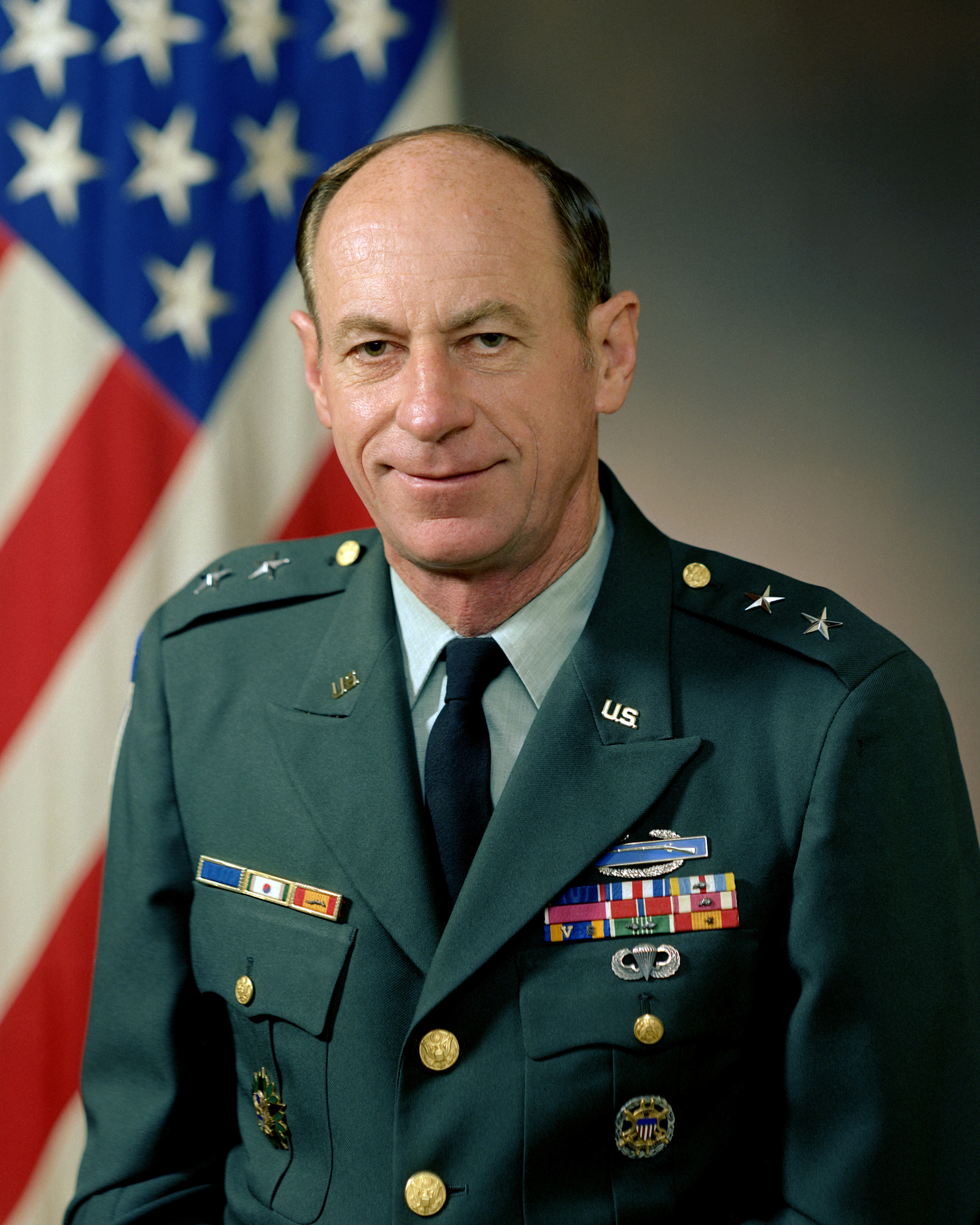
- Born: 24 May 1929; Washington, D.C. U.S.
- Died: 27 June 2008 (aged 79); Murrells Inlet, South Carolina
- Military career
- Allegiance: United States
- Branch: United States Army
- Service years: 1950–1980s
- Rank: Major General
- Commands: 2nd Infantry Division; 3rd Brigade, 82nd Airborne Division; 4th Battalion, 503rd Infantry Regiment, 173rd Airborne Brigade
- Conflicts: Vietnam War

James Harry Johnson (24 May 1929 – 27 June 2008) was a major general in the United States Army. His assignments included Assistant Deputy Chief of Staff for Operations and Plans at the US Army Headquarters. Johnson is an alumnus of the University of Maryland, where he earned a B.S. degree in physical education in 1950. He graduated from the Army Command and General Staff College in 1960.

Johnson was awarded the Distinguished Service Cross, Silver Star Medal, Bronze Star Medal and six Air Medals for his actions in combat. He served with the 4th Battalion, 503rd Infantry Regiment, 173rd Airborne Brigade in Vietnam as a lieutenant colonel.

Johnson died in his sleep at Tidelands Waccamaw Community Hospital on June 27, 2008.
