= John D. Johnson (general) =

American lieutenant general

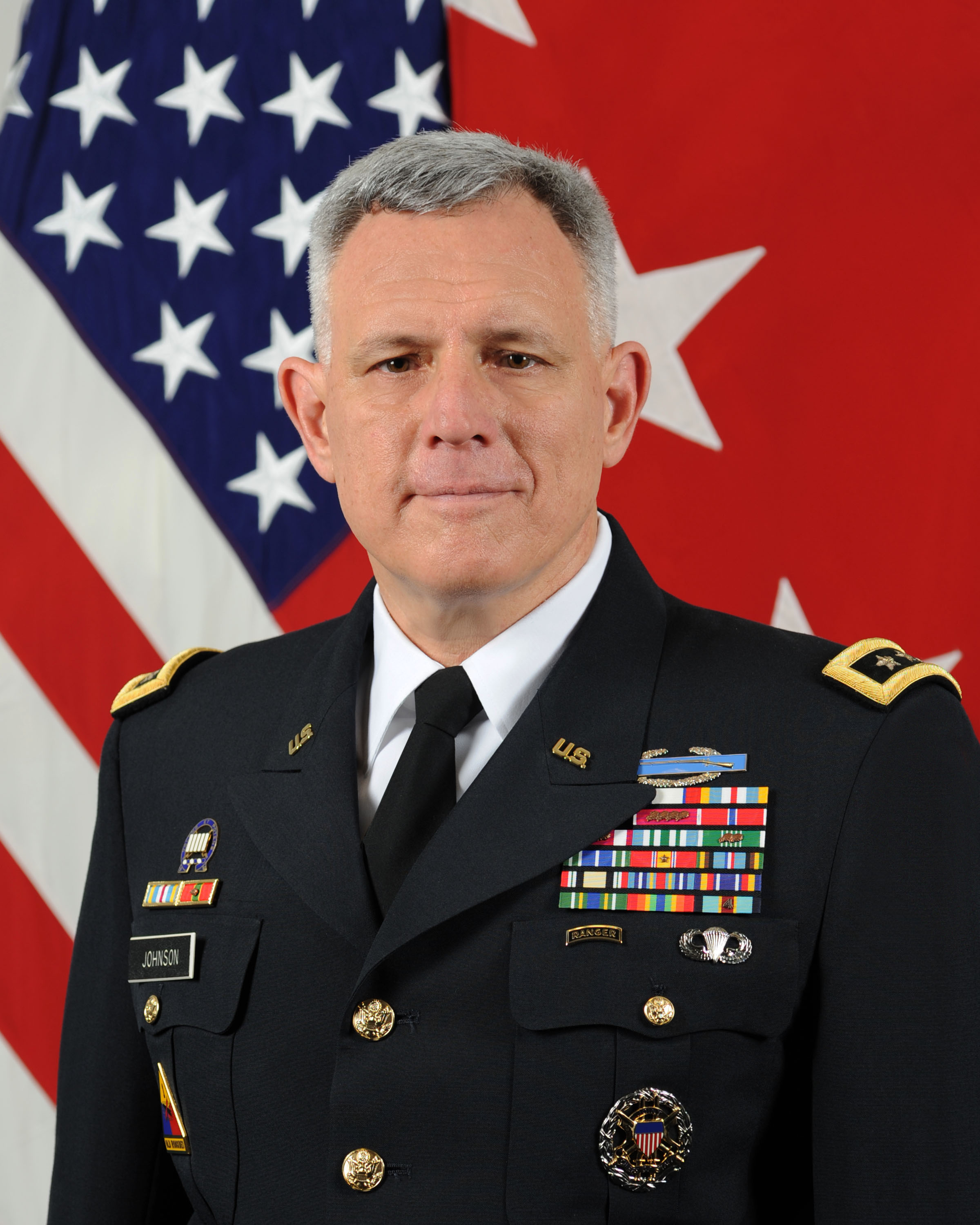
- Born: November 18, 1952 (age 73); Detroit, Michigan
- Military career
- Allegiance: United States
- Branch: United States Army
- Service years: 1977–2015
- Rank: Lieutenant General
- Commands: Joint Improvised Explosive Device Defeat Agency; Eighth United States Army
- Conflicts: Iraq War; War in Afghanistan
- Awards: Army Distinguished Service Medal (3); Defense Superior Service Medal; Legion of Merit (5); Bronze Star Medal

John Daniel Johnson is a retired American lieutenant general of the United States Army. He was director of the Joint Improvised Explosive Device Defeat Agency from July 2013 to July 2015.

Previously, Johnson was the commanding general of the Eighth United States Army and the Chief of Staff for United Nations Command, Combined Forces Command, and United States Forces Korea. He has served in numerous command, staff, and teaching assignments throughout the world, including in Germany, Iraq, and South Korea.

== Early life and education ==
Johnson grew up in Texas and Oklahoma and holds a bachelor's degree in history from the Virginia Military Institute. He was commissioned as an infantry second lieutenant upon graduation in 1977. He has a master's degree in strategic studies from the United States Army War College and two master's degrees from the United States Army Command and General Staff College.

== Career ==
As a company grade officer, Johnson was an infantry platoon leader, scout platoon leader, and company commander with the 1st Battalion, 30th Infantry Regiment, 3rd Infantry Division in Schweinfurt, Germany. He then served as a small group tactics instructor at the United States Army Infantry School at Fort Benning, Georgia, followed by tenure as an observer/controller at the Army's National Training Center, Fort Irwin, California. His next operational assignment was as the division war plans officer for the 8th Infantry Division, Bad Kreuznach, Germany. He later served as a brigade operations officer in the 2nd Brigade, 1st Armored Division and as the executive officer for the 4th Battalion, 12th Infantry Regiment, in Baumholder, Germany.

Johnson next commanded the 2nd Battalion, 7th Infantry Regiment, 24th Infantry Division (later re-designated the 3rd Infantry Division) at Fort Stewart, Georgia, where he remained to serve as the division inspector general and operations officer. As the operations officer, he deployed with the division to the Middle East during Operation Desert Thunder in 1998. He then returned to Germany to serve as the V Corps operations officer in Heidelberg and commander of the 2nd Brigade Combat Team, 1st Armored Division in Baumholder. In 2003, he deployed the brigade in support of Operation Iraqi Freedom.

After returning to the United States from Iraq, Johnson served two tours at the Pentagon, first as the chief of the Strategy Division in the Deputy Directorate for the Global War on Terrorism on the Joint Staff. In the second tour, he served on the Army Staff as the deputy director for Strategy, Plans and Policy.

As a brigadier general in 2006, Johnson was assigned as the assistant division commander for maneuver of the 2nd Infantry Division in Korea. Upon returning from Korea, he assumed the position of deputy commanding general for the Army's Family and Morale, Welfare and Recreation Command. He later became the deputy commanding general (operations) for I Corps and Fort Lewis, Washington. He deployed in that role with the corps as the Headquarters for Multi-National Corps – Iraq. He returned to Joint Base Lewis-McChord, where he served as the acting commanding general of I Corps and Joint Base Lewis-McChord.
