= Brigade La Fayette =

Joint unit of the French forces in Afghanistan

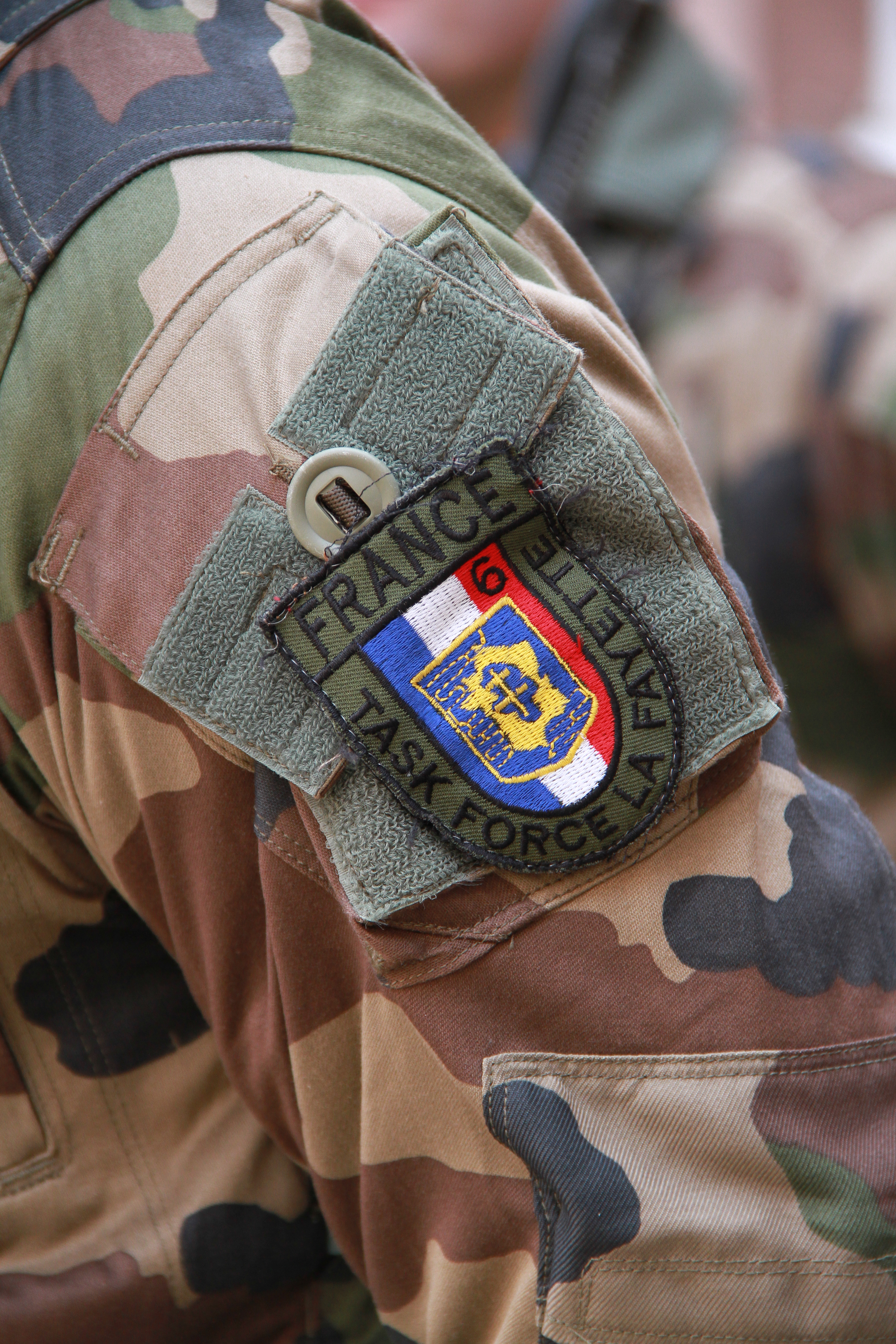
Brigade La Fayette shoulder patch

The Brigade La Fayette, also named Task Force La Fayette, was a joint unit of the French forces in Afghanistan. It was officially created on 1 November 2009, along with a complete reorganisation of the French military deployment in Afghanistan. It comprised most of the French Army units involved in the ISAF.

The unit was named in honour of Gilbert du Motier de La Fayette. Its headquarters is at Nijrab outpost, near Nijrab, in the Kapisa Province. It was headed by general Jean-Pierre Palasset.

The mission ended on 25 November 2012.

== Organisation ==
The Brigade La Fayette was responsible for the Surobi district and for the Kapisa Province. It operated under the US 1st Cavalry Division, which headed Regional Command East.

The brigade comprised two Joint Tactical Groups, each composed of three infantry companies and their support units:

- the groupement tactique interarmes de Kapisa
- the groupement tactique interarmes de Surobi, composed of units formerly known as "BatFra" and based in Kabul.

The brigade comprised over 2500 personnel, amounting to 75% of the French forces in Afghanistan. Most were based in outpost in Nijrab and Tagab, in Kapisa Province; in Tora in the Surobi district; and at Kabul airport. It also utilised combat outposts in Belda and in Rocco, jointly with the Afghan Army.

French Operational Mentoring Liaison Teams formerly operating in Wardak and Logar exchanged their duties with Embedded Training Teams that operated in the territory cared for by the Brigade. The brigade was especially linked to the 3rd Brigade of the 201st Corps (Afghanistan) of the Afghan National Army, deployed in Kapisa and Surobi.

Most of the gendarmes tasked with the training of Afghan police were also integrated in the brigade.

== See also ==
- Operation Septentrion
