= French forces in Afghanistan =

2001 to 2014 French presence in the War in Afghanistan

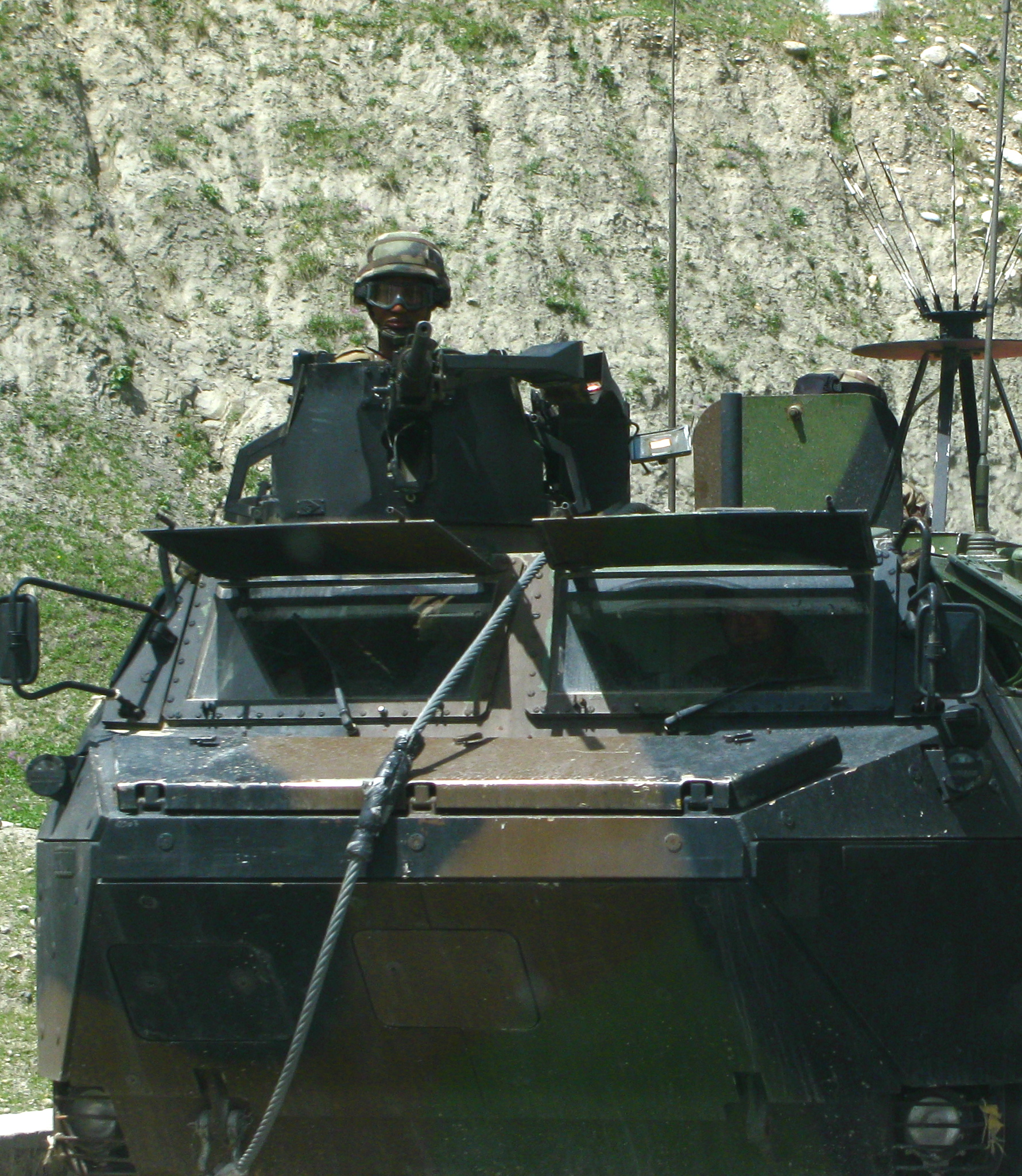
French VAB patrolling in Afghanistan in 2009.

French forces in Afghanistan were involved in the War in Afghanistan from late 2001 until fully withdrawing by 2014. They operated within two distinct frameworks:

- the International Security Assistance Force (ISAF), carried out by NATO on a United Nations mandate and
- "Operation Enduring Freedom", under US command, as part of the war on terror.

French forces contributed to both chapters in several national operations:

- Opération Pamir with the ISAF
- Opération Héraklès for the naval and air components
- Opération Épidote for training of the Afghan Army
- Opération Arès for special operations within "Operation Enduring Freedom"

As of 1 November 2009, 4,000 French personnel have been deployed to Afghanistan, including air support of Combined Task Force 150 in the Indian Ocean. Additionally, 150 gendarmes were deployed in late 2009.

Operations in 2009 alone cost 450 million euros, amounting to over half the 870 million euros devoted to military operations abroad. A total of 86 servicemen were killed.

In January 2012, after an Afghan soldier shot and killed four French soldiers in eastern Afghanistan, French president Nicolas Sarkozy threatened to suspend French operations in Afghanistan. In June 2012, newly elected president François Hollande announced that he would be withdrawing 2,000 of France's 3,400 troops in Afghanistan, leaving 1,400 for training and logistics. In November 2012, France's combat troops were withdrawn from Afghanistan, leaving only a logistical contingent.

== Mission ==
The official mission statement for the French military in Afghanistan was to

secure zones under their responsibility as to allow the Afghan State to rebuild itself, allow development operations, and allow the deployment of the services provided by the Afghan State (...) [and] allow a rise in power of the Afghan Army

French forces also supported anti-drug operations. When prisoners were captured during combat, they were surrendered to Afghan authorities.

== History ==
The attacks of 11 September 2001, triggered Article 5 of the NATO treaty, stating that an attack against any member would be regarded as a direct attack on all parties. Although France was not bound by this clause, it pledged armed forces at the side of its allies.

=== Legal context and UN mandate ===
On 20 December 2001, Resolution 1386 of the United Nations Security Council created the International Security Assistance Force (ISAF), under Chapter VII of the United Nations Charter. Its mandate is

to allow it, as resources permit, to support the Afghan Transitional Authority and its successors in the maintenance of security in areas of Afghanistan outside of Kabul and its environs, so that the Afghan Authorities as well as the personnel of the United Nations and other international civilian personnel engaged, in particular, in reconstruction and humanitarian efforts, can operate in a secure environment, and to provide security assistance for the performance of other tasks in support of the Bonn Agreement

— United Nations Security Council Resolution 1510.

=== Opération Héraklès ===
From 21 October 2001, Opération Héraklès came in force, with the deployment of twenty Mirage IVP and twenty C-135FR at the air base of Al Dhafra. These planes carried out 800 one-hour reconnaissance missions over Afghanistan, after crossing the Sea of Oman and part of Pakistan, until they were drawn back to France on in February 2002.

On 21 November 2001, the aircraft carrier Charles de Gaulle and her battle group were deployed in the Indian Ocean to support NATO operations in Afghanistan. Dubbed Task Force 473, the group comprise the Charles De Gaulle, the frigates La Motte-Picquet, Jean de Vienne and Jean Bart, the tanker Meuse, the nuclear submarine Rubis, and aviso Commandant Ducuing. On 19 December 2001, Dassault-Breguet Super Étendards aircraft carried out their first missions.

On 27 December 2001, Task Force 473 was integrated into a multinational force also comprising the aero-naval groups of USS Theodore Roosevelt and USS John C. Stennis, and the Italian Giuseppe Garibaldi, amounting to over 100 ships in total.

On 18 February 2002, a Helios 2A satellite spotted suspicious activities on the ground near Gardēz. After confirmation by two Super Étendards and by US special forces, Operation Anaconda was launched by US and British forces. The attempted capture of wanted leaders ended in failure as the incomplete surrounding allowed them to flee.

In March 2002, a rescue unit was created under the name of RESAL (équipe de Recherche Et Secours AéroLarguée) to help pilots should they be downed over Afghanistan. In March, eight Super Étendards and six Mirage 2000 targeted several suspected Al Qaida targets on request from US forces. US President George Bush stated

There are many examples of commitment from our good ally, France, who has deployed nearly one-fourth of its army and navy to support Operation Enduring Freedom.

From February, Charles De Gaulle and John C. Stennis exchanged aircraft in joint exercises.

=== Land deployment ===
On 15 November 2001, the first French soldiers of the 21st RIMA landed in Afghanistan, Mazar-E-Sharif and North of Kabul. They amounted to 640 men, of whom 400 were deployed under the aegis in the ISAF.

On 11 August 2003, NATO took over command of the 3500-strong ISAF. By that time, the French contingent amounted to 500 men, one seventh of the force. France also assumed command of the Kabul region.

=== Special forces activities: Opération Épidote ===
In May 2003, during the G8 summit in Evian, President Chirac ordered Special Forces be sent to Southern Afghanistan. 200 men of the Commandement des opérations spéciales operated on the ground from July 2003 to December 2006 near Spin Boldak, and later at Jalalabad. They sustained 7 killed.

The year 2003 marked the beginning of Opération Épidote, which aimed at training elements of the Afghan Army. The mission lasted three years, during which 3,810 soldiers were trained.

From 9 August 2004 to 11 February 2005, the Eurocorps was put in charge for the ISAF6 mission.

In February 2010, one Operational Mentoring and Liaison Team (OMLT), composed of 70 French soldiers and a number of Afghan troops participated in the NATO-led Operation Moshtarak in Helmand Province, Southern Afghanistan.

=== First casualties ===
French Forces sustained their first fatality on 31 August 2004 when corporal Murat Yagci, of the 1er RPIMa, gravely injured two days earlier when his vehicle fell over a cliff, died of his wounds. Two more soldiers, of the 3e RH, were killed in a traffic accident near Kabul on 21 October. On 12 February 2005, a corporal of the 2e REI killed himself with his own weapon.

The first combat fatalities occurred on 17 September 2005, when a makeshift landmine killed Corporal Cédric Crupel, of the 1er RPIMa, near Spin Boldak.

=== Reinforcements of the expeditionary corps and the Surobi Ambush ===
By December 2008, the French contingent in Afghanistan had grown to 1,600 men, with 4000 more involved in the theatre of operations. The Air component had carried out 1 700 sorties and 300 shows of force.

In August 2008, nine French soldiers were killed and 21 wounded by guerilla forces in the Uzbin Valley Ambush, near Surobi. A tenth soldier died in a related road accident. These losses, the heaviest in France since the 1983 Beirut barracks bombing, shocked the public opinion and prompted or accelerated deployment of items requested by the military, particularly drones and tele-operated turrets for VABs.

On 22 September 2008, a 343 to 210 vote by the National Assembly of France authorised prolonged intervention in Afghanistan. In March 2009, the French set on the offensive in Kapisa Province, yielding the Battle of Alasay; at the price of one killed, they routed a few hundreds of guerrilla and established two outposts for the Afghan Army.

On 4 September 2009, Corporal Johan Naguin, of the 3e RIMa, was killed by a makeshift landmine; Chief corporal Thomas Rousselle, of the 3e RIMa, died of his wounds two days later, and eight others were wounded. On 27 September, a storm killed three soldiers. A first was struck by lightning; as others rushed to evacuate him, one was swept away by a flood, and a second drowned as he tried to rescue his comrade. The same day, a fourth soldier died in a road accident, once again as he was riding in the open turret of a VAB. On 4 October, two soldiers died in an explosion triggered against their convoy; a third, chief sergeant Johann Hivin-Gerard, of the 3e RIMa, succumbed to his wounds four days later.

On 31 October 2009, French general Marcel Druart transferred command of the region of Kabul to Turkish general Levent Çolak. The next day, French forces in Afghanistan were organised under the Aegis of the Brigade La Fayette.

== Order of battle ==
The total French forces deployed on the theatre of operations, including Afghanistan, Tajikistan, Kyrgyzstan and the Indian Ocean, amounts to 30,000 men. 23,200 have served in Afghanistan itself. Furthermore, 150 gendarmes are training the Afghan police.

=== Army ===
The French Army has deployed two joint battalions, each comprising three combat companies, and six "Operational Mentoring Liaison Team". They fall mostly under Regional Command Capital, under Turkish command since 2009, and under Regional Command East, under US command.

Since 1 November 2009, the French deployment has been deeply reorganised, though complements are supposedly unchanged:

- geographically, most of the French units were transferred to Kapisa and Surobi, joining them in a neighbourhood where they can support each other. The headquarters is in an outpost near Nijrab.
- operationally, responsibility for Surobi district has been transferred from Regional Command Capital to Regional Command East, bringing GTIA Surobi and GTIA Kapisa under a single Regional command. Furthermore, a "Brigade La Fayette", under US command, was created to regroup both GTIA into a single hierarchy.

Hence, the two French battalions are now grouped both geographically and operationally, under the aegis of the Brigade La Fayette.

The GTIA have both been reinforced by one additional infantry company, bringing the effectives to around 3000 men as of 1 November 2009. They have now the same complement; each can deploy an AMX-10 RC platoon, and several fire support platoons comprising VBL and 20mm-armed VAB T20-13 vehicles.

Summer of 2009 saw a significant beefing up in aerial capabilities, with 3 EC-665 Tigre and 2 AS-532 Cougar of the ALAT sent in reinforcements. They add to the 6 helicopters already deployed.

Eight 155mm CAESAR self-propelled howitzers have been sent to Afghanistan. Two are deployed in each outpost held by the French, and the remaining four are kept in Kabul as a reserve. The howitzers deployed in the field can provide fire support to French troops as they operate in neighbouring valleys, complementing the 120mm MO-120-RT-61 mortars that they bring with.

Six "Operational Mentoring and Liaison Teams" amounting to 300 men assist the Afghan Army:

- Five teams with the Afghan 201st Army Corps in Kapisa and Surobi, amounting to 230 men:
  - 1 team with the headquarters of the Army Corps and of its 1st Brigade
  - 2 teams with an infantry kandak within the 1st Brigade
  - 1 team with a support kandak of the 1st Brigade
  - 1 team with a logistic kandak of the 1st Brigade
- One 70-man team with the 41st kandak of the 4th Brigade in the Afghan 205th Army Corps. This team, deployed on Tarin Kwot and Deh Rawod outposts, is organically attached to the Neerland contingent, in Regional Command South. The troops come from the 2e REI.

Opération Épidote employs 60 men who train Afghan officers. In the year 2009, 5000 Afghan officers were taught there.

About 20 instructors train 6 commando kandaks. At least two kandaks have been formed thus far.

=== Air Force ===
As of April 2009, the French Air Force had 334 men in Afghanistan. They manned the following systems:

- 6 attack planes, based in Kandahar
  - 3 Mirage 2000D, since 2005
  - 3 Mirage F1 CR, since 20 May 2009. They relieved twenty-three Rafale that were present from 2007.
- 3 Caracal in Kabul Airport, under the aegis of the ALAT, attached to the Army, 3 Tigers, 3 Gazelles Viviane HOT, and 2 Cougars.
- 2 Harfang drones, since 3 February 2009; three were originally deployed, but one was damaged in a crash and brought back to France.

In the same theatre of operation but outside Afghanistan, 172 men are deployed in Dushanbe, in Tajikistan, manning a logistic base and two C-160 Transall. Furthermore, a C135 is based at the Transit Centre at Manas, in Kirghizistan, with 35 men.

=== Gendarmerie ===
150 French gendarmes take part in the 500-man European Gendarmerie Force contingent in Afghanistan.

Two Mobile Gendarmerie squadrons, from Chauny and Satory, are scheduled to deploy for six months from early 2010 to train the Afghan police.

=== Military Fuel Service ===
The Military Fuel Service has been in charge of fuel supplies in Kabul Airport and in Camp Warehouse since 2006

== Notes and references ==
=== Bibliography ===
- Frédéric Lert, Pilotes en Afghanistan, Altipress, 2009, ISBN 2-911218-75-2
- Jean-Dominique Merchet, Mourir pour l'Afghanistan, Jacob-Duvernet, 2008, ISBN 978-2-84724-219-5
