= Coalition combat operations in Afghanistan in 2009 =

In 2009, the United States and NATO International Security Assistance Force (ISAF) coalition, along with Afghan National Army forces, continued military operations against the Taliban in Afghanistan. 2009 marks the eighth year of the War in Afghanistan, which began late in 2001.

== United States ==
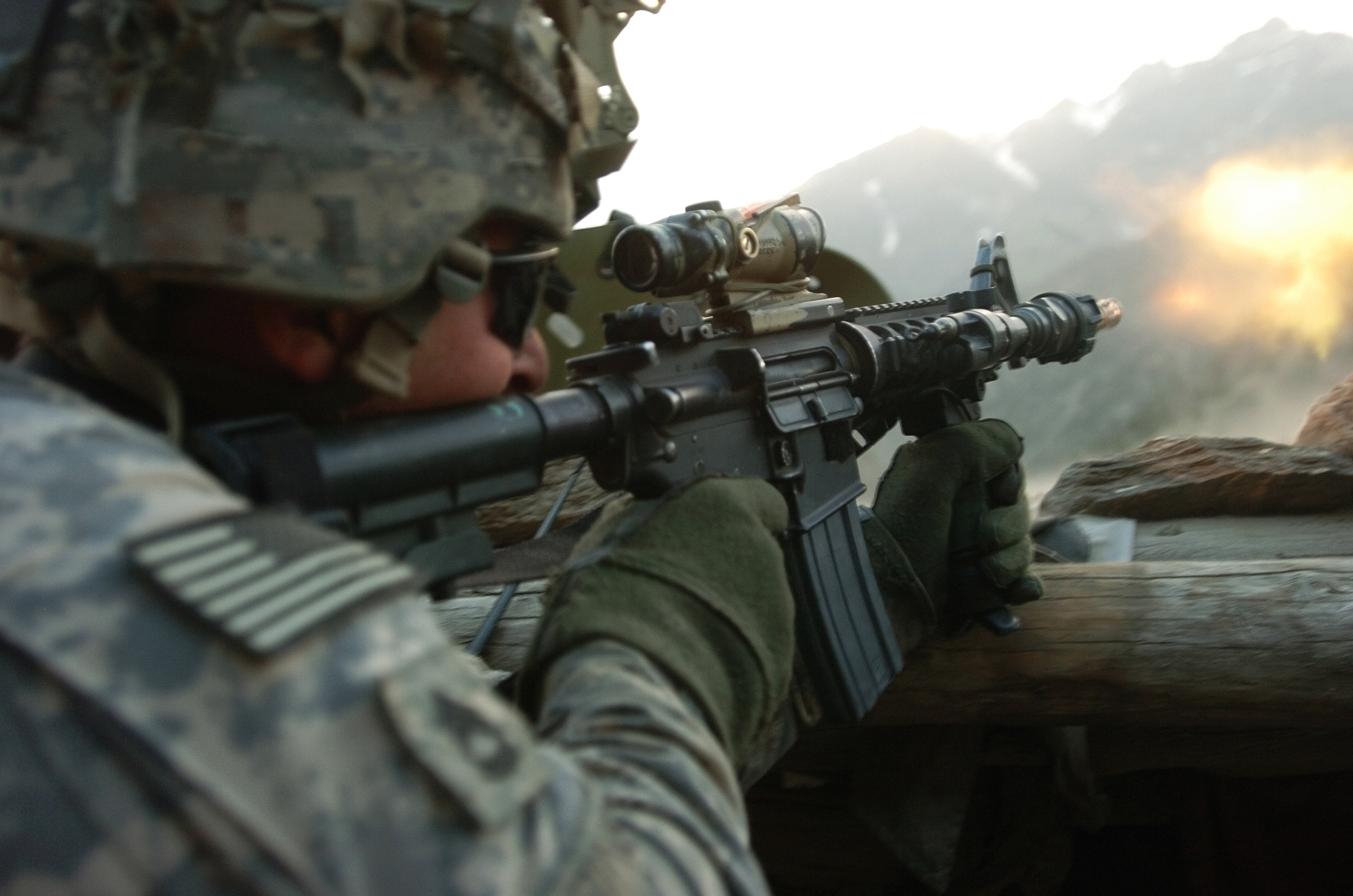
A U.S. Army soldier with 1st Battalion, 32nd Infantry Regiment, 10th Mountain Division, fires his weapon during a battle with insurgent forces in Barge Matal, during Operation Mountain Fire on July 12, 2009.

- Combined Joint Special Operations Task Force-Afghanistan

This task force rotates between the 3rd and 7th Special Forces Groups. The 7th Group, commanded by Col. Sean Mulholland, replaced the 3rd Group in late July 2009. The task force is partnered with six Afghan commando units.

However, other U.S. special operation forces also have deployed to Afghanistan. Units that have deployed in the past have included elements of the 75th Ranger Regiment, Navy SEALs, units from the 160th Special Operations Aviation Regiment, squadrons from the Army's covert 1st Special Forces Operational Detachment—Delta, commonly known as Delta Force, air commandos from the Air Force Special Operations Command and Marines from the Marine Special Operations Command. CIA paramilitary teams also have served in Afghanistan.

Special operations units from coalition countries have also served in Afghanistan, including members of the British Special Air Service (SAS) and Special Boat Service (SBS), troopers from the Australian Special Air Service Regiment (SASR), Germany's KSK (Kommando Spezialkraefte), and soldiers from Canada's Joint Task Force Two (JTF2). In 2005, and again in 2009, elements of the New Zealand Special Air Service was deployed to Afghanistan. Soldiers from Sweden's Särskilda Skyddsgruppen (Special Protection Group) have served in Afghanistan and two SSG troopers were killed by a roadside bomb in late 2005. Norwegian Special Forces units also have deployed to Afghanistan.

- 173rd Airborne Brigade Combat Team (Colonel James Johnson)

The 173rd relieved the 3rd BCT, 10th Mountain Division in December 2009. It is responsible for Wardak and Logar provinces as part of Regional Command East. The brigade has combat experience in Afghanistan from two previous deployments and includes the following units:

  - Headquarters and Headquarters Company (HHC)
  - 1st Battalion, 503rd Infantry Regiment
  - 2nd Battalion, 503rd Infantry Regiment
  - 1st Squadron, 91st Cavalry Regiment
  - 173rd Special Troops Battalion (173rd STB)
  - 173rd Support Battalion
- 4th Brigade Combat Team, (4th BCT) 4th Infantry Division (Colonel Randy George)

The 4th BCT, known as Task Force Mountain Warrior, is responsible for Nangarhar, Nuristan, Konar and Laghman provinces in eastern Afghanistan. It relieved the 3rd Brigade Combat Team, 1st Infantry Division, or Task Force Duke, which had been conducting operations in the area for the past 15 months. The 4th BCT includes the following units:

  - 1st Battalion 12th Infantry Regiment (Currently under the operational control, or OPCON, of Task Force Kandahar)
  - 2nd Battalion 12th Infantry Regiment
  - 3rd Squadron 61st Cavalry Regiment
  - 2nd Battalion 77th Field Artillery Regiment (2-77th FAR)
  - 704th Brigade Support Battalion (704th BSB)
  - 4th Brigade Special Troops Battalion (4th BSTB)
- 5th Stryker Brigade Combat Team, 2nd Infantry Division (Colonel Harry Tunnell)

Based at Fort Lewis, Washington, the 5th SBCT deployed approximately 4,000 soldiers to Afghanistan in mid-summer 2009. Part of the brigade is deployed to Zabul province as part of Task Force Zabul. This is the first rotation to Afghanistan for one of the U.S. Army's new Stryker brigades and includes the following units:

  - 1st Battalion, 17th Infantry Regiment
  - 2nd Battalion, 1st Infantry Regiment
  - 4th Battalion, 23rd Infantry Regiment—Forward Operating Base Wolverine, Zabul province
  - 3rd Battalion, 17th Field Artillery Regiment (3-17th FAR)
  - 8th Squadron, 1st Cavalry Regiment
  - 402nd Brigade Support Battalion (402nd BSB)
  - 572nd Military Intelligence Company (572nd MIC)
  - 562nd Engineer Company
  - Company A, 52nd Infantry Regiment
  - 21st Signal Company
  - Headquarters and Headquarters Company (HHC), 5th SBCT
- 4th Brigade Combat Team, 25th Infantry Division (Colonel Michael L. Howard)

Based at Fort Richardson in Alaska, the 4th BCT relieved the 4th BCT of the 101st Airborne Division in March 2009. The brigade is responsible for Paktya, Paktika and Khost provinces. Known as Task Force Yukon, the 4th BCT includes the following units:

  - Headquarters and Headquarters Company (HHC), 4th BCT
  - 1st Battalion, 501st Infantry Regiment
  - 3rd Battalion, 509th Infantry Regiment
  - 1st Squadron, 40th Cavalry Regiment
  - 2nd Battalion, 377th Field Artillery Regiment (2-377th FAR)
  - 425th Brigade Special Troops Battalion (425th BSTB)
  - 725th Brigade Support Battalion (725th BSB)
  - B Company, 2nd Battalion, 151st Infantry Regiment
- 4th Brigade Combat Team, 82nd Airborne Division (Colonel Brian M. Drinkwine)

About 3,300 paratroopers from the 4th BCT deployed to western and southern Afghanistan in August 2009. Based at Fort Bragg, North Carolina, the 4th BCT includes the following units:

  - 1st Battalion, 508th Parachute Infantry Regiment (1-508th PIR) - (Lieutenant Colonel David Oclander)
  - 2nd Battalion, 508th Parachute Infantry Regiment (2-508th PIR) - (Lieutenant Colonel Frank Jenio)
  - 4th Squadron, 73rd Cavalry Regiment - (Lieutenant Colonel Michael Wawrzyniak)
  - 2nd Battalion, 321st Airborne Field Artillery Regiment (2-321st AFAR) - (Lieutenant Colonel William Huff)
  - 782nd Brigade Support Battalion (782nd BSB) - (Lieutenant Colonel Patrick Picardo)
  - 508th Special Troops Battalion (508th STB)
- Marine Expeditionary Brigade-Afghanistan/'Task Force Leatherneck' (Brigadier General Larry Nicholson)

MEB-Afghanistan absorbed the former Special Purpose Marine Air Ground Task Force-Afghanistan in southern Afghanistan on May 29, 2009, reflecting the Marine Corps portion of the increased U.S. troop commitment to Afghanistan. Headquartered by the 2nd Marine Expeditionary Brigade, MEB-Afghanistan includes the following units:

- Regimental Combat Team 7 (RCT 7) (Colonel Randall P. Newman)
  - 1st Battalion, 3rd Marine Regiment
  - 2nd Battalion, 2nd Marine Regiment
  - 3rd Battalion, 4th Marine Regiment
  - 3rd Battalion, 10th Marine Regiment
  - Marine Aircraft Group 40 (MAG 40) (Colonel Kevin S. Vest)
    - Marine Heavy Helicopter Squadron 362 (MHHS 362)
    - Marine Heavy Helicopter Squadron 772 (MHHS 772)
    - Marine Light Attack Helicopter Squadron 169 (MLAHS 169)
    - Marine Attack Squadron 214 (MAS 214)
    - Marine Aerial Refueler Transport Squadron 352 (MARTS 352)
    - Marine Unmanned Aerial Vehicle Squadron 2 (MUAVS 2)
    - Marine Wing Support Squadron 371 (MWSS 371)
  - Combat Logistics Regiment 2 (CLR 2) (Colonel John W. Simmons)
    - Combat Logistics Battalion 8 (CLB 8)
    - 8th Engineer Support Battalion (8th ESB)
  - 2nd Light Armored Reconnaissance Battalion (2nd LARB)
  - 2nd Combat Engineer Battalion (2nd CEB)
  - 2nd MEB Headquarters Group
- Headquarters, 82nd Airborne Division (Major General Curtis Scaparrotti)

The headquarters of the 82nd Airborne Division relieved the 101st Airborne Division's headquarters on June 3, 2009. Consisting of roughly 1,000 soldiers the 101st's headquarters officially became Combined Joint Task Force 82 and now commands NATO's Regional Command East sector in Afghanistan.

- 45th Sustainment Brigade (Colonel Clay B. Hatcher)

The 45th, based in Schofield Barracks, Hawaii, relieved the 101st Sustainment Brigade on February 9, 2009. The brigade is responsible for the Joint Logistics Command and is augmented by an Army Reserve unit and a unit from the Maine Army National Guard.

  - Headquarters and Headquarters Company (HHC)
  - 45th Special Troops Battalion (45th STB)
  - 524th Combat Service Support Battalion (524th CSSB)
  - 286th Combat Sustainment Support Battalion (286th CSSB), Army Reserve
  - 484th Movement Control Battalion (484th MCB), Maine Army National Guard
- 100th Brigade Support Battalion (100th BSB) - ( Lieutenant Colonel Brent B. Bush)

The Ft. Sill, Oklahoma based unit was the first unit redeployed from Iraq to Afghanistan in March 2009. The unit was operating in Iraq from November 2008 until receiving redeployment orders to Afghanistan in March 2009. The 100th BSB was brought in to establish the CSSB Headquarters that would support the Marines throughout Helmand Province and was a subordinate unit to the 45th Sustainment Brigade. The 100th BSB provided logistical oversight to include transportation, contracting, bulk fuel, bottled water and DFAC support to FOB Leatherneck.

- 82nd Combat Aviation Brigade (82nd CAB), 82nd Airborne Division (Colonel Paul Bricker)

The 82nd Combat Aviation Brigade (82nd CAB) deployed approximately 2,800 soldiers to Afghanistan in the spring of 2009. The deployment is part of the buildup of combat forces in Afghanistan and the brigade relieved the 159th Combat Aviation Brigade of the 101st Airborne Division. Known as Task Force Pegasus, the brigade is based at Kandahar Airfield in southern Afghanistan. The 82nd CAB includes the following units:

  - Headquarters and Headquarters Company (HHC)
  - 1st Battalion, 82nd Aviation Regiment (Attack Reconnaissance) (1st Attack Reconnaissance Battalion 82nd Aviation Regiment), flying AH-64D Apache Longbow helicopters
  - 2nd Battalion, 82nd Aviation Regiment (Assault) (2nd Assault Battalion 82nd Aviation Regiment), flying UH-60L Black Hawk helicopters
  - 3rd Battalion, 82nd Aviation Regiment (General Support) (3rd General Support Battalion 82nd Aviation Regiment), flying CH-47F Chinook helicopters
  - 1st Squadron, 17th Cavalry Regiment (Attack Reconnaissance) (1st Attack Reconnaissance Squadron 17th Cavalry Regiment) flying OH-58D Kiowa Warrior helicopters
  - 122nd Aviation Support Battalion (122nd ASB)
- 33rd Brigade Combat Team (33rd BCT), Illinois Army National Guard (Colonel Scott Thoele)

The 33rd BCT is currently the headquarters of Task Force Phoenix, which is in charge of training the Afghan National Army. The 33rd deployed in the winter of 2008, relieving the 27th BCT of the New York Army National Guard. The brigade includes 1,600 soldiers from Illinois augmented by volunteers from Arkansas, Guam, Georgia and Oregon and soldiers from the Inactive Ready Reserve. The 33rd BCT includes the following units:

  - 2nd Squadron, 106th Cavalry Regiment
  - 1st Battalion, 178th Infantry Regiment
  - 2nd Battalion, 130th Infantry Regiment
  - 33rd Special Troops Battalion (33rd STB)
  - 634th Brigade Support Battalion (634th BSB)
  - 2nd Battalion, 122nd Field Artillery Regiment (2-122nd FAR)
  - 3rd Battalion, 103rd Armor Regiment, Pennsylvania Army National Guard
- 48th Infantry Brigade Combat Team (48th IBCT), Georgia Army National Guard (Colonel Lee Durham)

The 48th Infantry BCT deployed to continue training the Afghan National Security Forces. The 48th IBCT includes the following units:

  - Headquarters and Headquarters Company (HHC)
  - 48th Brigade Special Troops Battalion (48th BSTB)
  - 1st Squadron, 108th Cavalry Regiment
  - 1st Battalion, 121st Infantry Regiment
  - 2nd Battalion, 121st Infantry Regiment
  - 1st Battalion, 118th Field Artillery Regiment (1-118th FAR)
  - 148th Brigade Support Battalion (148th BSB)
