= Groupement tactique interarmes de Surobi =

The Groupement tactique interarmes de Surobi (GTIA Surobi, "joint tactical group of Surobi"), also called Task Force Dragon, is a battalion-sized unit of the French Army, based in Surobi District, in Afghanistan. It operates in the framework of the French forces in Afghanistan.

== Organisation ==
GTIA Surobi comprises

- a command component
- a support component (engineers, artillery, cavalry)
- 3 armoured infantry sub-groups

From September 2010, the name "task force" is given up, and replaced by the name "battle-group".

The support unit provides fire support, engineering, communications, maintenance and medical support.

On 1 November 2009, command of the GTIA was transferred to the Brigade La Fayette.

== See also ==
- Groupement tactique interarmes de Kapisa
- Uzbin Valley ambush
- Operation Septentrion
