= Operation Septentrion =

NATO military operation

- Part of the War in Afghanistan
Date	December 16–18, 2009
Location	Uzbin Valley, Afghanistan

Belligerents
International Security Assistance Force	Taliban

Commanders and leaders
Lieutenant-Colonel Hervé Wallerand	Unknown

Units involved
• French Army • United States Special Forces • Afghan National Army (ANA)	

Strength
• 750–800 (French Army) • 200 (United States Special Forces) • (Afghan National Army)	Unknown

Operation Septentrion was a 36-hour military operation of the International Security Assistance Force (ISAF), a NATO-led security mission, that took place December 16–18, 2009, in the Uzbin Valley of eastern Afghanistan.

A part of the War in Afghanistan, it involved a force of 1,100 troops, including 750 to 800 French troops, 200 United States Special Forces and Afghan National Army (ANA) soldiers.

== Background ==
Sixteen months before the operation, the Uzbin Valley ambush, on August 18, 2008, by the Taliban in the area of Surobi, Afghanistan, had killed ten French soldiers and wounded twenty-one.

== Goals ==
The operation's purpose was "reaffirming the sovereignty of Afghan security forces in the north of the Uzbeen [sic] Valley", according to a French military spokesperson, as well as to plant the Afghan flag in what was called a key strategic village. (While 75 percent of the Uzbin Valley had been under ISAF control, the rest of the valley had been under the control of the Taliban.)

== Fighting ==
During more than 90 minutes of combat, several US soldiers were wounded, including three serious injuries. The Taliban fighters attacked with rocket-propelled grenades, mortars and heavy machine gun fire; for the coalition forces, the French troops used shells, backed up by French Tigre and US Apache helicopters and fighter jets. At least one Taliban fighter was killed and three were injured, according to Lieutenant-Colonel Hervé Wallerand, who led the operation.

== Strategy ==
The French employed what was called the "Mikado strategy" (la stratégie du Mikado), after the game Mikado (known in North America as "pick-up sticks"), because of the need to plan every move carefully with constant awareness that one wrong step could risk everything being lost. In particular, the Mikado strategy emphasizes consulting with local inhabitants in a shura (or consultation) to minimize the risk of local civilians conspiring against the ANA and ISAF forces. For this reason the operation was preceded by "weeks of negotiations with local villagers", according to the BBC News.

== Aftermath ==
In July 2011, the Croix de la Valeur Militaire ("cross of military valour"), a French military decoration, was presented to five Americans – Cpt. Thomas Harper, Master Sgt. David Nuemer, Sgt. 1st Class Ryan Ahern, Staff Sgt. Casey Roberts and Sgt. Ryan Meister – for their service during the operation.

== See also ==
- 2009 in Afghanistan
- Coalition combat operations in Afghanistan in 2009
- Groupement tactique interarmes de Surobi
