= Combat Logistics Battalion 6 =

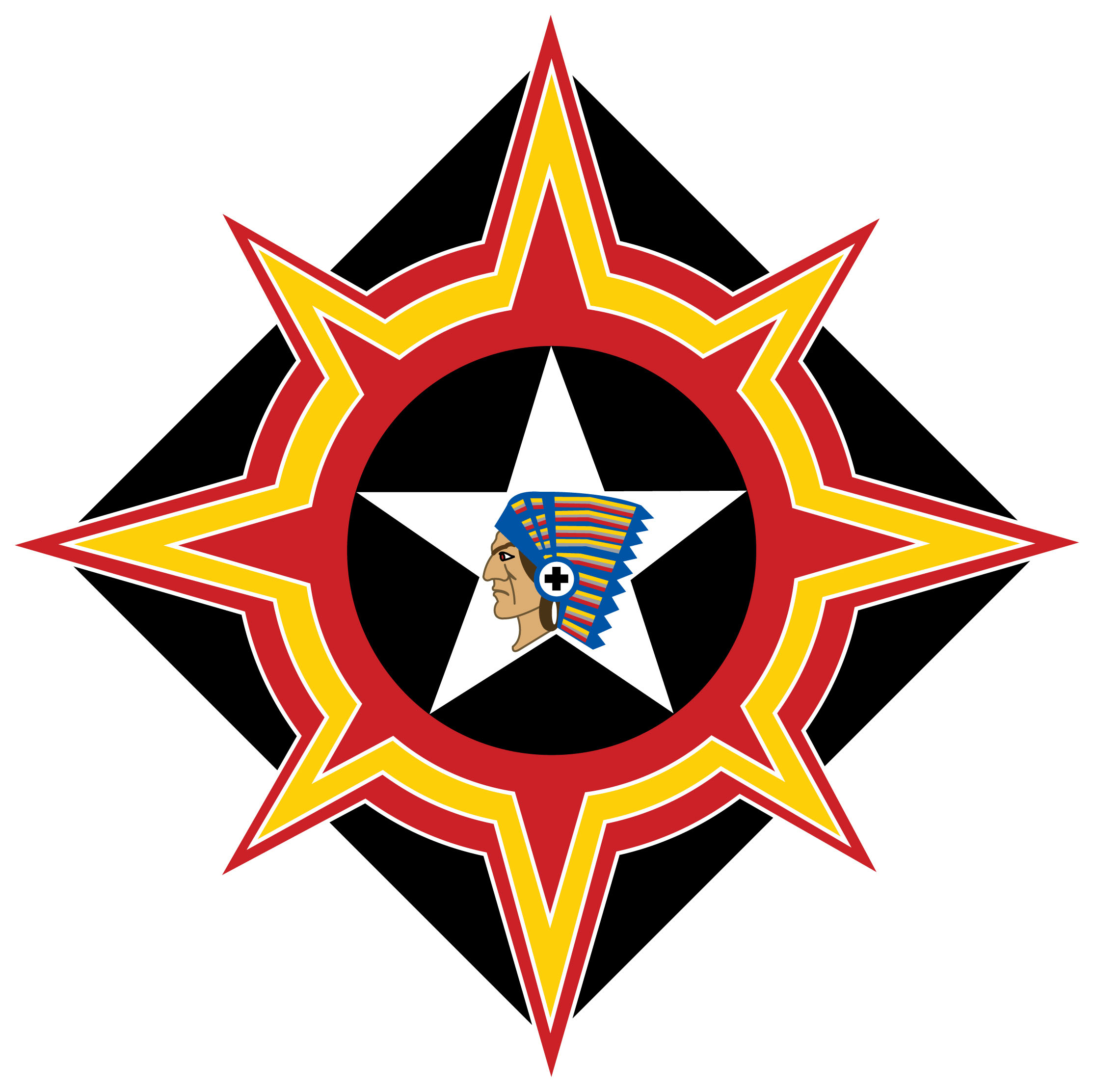
- CLB-6's insignia
- Country: United States
- Allegiance: United States of America
- Branch: United States Marine Corps
- Type: Logistics
- Part of: Combat Logistics Regiment 2; 2nd Marine Logistics Group
- Garrison/HQ: Marine Corps Base Camp Lejeune
- Nickname: Red Cloud
- Motto: Fortius quo Fidelius (Strength through Loyalty)
- Engagements: War on terror: War in Afghanistan; Iraq War; Operation Juniper Shield

Commanders
- Current commander: LtCol Emmaline Hill

Combat Logistics Battalion 6 (CLB-6) is a logistics battalion of the United States Marine Corps. Nicknamed "Red Cloud," the unit is based at Marine Corps Base Camp Lejeune, North Carolina and fall under the command of Combat Logistics Regiment 2 and the 2nd Marine Logistics Group.

== Current Mission ==
CLB-6 will train, rapidly task organize, deploy, employ, fight and redeploy in order to provide combat service support to a Regimental Combat Team (RCT) and additional Marine Air Ground Task Force (MAGTF) maneuver elements in the RCT's battle space, beyond their organic capabilities, in order to enable continuity of operations. Be prepared to (BPT) assume the duties of a Logistics Combat Element (LCE).

== Subordinate Units ==
CLB-6 Currently contains two companies with which to accomplish the Battalion Mission. Headquarters and Service Company contains the battalion headquarters element (Commanding Officer, Executive Officer, and Sergeant Major) as well as the Commanding Officer's staff sections. Motor Transport Company performs the main function of CLB-6 by providing transportation services using various tactical vehicles.

According to the mission of the battalion: "The battalion will task organize, adding an additional company of Combat Engineers or a Combat Logistics Company to provide for all functions of logistics as needed."

== History ==
Combat Logistics Battalion 6 formed in 2006 under the direction of Commanding Officer Lieutenant Colonel Patrick N. Kelleher and Sergeant Major Melanie A. Hunt. The battalion rapidly took shape in order to deploy during the period of a surge of U.S. forces for Operation Iraqi Freedom (06-08). The need for air and ground logistical support in forward deployed regions of the world led to the battalion's creation.

Following Mojave Viper training at the Marine Air Ground Combat Training Center, Twentynine Palms, California, the battalion deployed to Al Anbar Province in western Iraq in February 2007. After a transfer of authority with Combat Logistics Battalion 8, CLB-6 returned in September 2007.

Following a deployment training workup up, CLB-6 again deployed in February 2008 to Al Anbar Province in western Iraq in support of (OIF) under the direction of Commanding Officer Lieutenant Colonel David J. Eskelund and Sergeant Major Wayne O. Gallman. They were in general support of the I Marine Expeditionary Force throughout the province. They returned from the deployment in September 2008.

Lieutenant Colonel Michael D. Lepson took command in June 2009 and, along with Sergeant Major Alex M. Dobson, led the battalion in the prelude and through its upcoming deployment. In January 2010, CLB-6 deployed to Afghanistan in support of Operation Enduring Freedom. They were based out of Camp Leatherneck and had a presence throughout the Helmand Province.

Following the unscheduled relief of LtCol Lepson due to incriminating command climate surveys, Major William C. Stophel took command in July and led the battalion in its return to the U.S. in August 2010. First Sergeant Raquel Painter filled the role as Sergeant Major, CLB -6 after the unexpected relief of the previous Sergeant Major. Extensive ground combat logistics patrols were conducted throughout the deployment, pushing supplies from Camp Leatherneck to Now Zad, Musa Qal'eh and Sangin. In particular, CLB-6 supported a series of joint CLPs with the British Army's 10th Close Support Logistics Regiment. CLB -6 played a key role in the Female Engagement Team support throughout the MEB footprint.

Lieutenant Colonel R. J. Rizzo held command of CLB-6 from September 2010, and in July 2011, CLB-6 deployed to Afghanistan in support of OEF. They were based out of Camp Leatherneck and had a presence throughout the Helmand Province similar to its prior deployment. CLB-6 completed its deployment and returned in February 2012.

Lieutenant Colonel Brian W. Mullery took charge in June 2012 and Sergeant Major Roger Griffith joined the battalion in April 2012, leading the battalion into its third deployment in support of Operation Enduring Freedom. The battalion returned to the United States in February 2014 after having provided combat service support to Regional Command (South West).

As operations in Iraq and Afghanistan began to draw down, CLB-6 deployed as the LCE in support of the Special Purpose MAGTF Crisis Response AFRICOM (SPMAGTF-CR-AF) three times from 2015 to 2020.

In March 2016, Marine Corps Times reported that the battalion deployed to west Africa as part of Operation Juniper Shield, conducting a five-week mission in Mauritania where they trained their Mauritanian Army counterparts in convoy operations.

== Gallery ==
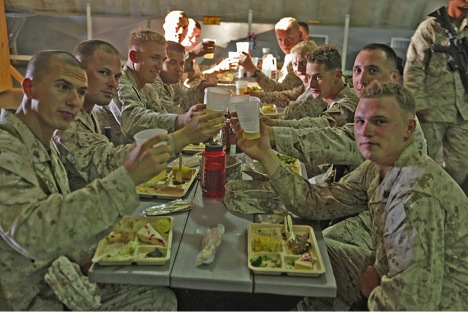
Marines of Combat Logistics Battalion 6, 2nd Marine Logistics Group, based out of Camp Lejeune, N.C., toast in celebration of their completion of the Integrated Training Exercise during their "Warrior Night" at Twentynine Palms, Calif., 6 June 2013.

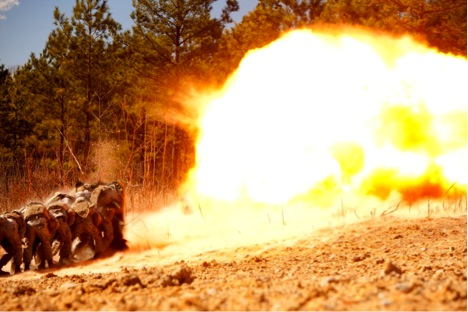
Marines from Engineering Company train in urban breaching techniques during Combat Logistics Battalion 6's field exercise at Fort Pickett Virginia, 20 March 2013.

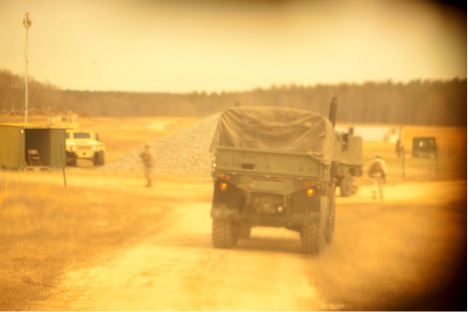
A convoy from Transportation Support Company moves supplies and personnel during Combat Logistic Battalion 6's field exercise at Fort Pickett, Va., 21 March 2013.

== Fallen Marines ==
3-22-2007 - U.S. Marine Corps Cpl. Henry W. Bogrette, 21-year-old native of Richville, N.Y., died of hostile fire near Camp Fallujah in Al Anbar, Iraq.

7-22-2007 - U.S. Marine Corps Lance Cpl. Bobby L. Twitty, 20-year-old native of Bedias, Texas, died from a vehicle accident in Ramadi, Iraq.

5-14-2007 - U.S. Marine Corps Lance Cpl. Jeffrey D. Walker, 21-year-old native of Macon, Georgia, died from hostile fire in Fallujah, Iraq.

== In popular culture ==
2014 - A nonfiction memoir titled "The Lieutenant Don't Know" details the experiences of 2nd Platoon, Alpha Company (as Transportation Company was known then) during the 2010 deployment to Afghanistan. The book was written by the platoon commander. It is one of relatively few books covering combat logistics in Afghanistan (compared to the number of books covering other types of combat operations). The Marine Corps Times called the book "a rare look into the world of the Marines whose job it was to ferry supplies to the fighting forces in Afghanistan by way of vehicle convoys".

2023 - A gothic horror novel titled "The Militia House" tells a fictionalized version of CLB-6's 2010 deployment. It was written by one of the landing support Marines on the deployment. The book was nominated for the 2023 Shirley Jackson Award, one of the premier awards for horror writing.

== See also ==
- List of United States Marine Corps battalions
- Organization of the United States Marine Corps
