= Véronique de Viguerie =

French photojournalist

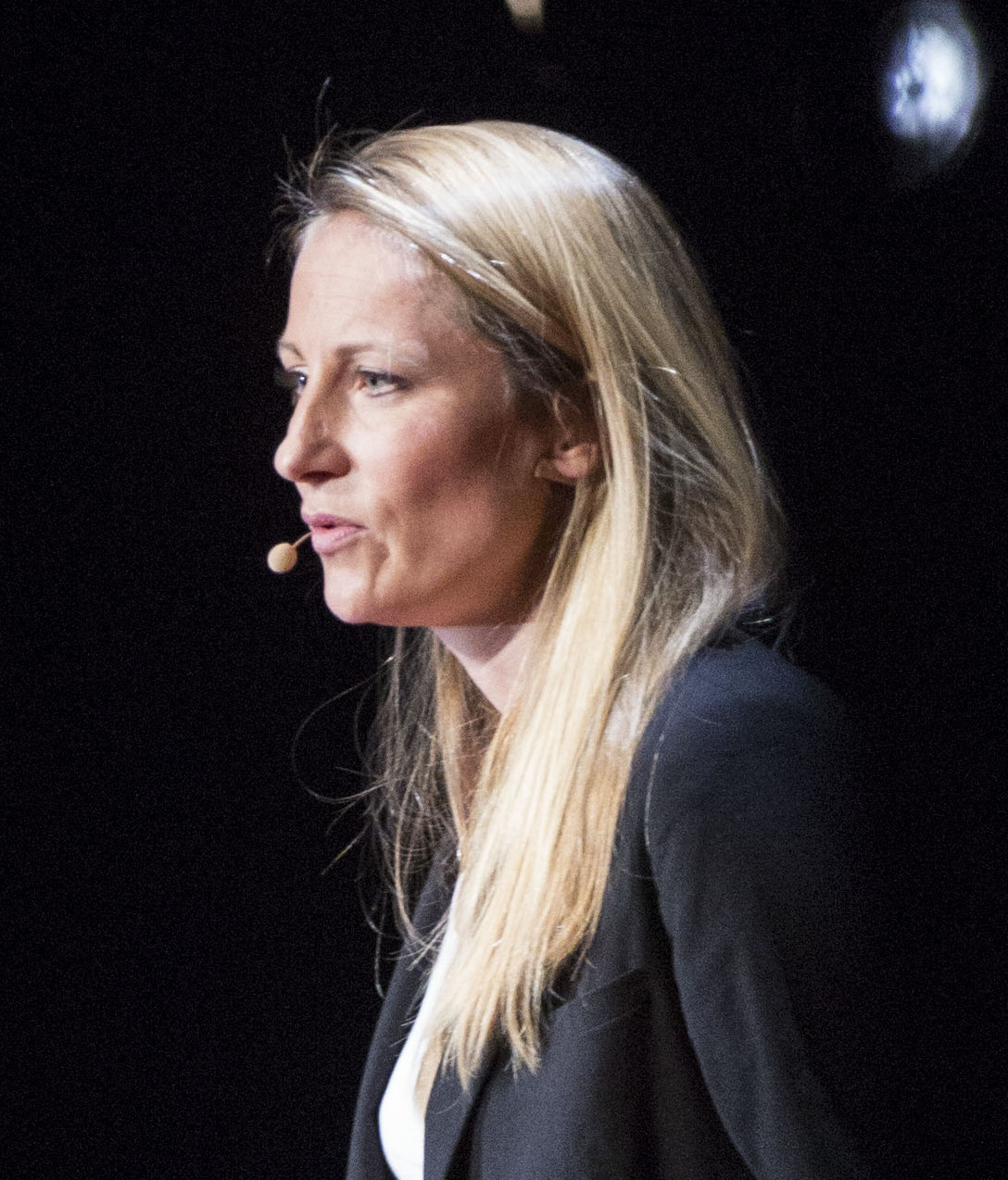
Véronique de Viguerie

Véronique de Viguerie (born in 1978) is a French photojournalist. She was noted for covering a story about an Afghan guerrilla group responsible for the Uzbin Valley ambush.

== Biography ==
Viguerie was born in 1978 in Toulouse. After obtaining a master's degree in Law in Paris, she turned to photography, undertaking studies in Great Britain. In 2002, she worked in the UK at the Lincolnshire Echo. In 2004, she went to Afghanistan working as a freelance photographer. She nearly died in a suicide attack on a cyber cafe in Kabul in May 2005. She lived in Kabul for 3 years, then began reporting from many countries, including Colombia, Iraq, Somalia, Pakistan, Guatemala, Mexico, Nigeria, Niger, Mali, India and Bangladesh.

In 2008, Paris-Match sent her back to Afghanistan to cover "the Afghan side, after the ambush." She managed to gain the trust of the Taliban, whom she had met before, and obtain their authorization to take photographs. The publication of these photographs caused an uproar in French public opinion. Also in 2008, she got notice for her pictures of Somalian pirates. Her 2009 story on the oil war in Nigeria was awarded the Photo Trophy and Public Prize by the Prix Bayeux-Calvados des correspondents de guerre (Bayeux-Calvados Awards for war correspondents) in 2010.

In 2006, she published her first book, Afghanistan, Regards Croises with journalist Marie Bourreau. In 2011, she published Carnets de Reportages du XXIe siècle with journalist Manon Querouil.

== Honours ==
- Lagardere Grant for Young Talent in 2006
- Canon & AFJ Prize for Best Female Photojournalist during the Perpignan festival in 2006
- Best Young Photographer at the Scoop Festival in Angers in 2008
- World Press Photo, 3rd Prize Contemporary Issues in 2009
- Best War photoreportage at Bayeux Festival in 2010
- Nikon Prize for the Best War Photoreportage at Bayeux Festival in 2010

== Publications ==
- With Marie Bourreau:
  - Afghanistan, Regards Croises, 2006. ISBN 978-2012401204
- With Manon Querouil:
  - Carnets de reportages du XXIe siècle, 2011. ISBN 978-2916954844
  - Profession reporters : Deux baroudeuses en terrain miné, 2015. ISBN 978-2732466460
