= Combat Logistics Regiment 2 =

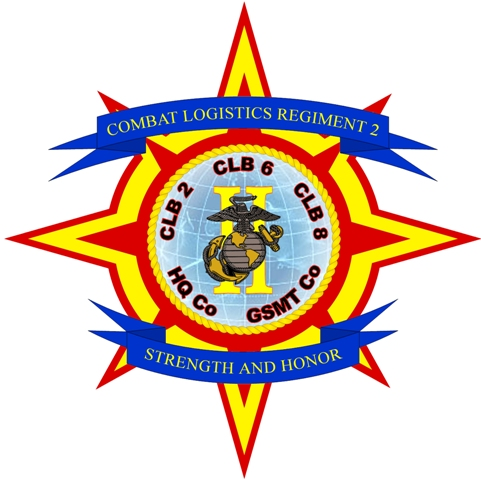
- Country: United States
- Allegiance: United States of America
- Branch: United States Marine Corps
- Type: Logistics
- Part of: 2nd Marine Logistics Group; II Marine Expeditionary Force
- Garrison/HQ: Marine Corps Base Camp Lejeune
- Mottos: "Strength and Honor"
- Engagements: Operation Iraqi Freedom

Commanders
- Current commander: Colonel Joseph M. Garaux
- Command Sergeant Major: SgtMaj Paris Mintz

Combat Logistics Regiment 2 (CLR 2) is a logistics regiment of the United States Marine Corps. The unit is based at Marine Corps Base Camp Lejeune, North Carolina and falls under the command of the 2d Marine Logistics Group (2d MLG) and the II Marine Expeditionary Force (II MEF).

== Mission ==
CLR-2 provides direct support to the II Marine Expeditionary Force. They train, rapidly task organize, deploy, employ, fight and redeploy in order to provide direct support logistics combat support to all maneuver elements of II MEF beyond their organic capabilities, in peacetime as well as wartime, in any environment and across the spectrum of conflict in order to allow the II MEF maneuver elements to continue operations independent of any logistically driver operational pauses.

== Subordinate units ==
- Headquarters Company
- Combat Logistics Battalion 2
- Combat Logistics Battalion 6
- Combat Logistics Battalion 8
- 2nd Distribution Support Battalion

== History ==
=== World War II ===
2d Service Battalion was commissioned on February 15, 1941, in San Diego, California. The battalion deployed to Wellington, New Zealand in October 1942. The battalion participated in combat operations at Tarawa, Saipan, Tinian, and the Okinawa. At the end of the war the battalion went to Nagasaki in September 1945 as part of the Occupation of Japan. In January 1946 the battalion moved to Sasebo, Japan. In July 1946, 2d Service Battalion returned to the United States at Marine Corps Base Camp Lejeune, North Carolina. The battalion was decommissioned on November 18, 1947.

=== 1950s - 1980s ===
The battalion was reactivated October 19, 1949, at MCB Camp Lejeune, North Carolina. On December 15, 1954, the battalion was assigned to the 2d Marine Division, Fleet Marine Force, Atlantic. Elements of the battalion participated in the Cuban Missile Crisis in October 1962. On April 15, 1976, the battalion was redesignated again as Headquarters and Service Battalion, 2d Division Support Group, 2d Marine Division. Three years later on May 1, 1979, the battalion was redesignated as 2d Landing Support Battalion, 2d Force Service Support Group.

=== 1990s - to present ===
2d Landing Support Battalion participated in Operations Desert Shield and Desert Storm in Saudi Arabia and Kuwait in 1990-1991. In November 1998 the battalion supported humanitarian relief efforts in Honduras, El Salvador and Guatemala in the wake of Hurricane Mitch. On March 30, 2000, the battalion was redesignated as the 2d Transportation Support Battalion (2d TSB). The battalion took part in the 2003 invasion of Iraq and supported follow-on deployments to Iraq from August 2004 - February 2005 and March 2006 through October 2007. On May 18, 2006, the battalion was again redesignated as Combat Logistics Regiment 2 (CLR-2) 2d Marine Logistics Group and participated in Operation Enduring Freedom, Afghanistan, May 2009-March 2010 and January 2013-January 2014.

== See also ==
- List of United States Marine Corps regiments
- Organization of the United States Marine Corps
