= Combat Logistics Battalion 8 =

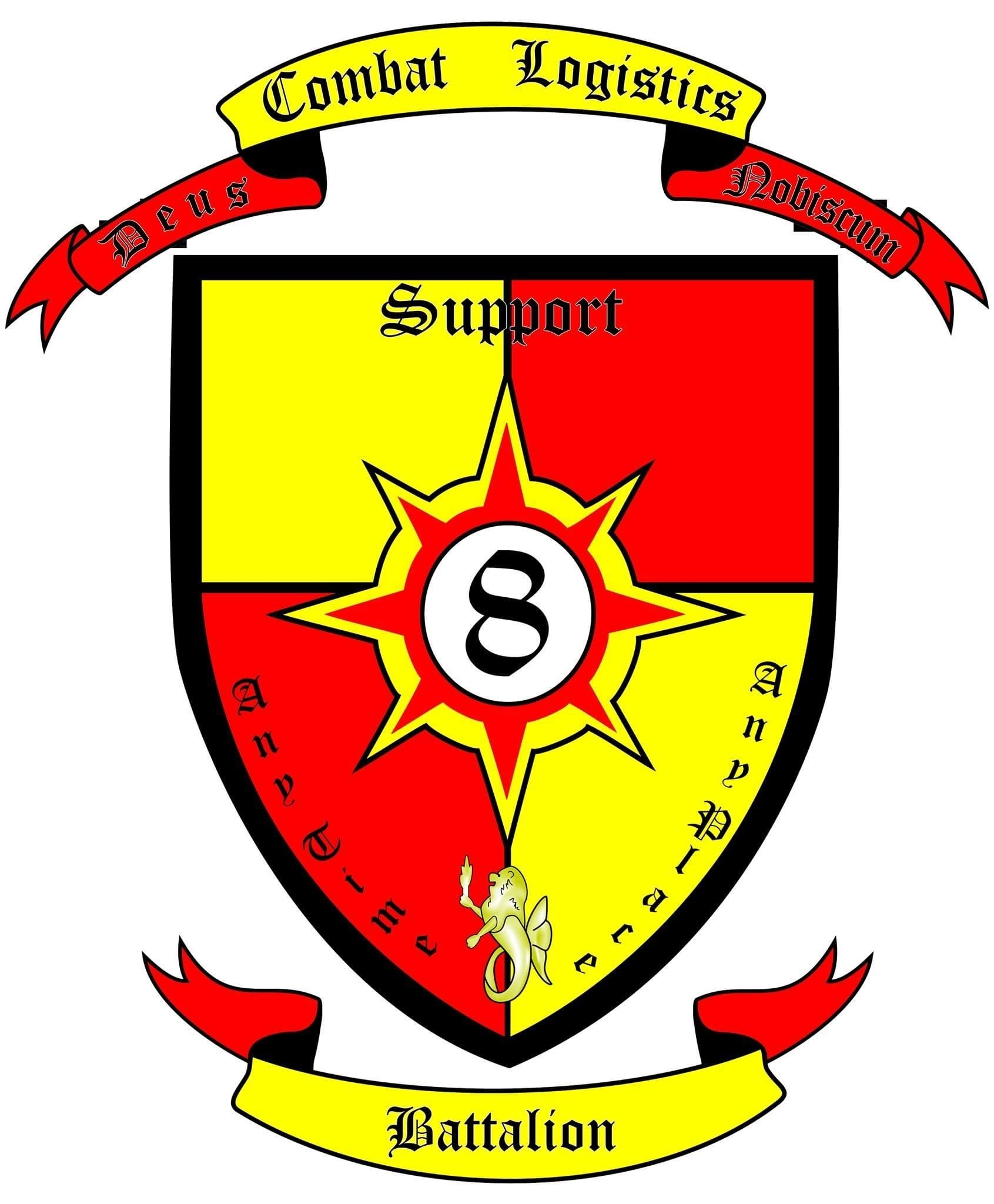
- Combat Logistics Battalion 8 logo
- Active: 13 March 2005 - 7 November 2013, 1 October 2015 - Present
- Country: United States
- Allegiance: United States of America
- Branch: United States Marine Corps
- Type: Logistics
- Part of: Combat Logistics Regiment 2; 2nd Marine Logistics Group
- Garrison/HQ: Marine Corps Base Camp Lejeune
- Mottos: Anytime, Any Place
- Engagements: Operation Desert Storm; Operation Iraqi Freedom; Operation Enduring Freedom; Operation Unified Response

Commanders
- Current commander: LtCol Joshua M. Lewis
- Command Sergeant Major: SgtMaj Jeremy Bland
- Notable commanders: Michael E. McWilliams Daniel W. Robnett

Combat Logistics Battalion 8 (CLB-8) is a logistics battalion of the United States Marine Corps. It is part of Combat Logistics Regiment 2 and the 2nd Marine Logistics Group. The unit is based out of the Marine Corps Base Camp Lejeune, North Carolina.

== Mission ==
Combat Logistics Battalion 8 provides medium and heavy-lift motor transport support.

== Subordinate units ==
- Combat Logistics Company Alpha
- Combat Logistics Company Bravo
- General Support Company
- Headquarters and Service Company

== History ==
Combat Service Support Detachment 28 (CSSD-28) was commissioned on September 20, 2004. CSSD-28 was assigned to the 2d Force Service Support Group. On March 13, 2005, CSSD-28 was re-designated as Combat Logistics Battalion 8.

CLB 8 deployed to Camp Fallujah, Iraq in support of Operation Iraqi Freedom from February 2005 to February 2006 and from September 2007 to March 2008. During these deployments, CLB 8 sailors and Marines dispatched approximately 100 combat logistics patrols that provided units with supply for combat operations. The battalion was also responsible for material handling missions, augmenting military police, conducting escort, road sweep, road repair, and explosive disposal missions. It also conducted vehicle recovery missions and contact team visits and provided a squad of female Marines to assist in screening and searching Iraqi women at entry control points and checkpoints. Finally, the battalion's engineers constructed vital control points throughout the area of operation and provided engineer services to the II MEF Headquarters as well as Iraqi Security Forces.

The battalion deployed to Afghanistan from May to December of 2009 as part of the 2nd Marine Expeditionary Brigade. CLB 8 was part of the 17,000-troop increase announced by President Obama in mid-February 2009. The battalion deployed to Afghanistan again from January to August 2011, and January to July 2013. During these deployments, CLB 8 sailors and Marines conducted convoy operations, route security, road sweeps, and maintenance and explosive ordnance removal support. In 2011, CLB 8 conducted a six day convoy that escorted the Logistics Kandak (Battalion) of the 215th Corps of the Afghan National Army to its headquarters in Helmand Province, Afghanistan. The convoy consisted of over 100 vehicles and 600 personnel from the ANA and U.S. Marine Corps.

Two months after its 2009 deployment to Afghanistan, CLB 8 was deployed in support of Operation Unified Response. This mission was a humanitarian operation that provided relief to the Haitian people after the devastating 2010 earthquake.

Four months after returning from its third Afghan mission, CLB 8 was deactivated aboard Marine Corps Base Camp Lejeune, North Carolina. The colors were furled on November 7, 2013. Just shy of two years from its deactivation date, CLB 8's colors flew again when, on October 1, 2015, the battalion was reactivated and assigned to Combat Logistics Regiment 2. Since reactivation, CLB 8 has deployed twice in support of the Special Purpose MAGTF Crisis Response Africa and the Marine Rotational Force – Europe, and has provided the II MEF with crucial logistics support.

In October 2022, CLB-8 was assigned as the “experimental battalion”, testing new equipment and personnel structures in accordance with USMC Force Design 2030.

Throughout 2023-2024, CLB-8 continues numerous experimental initiatives including bridging, watercraft, piloted and autonomous ground vehicles, and UAVs.

Summer 2023, CLB-8 deployed to Colombia, Honduras, and aboard the USS New York during UNITAS exercise in SOUTHCOM; exercising numerous experimental equipment and task organized detachments.

In 2024, CLB-8 was announced as the Marine Corps Large Logistics Unit of the Year, per MARADMIN 023-24.

During 2024 CLB-8 executed two overseas deployments in support of Marine Rotational Force - Europe, (MRF-E) executing operations in Norway, Sweden, and Finland.

2025 the unit completed an ITX, service level training in 29 Palms, CA.

== Past Leaders ==
Battalion Commanding Officers
Leader	Time Period
LtCol Patrick N. Kelleher	20 Sep 2004 - 31 Mar 2005
LtCol Francis X. Carroll	11 Sep 2005 – 01 Nov 2006
LtCol V. M. Hutcherson	1 Nov 2006 – 27 Jun 2008
LtCol R. C. Braney	27 Jun 2008 – 24 Jun 2010
LtCol M. E. McWilliams	25 Jun 2010 - 7 Nov 2013
LtCol Shawn P. Grzybowski	1 Oct 2015 – 3 Aug 2017
Maj Sean P. Cox	3 Aug 2017 – 30 Aug 2017
LtCol Kenneth C. Gawronski	30 Aug 2017 – 24 July 2019
LtCol Robert L. Taylor	24 July 2019 – 27 May 2021
LtCol E.S. Manzanet	27 May 2021 – 17 Mar 2023
LtCol Daniel W. Robnett	17 March 2023 – 2 May 2025

Battalion Sergeants Major
Leader	Time Period
1stSgt Billy C. McDowell	15 Sep 2005 – 31 Jan 2006
SgtMaj D. K. Carrow	31 Jan 2006 – 30 Jun 2007
Sgt Maj A. M. Maness	06 Mar 2007 – 12 Jan 2010
1stSgt F. M. Rivera	13 Jan 2010 – 27 Feb 2010
SgtMaj S. L. Lunsford	28 Feb 2010 – 7 Jul 2010
1stSgt J. A. Henderson	7 Jul 2010 – 18 Oct 2010
SgtMaj A. L. Crutcher	18 Oct 10 – 7 Nov 2013
SgtMaj Frank B. Kammer	31 Oct 2017 – 3 Sep 2018
MSgt Jerice M. Leeks	3 Sep 2018 – 30 Nov 2018
SgtMaj Brian A. Price	30 Nov 2018 – 29 April 2021
1stSgt Christopher P. Lewis	29 April 2021 – 15 June 2021
SgtMaj Jonathan A. Carranza	29 April 2021 - 19 August 2022
SgtMaj Byron J. Morris	20 August 2022 - 27 November 2024

== See also ==
- List of United States Marine Corps battalions
- Organization of the United States Marine Corps
