= Uzbin Valley ambush =

2008 battle during the War in Afghanistan

Coordinates: 34°39′42.89″N 69°50′56.91″E

Uzbin Valley Ambush
- Part of the War in Afghanistan
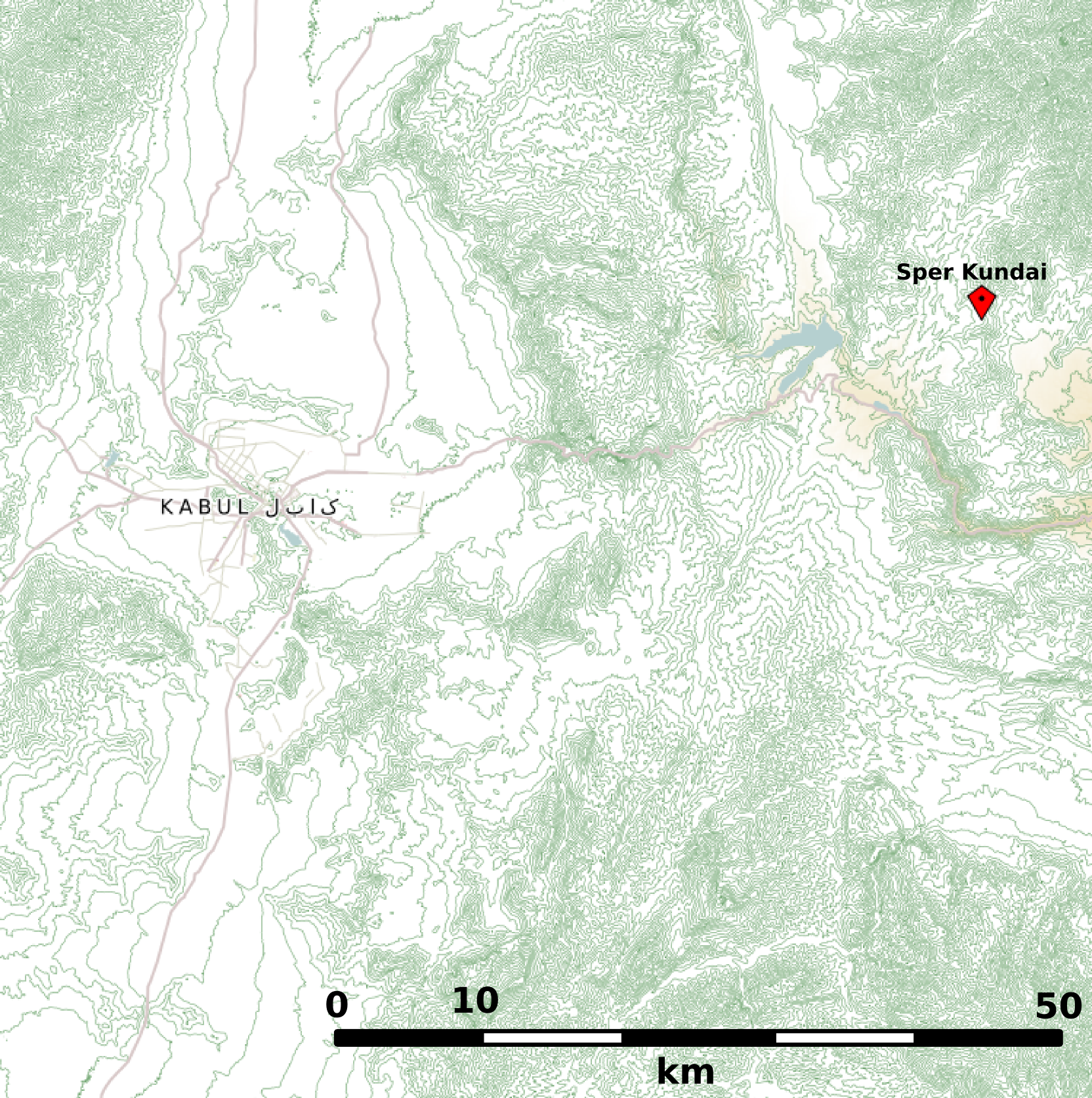
- Map the districts of Kabul, with Spēṟ Kunday marked in red.
Date	18 August 2008
Location	Surobi District, Afghanistan
Result	See aftermath

Belligerents
ISAF: France; United States; Norway; Islamic Republic of Afghanistan	Taliban; Hezb-e-Islami Gulbuddin

Commanders and leaders
Capitaine Arnaud Crézé Colonel de Cevins	Zabihullah Mujahid; Khalid Farooqi; Omar Khattab; Mullah Rahmatullah

Strength
102 troops ambushed initially (60 French, 30 Afghans and 12 Americans); Later reinforcements: 300 French troops; dozens of VAB APCs; 2 French Caracal helicopters; 2 US F-15 Eagle; 2 US UH-60 Black Hawk helicopters; a number of US A-10 Thunderbolt II aircraft; US Kiowa helicopters	140 Taliban insurgents initially; 150 reinforcements

Casualties and losses
(France) 10 killed (France) 21 wounded (Afghanistan) 1 killed and 4 wounded 5 injured (3 seriously)	French claim: 30–80 killed, 18–30 wounded Taliban claim: 10 killed

French International Security Assistance Force (ISAF) troops were ambushed by Afghan Taliban insurgents, with heavy casualties, in the Uzbin Valley outside the village of Spēṟ Kunday in the Surobi District of Kabul province in eastern Afghanistan on 18 August 2008.

In the ambush and subsequent counter-attack operations involving reinforcements, 10 French soldiers were killed, as well as the Afghan interpreter; 21 French soldiers and 2 to 4 Afghan soldiers were wounded, and 20 to 40 civilians also lost their lives. The casualties for the French army were the highest single-day loss since the 1983 Beirut barracks bombings, which killed 58 French soldiers.

Reports in France as well as a NATO one about the incident summarised that the surviving members of the initial coalition forces were "lucky to escape," arguing that they were not adequately supplied and equipped for the ambush and lacked preparation, while facing a planned attack by a well-prepared enemy. However, this version was denied by the French government and the NATO report was dismissed by NATO as a "mere field report" written by a soldier embedded in the patrol and featuring errors.

Later reports by the British newspaper The Times claimed that when the French group took over duties from the Italians, the relative calm of the region until that point had only been obtained by bribery, something the French were unaware of and which led to the assumption that the zone was largely secured already. But these claims were never confirmed, with the Italian Prime Minister calling them "totally baseless accusations". The French military likewise denied the accusations leveled against the Italians.

== Situation in Surobi ==
The sector of Surobi was under Italian control between 2006 and 2007. At the time, Italian troops crossed the 35th parallel only once, as the region beyond was considered to be dangerous. Then and until August 2008, responsibility for the Surobi district switched to 140 Italian troops who had undertaken development projects for the local population, as part of ISAF's "comprehensive approach" strategy. The district was considered a successful example of establishing security and was considered a quiet region despite the known presence of militants loyal to Gulbuddin Hekmatyar in remote areas. The Italian government understands its mandate to be a stabilization mission, without armed operations.

In August, French troops took over from the Italian force, as part of French president Nicolas Sarkozy's initiative to increase France's commitment to the war in Afghanistan. There had been a fear of militants attacking the three dams that operate in the region. In October 2009, The Times published an article stating that the relative calm in the region during the previous Italian occupation and since then had been obtained by Italian secret services bribing local Taliban groups into inaction. The French then ventured into areas with an over-optimistic threat assessment and insufficient equipment. A Taliban commander, Mohammed Ismayel, confirmed the existence of a deal with the Italians, though without corroborating the existence of any financial transactions, and explained that the more aggressive attitude of the French troops had caused the guerrillas to attack them. Silvio Berlusconi denied that any bribes were ever paid and rejected the claims as "totally baseless accusations". The French army explicitly denied the claims.

In contrast to the purely humanitarian operations carried out by the Italians, the French engaged in armed patrols to cut off guerrilla groups from their rear bases in Pakistan. On 15 August, a French patrol was dispatched to Spēṟ Kunday, but without exploring the surrounding passes. Local villagers warned them not to stay, due to the presence of the Taliban, but the French announced their intention to return. Thus, the guerrillas became aware of the French plans to reoccupy the area.

== Ambush ==
=== Order of battle ===
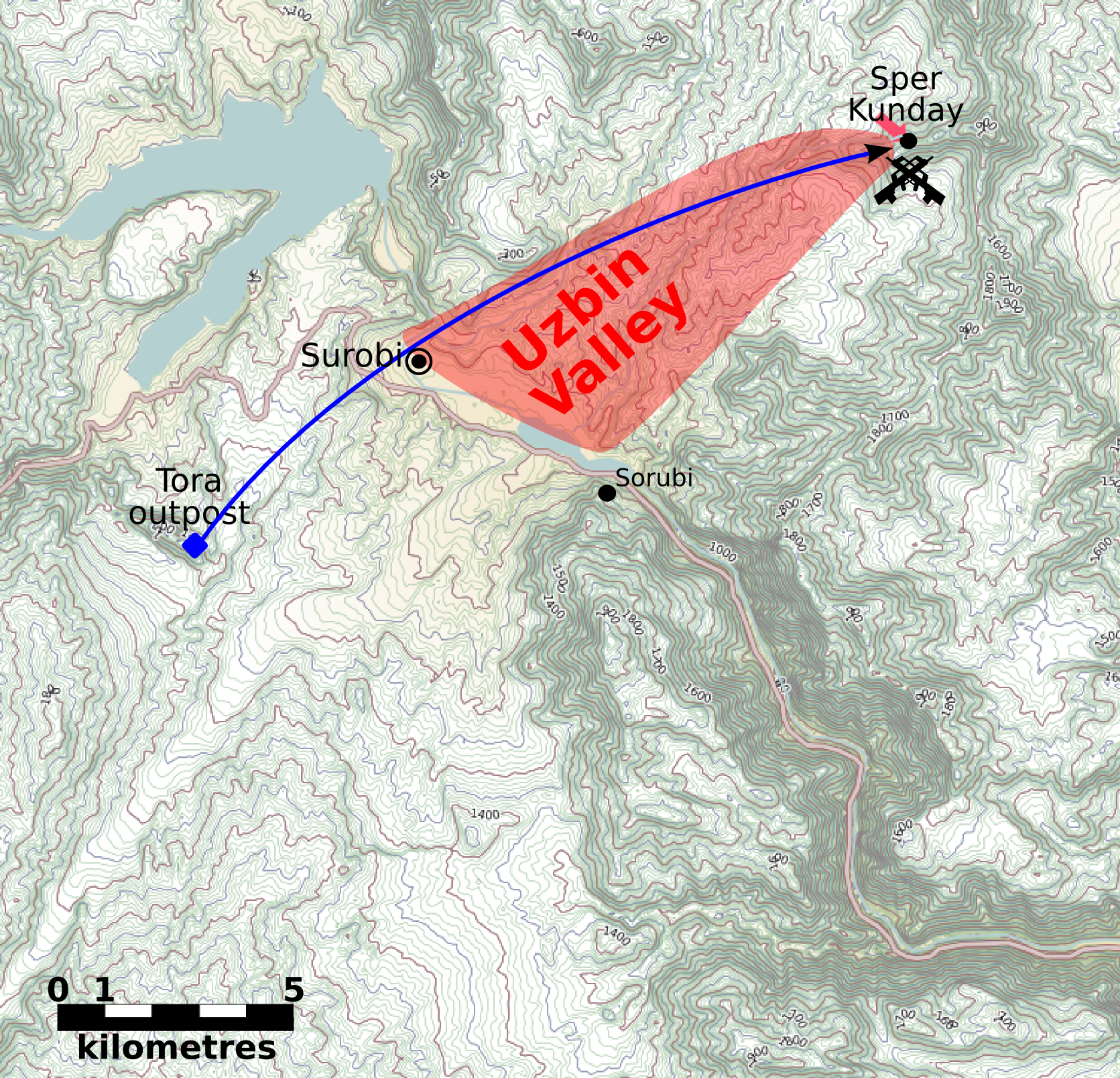

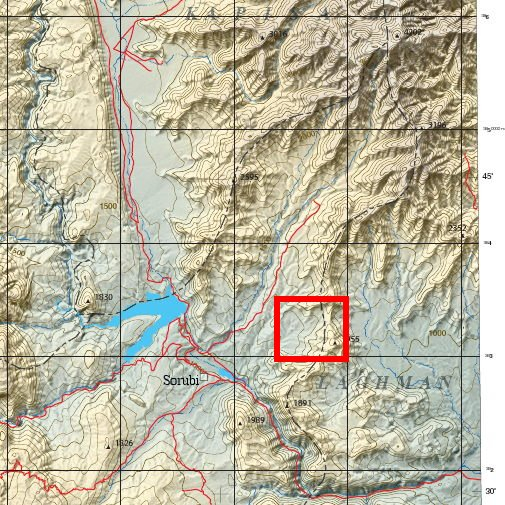

On 18 August, an ISAF column left FOB Tora in Surobi to assess guerrilla activity in the Uzbin valley. It was composed of some 100 troops in 20 vehicles, mostly French, accompanied by elements of the Afghan National Army and some U.S. Special Forces in charge of coordinating air support. The patrol was organized in

- Carmin 2 ("Carmine 2"), a platoon of the 8th Marine Infantry Parachute Regiment (four VAB armoured personnel carriers, 31 men)
- Rouge 4 ("Red 4"), a platoon of the Régiment de marche du Tchad
- a platoon of the Afghan National Army (15 men on 2 pickup trucks) 1st Kandak, 3rd Brigade, 201st Corps
- a platoon of the Afghan National Guard (15 men on 2 pickup trucks)
- a US Special Forces ODA (12 men), composed of a Close Air support team and its escort (3 Humvees).

Rapid Reaction Force

- USMC Embedded Training Team 6-3 (18 US Marines and 3 US Navy Corpsmen) with elements of 1st Kandak, 3rd Brigade, 201st Corps, ANA

Their mission was to explore the field and make contact with local populations to reinforce control of the region. Uzbin Valley is the most populated valley of the sector, with 30,000 inhabitants. The patrol was aware that there were enemy combatants in the valley.

Two hours before the patrol reached the mountain pass, Omar Khattab was alerted and phoned local militant commanders Zabihullah Mujahed and Khalid Farooqi for support, as he began making plans for the attack. This advance warning raised suspicions that Afghan translators, who had deserted at Camp Tora, had leaked information, either voluntarily or under coercion; this was later denied both by the French Army and by the guerrillas, who claimed that they had lookouts and guarded weapon caches in the sector.

One hundred forty fighters took positions around the pass. According to official French statements, the group was composed mainly of non-Afghan elements. This was denied by the rebel leaders, who nevertheless acknowledge that weapons and funds were provided from abroad.

The ambush was mostly improvised by local leaders of the Hezb-e-Islami Gulbuddin, later reinforced by Taliban forces, given the size of the operation, and villagers affiliated with either of these organizations. The ambush was part of a larger plan to surround Kabul, as it occurred on a road to Jalalabad, on which 70% of NATO supplies transit. Orders were given by the headquarters of Hezb-e-Islami Gulbuddin, in Pakistan, in liaison with the Taliban.

The Taliban leaders who carried out the operation deny that Hezb-e-Islami Gulbuddin was involved, and claim that the ambush was prepared in a mere two hours by three Afghan Taliban units.

=== Battle and attempt to surround French troops ===
Arriving 50 metres from the pass, Carmin 2 comes under fire from two guerrilla groups, North and South of its position.

The column was led by Carmin 2 section. Ten kilometres away from their base, at an altitude of 1750 metres on their mountain pass, and around 13:30, the leading platoon reached the end of the roadway. The paratroopers were forced to dismount and advance on foot along a small path. Under Adjutant Gaëtan Evrard, they advanced with part of Carmin 2; Corporal Rodolphe Penon, a medic of the 2nd Foreign Parachute Regiment; and a translator (24 men overall) to inspect a pass situated East of Uzbin Valley, leading to the heights of Sper Kunday. The four VABs and their crew (8 men) remained at the bottom of the pass in support position. Rouge 4 stayed further behind. The Afghan National Army section was delayed by a mechanical failure and later reached the village. The Afghan National Guard section was guarding a checkpoint on the road in the valley.

Rouge 4, storming to the rescue of Carmin 2, comes under fire from a third guerrilla group from a ridge North of Sper Kunday

When the first elements of Carmin 2 were approximately 50 metres from the peak at around 15:30, the group of fifty waiting militants launched their attack, quickly killing the squadron's deputy leader, the radio operator and the Afghan interpreter with Dragunov, AK-47 and RPG-7 fire. Penon was struck by a bullet in the leg while tending the wounded, and killed by a second bullet as Marsouin Noël Livrelli attempted to come to his rescue.

Now disorganised, the paratroopers scrambled to find cover in the mountain brush, as fifty more militants rushed towards their position in a pincer movement from the southern ridge and the village. In addition, several "well-trained snipers" amongst the militants were present, as were heavy mortars, and presented unexpected problems for the Coalition forces. Rocket-propelled grenades damaged three Afghan National Police vehicles. The men of Carmin 2 dispersed over more than 200 meters to shelter themselves and found themselves pinned down. 600 metres below, the VABs started supporting Carmin 2 with suppressing fire from their 12.7mm machine guns.

Dismounting and bypassing Sper Kunday on the North, Rouge 4 encounters a guerrilla group trying to surround the village and the VABs of Carmin 2; battle ensues.

At the same time, Taliban units stormed a ridge North of the village on the rear of Carmin 2, threatening the VABs. Taliban tactics have been described as using modern Western techniques, with a perfectly prepared ambush which pinned French troops in a C-shaped pincer.

From their support position one kilometre from the village, Rouge 4 rushed to help, reaching the heights of Sper Kunday in eight minutes. However, they were unable to make their junction with Carmin 2 and had to support it from a distance, with machine gun fire and 4 Milan missiles. It was then engaged by Taliban snipers and prevented from deploying its mortars as Carmin 2 requested. The Taliban then maneuvered so as to climb down towards the village and surround the patrol, which had to fight to maintain its junction to the valley.

An empty VAB was hit by an RPG, causing some damage but no casualties. Meanwhile, after the death of the interpreter and wounding of four other Afghans, the Afghan National Army forces quickly fled the scene, while the American and French troops remained.

Carmin 2 requested reinforcements at 15:52, and air support at 16:10. Two F-15 fighters that were on alert were guided by the US special forces team, arriving a few minutes later. Anticipating NATO use of air power, the Taliban moved close to French positions, preventing the F-15s from firing to avoid friendly fire casualties. Ten minutes later, A-10 Thunderbolts arrived, but were initially unable to differentiate friendly from enemy forces. One of the A-10's descended into the valley dispensing flares at about 100 feet in an attempt to pause the fighting and identify the exact locations of the pinned-down French troops. The beleaguered paratroopers were able to use hand signals to communicate with the craft. The A-10s established comms with Carmin. After locating friendly forces, Carmin passed coordinates and both A-10s engaged the coordinates with their 30mm GAU-8.

Meanwhile, the men of Carmin 2 were duelling with the Taliban with hand grenades and sniper fire, and began to run out of ammunition.

About thirty minutes after the air support arrived, the French VAB-mounted M2 machine guns ran out of ammunition, and attempts at a counter-attack had to be abandoned.

=== Reinforcements ===
The Swift Reaction Force called from Tora reached the battle at 17:05, 80 minutes into the fight. It was composed of

- Rouge 3, a section of the Régiment de marche du Tchad
- Carmin 3, a section of the 8e Régiment de parachutistes d'infanterie de marine
- a support section with mortars, 20 mm gun VABs and Milan missiles

These reinforcements were engaged by Taliban before even reaching the village, but nevertheless managed to provide suppressive fire for Carmin 2 and Rouge 4, and supply the VABs of Carmin 2 with ammunition.

Meanwhile, the Taliban were joined by several dozen men.

At 17:50, the Taliban closed in on Sper Kunday, almost completing their pincer movement. Under the critical circumstances, Thunderbolts and Kiowas started close air support, in spite of the entanglement of friendly and enemy troops. Air operations lasted for one hour, during which the remnants of Carmin 2 were able to reach the village. A medevac flight consisting of two US UH-60 Black Hawk helicopters, one medevac and a chase escort from Task Force 6-101st, attempted to land to evacuate wounded, but were prevented by Taliban fire. Two additional USAF combat search and rescue (CSAR) HH-60s arrived on-station to provide relief coverage to allow the medevac flight to return to base. The CSAR HH-60s remained on-station, but were also unable to land and evacuate wounded. The Thunderbolts identified a heavy machine gun, 14.7 mm, at the top of a ridge firing into the valley. One of the A-10’s successfully engaged the Taliban forces with 5 strafing passes while the other A-10 simultaneously coordinated with the Helicopters for casualty evacuation. The approximate 20 Taliban fighters killed on the ridge near the 14.5mm machine gun are thought to be the location of the Taliban’s command and control. After this location was destroyed, the fighting decreased greatly and the Medevac was expedited. Some French soldiers complained about friendly fire incidents, either from US aircraft or from ANA elements; these were later denied by French military authorities.

At 18:15, two Caracal helicopters, previously reserved for a possible evacuation of Afghan President Hamid Karzai, arrived from Kabul and landed a physician and Air Commandos. They quickly turned back and returned with 4 tonnes of supplies, most of it ammunition, which was immediately carried to units under fire. They later evacuated the first wounded. These elements worked non-stop for 14 hours to provide supplies and medical evacuations.

At 18:25, LLR 81mm mortars of the support group started firing. One hour later, as the sun set, Carmin 2 was still trying to break contact, but most of its men were still pinned down by Taliban trying to surround the village. 12.7mm machine guns began to run low on ammunition again.

At 20:00, three sections of the Régiment de Marche du Tchad arrived by road, with 120 mm heavy mortars. As night fell, Predator drones guided mortar fire.

=== Regain of control by French forces ===
At 21:00, Carmin 3 started climbing the pass to rescue the wounded and gather the dead. One hour later, reinforcements from Kabul cleared the surroundings of the village. US aircraft, mostly OH-58 Kiowa and AC-130, pounded ridges nearby.

Around midnight, the sector was under control, firing around Sper Kunday had stopped, and Carmin 3 and Rouge 3 had retaken the positions leading to the pass.

The first bodies were found at 1:40. Just before 02:00, Norwegian Special Forces entered the area and began collecting the last of the wounded French troops, and gathering the bodies. Most of the bodies had been looted and some were discovered mutilated by the enemy. The last bodies were found in the morning.

Meanwhile, the last elements of Carmin 2 crawled down to the village, sometimes metres away from Taliban fighters.

In the morning, with the pass under control, a new Carmin 1 section was transported by Caracal helicopters to explore the ridges leading to the pass. They were soon under fire from the North, sustaining mortar, machine gun and light weapon fire. These attackers were fended off when Carmin 1 called in 120 mm mortar fire on their positions. By noon, the Taliban had evacuated the area and NATO forces disengaged.

Nine French soldiers had been killed and another 18 wounded. A tenth soldier was killed and two others were injured after the roadway collapsed under the weight of their VAB. The Afghan National Army was tasked with re-entering the area and retrieving bodies, and confirmed the death of 13 militants, while some estimates had been much higher. French sources estimated 80 Taliban and their leaders killed in the ambush and in pursuit operations in the following days.

Although the militant commanders later spoke of summarily executing the wounded French troops and capturing a female soldier, these claims were denied by the French government.

=== Hunt for Taliban and bombings ===
The Taliban retreated into Laghman Province with their dead and wounded. They dispersed into three villages near the place of the ambush. These villages were bombed by NATO for three days, causing 40 civilian deaths, destroying 150 houses and forcing 2000 people to flee. One of the villages received 70 bombs, prompting inhabitants to complain of reprisals. General Georgelin defended these actions as "destroying two huge weapon caches helping the logistics of the insurgents", but did not address the question of "collateral damage". Afghan intelligence services have stated that most of the victims of the bombings were women and children, which they claim proves that the men had taken part in the ambush.

Sper Kundai was struck by four Milan missiles.

Taliban leader Faruki, who claimed to have led part of the ambush, stated that "a bombed house means a new fighter on our side. That is called vengeance. This is normal. Especially here".

== Aftermath ==
=== Casualties ===
The battle itself was unexceptional in 2008 Afghanistan: the same day, tens of civilians were killed by a car bomb in Khost, and suicide bombers had attacked US military installation, yielding a 12-hour battle. However, the loss of life for the French Army represented the most significant single incident since the 1983 Beirut barracks bombing, which killed 58 soldiers, and the third greatest single military loss since Operation Red Wings.

==== ISAF ====
8e Régiment Parachutiste d'Infanterie de Marine
S/Cpl. Damien Buil
C/Sgt. Sébastien Devaz
Cpl. Nicolas Grigoire
Pte. Julien Le Pahun
Pte. Anthony Rivière
Pte. Kévin Chassaing
Pte. Damien Gaillet
Pte. Alexis Taani
2e Régiment Étranger de Parachutistes
S/Cpl. Rodolphe Penon
Régiment de Marche du Tchad
Pte. Melam Bouama

The French took the brunt of the casualties among ISAF forces, with 10 dead—8 killed by bullets or shrapnel, one by a bladed weapon, and the last one in a road accident as he rode to the battle. 23 French and two Afghan ISAF soldiers were wounded.

The Afghan translator who accompanied Carmin 2 was initially reported to have been found dead, having been tortured and mutilated. It was later reported that he may in fact have disappeared from the group "a few hours" prior to the ambush, stoking reports he may have been the one who alerted the militant commanders, which was denied by the French military, who said his body had been recovered and returned to his family.

Reports on the details of the casualties were confused and contradictory. Initial official reports mentioned losses during the very first moments of the battle, as the Taliban shot a carefully aimed volley by surprise. However, further testimonies by the soldiers coming back from the field reported casualties during the entire engagements, and notably soldiers dying from otherwise recoverable wounds because they could not be evacuated. Carmin 2 sustained most of the casualties, with 9 killed and 17 wounded out of 31 men.

Some military equipment of value was captured by the guerrillas, including four FAMAS assault rifles, two Minimi light machine guns, two FR-F2 sniper rifles, one LGI grenade launcher, six OB 72 binoculars, several ER 350 radios, nine flak jackets, helmets, etc. Six VABs were damaged.

Some early reports mentioned that three or four bodies had been found lined up, implicating that these soldiers could have been captured alive and executed; this was denied by French military authorities and the government.

Taliban leaders claimed to have captured and killed wounded soldiers, and to have destroyed five vehicles and used land mines.

==== Guerrillas ====
The number of casualties among guerrilla fighters is not reliably known. The French military authorities mentioned a range of 30 to 80 killed. On 29 September Afghan leader Gulbuddin Hekmatyar claimed responsibility for the attack, and said that ten of his men had been killed in the fighting. The French Army claimed that an "important leader" had been killed during the battle. Only one body was found by ISAF forces after the ambush.

Four Milan missiles and a number of airstrikes were launched on Sper Kunday, and aerial bombing struck several other villages in the following days; Pajhwok Afghan News reported up to 40 killed and 2,000 refugees caused by the bombings.

=== Reactions ===
News of the ambush yielded international displays of sympathy, with Afghan president Hamid Karzai giving his condolences to the French people. Heads of State and heads of government, including Gordon Brown, George W. Bush, Silvio Berlusconi and Stephen Harper, also commiserated.

On 20 August, Nicolas Sarkozy traveled to Kabul to speak to the French soldiers stationed in Afghanistan. He reasserted his commitment to pursuing the war against the Taliban, and the soldiers who were killed in the ambush were posthumously made knights of the Légion d'honneur. Although the attack led to a steep decline in public support for French involvement in the war. A CSA poll showed 55% favoring pulling back the troops from Afghanistan, and only 36% supporting the operations.

On 10 September, head of staff Jean-Louis Georgelin testified before the military and Foreign Affairs commissions of the National Assembly. On 12, families of the dead were invited to travel to Afghanistan, accompanied by Defence minister Hervé Morin.

Personal effects of the French casualties were offered for sale in marketplaces, and photos of militant troops in French uniforms infuriated the government. Survivors of the attack said that the American warplanes caused friendly fire casualties, which was disputed by NATO.

Left-wing opposition MPs requested a vote regarding the continued presence of French forces in Afghanistan, which was reaffirmed by the National Assembly on 22 September. Prime Minister François Fillon claimed to have "learnt the lessons of the ambush", and announced further military deployment, amounting to about 100 men with drones and helicopters.

=== Military consequences ===
On 20 August, US military authorities in Afghanistan claimed to have killed two of the leaders involved in the ambush in Kapisa Province.

On 18 October 2008, ISAF and Afghan forces returned to Sper Kunday as to prevent a permanent build-up of Taliban influence in the region. Fighting ensued and 7 militant fighters were killed or wounded. French military authorities claim that villagers are subject to strong pressure from the militants.

In the following months, the French military took steps to send 20mm-armed Air Force VIB vehicles to reinforce the VABs of the Army. The Army 20mm VAB, the T20/13, requires reloading the gun outside of the vehicle.

=== News reports and the media war ===
==== Initial Taliban reports ====
Accounts by Taliban published by Al-Somood report that "as for the number of French killed during the fight, it amounts to several tens. Local and international media have reported 11 killed and 21 wounded, but that is not true at all". In it, the Taliban refer to themselves as "Mujahideen", and, occasionally, to the French as "crusaders".

The account goes on, describing the patrol as consisting of "18 tanks and armored vehicles", which it claims were all destroyed, save for five that were captured. It also boasts that five French soldiers had been taken prisoners and that "upon arrival of airplanes, the mujahideen could not take them along and had to kill them on the spot". More specifically, it mentions the employment of improvised explosive devices; the French reported not finding any.

The report also claims that "large amounts of weapons and ammunition" were captured, and that a film of the fight was made, showing "the dead, the booty and the destroyed armored vehicles, thanks to God". It finishes with an accurate assessment of French public opinion and political debate, notably mentioning Hervé Morin and François Hollande by name.

In November, Belgian journalist Joanie de Rijke met with Sher Mohammed (Ghurghust), who claimed to know the full story of the attacks, and was captured and held prisoner for six days before being released. She was shown a heart-shaped pendant that the commander claimed was taken from a female soldier in the attack, and the knife that a commander Ghazi claimed to have used to kill four of the French troops.

==== Initial reports by French authorities ====
Initial statements of the French authorities claimed that those killed were "during the first instants" of the ambush, which was quickly contradicted by testimonies from survivors.

Furthermore, the Ministry of Defence did not report that one of the dead had been killed by a bladed weapon. This was deliberately omitted after the Minister talked with the family, who requested that this detail be kept from the public. The information nevertheless surfaced, raising suspicions as to the truthfulness of official reports. The Ministry of Defence finally confirmed the fact on 5 September.

On 18 August, General Benoît Puga characterised the outcome of the event as

The mission was a success. Pace some armchair tacticians who cast judgement from 7000 kilometres away, in the comfort of their house, I take note that the enemy was forced to flee and that he took quite a beating

==== Interview of Taliban leaders with Paris Match ====
Inner double page of the magazine: "Taliban parade with their French trophies"

Paris Match photographer Véronique de Viguerie and reporter Éric de la Varenne managed to meet with a group of Taliban claiming to have taken part in the ambush. Two of them were photographed wearing French flak jackets, helmets and signature FAMAS rifles, as well as French uniforms in Camouflage Central-Europe patterns. The group leader, Faruki, demanded that French forces depart Afghanistan lest they all be killed. He stated that the French had crossed a red line by entering Uzbin valley, which they consider to be their territory. He further claimed that no French had been tortured, and returned a watch taken on the body of a dead soldier as a token.

Paris Match published the photographs and the messages of the Taliban leader on 4 September, causing an uproar in France, particularly from the families of the dead soldiers and the government. Part of the press accused Paris Match of allowing itself to be used as a Taliban propaganda media.

On the other hand, the Taliban having military equipment was seen as patent proof that a number of bodies had been abandoned for some time, and unconfirmed suspicions that soldiers had been captured alive and executed.

=== Criticism of the organisation of the patrol ===
==== Frenic report ====
On 3 September 2008, Le Canard Enchaîné published a FRENIC (French National Intelligence Cell) report to the General Staff and to military intelligence, claiming that the reconnaissance patrol had been ill-prepared. It pointed to ammunition running low during the first incident in a patrol planned to last for several days, lack of support weapons in a 100-man patrol, and lack of advance observations and surveillance. The existence of this report was categorically denied by the Ministry of Defence, and its credibility was questioned by journalist Jean Guisnel, who noted that several passages of the "secret report" had been copied from the Le Point website.

==== NATO report ====
On 20 September 2008, The Globe and Mail published a "secret NATO report". The document claims that the patrol lacked supplies and preparation, that it ran low on ammunition 90 minutes into the fight, that the French section had only one radio, and that Afghan forces left their armament behind and fled the battle, while the Taliban seemed very well prepared.

Existence of the report was at first denied by the French Defence minister, the French General Staff, and NATO. It was later acknowledged, but stated to be a mere "field report", redacted by the leader of the US team embedded in the patrol, and featuring errors.

==== Internal criticism ====
French Army officers, both in France and in Afghanistan, criticized the lack of ammunition, radios, mortars, and air reconnaissance, and the fact that reinforcements had been brought by road only.

Criticism on the website of the dead soldiers prompted the colonel of the 8th Marine Infantry Parachute Regiment to threaten litigation against critical commentators.

General Michel Stollsteiner, commander of Allied forces in the Kabul region during the ambush, acknowledged an "excess of confidence" in that the zone was considered to be largely secured. Another officer admitted that French forces had prepared for harassment with roadside bombs and suicide attacks, but not for coordinated guerrilla actions, and that the level of tactical skill shown by the guerrillas had been unexpected.

=== Later incidents ===
Sixteen months later, on 17 December 2009, coalition forces conducted Operation Septentrion in the Uzbin Valley, "to show these insurgents that we can go where we want when we want" according to a French military spokesperson. An Afghan flag was planted in a key village of the Uzbin Valley; it was the furthest north coalition forces had been in the Valley.

On 30 August 2010, another French soldier was killed in the Uzbin Valley.

== Notes and references ==
=== Bibliography ===
- Mourir pour l'Afghanistan, by Jean-Dominique Merchet. Jacob Duvernet, 19 novembre 2008. ISBN 2-84724-219-8
- Opérations extérieures – Les Volontaires du 8e Rpima, Liban 1978-Afghanistan 2009, by Frédéric Pons. Presses de la Cité, 2009
