= Khalid Farooqi =

Afghan politician

Khalid Farooqi (died 2017) was an Afghan politician from Paktika Province. He led a splinter faction of the Hizb-i Islami Afghanistan and was a member of the Wolesi Jirga. He fought against French and Afghani forces.
