= 3rd Light Armored Reconnaissance Battalion =

3d Light Armored Reconnaissance Battalion (3d LAR)
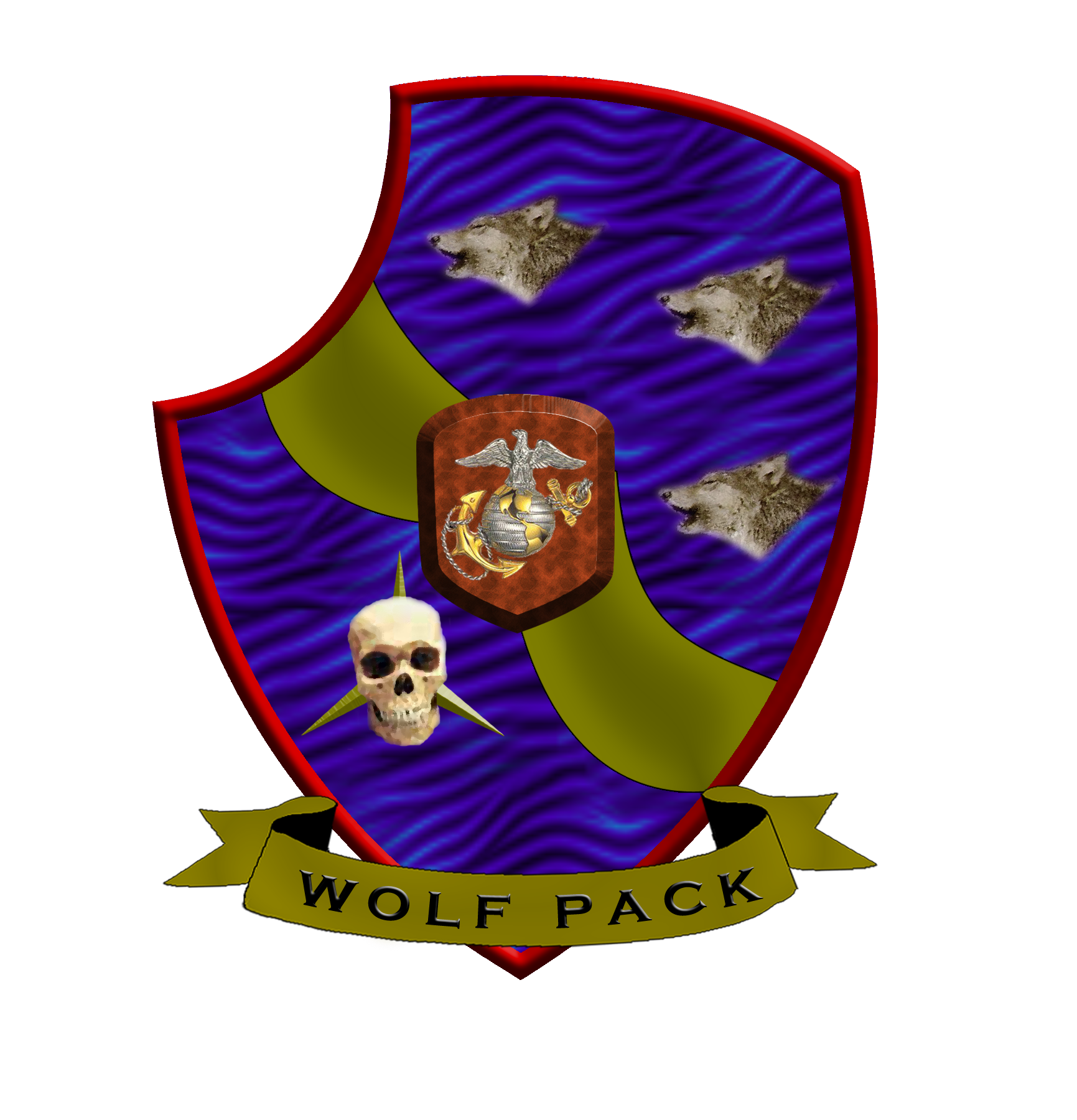
- 3d LAR insignia
- Active: May 1983–present
- Country: United States of America
- Branch: United States Marine Corps
- Type: Armored reconnaissance battalion
- Role: Armored reconnaissance, security, and limited offensive operations
- Part of: 1st Marine Division; I Marine Expeditionary Force
- Garrison/HQ: Marine Corps Air Ground Combat Center Twentynine Palms
- Nickname: "Wolfpack"
- Mottos: "The strength of the pack is the wolf, the strength of the wolf is the pack."
- Engagements: Operation Desert Storm; Operation Restore Hope; War on terror: Operation Iraqi Freedom; 2003 invasion of Iraq; Operation Phantom Fury; Operation Enduring Freedom

Commanders
- Current commander: LtCol John J. Dick

3d Light Armored Reconnaissance Battalion (3D LAR BN) is a fast and mobilized armored terrestrial reconnaissance battalion of the United States Marine Corps. Their primary weapon system is the LAV-25 and they are part of the 1st Marine Division and I Marine Expeditionary Force. The unit is based out of the Marine Corps Air Ground Combat Center Twentynine Palms, California.

== Organization ==
=== Battalion level ===
An 3d Light Armored Reconnaissance Battalion currently consists of three line companies and one headquarters and service company organized as follows:

- Huron Company (H&S Co)
- Apache Company (A Co)
- Blackfoot Company (B Co)
- Comanche Company (C Co)

=== Company level ===
An organic Light Armored Reconnaissance Company consists of five platoons of light armored vehicles (LAVs) organized as follows:

- Headquarters (HQ) - One command and control (LAV-C2), three logistic (LAV-L), one recovery (LAV-R), and two LAV-25 variants.
- Line platoons - First (1st) or Red, Second (2nd) or White, and Third (3rd) or Blue - Four LAV-25 variants each.
- Weapons (Wpns) - Two mortar (LAV-M) and four anti-tank (LAV-AT) variants.

An LAV-25 crew consists of a driver, usually a junior 0313 (the MOS designation for LAV Crewman), a gunner, and a vehicle commander (VC). The gunner operates the main gun, the M242 Bushmaster chaingun, and the VC makes target acquisition changes and assists the gunner in making adjustments. The remaining crew consists of up to six scouts (0311s), but in most cases there are only three or four assigned per vehicle. There is also a corpsman and a LAV mechanic (2147) per platoon. The LAV-C2 crew consists of a driver, a VC, radio operators, and depending on the situation may include the Company Commander (CO), the company First Sergeant (1stSgt), or a forward air controller (FAC). The LAV-R is made up of a driver, VC (normally the company Maintenance Chief), and a couple of LAV mechanics. The logistics variants consist of a driver, VC, and based on their configuration, mission dependent personnel, e.g. corpsmen, mechanics, and scouts. The weapons vehicles include drivers, VCs, and mortar men (0341) or anti-tank men (0352) respectively.

The company commander or executive officer (XO) usually VC one of the LAV-25s in HQ platoon, the other being commanded by the company's Master Gunner or HQ platoon sergeant. The company First Sergeant, company Operations Chief, and normally a mechanic have command of the three LAV-Ls in HQ platoon. The three line platoons are commanded by first or second lieutenants, who, when the platoon is split, command one section (two vehicles) while the platoon sergeant commands the other section. In regards to Wpns platoon, the vehicles are usually commanded by their respective section chiefs, the Wpns Platoon Commander, and other qualified members from their platoon.

== History ==
=== Early years ===
The 3d Light Armored Vehicle Battalion originally began as Company A (Reinforced), 1st Light Armored Vehicle Battalion in May 1983, and began receiving LAVs in April 1984. Company A, 1st Light Armored Vehicle Battalion became Company A, 1st Light Armored Vehicle Battalion in late 1985. The 1st Light Armored Vehicle Battalion, 27th Marines, 7th Marine Amphibious Brigade was activated on 11 September 1986. The battalion was re-designated as the 3d Light Armored Infantry Battalion on 1 October 1988 and subsequently relocated to Okinawa, Japan in February 1989. The battalion returned to Twentynine Palms on 18 July 1991 as part of Regimental Combat Team 7 (RCT-7).

=== Gulf War and the 1990s ===
Detachment 3d Light Armored Infantry Battalion deployed to Saudi Arabia on 16 August 1990 in support of Operation Desert Shield, as part of the 7th Marine Expeditionary Brigade, Task Force Lima. Later, the battalion conducted screening and deception operations as part of Task Force Shepherd, the forward unit of 1st Marine Division. On 25 January 1991, Company B saw combat in the first ground offensive action of the war by participating in an artillery raid with 5th Battalion, 11th Marines. On the night of 29 January 1991, during the battle of Umm Hjul, Company D was the primary unit to turn back a major Iraqi attack. Once the ground war commenced, 3d Light Armored Infantry Battalion again found itself at the forefront of action. While assigned to the First Marine Division Command Post on the second day of the ground war, Company B decisively repelled an Iraqi counterattack on the Command Post. Additionally, Company D provided a mobile screen for Task Force Ripper, the leading unit for the division. On the third day of the ground offensive, Task Force Shepherd was the first coalition force to enter Kuwait City and captured the Kuwait International Airport.

During the Gulf War, Company A had been deployed to Camp Schwab, Okinawa. When a large earthquake hit the Philippines, Company A, participated in relief efforts. In June 1991, Mount Pinatubo erupted, and once again, Company A reinforced, was called upon to provide security against looters on Subic Bay Naval Base and participated in the cleanup efforts. This was Operation Fiery Vigil. Company A returned to Twentynine Palms on 7 August 1991, completing an arduous 15-month deployment.

From December 1992 to April 1993, 3d Light Armored Infantry Battalion deployed Company B and Company C along with the forward command group and forward logistics support for Operation Restore Hope in Somalia. The mission consisted of convoy escorts, delivering over 4,000 metric tons of grain to outlying areas. During the LA riots of 1992, the battalion mobilized at Twentynine Palms, with intentions of assisting law enforcement in Los Angeles. This never came to be, and the battalion stood down.

On 1 March 1994, 3d Light Armored Infantry Battalion was re-designated as 3d Light Armored Reconnaissance (LAR) Battalion. The battalion also participated in counter-drug operations in support of Joint Task Force 6 in Arizona throughout 1994. It was during the early 1990s that the battalion's nickname and radio call sign became "Wolfpack". 3d LAR Battalion also continued to support the 1st Marine Division's Unit Deployment Program requirement by rotating an LAR company to Okinawa, Japan every six months.

In December 1998, Company A, 2nd Platoon participated in Operation Desert Fox while attached to Battalion Landing Team (BLT) 2/4 31st Marine Expeditionary Unit (MEU). Operation Desert Fox was a major coalition air campaign launched against Iraq for failing to comply with U.N. Security Resolutions. During this operation, BLT 2/4 established defensive positions in Kuwait, along Mutla Ridge, to deter a potential counter offensive by Iraq.

=== Global war on terror ===
==== Operation Iraqi Freedom ====
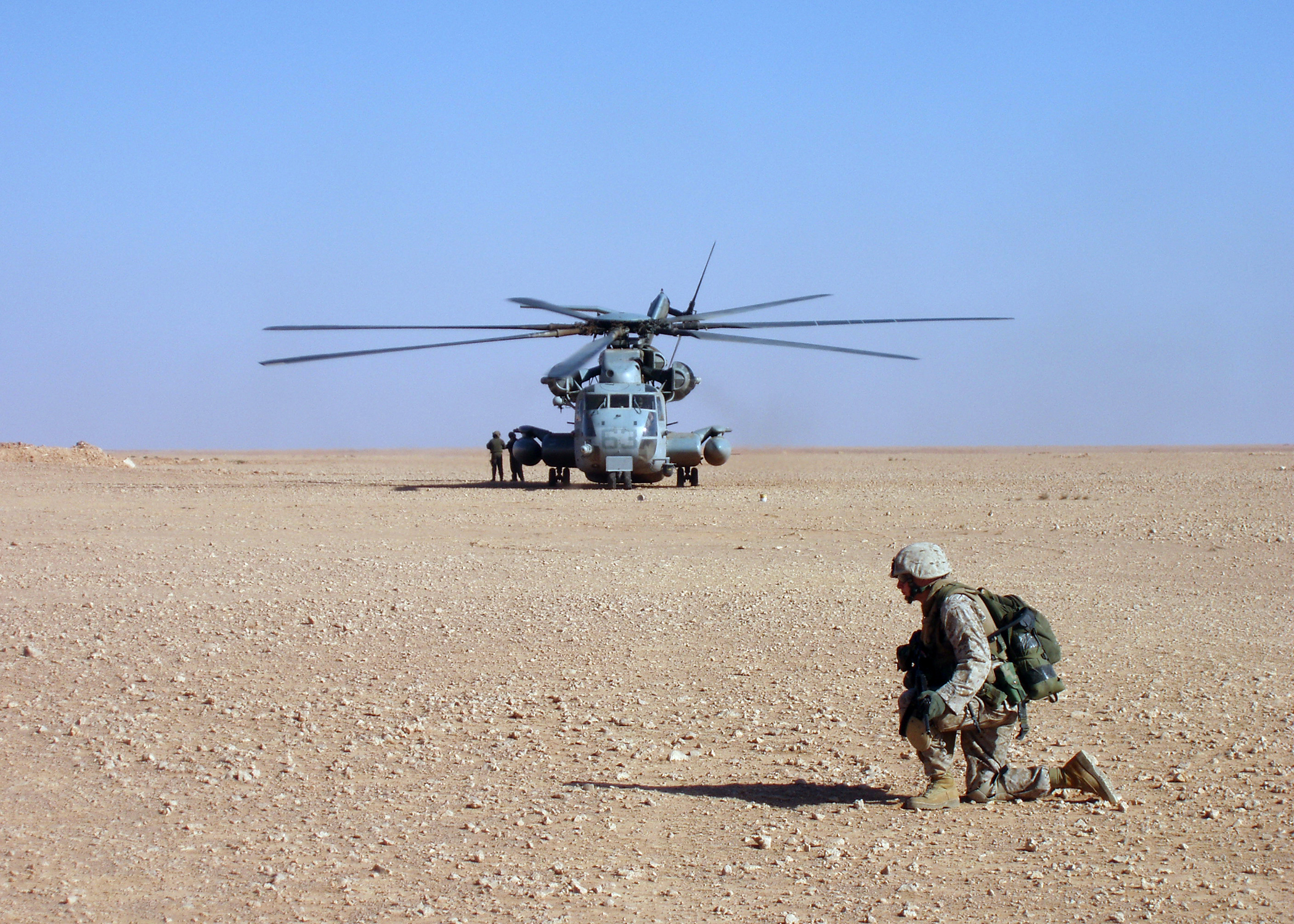
A Marine provides security near Ar Rutbah, Iraq (2004)

In late January through February 2003, the battalion, with the exception of Company C (on unit deployment in Okinawa), deployed with the 1st Marine Division to Kuwait in support of Operation Enduring Freedom. Upon arrival, the battalion attached Company B, 4th LAR Battalion, which was subsequently re-designated as Company E. On 21 March, 3d LAR Battalion and its attachments crossed into Iraq with the beginning of Operation Iraqi Freedom, attacking into the Rumaylah oil fields. The Wolfpack, along with 1st Light Armored Reconnaissance Battalion, led the division's lightning attack north, passing through Task Force Tarawa 56 hours after attacking into Iraq, crossing the Euphrates, and continuing to attack north along Highway 1. On 23 March 2003, while advancing hundreds of kilometers in front of the division to seize a bridge over the Tigris River, the battalion uncovered a night ambush by dozens of Iraqi irregular forces known as the Fedeyeen. This was the first major and only battalion-level engagement of the war which resulted in several dozen enemy killed in action and the destruction of Iraqi armor forces attempting to maneuver south against the division. From the afternoon of 24 March until 1 April, the battalion was attached to Regimental Combat Team 5.

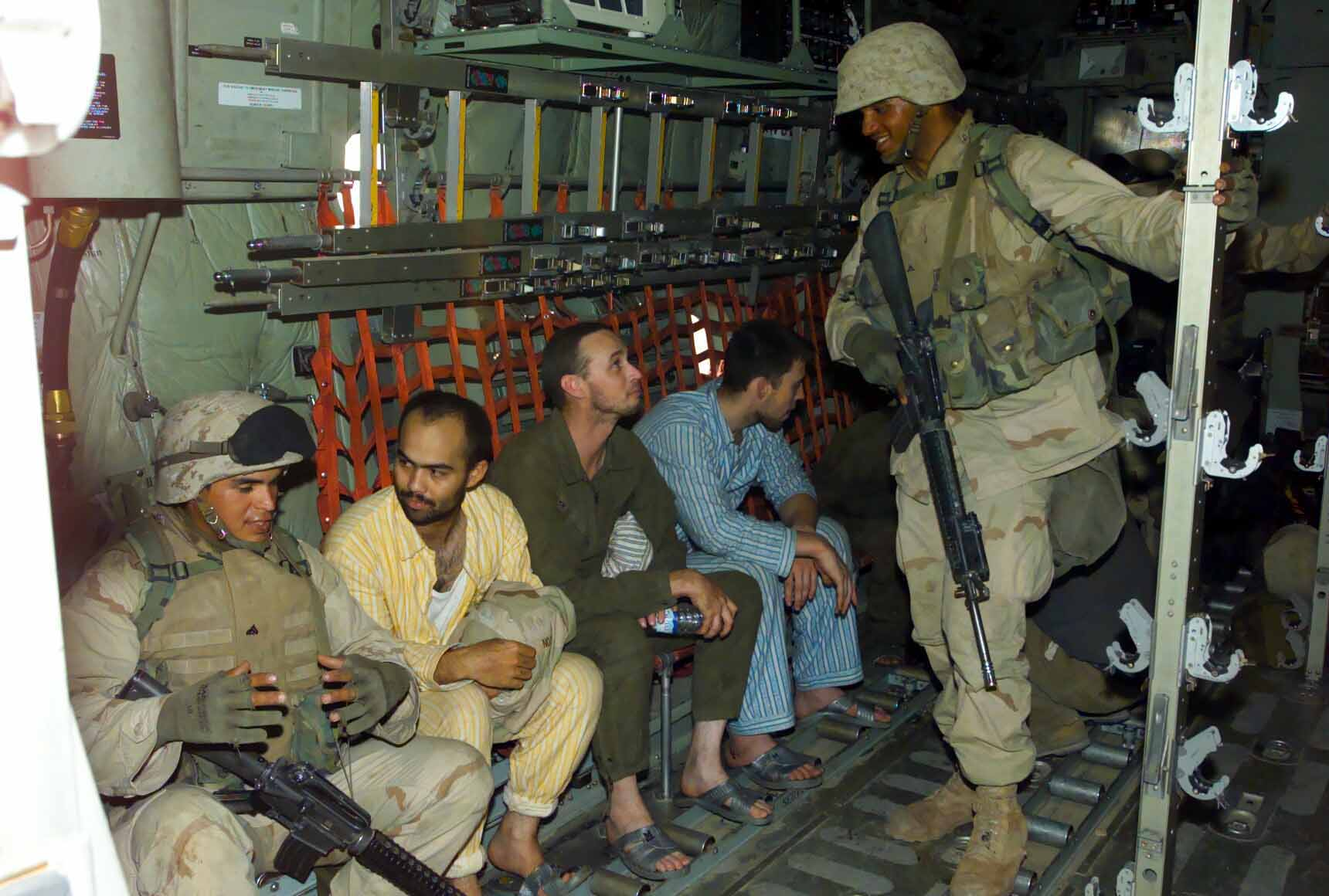
Marines talk with rescued American POWs on a C-130 Hercules.

On 31 March, the battalion attacked north as part of Regimental Combat Team 5 and secured the northern portion of Hantush Airfield. On 10 April, the battalion was tasked to provide a headquarters and two companies to Task Force Tripoli. This ad hoc task force, composed of elements of 1st, 2nd and 3rd Light Armored Reconnaissance Battalions, as well as G/2/23 and TOW plt, 1st Tank Battalion, and commanded by the assistant Division commander, continued to attack north towards Tikrit. The remainder of Task Force Wolfpack, Company B and approximately half of H&S Company, as well as the Rear Command Post element, remained outside Baghdad conducting stabilization operations while attached to 3rd Assault Amphibian Battalion.

In its advance north towards Tikrit, the element of the battalion attached to Task Force Tripoli made national headlines in the town of Samarra on 13 April when members of Company D rescued 7 American servicemen who had been taken prisoner earlier in the conflict. The rescued prisoners included two Army helicopter pilots and Shoshanna Johnson, a soldier from the same unit as Jessica Lynch. An image from this moment is captured in the "Operation Iraqi Freedom" mural on a building in 29 Palms. The battalion reformed in Ad Diwaniyah on 21 April. By mid-June, the entire battalion had redeployed to Twenty-nine Palms, with the last elements of the division following in September. The battalion suffered two non-combat deaths, no killed in action, and nine wounded in action during this deployment.

==== Operation Iraqi Freedom II ====
In November 2003, the battalion was given a warning order to prepare to redeploy in August to Iraq in support of the division's resumption of support and stability operations in Al Anbar Governorate. The battalion was ordered to deploy in August 2004 for a seven-month period. 3rd LAR conducted a relief in place with 1st Light Armored Reconnaissance Battalion at Korean Village, 35 miles (56 km) west of the city of Ar Rutbah, and fell under Regimental Combat Team 7. During the early part of the deployment, Company D operated out of Al-Qa'im, north of the Euphrates River and along the Syrian border, while the remainder of the battalion operated out of Korean Village.

Beginning 7 November 2004 Task Force Wolfpack, with a company attachment of Bradley Fighting Vehicles as the main effort, from the U.S. Army's,1st Battalion 9th Infantry Regiment (MANCHU) 2nd Brigade Combat Team (2BCT), 2nd Infantry Division, along with Company C and parts of Company A participated in Operation Phantom Fury, the division's operation to retake Fallujah. 1st Battalion 9th Infantry Regiment (MANCHU) and Task Force Wolfpack's primary mission was to attack and seize three key objectives on the Fallujah Peninsula—the North and South Bridges and the Fallujah Hospital. Task Force Wolfpack suffered one killed in action and sixty-two wounded in action during this battle. During this time, Company D was attached to 1st Battalion, 23rd Marines and operated near the cities of Hit and Haditha securing the main supply routes and patrolling known insurgent areas.

In late November, Task Force Wolfpack departed the Fallujah peninsula and was attached to the U.S. Army's 2nd Brigade Combat Team (2BCT), 2nd Infantry Division 1st Battalion 9th Infantry Regiment (MANCHU)in Ramadi and supported the 2005 Iraqi national and provincial elections in conjunction with the 1st Battalion 9th Infantry Regiment (MANCHU). Upon completion of these operations in early March, Task Force Wolfpack returned to Korean Village where the battalion reformed and subsequently conducted a relief in place with 2nd Light Armored Reconnaissance Battalion. The battalion redeployed to the United States in early April 2005 and began preparations to redeploy to Iraq the following year. The only other time an Army unit had been under a Marine command was during World War I when this very same 2nd Infantry Division was created on 21 September 1917 in France, U.S. Army and Marine infantry from various regiments were combined to form the 2nd Infantry Division, one of the first leaders was Major General John A. Lejeune for whom Camp Lejeune is named after.

==== Operation Iraqi Freedom 05–07 ====
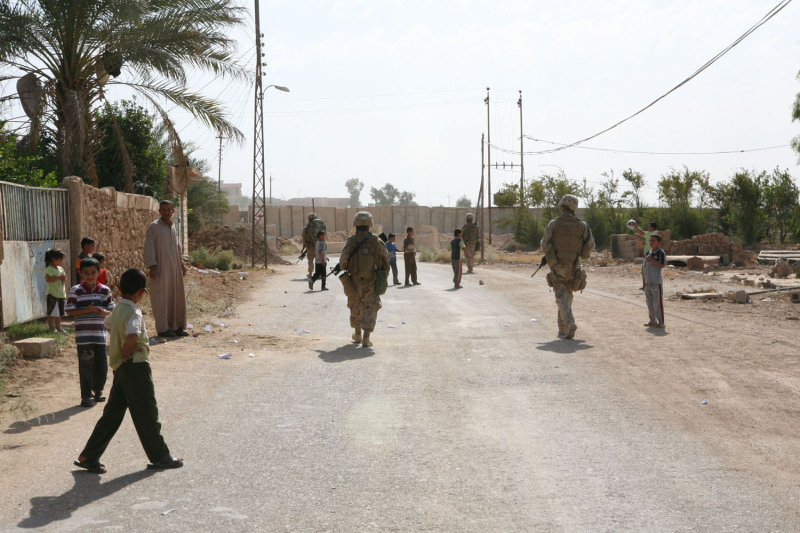
Scouts from 3rd LAR patrol the streets of Anah, Iraq (2006).

In March 2006, 3rd LAR deployed in support of OIF 05–07.1 and subsequently became Task Force WOLFPACK by attaching C/1/10 as a provisional infantry company, one HET detachment and one CAG detachment. Immediately upon arrival, Task Force WOLFPACK detached Company D to RCT-5 in Fallujah to reinforce this AO in order to support decisive operations in and around Baghdad, Iraq. In June 2006, Task Force WOLFPACK received Company D back from RCT-5 and began conducting more aggressive Counter Insurgency (COIN) operations in and around Ar Rutbah, Iraq.

In July 2006, Task Force WOLFPACK was tasked with splitting the battalion by providing a headquarters and maneuver capability to operate near Rawah, Iraq. Task Force Rutbah, which consisted of Company A, 3d LAR, C/1/10 and one half of Headquarters and Service Company (-), 3d LAR continued to conduct counter-insurgency operations in and around Ar Rutbah, Iraq. Task Force Rawah, consisting of one half of Headquarters and Service Company (-) (REIN), 3d LAR and Company D, 3d LAR, conducted a RIP with 4-14 CAV and subsequently began COIN operations in and around Rawah and Anah, Iraq. In September 2006, Task Force Rutbah and Task Force Rawah conducted a RIP with 2d LAR in both areas of operation. By early October 2006, the battalion had redeployed to Twentynine Palms, CA.

==== Operation Iraqi Freedom 06–08 ====
In September 2007, 3rd LAR deployed again to Iraq returning to AO Rutbah to conduct COIN operations. They returned to 29 Palms in April 2008.

In March 2009, 3rd LAR deployed yet again to Iraq to take part in counter insurgency operations operating from Sahl Sinjar Air Base in Nineveh Governorate. They returned to the states in September 2009.

==== Operation Enduring Freedom 2010–present ====
In January 2010, 3rd LAR began training for their inaugural deployment to Afghanistan.

In November 2010, 3rd LAR deployed to Helmand Province, Afghanistan for the first time, replacing 1st LAR in support of the border security efforts operating out of Combat Out Post (COP) Payne. The following year, they were relieved by 2nd LAR in late May 2011

In April 2012, 3rd LAR deployed again to Helmand Province. In October 2012, they returned to the states with their homecoming hosted on Del Valle Field, Twentynine Palms, California

On 19 & 20 June, 3rd LAR took part in the marine corps annual live fire exercise on their home base at 29 Palms

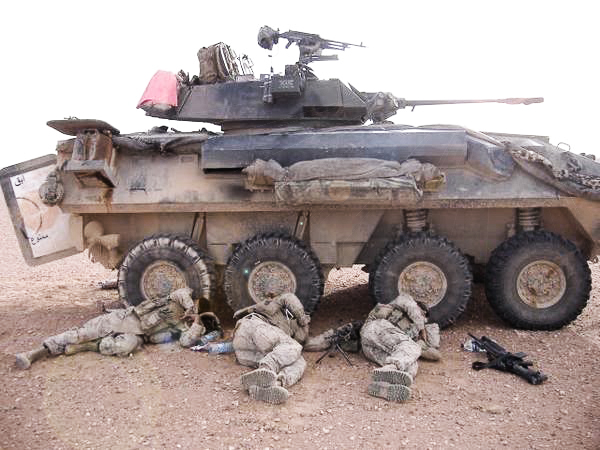
Scouts napping after a patrol

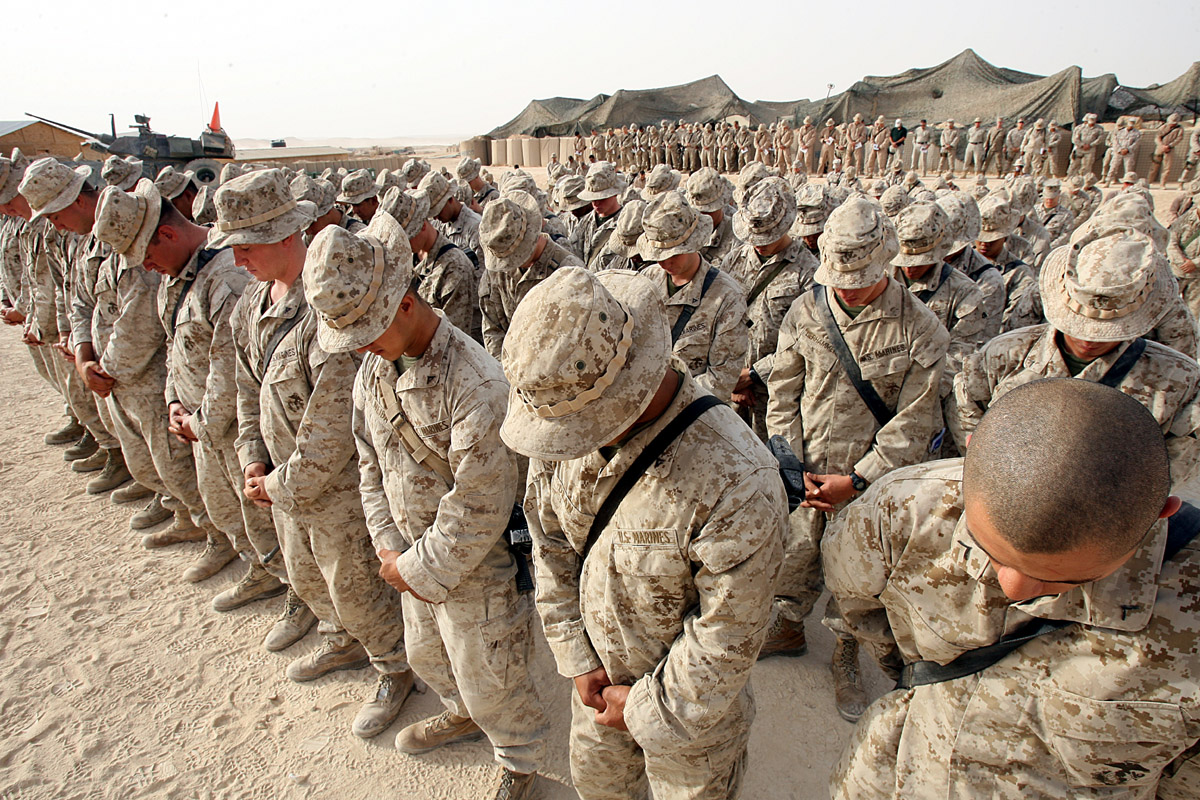
Marines of 3rd LAR pray during a memorial service for their fallen brothers

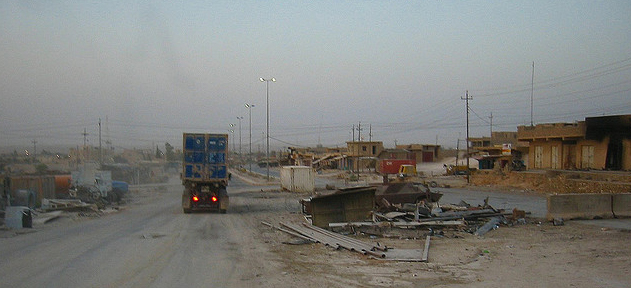
Street view of Rawah, Iraq (2006)

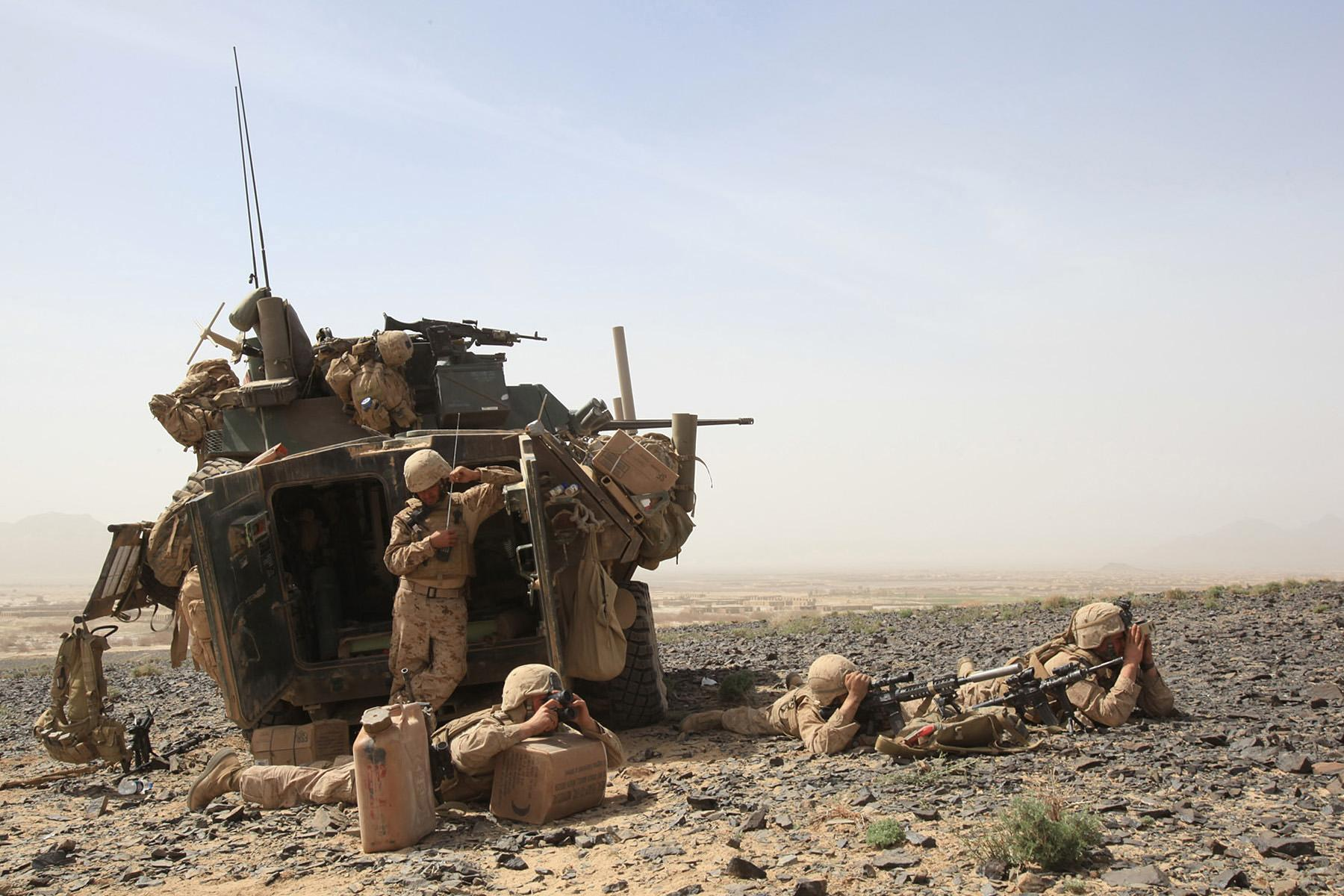
3rd LAR strikes key insurgent border hub during Operation Raw Hide II in Helmand Province, Afghanistan (2011)

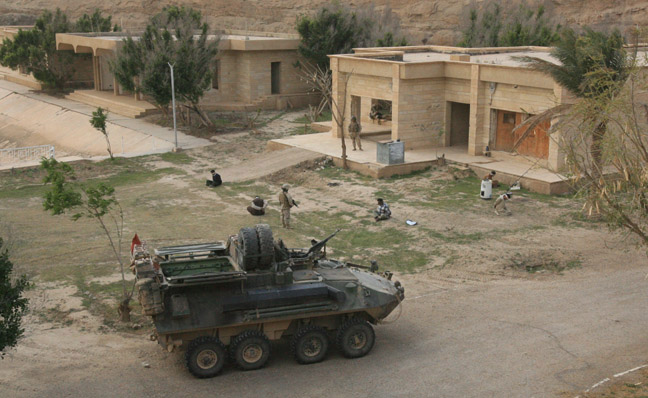
Marines from D Company patrol north of Fallujah in April 2006

== See also ==
- List of United States Marine Corps battalions
- Organization of the United States Marine Corps
