= Task Force Tripoli =

- Active: April - May 2003
- Country: United States of America
- Branch: United States Marine Corps
- Type: Special-purpose MAGTF
- Part of: 1st Marine Division; I Marine Expeditionary Force
- Engagements: Operation Iraqi Freedom

Commanders
- Current commander: BGen John F. Kelly

Task Force Tripoli (TFT) was a United States Marine Corps air-ground task force formed after the fall of Baghdad during the 2003 invasion of Iraq. This ad-hoc formation was tasked with continuing the attack north to secure the city of Tikrit. It was commanded by Brigadier General John F. Kelly, then Assistant Division Commander of the 1st Marine Division. Within 12 hours of tasking, the Marines were able to put together a convoy of 600 vehicles and 4,000 troops for the mission. The unit was composited on April 12, 2003, in a staging area east of Baghdad and had secured Tikrit by April 15. It was the first time that the Marine Corps ever employed an entire LAV regiment and marked the farthest inland that Marine Forces had ever advanced.

== Order of Battle ==
Task Force units included:

- 1st Marine Division Jump Headquarters
- 1st Light Armored Reconnaissance Battalion
- 2nd Light Armored Reconnaissance Battalion
- 3rd Light Armored Reconnaissance Battalion,
- 2nd Battalion 23rd Marines - G Company and a CAAT section from Weapons Company
- 5th Battalion 11th Marines
- Direct Air Support Center (Fwd) from Marine Air Support Squadron 3
- Detachment from Combat Service Support Battalion-10.
- Detachment of United States Navy SEALs

== Background ==
After the fall of Baghdad on April 10, US political leaders still wanted to locate Saddam Hussein who they believed had fled to his hometown. There was also a desire to tamp down the Kurds from aggressively seizing Iraqi Lands. The 4th Infantry Division was not due to arrive in Tikrit for another 7–10 days but US leaders wanted a presence there as soon as possible. I MEF leadership was asked if the Marines could take on the mission and responded yes. At the time it was believed that there were approximately 2000 Iraqi Army troops from the Republican Guard's Adnan Division in Tikrit.

The Task Force's name was in honor of the Marines that fought in the Battle of Derna (1805). These Marines, led by First Lieutenant Presley O'Bannon, conducted a 521-mile (839-km) forced march through the North African desert from Alexandria, Egypt, to the eastern port city of Derna, Libya, and defeated a much larger force of Ottoman troops during the First Barbary War.

== History ==
=== Initial invasion ===
The Marines set out on the evening of 12 April and did not make an effort to secure their lines of communication. The task force was going to depend on the 3d Marine Aircraft Wing (3d MAW) and follow on forces from 1st Force Service Support Group to keep it resupplied. One of the trickiest parts of the movement north was having to get the entire column of vehicles across the Tigris River over a single decrepit bridge in the town of Al Swash. The bridge had only recently been secured by Marines from Golf Company, 2nd Battalion, 5th Marines and could only hold one vehicle at a time. After the entire convoy had made its way across the river, the decision was made to continue attacking north and keep the advance going through the night.

On April 13, Marines from 3d LAR were tipped off by Iraqi Police about the presence of American prisoners of war (POW) in the area. A lieutenant from the unit handed a commercial GPS receiver to an Iraqi Policeman who used it to acquire an accurate location of the prisoners. The Marines quickly made their way to the location and rescued seven Americans in Samarra. Five of the POWs were members of the 507th Maintenance Company that had been ambushed early in the war in An Nasiriyah and the other two were captured Apache pilots. The POWs were immediately flown south by CH-46 Sea Knights from HMM-165 to An Numaniyah where they were transferred to a waiting KC-130 Hercules from VMGR-452 which then flew them to Kuwait International Airport.

As 3d LAR was rescuing Americans in Samarra, 2d LAR was pushing north of Tikrit to seize Al Sahra Airfield and establish a blocking position while 1st LAR pushed up the highway from the south into the city. Approximately 1 km before entering the city, task force Marines destroyed five Iraqi tanks and killed at least 15 Iraqi soldiers while fighting through a fedayeen ambush. As the Marine ground forces prepared to enter the city, Marines from Marine Wing Support Group 37 and Marine Air Control Group 38 established a Forward arming and refuelling point (FARP) at Tikrit South Air Base. Once established, this FARP supported Marine Corps aircraft from Marine Aircraft Group 29 (MAG-29) in support of the task force.

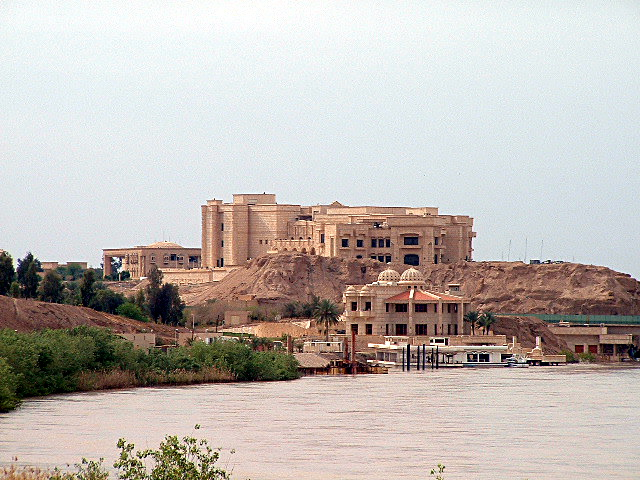
Saddam Hussein's new palace along the banks of the Tigris where Task Force Tripoli's headquarters was established after seizing Tikrit.

Upon entering Tikrit, Task Force Tripoli headquarters was established at Saddam's palace compound overlooking the Tigris River. The Marines began actively patrolling throughout Tikrit. On April 15, Gen Kelly met with local Sheikhs from the surrounding area for the first time where he stated that Marines would provide local security in return for assistance in helping to find any foreign fighters or regime loyalists still in the area. This was the first of many meetings between the two sides. One of the outcomes from these meetings was the Marines being able to secure the city of Baiji about 25 miles north of Tikrit. From April 19–21 the task force conducted a relief in place with the U.S. Army's 4th Infantry Division led by Major General Raymond T. Odierno. On April 21, the Task Force drove south to link up with the rest of the 1st Marine Division at Al Diwaniyah.

=== Security Operations ===
On May 2, the task force was reestablished and began preparations to move south to the Iraqi-Saudi border and set into a screen line to prevent Wahabi infiltrators from moving north into Iraq. On May 3, each LAR battalion independently left the 1st Marine Division's assembly area in Al Diwaniyah and moved out to their individual staging areas. On May 4, the task force occupied the screen line just north of the border. On May 5, the task force was recalled due to a lack of activity on the border and proceeded to return to Al Diwaniyah.

== See also ==
- List of United States Marine Corps battalions
- History of the United States Marine Corps
