= Wade Zirkle =

American veteran activist

- Born: Wade Zirkle
- Military career
- Allegiance: United States of America
- Branch: United States Marine Corps
- Commands: 2nd Light Armored Reconnaissance Battalion; 2nd Battalion, 1st Marines
- Conflicts: Iraq War
- Awards: Purple Heart

Wade Zirkle is a decorated American military veteran of the Iraq War. He is the founder and former executive director of the Vets For Freedom Action Fund, a political action committee whose stated mission is to "help candidates-mostly combat veterans-who believe in achieving success in Iraq, Afghanistan, and the overall war on terrorism, get elected to the United States Congress and other Federal positions".

== Biography ==
Zirkle is a managing partner of the financial services firm StrongPoint Capital, LLC, in Woodstock, Virginia. He previously worked for Lehman Brothers Asset Management and was on Wall Street during the 2008 financial crisis. Originally from Edinburg, Virginia, Zirkle graduated from the University of South Carolina with a Bachelor of Arts in political science in 2000.

Zirkle served two combat tours in Iraq as a U.S. Marine Corps infantry officer, first as a Light Armored Vehicle platoon commander with the 2nd Light Armored Reconnaissance Battalion during the invasion of 2003, and then as a rifle platoon commander with the 2nd Battalion 1st Marines in the First Battle of Fallujah in 2004. During his second deployment to Iraq, he was badly burned as a result of an insurgent suicide bomb attack on a convoy he was in. He is a recipient of the Purple Heart Medal.

He returned to Iraq for the third time as a civilian freelance journalist in 2006, where he was embedded with the Iraqi Army in Ramadi. He was the first American journalist to report that the new American counter-insurgency strategy being implemented in Anbar Province was working, and later wrote editorials in The Philadelphia Inquirer and The Weekly Standard claiming the "oilspot strategy" was seeing signs of success in Iraq. It was not until three months later, that the Los Angeles Times was the next newspaper to report such news, as it stated "tribal leaders in Anbar province were turning against the Al Qaeda resistance". Eleven months after Zirkle's initial report, the New York Times said that Anbar was "undergoing a surprising transformation". In 2009 Zirkle wrote for the Fox News Channel while he was embedded with U.S. troops and Afghan commandos on the Pakistan-Afghanistan border.

In October 2006, the CBS Evening News was criticized for giving free airtime to Zirkle to promote a force increase in Iraq of 30,000 troops. Four months later, President George W. Bush announced the increase of 24,000 troops.

== Articles by Wade Zirkle ==
- A Fifth Star for General Petreaus; by Pete Hegseth and Wade Zirkle; The Wall Street Journal
- U.S. Probes Whether Afghan Forces Colluded With Taliban in Deadly Attack; by Wade Zirkle; Fox News
- Troops in Support of the War; by Wade Zirkle, The Washington Post
