= Vets For Freedom =

American political advocacy organization

- Formation: 2006
- Type: 501(c)(4) organization
- Tax ID no.: 20-3949872
- Headquarters: San Francisco, CA
- Key people: Pete Hegseth; Joel Arends; Wade Zirkle; David Bellavia; Knox Nunnally; Mark Seavey; Joe Dan Worley
- Website: "Vets For Freedom". www.vetsforfreedom.org. Archived from the original on February 21, 2006.; University of San Francisco, MA in Public Leadership program, Washington, D.C.

Vets for Freedom is an American political advocacy organization founded in 2006 by veterans of the Iraq and Afghan wars, among others, Wade Zirkle, David Bellavia, and Owen West, with connections to Republican Party leaders. The group was initially founded as a 527 group.

During the 2006 election, the group supported Senator Joseph Lieberman, who ran for reelection as an independent after losing the Democratic nomination. The group spent about $4.1 million on campaign ads in the 2008 election, mostly on ads promoting the "surge" of U.S. troops in the Iraq War in 2007.

== Activities ==
=== 2006 campaign ===
On 9 August 2006, the then-named Vets for Freedom Action Fund sent solicitation letters from Wade Zirkle that directly aligned the organization with the George W. Bush White House.

Vets for Freedom sponsored a full-page political ad in the Hartford Courant on August 14, 2006 endorsing Democratic US senator Joe Lieberman and embarked on a television advertising campaign in Connecticut supportive of his reelection. Additionally, they financed an ad campaign in Georgia to support embattled Democratic congressman Jim Marshall in 2006. He won by the smallest margin of any Democratic congressman that year.

In 2007, Pete Hegseth became president of Vets For Freedom, and when its finances became bleak, the donors arranged a merger that took over management, and Hegseth left in 2012.

=== 2008 campaign ===
In October 2008, Vets for Freedom paid for a multimillion-dollar ad campaign criticizing the presidential candidacy of Senator Barack Obama. The group accuses the Democratic presidential nominee of caring more about his campaign than about troops in Iraq and Afghanistan. Previously, Vets for Freedom aired other advertisements criticizing Senator Obama's position on the Iraq War.

On October 10, 2008, Vets for Freedom released a Senate Analysis scorecard. In the VFF scorecard, every single Democratic senator was given the lowest possible grade of F. Three Republican senators were graded F, and 38 Republican senators received the grade of A+. VFF gave Senator Obama the score of 0.5%, or second lowest, and gave his running mate Senator Joe Biden the score of 0.0%, tying him for last place with Senator Ted Kennedy of Massachusetts. John McCain received a score of 93.5% and the grade of A−.

=== 2010 campaign ===
In a campaign called "Operation 10-in-10," Vets for Freedom backed 10 Republican congressional candidates in the 2010 congressional elections. (Italicized denotes successful run.) The Iraq and Afghanistan veterans running for office included Allen West (FL-22), Steve Stivers (OH-15), Jonathan Paton (AZ-8), Ilario Pantano (NC-7), Adam Kinzinger (IL-11), Joe Heck (NV-3), Chris Gibson (NY-20), Brian Rooney (MI-7), Kevin Calvey (OK-5), and Tim Griffin (AR-2).

== Political connections ==
- In 2006 Vets for Freedom supported three candidates for office: Sen. Joe Lieberman (I-CT), Rep. Jim Marshall (D-GA), and Sen. Jim Talent (R-MO.)
- As of May 2008, Vets for Freedom was supporting five candidates for the House of Representatives, all of them Republicans who have served in the armed forces.
- Zirkle was a regional field director for Republican Jerry Kilgore's unsuccessful 2005 campaign for governor of Virginia.
- A "key Vets for Freedom adviser is Bill Andresen, a Democrat and former chief of staff to embattled Sen. Joseph I. Lieberman of Connecticut."
- Among the Vets for Freedom advisors are Weekly Standard Editor Bill Kristol and former Iraqi Coalition Provisional Spokesman Dan Senor.

== Funding ==
VFF applied for status as a tax-exempt nonprofit organization, but as of June 2006, the application was not approved. Zirkle said that "Initial funding came from family members and friends." It is now a 501(c)4 nonprofit organization.

The National Journal reported that casino magnate Sheldon Adelson, the third-richest man in America, had made a significant donation to Vets For Freedom.

== See also ==
- VoteVets.org
