= VSA =

VSA may refer to:

== Places ==
- Villahermosa International Airport (IATA: VSA), Mexico

== Organizations ==
- VSA (Kennedy Center), formerly known as Very Special Arts, a U.S.-based international organization focusing on arts education for disabled people
- VSA (charity), a Scottish social care charity
- Veterans for a Secure America, an American political coalition
- Veterans for a Strong America, an American political action committee
- Victorian Speleological Association, an Australian caving organization
- Victoria Shanghai Academy, a Hong Kong international school
- Vietnamese Student Association, a union for Vietnamese-Americans to interact with one another
- The Violin Society of America, an American organization concerning string instruments
- Volunteer Service Abroad, a New Zealand volunteering agency

== Science and technology ==
- Vacuum swing adsorption, a gas separation technology
- Van der Waals surface
- Vector signal analyser
- Vehicle Service Agreement, an extended warranty for a motor vehicle
- Vehicle Stability Assist, technology that improves a vehicle's stability
- Vendor-specific attributes, in the RADIUS networking protocol
- Very Small Array, a radio telescope
- Viable systems approach, a systems theory
- vSphere Storage Appliance
- Voice stress analysis, a means of measuring stress responses in the human voice
