= Armoured reconnaissance =

Terrestrial reconnaissance using armoured vehicles

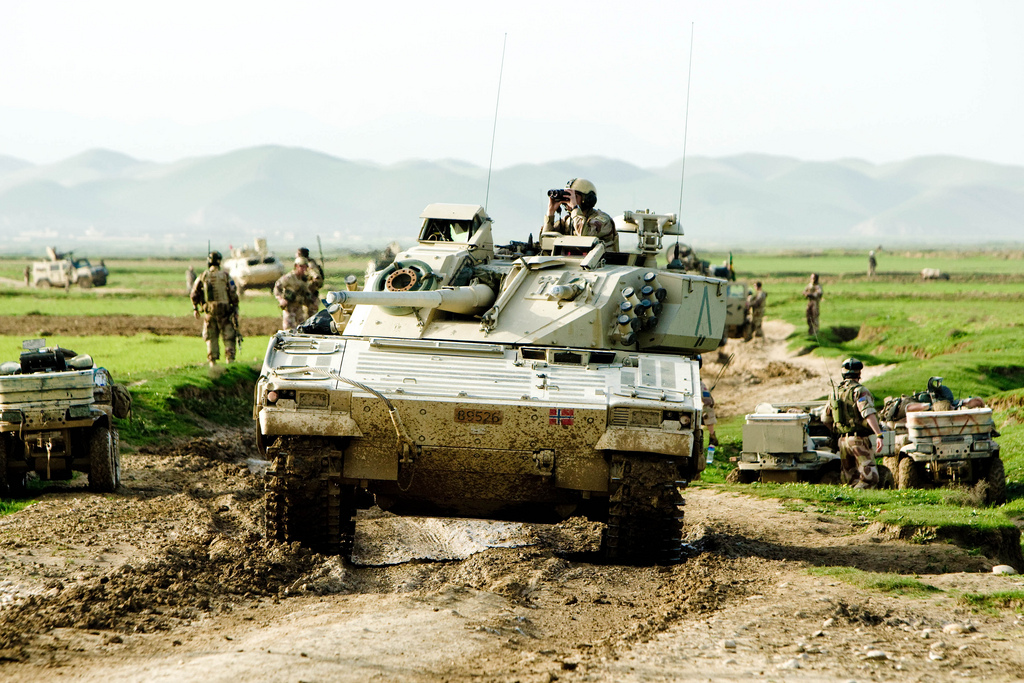
A CV90 armoured reconnaissance vehicle of the Norwegian Army on patrol in Afghanistan

Armoured reconnaissance also Combat reconnaissance vehicle is the combination of terrestrial reconnaissance with armoured warfare by soldiers using tanks and wheeled or tracked armoured reconnaissance vehicles. While the mission of reconnaissance is to gather intelligence about the enemy with the use of reconnaissance vehicles, armoured reconnaissance adds the ability to fight for information, and to have an effect on and to shape the enemy through the performance of traditional armoured tasks.

Whereas ordinary scouts are expected to either infiltrate the enemy lines by avoiding contact, or to retreat in the face of anything more than enemy scouting parties, an armoured reconnaissance team is expected to be able to break through enemy lines by overwhelming forward screening elements. Armoured reconnaissance units are expected to reconnaissance-in-force, put enemy scouting units to flight, force screens to retreat, work to disrupt both logistics and communication lines, and force their way deep enough behind enemy lines to reconnoiter the main enemy force deployments and encampments. Armoured reconnaissance vehicles and tactics are capable of fending off any light advance unit the enemy can field, and is theoretically on equal terms with the armoured main elements of the enemy force.

== Armoured reconnaissance units by country ==
=== Australia ===
In the Australian Army the main reconnaissance vehicle is the ASLAV armoured scout car, which is the Australian version of the LAV 25. The Army Reserve regiments use the Light Cavalry Patrol Vehicle, aka the Regional Force Surveillance Vehicle, which is a variant of the Land Rover Perentie.

Armoured reconnaissance/cavalry regiments in the Australian Army

Regular

1. 1st Armoured Regiment
2. 2nd Cavalry Regiment
3. 2nd/14th Light Horse Regiment (Queensland Mounted Infantry)

Reserve

1. 1st/15th Royal New South Wales Lancers
2. 3rd/9th Light Horse (South Australian Mounted Rifles)
3. 4th/19th Prince of Wales's Light Horse
4. 10th Light Horse Regiment

=== Belgium ===
The Belgian Army has two armoured reconnaissance regiments

1. 1st Regiment Mounted Rifles – Guides
2. 2nd/4th Regiment Mounted Rifles

=== Canada ===
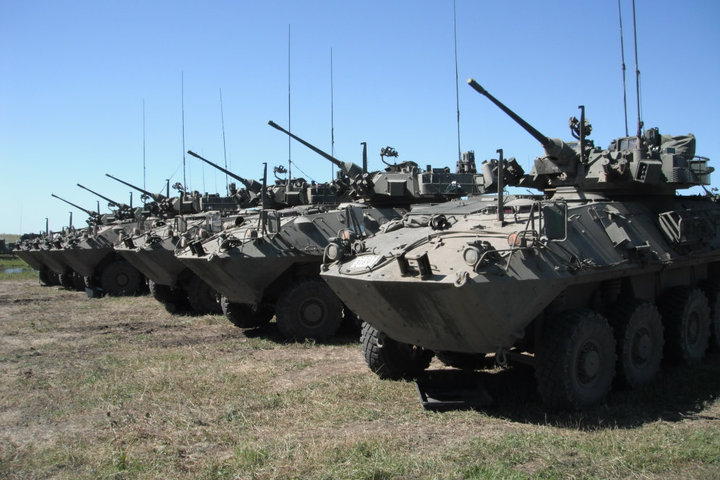
Coyote Reconnaissance Vehicles from the 12^{e} Régiment blindé du Canada

In the Canadian Army, formation reconnaissance is normally primarily conducted by divisional armoured regiments that gather and fight for information, as well as performing more traditional armour tasks such as seizing, penetrating, and exploiting. There has not been a divisional armoured reconnaissance regiment in Canada since 1992. While there are no armoured reconnaissance regiments in the Regular Force in the present day, each Regular Force armoured regiment does provide a formation armoured reconnaissance squadron equipped with armoured cars to each mechanised brigade. Lord Strathcona's Horse (Royal Canadians) is a tank-heavy regiment with two squadrons of tanks and one squadron of armoured cars, while both the Royal Canadian Dragoons and the 12^{e} Régiment blindé du Canada are armoured car-heavy regiments, with three armoured car squadrons each and one shared tank squadron.

Although the Reserve Force regiments continue to be known as armoured reconnaissance regiments, since the loss of the medium tank from their organisation, they have in reality only been employed in the light reconnaissance (scout) role.

Armoured reconnaissance regiments in the Reserve Force.

1. The Governor General's Horse Guards
2. The Halifax Rifles (RCAC)
3. 8th Canadian Hussars (Princess Louise's)
4. The Ontario Regiment (RCAC)
5. The Queen's York Rangers (1st American Regiment) (RCAC)
6. Sherbrooke Hussars
7. 12^{e} Régiment blindé du Canada (Milice)
8. 1st Hussars
9. The Prince Edward Island Regiment (RCAC)
10. The Royal Canadian Hussars (Montreal)
11. The British Columbia Regiment (Duke of Connaught's Own)
12. The South Alberta Light Horse
13. The Saskatchewan Dragoons
14. The King's Own Calgary Regiment (RCAC)
15. The British Columbia Dragoons
16. The Fort Garry Horse
17. Le Régiment de Hull (RCAC)
18. The Windsor Regiment (RCAC)

=== Denmark ===
There is only one armoured reconnaissance battalion in the Danish army.

1. 3rd Battalion, (III/GHR) Guard Hussar Regiment (Gardehusarregimentet)

The following Danish reconnaissance units were disbanded after the Cold War:

1. 5th Battalion, (V/JDR) disband in 2005 (Jutlands Dragoons) Jydske Dragonregiment
2. Recce-Squadron (six M/41DK1 Walker-bulldog), disband in 2000 (Bornholm Guards) Bornholms Værn. On the island of Bornholm

=== Germany ===
In 2005 the reconnaissance units of the German Army were restructured. The former Panzeraufklärungstruppe ("armoured reconnaissance corps"), Fernspähtruppe ("long range reconnaissance corps"), Feldnachrichtentruppe and UAV units of the Artillerietruppe ("artillery corps") haven been combined to the new Heeresaufklärungstruppe ("army reconnaissance corps").

Now the German Army is operating five reconnaissance battalions and five independent companies:

- Armoured Reconnaissance
  - Aufklärungslehrkompanie 90, Munster
  - Aufklärungskompanie 210, Augustdorf
- Long Range Reconnaissance
  - Fernspählehrkompanie 200, Pfullendorf
- Airborne Reconnaissance
  - Luftlandeaufklärungskompanie 260, Zweibrücken
  - Luftlandeaufklärungskompanie 310, Seedorf

Reconnaissance Bataillons:

- Aufklärungslehrbataillon 3, Lüneburg
- Aufklärungsbataillon 6, Eutin
- Aufklärungsbataillon 8, Freyung
- Aufklärungsbataillon 13, Gotha
- Gebirgsaufklärungsbataillon 230, Füssen

Reserve units:

- Aufklärungsbataillon 910, Gotha
- Aufklärungsbataillon 911, Füssen
- Aufklärungsbataillon 912, Lüneburg

Every battalion (except the Aufklärungslehrbataillon 3) is structured in four companies: 1. HQ & Support Company

The first company provides the battalion with communication, maintenance and transport.

2. Armoured Reconnaissance Company

The armoured reconnaissance company operates all the Fennek vehicles of the battalion. They are organized in six platoons each of four vehicles. Two Fennek form a "scout squad" (Spähtrupp).

3. Light Reconnaissance Company

The light reconnaissance company includes three HUMINT platoons (Feldnachrichtenzüge) and one scout platoon equipped with six Dingo.

4. UAV Company

The fourth company operates the two UAV platoons with LunaX and KZO. There is also a radar platoon, equipped with eight Dingo and the BÜR radar system

=== Ghana ===
Ghana's Armoured Reconnaissance Regiment is the oldest armoured unit in the Ghanaian Army. It was formed at the country's independence in 1957 and consists of two squadrons. The regiment has served with distinction in various African peacekeeping missions, and is partly equipped with EE-9 Cascavel and Ratel-90 armoured cars.

1. 1st Ghanaian Armoured Reconnaissance Regiment

=== Kenya ===
The Kenyan Army has a single armoured reconnaissance battalion, equipped mainly with Panhard AML-90 armoured cars.

1. 76 ARB (armoured reconnaissance battalion)

=== Netherlands ===
The Dutch Army has one regiment, the Regiment Huzaren van Boreel which was named after Willem Francois Boreel. The Regiment consists of four squadrons: two squadrons belong to the ISTAR battalion and the other two each belong to one of the two Netherlands Mechanised Brigades. The difference in organisation between the ISTAR squadrons and the brigade squadrons is that the ISTAR squadrons each have a Tactical Air Control Party for Close Air Support and the two brigade squadrons each have an FST section. All squadrons are trained to operate completely independently. They have their own logistical support and all patrols have communication specialists and special forces medics for emergencies. The training and operation procedures of all squadrons are very similar although the ISTAR squadrons focus more on missions not from brigade but from national command. All squadrons have been on combat operations in the south of Afghanistan.

=== New Zealand ===
The New Zealand Army only has one squadron that performs armoured reconnaissance. This is also the only reserve armoured squadron.

1. Queen Alexandra's Mounted Rifles
2. 4th Waikato Mounted Rifles part of 6th Hauraki Battalion Group

=== Norway ===
The Norwegian Army has two armoured reconnaissance squadrons.

1. Tropp 2/ Pansret Oppklarning part of the Cavalry Squadron in the Telemark Battalion
2. Tropp 2/ Pansert Oppklarning part of the Cavalry Squadron in the Panser Battalion

=== Sri Lanka ===
The Sri Lanka Army has five recce regiments attached to the Sri Lanka Armoured Corps.

- 1st Reconnaissance Regiment SLAC
- 3rd Reconnaissance Regiment SLAC
- 5th Reconnaissance Regiment SLAC
- 6th Reconnaissance Regiment SLAC
- 8th Reconnaissance Regiment SLAC

=== South Africa ===
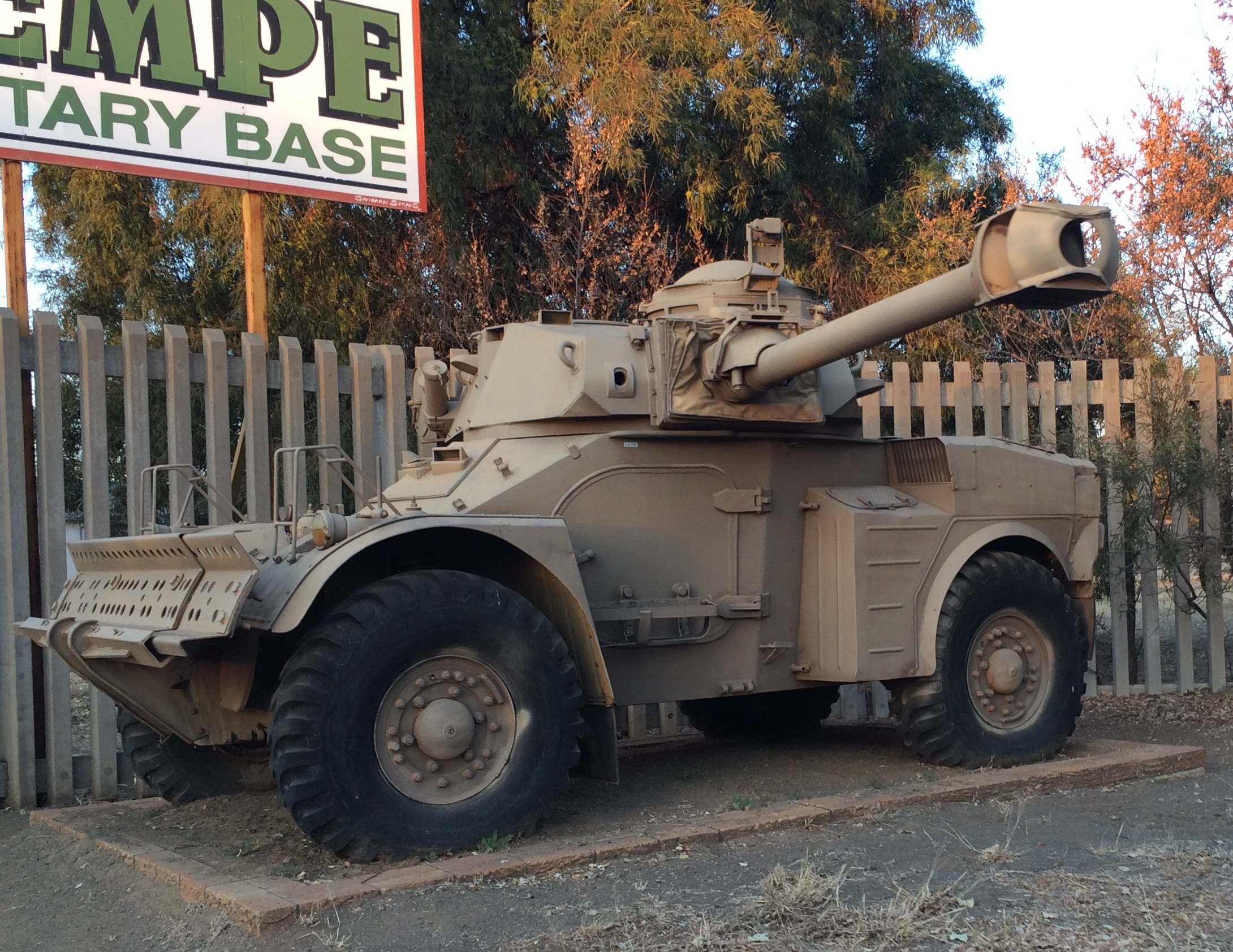
South African Eland-90 armoured reconnaissance vehicle

There is only one dedicated regular force armoured reconnaissance regiment in the South African Army, namely 1 Special Service Battalion and four reserve force regiments, these being: Blaauwberg Armoured Regiment, Johannesburg Light Horse Regiment, Molapo Armour Regiment and Umvoti Mounted Rifles. All of these regiments are considered armoured car units operating Rooikat and Ratel ZT-3s. These units were initially equipped with Marmon–Herrington armoured car and Ferret scout cars following World War II, however owing to the aggressive nature of South African reconnaissance doctrine these lightly armed reconnaissance cars were replaced first by the Eland Mk7 and then by the Rooikat by 1991, which were heavier vehicles equipped with large-calibre cannons.

- Regular Force
  - 1 Special Service Battalion
- Reserve Force
  - Blaauwberg Armoured Regiment
  - Johannesburg Light Horse Regiment
  - Molapo Armour Regiment
  - Umvoti Mounted Rifles

=== United Kingdom ===
In the British Army armoured reconnaissance units carry out "formation reconnaissance" for higher level formations. In the British Army these Formation reconnaissance regiments are usually providing reconnaissance for a division or a heavy brigade. In a large-scale defensive operation, they would delay attacking forces, whilst screening heavier units as they moved to engage the enemy. The regiments are, currently, almost entirely equipped with vehicles of the Combat Vehicle Reconnaissance (Tracked) – CVR(T) – family. Some of the armoured regiments of the British Army are known as formation reconnaissance instead of armoured.

Formation reconnaissance regiments in the British Army

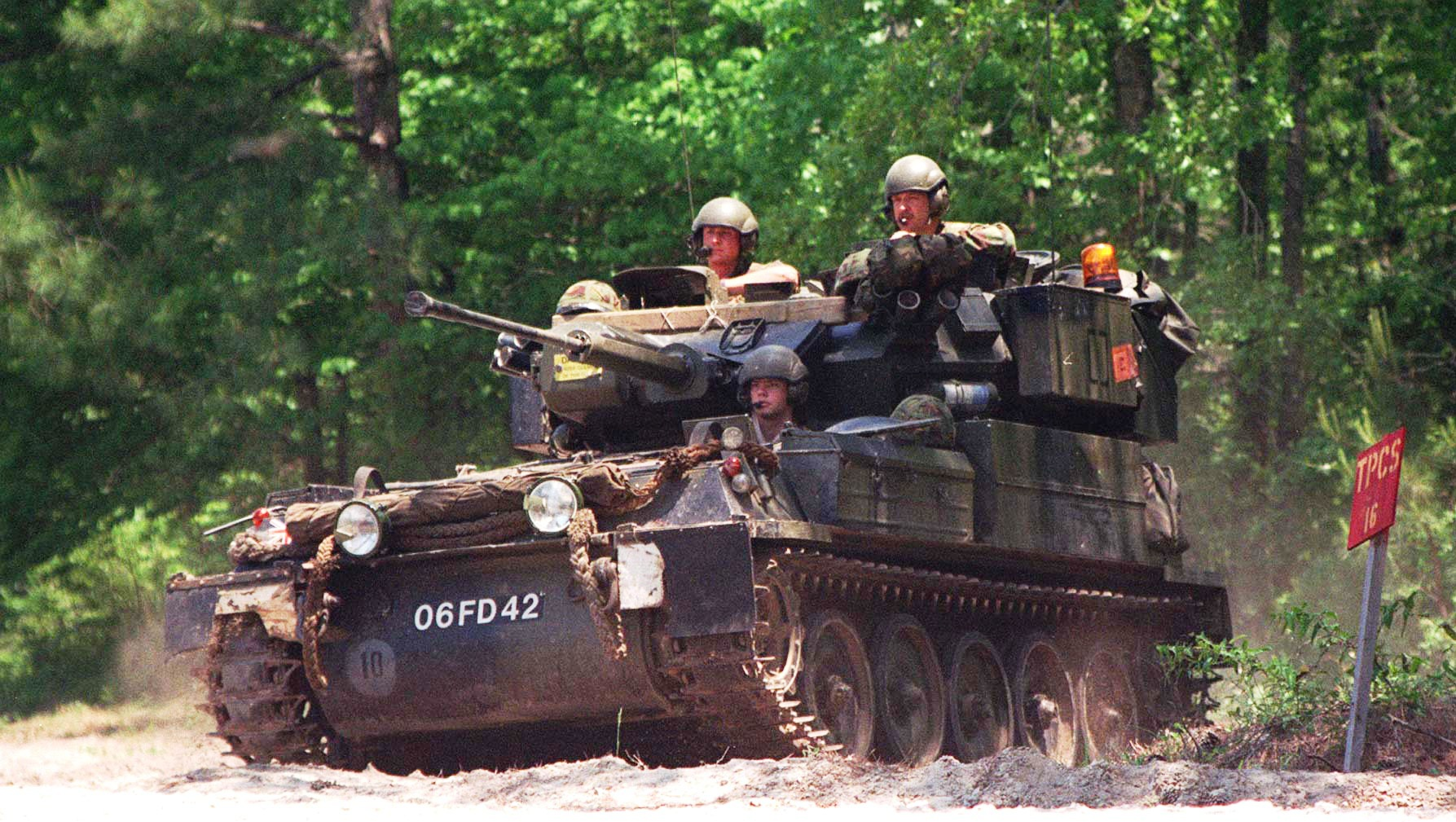
One of the British CVR(T) variants – FV107 Scimitar

- Household Cavalry Regiment
  - The Life Guards
  - The Blues and Royals (Royal Horse Guards and 1st Dragoons)
- Royal Armoured Corps
  - Royal Dragoon Guards
  - Royal Lancers (Queen Elizabeths' Own)
- Army Reserve (formerly Territorial Army)
  - The Royal Yeomanry
  - The Queen's Own Yeomanry
  - Scottish and North Irish Yeomanry

=== United States ===
- Army

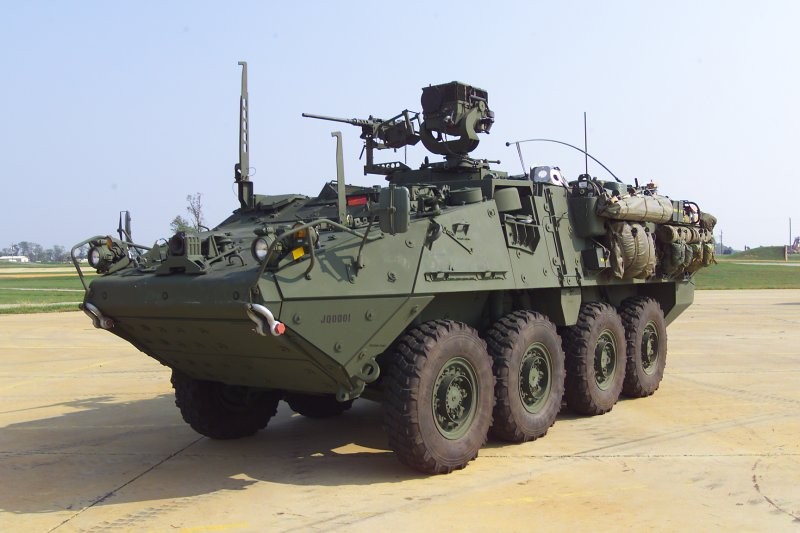
M1127 reconnaissance vehicle

Each brigade combat team (BCT) (there are multiple combat support and combat service support brigades that may or may not have such assets) in the Army has an organic reconnaissance squadron assigned to it. Each heavy brigade combat team has an armoured reconnaissance squadron consisting of three reconnaissance troops and an unmanned aerial vehicle troop. The reconnaissance troops have two reconnaissance platoons with five M1114 HMMWVs and three M3 Cavalry Fighting Vehicles (a variant of the M2 Bradley Fighting Vehicle). Stryker BCTs include a Stryker-vehicle-based reconnaissance squadron. There are more than 30 cavalry reconnaissance squadrons in the US Army.

Incomplete list:

1. US cavalry regiments Cavalry (United States)
2. Cavalry scout – US Army specialist position
- Marine Corps

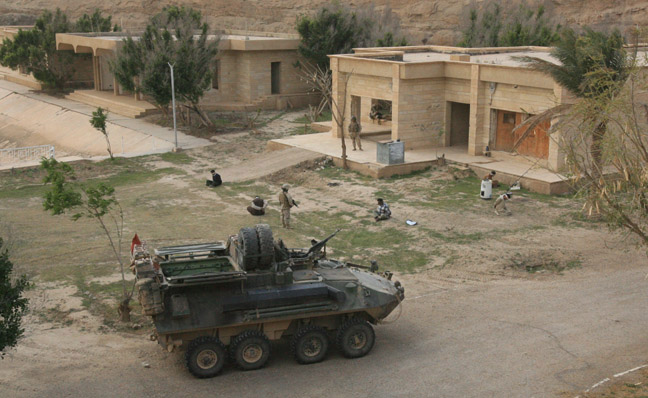
D Company, 3rd LAR Bn patrol north of Fallujah in April 2006

The United States Marine Corps light armored reconnaissance (LAR) battalions use the LAV-25, an 8×8 wheeled amphibious vehicle.

Regular

1. 1st Light Armored Reconnaissance Battalion – 1st Marine Division
2. 2nd Light Armored Reconnaissance Battalion – 2nd Marine Division
3. 3rd Light Armored Reconnaissance Battalion – 1st Marine Division

Reserve

1. 4th Light Armored Reconnaissance Battalion – 4th Marine Division (reservist)
