= 5th Battalion, 11th Marines =

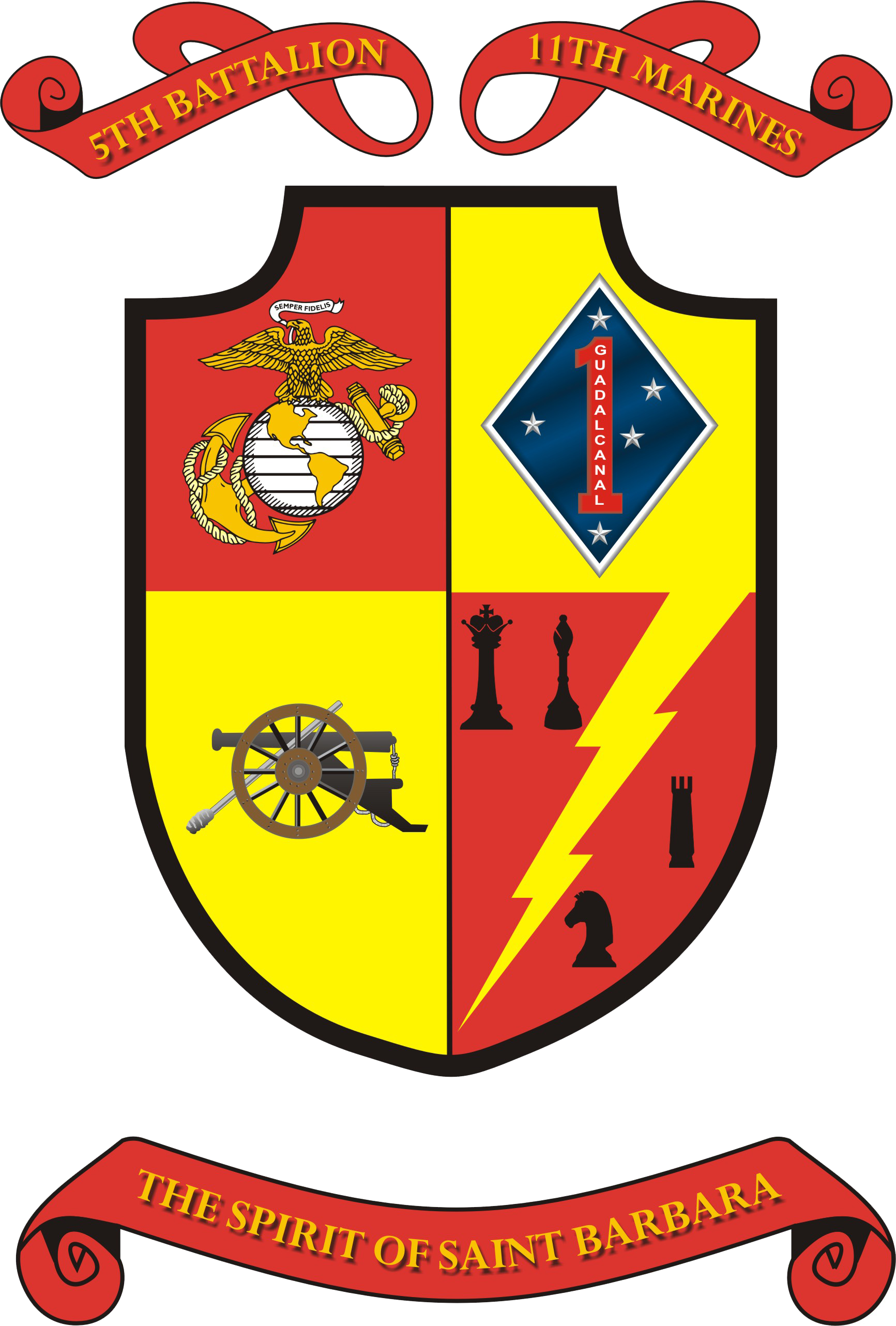
- 5/11 Insignia
- Active: 1 May 1942 – 17 February 1947; 16 July 1947 – 30 September 1947; 4 August 1950 – 29 March 2024
- Country: United States of America
- Branch: United States Marine Corps
- Type: Artillery
- Role: Provide fires in support of 1st Marine Division
- Size: 800
- Part of: 11th Marine Regiment; 1st Marine Division
- Garrison/HQ: Marine Corps Base Camp Pendleton
- Motto: "The Spirit of St. Barbara"
- Engagements: World War II: Battle of Guadalcanal; Battle of Cape Gloucester; Battle of Peleliu; Battle of Okinawa; Korean War: Battle of Inchon; Battle of Chosin Reservoir; Vietnam War; Operation Desert Storm; War on terror: Operation Iraqi Freedom; Operation Enduring Freedom

Commanders
- Current commander: LtCol Courtney J. Boston

5th Battalion, 11th Marines (5/11) was a High Mobility Artillery Rocket System (HIMARS) battalion consisting of four Firing Batteries and a Headquarters Battery. The battalion was stationed at Marine Corps Base Camp Pendleton, California. It was the first active duty HIMARS Unit in the Marine Corps. They fell under the command of the 11th Marine Regiment and the 1st Marine Division. It was the only battalion in the 11th Marine Regiment not using the M777A2 lightweight howitzer.

== Mission ==
Provide direct support of the 1st Marine Division and the Marine Expeditionary Units in time of conflict. That support may come in the traditional fashion of artillery support to maneuver forces, or by providing batteries to serve as provisional rifle companies. They also have the secondary mission of being the primary providers of civil-military operations (CMO). CMO is defined as the activities of the commander that establish, maintain, influence, or exploit relations between military organizations, Government and civilian organizations and the civilian populace.

== Current units ==
- Headquarters Battery – "HQ" Battery
- Battery Q – "Quebec" Battery
- Battery R – "Romeo" Battery
- Battery S – "Sierra" Battery
- Battery T – "Tango" Battery

== History ==
=== World War II ===
5th Battalion 11th Marines was activated on 1 May 1942 at New River, North Carolina. In June of that year they deployed to Wellington, New Zealand. They were re-designated on 1 January 1943 as the 4th Battalion, 11th Marines. During the war they participated in the following campaigns:

- Battle of Guadalcanal
- Eastern New Guinea
- New Britain
- Battle of Peleliu
- Battle of Okinawa

Following the surrender of Japan, the battalion was deployed to Tientsin, China as part of the occupation of northern China from October 1946 to January 1947. In January they returned to the United States to Marine Corps Base Camp Pendleton, California and were reassigned to the 3rd Marine Brigade. The battalion was deactivated on 17 February 1947. Later that year they were again activated on 16 July only to be deactivated again on 30 September.

=== Korean War ===
The battalion was reactivated on 4 August 1950 at MCB Camp Pendleton and were assigned to the 1st Marine Division. In August they deployed to Kobe, Japan and fought in the war until the Korean Armistice Agreement was signed on 27 July 1953. They participated in the following campaigns:

- Inchon/Seoul Campaign
- Battle of Chosin Reservoir
- East/Central Front
- Western Front

Following the war the battalion remained in Korea and participated in the occupation of the Korean Demilitarized Zone from August 1953 until March 1955 when they relocated to MCB Camp Pendleton

=== Vietnam War ===
The battalion was relocated to the Marine Corps Air Ground Combat Center Twentynine Palms, California. In February 1966 the battalion deployed to the Republic of Vietnam as part of the 1st Marine Division. They fought in Vietnam Until October 1970 operating from Chu Lai and Danang. They returned to the MCAGCC Twentynine Palms and were deactivated on 15 November 1974.

=== 1980s and 1990s ===
The 4th Battalion, 11th Marines was reactivated on 15 February 1979 at MCAGCC Twentynine Palms, California from units that had comprised the 1st Field Artillery Group. They were redesignated as 5th Battalion, 11th Marines on 1 October 1984.

The regiment participated in Operation Desert Storm from August 1990 until March 1991. During July and August 1994 the battalion helped fight major forest fires in the western United States.

=== Iraq ===
The battalion participated in the 2003 invasion of Iraq and has made subsequent deployments to Iraq as part of Operation Iraqi Freedom (OIF). During the 2003 invasion (OIF I), 5/11 participated on every major battle including the siege of Baghdad, Al Kut and Tikrit (Saddam Hussein's home town). The battalion fired more artillery rounds and drove further in less time than any artillery battalion in history during the invasion, and set the bar as the only artillery unit involved in Task Force Tripoli. In July 2006, Marines from Tango and Siera Batteries were deployed as part of the 15th MEU (Marine Expeditionary Unit, Special Operations Capable) to the Al Anbar province of Iraq. In August 2004, Marines from Romeo Battery participated in the Battle of Najaf.

=== Afghanistan ===
In 2010, Battery T, attached to 1st Marine Division's 1st MEF deployed to Camp Leatherneck, Helmand Province, Afghanistan. They returned in early August 2010. June 2011 – Feb 2012 romeo battery Helmand province. In 2012, Sierra Battery deployed to Now Zad. In July 2013, Quebec Battery deployed to Camp Leatherneck, Camp Bastion, and Fob Eredvi [Helmand Province] to relieve Sierra Battery. In 2014, Tango battery deployed to Camp Bastion, Helmand Province, Afghanistan. July 2014 to Nov 2014 Sierra Battery deployed with the mission to provide fire support and assist in the retrograde. Sierra Battery was never relieved and was the last firing battery in the Helmand Province.

Deactivation

The battalion was deactivated on 29 March 2024 in a ceremony aboard MCB Camp Pendleton as part of an effort to modernize the Marine Corps’ artillery.

== Unit awards ==
A unit citation or commendation is an award bestowed upon an organization for the action cited. Members of the unit who participated in said actions are allowed to wear on their uniforms the awarded unit citation. 5/11 has been presented with the following awards:

Ribbon	Unit Award
	Presidential Unit Citation with one Silver Star and three Bronze Stars
	Navy Unit Commendation with two Bronze Star
	Meritorious Unit Commendation
	Asiatic-Pacific Campaign Medal with one Silver Star
	World War II Victory Medal
	Navy Occupation Service Medal with Asia clasp
	China Service Medal
	National Defense Service Medal with two Bronze Stars
	Korean Service Medal with one Silver Star and two Bronze Stars
	Vietnam Service Medal with two Silver Stars and four Bronze Stars
	Southwest Asia Service Medal with two Bronze Stars
	Iraq Campaign Medal
	Global War on Terrorism Expeditionary Medal
	Global War on Terrorism Service Medal
	Korean Presidential unit Citation
	Vietnam Cross of Gallantry with Palm Streamer
	Vietnam Meritorious Unit Citation Civil Action Medal

== See also ==
- List of United States Marine Corps battalions
- Organization of the United States Marine Corps
