= 1st Light Armored Reconnaissance Battalion =

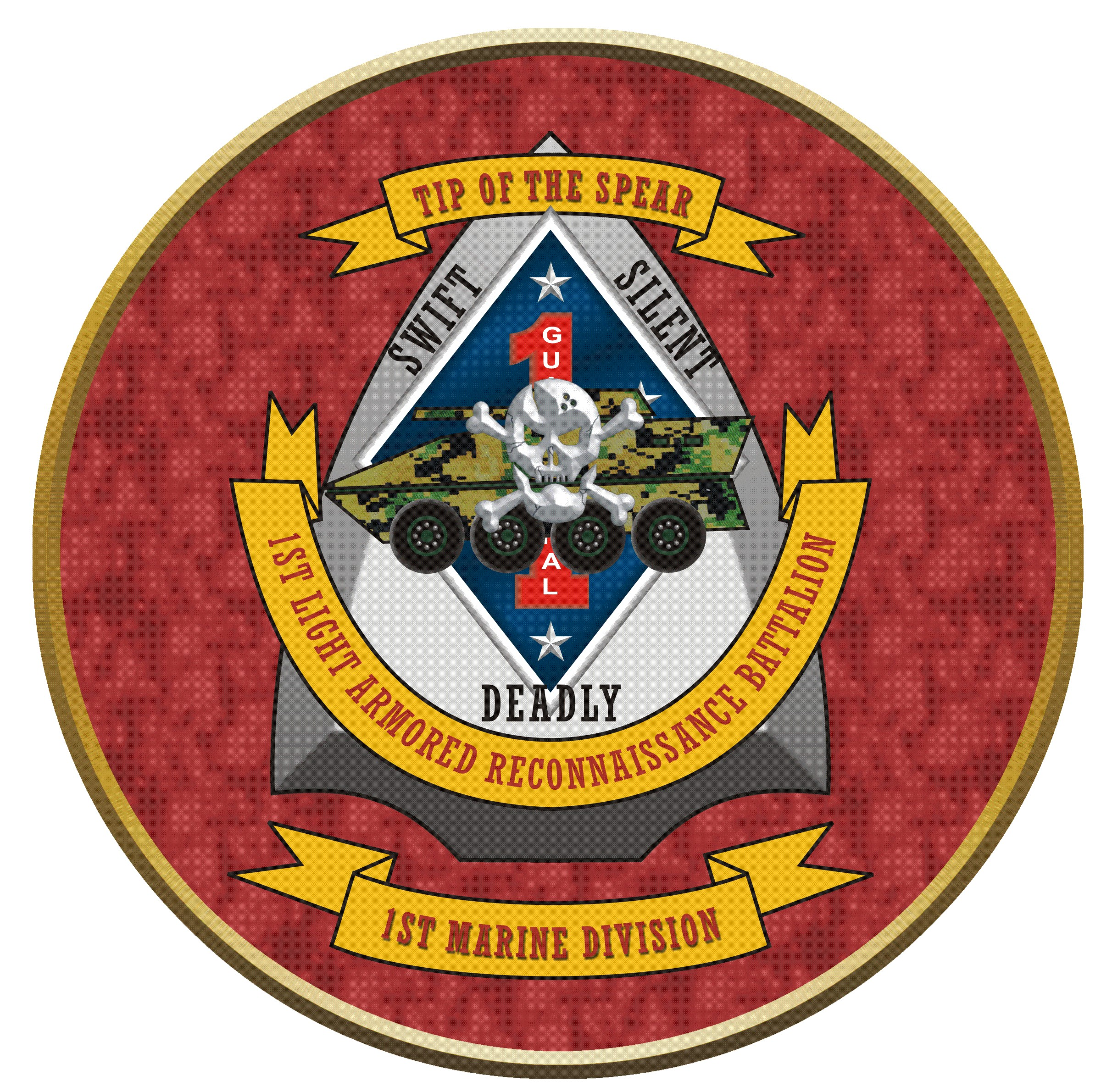
- 1st LAR Insignia
- Active: May 1985 – present
- Country: United States of America
- Branch: United States Marine Corps
- Type: Light armored reconnaissance battalion
- Role: Screen in advance of maneuver units
- Part of: 1st Marine Division; I Marine Expeditionary Force
- Garrison/HQ: Marine Corps Base Camp Pendleton
- Nickname: "Highlanders"
- Motto: "Tip of the Spear"
- Engagements: Operation Desert Storm; War on terror; Operation Iraqi Freedom; Operation Enduring Freedom

Commanders
- Current commander: LtCol. Adam S. Unkle

1st Light Armored Reconnaissance Battalion is a fast and mobilized armored terrestrial reconnaissance battalion of the United States Marine Corps. Nicknamed the "Highlanders," their primary weapon system is the LAV-25 Light Armored Vehicle armed with the M242 25mm Bushmaster chain gun. They fall under the command of the 1st Marine Division and the I Marine Expeditionary Force. The unit is based out of the Marine Corps Base Camp Pendleton, California.

== Organization ==
A LAV platoon consists of 4 vehicles usually divided into an Alpha section and a Bravo section. The platoon commander will control one section and also be the vehicle commander (VC) of one of the LAVs and the platoon sergeant will control the other section as well as be VC.

A crew consists of a driver, usually the most junior 0313 (the MOS designation for LAV Crewman), a VC, and the gunner. The gunner operates the main gun, the M242 Bushmaster chaingun. The VC makes target acquisition changes and helps the gunner make adjustments. The remaining crew consists of Scouts (0311). The LAV can hold as many as 6 scouts, but in most cases, there are only 3–4 in the back. There is also 1 corpsman per platoon, and 1 Light Armored Vehicle Mechanic (2147, the MOS designation for the LAV Mechanic).

== History ==
=== Early years ===
1st Light Armored Vehicle Battalion was activated in May 1985 and began receiving the first of its LAV-25 light armored vehicles in July 1985. On 9 October 1988, the battalion's name was changed to 1st Light Armored Infantry Battalion.

=== Persian Gulf War & the 1990s ===
In August 1990, First Light Armored Infantry Battalion deployed to Southwest Asia in response to Iraq's invasion of Kuwait. During Operation Desert Shield, 1st Light Armored Infantry Battalion was the forward unit of the 1st Marine Division, conducting screening and counter-reconnaissance operations along the Kuwaiti-Saudi Arabian border. During Operation Desert Storm, after breaching the Iraqi defensive positions, the 1st Light Armored Infantry Battalion attacked north to locate and destroy enemy forces. On the third day of the ground offensive, the 1st Light Armored Infantry Battalion was the first of the Allied Forces to enter Kuwait City, capturing Kuwait International Airport on 28 February 1991. The battalion redeployed to the United States in April 1991.

On May 1, 1992, the 1st Light Armored Infantry Battalion deployed to Los Angeles on a four-hour notice and assisted the Long Beach Police Department in quelling civil disturbances and looting. After a successful deployment as part of the Special Purpose Marine Air-Ground Task Force Los Angeles, the battalion returned once again to Camp Pendleton.

On June 12, 1992, the 1st Light Armored Infantry Battalion was redesignated as First Reconnaissance Battalion (Light Armored). Almost two years later, on March 1, 1994, the 1st Reconnaissance Battalion (Light Armored) underwent another name change and was redesignated First Light Armored Reconnaissance Battalion.

=== Global war on terror ===
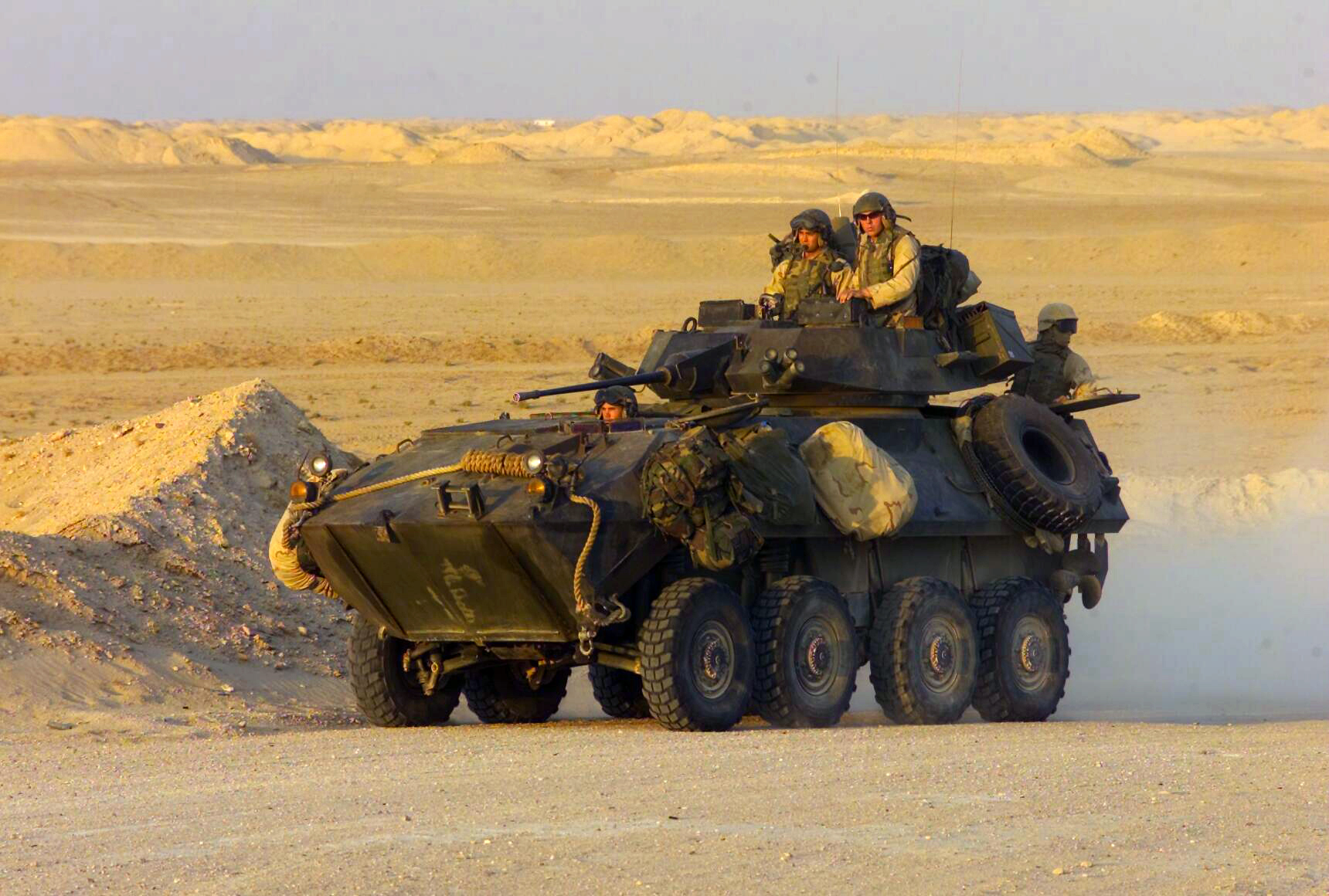
A 1st LAR LAV-25

In December 2001, Bravo Company, 1st Light Armored Reconnaissance Battalion deployed to Afghanistan as part of the 15th Marine Expeditionary Unit (Special Operations Capable) in support of Operation Enduring Freedom. It performed a variety of combat/reconnaissance missions in the rugged terrain of Afghanistan.

In January 2003, it was deployed to Southwest Asia in support of Operation Iraqi Freedom. The battalion, operating as part of Regimental Combat Team Five, was the first unit to cross the Iraqi-Kuwaiti Border on March 20, 2003. After attacking northward through Iraq, the 1st Light Armored Reconnaissance Battalion was instrumental in securing the capital of Baghdad. Due to its unique mobility and reconnaissance capabilities, the battalion left Regimental Combat Team Five and was assigned to Task Force Tripoli. As part of Task Force Tripoli, the battalion advanced further north, ultimately securing former Iraqi dictator Saddam Hussein's hometown of Tikrit. Following the cessation of major combat operations, First Light Armored Reconnaissance Battalion moved from the northern portion of Iraq to the country's extreme southern area along the Saudi-Arabian border to halt and deter illegal smuggling into Iraq. The First Light Armored Reconnaissance Battalion redeployed to the United States at the end of May 2003.

In February 2004 1st Light Armored Reconnaissance Battalion (-) again returned to Iraq. The battalion conducted security and stability operations in the Al Anbar province of western Iraq as part of Regimental Combat Team Seven. 1st LAR performed a wide range of critical missions, including key roles in regimental size operations, in order to capture or kill terrorist and insurgent forces. Additionally, the battalion was vital in patrolling the western borders of Iraq in order to prevent the infiltration of arms and insurgents from Ar Rutba in the south to Al Qaim further north. The battalion returned to the United States in October 2004.

In July 2004, Charlie Company deployed with the 31st MEU in support of Operation Phantom Fury, Fallujah, Iraq.

In March 2007, 1st LAR bn deployed to Rawah, Iraq to provide stability operations including anti-insurgent operations within a 200 mile radius.

In September 2008, 1st LAR deployed again to the Al Anbar Province in western Iraq and conducted a Relief In Place (RIP) with 2nd LAR of Camp Lejeune, North Carolina. 1st LAR conducted security and stabilization operations around Camp Korean Village and Ar Rutba before turning over the battlespace to 2nd Battalion, 25th Marines. 1st LAR then moved north to Sinjar Airfield, just west of Mosul, to conduct more security and stabilization operations. With them, they had elements of 1st Tanks, 2d tanks, A/1/2, 1st Reconnaissance Battalion, a Tow Missile Platoon and Army and Navy support personnel. In April 2009 1st LAR conducted a RIP with 3d LAR and redeployed to Camp Pendleton, CA. (Note, Fox Company, 4th LAR was attached to 1st LAR for the duration of this deployment)

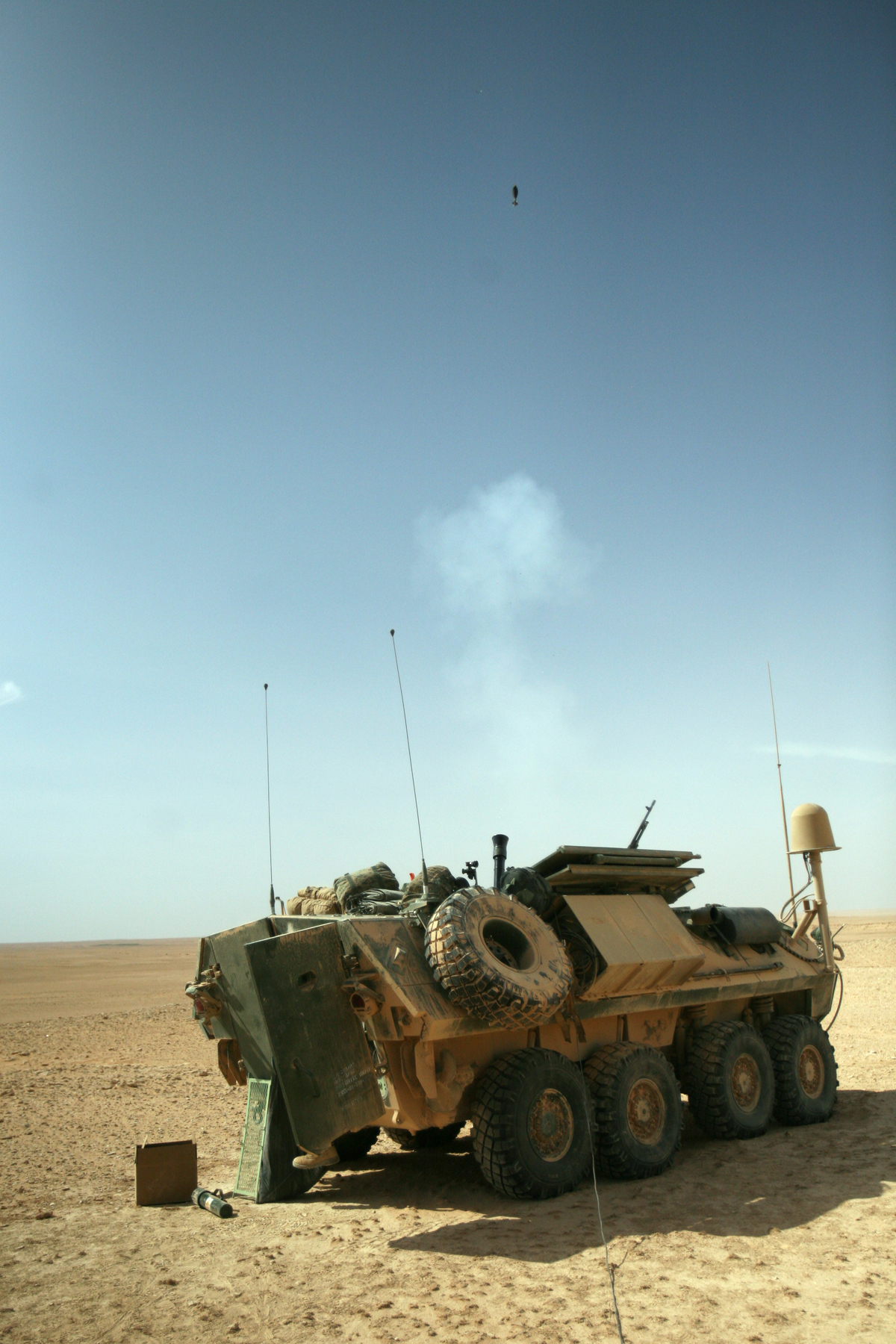
6 March 2009, A LAV-M with Fox Company, 1st Light Armored Reconnaissance, Regimental Combat Team 8, fires an 81mm high explosive mortar at a range here. This is the first time that mortarmen with Company F have been able to focus their primary skills due to their deployment mission of monitoring the Syrian border.

In May 2010, 1st LAR deployed to Reg-E-Khan Neshin district (Rig District) in southern Helmand Province, Afghanistan. While there, 1st LAR Bn remained the southernmost unit attached to the MEF. Operating out of Combat Out Post (COP) Payne as the Battalion CP, the unit controlled a swath of 750 square kilometers in southern Helmand Province. Operations out of COP Khan Neshin Castle, Patrol Base (PB) Shabu, and COP Taghaz were conducted by Alpha Company (Arthur Co). PB South Station controlled Sar Banadar and terrain south of the river along the fertile terrain and was occupied by Charlie Company (Celtic Co). The vastly unpopulated trafficking area to the south was controlled by Bravo Company (Beserker Co). Concurrently, Echo Company (Enormous Co), separated from the rest of the battalion, relying on British and Danish support, operated near Gereshk in central Helmand province and took part in hundreds of engagements and IED strikes in an attempt to control the only highway through Afghanistan at the time. Joint missions were conducted to close the gap between 3/1 and 1st LAR in October 2010. A substantial raid was conducted on Baghram Cha, a border town and chief logistical hub for Taliban activity in late October 2010, named Operation Steel Dawn. During the raid, 1st LAR, special operations forces, and Afghan forces neutralized Bahram Chah and destroyed the Bazaar and Taliban stronghold. 1st LAR conducted a RIP with 3rd LAR in November 2010.

1st LAR deployed again to Rig District in September 2011 and returned in May 2012.

== Equipment ==
The LAV-25 is an all-terrain, all-weather vehicle with night capabilities. It is air transportable via C-130, C-17 Globemaster, and C-5 Galaxy. When combat loaded there are 210 ready rounds and 420 stowed rounds of 25 mm ammunition as well as 400 ready rounds and 1200 stowed rounds of 7.62mm. There are 8 ready rounds and 8 stowed rounds of smoke grenades. A supplementary M240G 7.62mm machine gun can be pintle-mounted at the vehicle commander's station in the turret. The LAV-25 is fully amphibious with a maximum of 3 minutes of preparation.

== See also ==
- List of United States Marine Corps battalions
- Organization of the United States Marine Corps
