= Veterans for a Strong America =

Non-profit organisation in the USA

Veterans for a Strong America Action Group
- Founder: Joel Arends
- Tax ID no.: 36-4818487
- Legal status: Corporation (formerly 501(c)(4) Super PAC)
- Headquarters: Sioux Falls, South Dakota
- Chairman: Joel Arends
- Treasurer: Dan Backer
- Revenue: $24,760 (2015)
- Expenses: $22,253 (2015)
- Website: www.veteransforastrongamerica.org

Veterans for a Strong America (VSA) is a conservative political action committee that describes itself as a "non-partisan action organization dedicated to educating the public, members of Congress and the Executive Branch about a strong national defense, robust foreign policy and building a military that is second to none." The group was founded by Joel Arends of Sioux Falls, South Dakota, who is also the chairman and sole staffer of the group. Arends is an attorney and political consultant in Sioux Falls, where the organization is based. He previously worked as the South Dakota field director for the 2000 Bush-Cheney campaign and as a consultant to the Americans for Prosperity group, affiliated with the Koch brothers. VSA has been described as a dark money group.

== Background ==
Veterans for a Strong America is part of a "broader independent campaign by nonprofits linked to former Koch brothers operative Sean Noble," who runs the political consulting firm DC London. The group was formerly registered as a tax-exempt 501(c)(4) ("social welfare") non-profit organization, but the group's status was automatically revoked by the IRS in August 2015 because it failed to submit tax reporting documents (Form 990s) for three years in a row. The group is appealing the decision.

"Veterans for a Strong America has a history of bombastic advertisements linked to outlandish plans and fundraising appeals." In 2012, the group ran an advertisement, produced by DC London, which claimed that President Barack Obama had taken too much credit for the killing of Osama bin Laden. At the time, Arends "declared that the 'swift boating' of the president had begun." The effort was largely ineffective, and the group spent $750,000, a relatively small amount, on direct attack ads against Obama.

According to the group's latest filing with the Federal Election Commission as of mid-September 2015, the group has assets of US$30, and debts of US$318, owed to a consulting firm in Washington, D.C.

== Christine Jones attack ad ==
In May 2014, VSA released an attack advertisement against Arizona businesswoman Christine Jones, who was running against Arizona State Treasurer Doug Ducey in the Republican primary for Arizona gubernatorial election. The ad invoked the 2012 Benghazi attack and attacked Jones for "once writing kind words about former Secretary of State Hillary Clinton." Jones' campaign criticized the ad as the "act of a desperate, fledgling campaign and their dark money allies who feel the need to go to this absurd association." The ad was also produced by Nobel's DC London, which Arends called "a great partner to our organization."

== Trump campaign event ==
The group organized a campaign event for the Donald Trump presidential campaign of 2016 on the deck of the USS Iowa, News reports in September 2015 following the event publicized the fact that the group had lost its tax-exempt status.

The group's endorsement of Trump raised campaign finance questions as corporations are restricted to donating up to US$2,700 to a campaign; estimated event costs of US$11,000 paid by the VSA exceeded that amount, although there is no substantive evidence that "contribution limits or other campaign laws were broken." Other concerns raised include reports that the group does not appear to have any members or any relation with veterans.

According to CNN, the group "sounds like a charity" despite having its tax-exempt status revoked. The group claimed in a press release to have more than a half-million supporters, but a CNN investigative report "found scant evidence that Veterans for a Strong America has the supporters it says it does" and stated that "outside of Arends, CNN has found it difficult to find anyone with a direct link to the group." Nonprofit Quarterly referred to the group as a "fake vet nonprofit."

The VSA rose to notoriety in September 2015, after the Trump event. Attendees reportedly paid between $100 and $1,000 to attend the event. The group issued a statement denying that the group had violated election law by organizing the event. In an interview in September 2015, Arends said he was confident that the event was legal, while acknowledging that the group's tax-exempt nonprofit status had been revoked, but said that these problems predated his tenure with the group, as well as the current board of directors. Arends said that the group had disbanded in 2012 and was restarted by him in 2014. Arends said that the "liberal media" was out to get his group and that it was being attacked because they are endorsing Trump. KSFY-TV reported that "Arends says he works in tandem with six volunteer board members and that he has a database of more than 500,000 members who have contacted the organization."
