= 2nd Light Armored Reconnaissance Battalion =

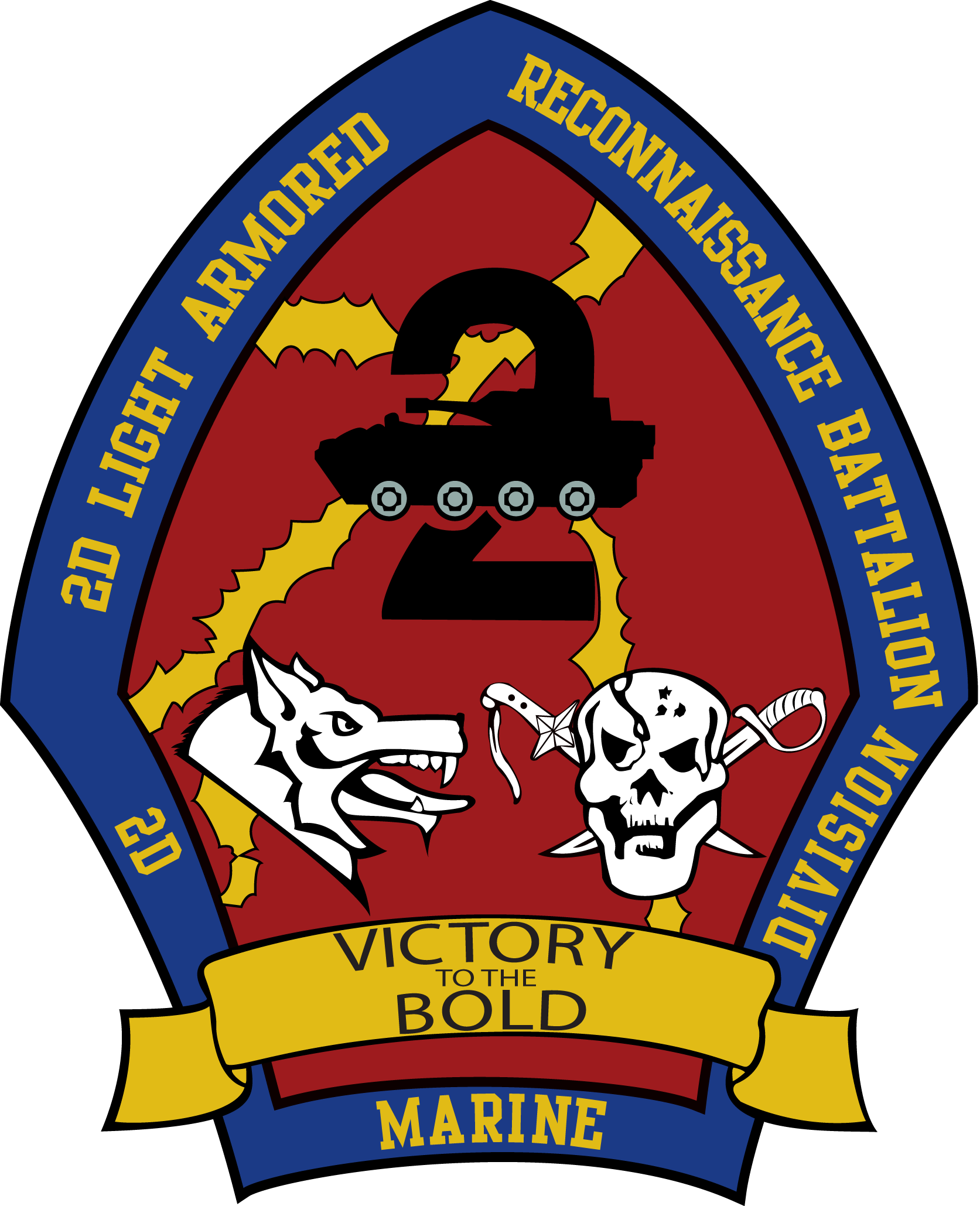
- 2nd LAR's emblem
- Founded: 1985
- Country: United States
- Branch: United States Marine Corps
- Type: Light armored reconnaissance battalion
- Part of: 2nd Marine Division; II Marine Expeditionary Force
- Garrison/HQ: Marine Corps Base Camp Lejeune
- Nickname: "Destroyers"
- Mascot: American Bulldog
- Engagements: Operation Just Cause; Operation Desert Storm; Operation Provide Comfort; Operation Restore Hope; Operation Uphold Democracy; Operation Joint Guardian: Zhegër incident; Operation Avid Response; Operation Unified Response; War on terror: Operation Enduring Freedom; Operation Iraqi Freedom

Commanders
- Current commander: LtCol Michael Kohler
- Command Sergeant Major: Sgt Maj David McFadden

2nd Light Armored Reconnaissance Battalion is a fast and mobilized armored terrestrial reconnaissance battalion of the United States Marine Corps. Their primary weapon system is the 8-wheeled LAV-25 and they fall under the command of the 2nd Marine Division and II Marine Expeditionary Force. The unit is based out of the Marine Corps Base Camp Lejeune, North Carolina. The current mission statement of the battalion is: To perform combined arms reconnaissance and security missions in support of the Ground Combat Element (GCE) of a Marine Air-Ground Task Force (MAGTF). Its mission is to conduct reconnaissance, security and economy of force operations, and, within its capabilities, limited offensive or defensive operations that exploit the unit's mobility and firepower.

The LAR battalion may function as an independent maneuver element or as an element of a larger unit such as a regimental combat team, or its subordinate companies may support other tactical units in the GCE.

== Subordinate units ==
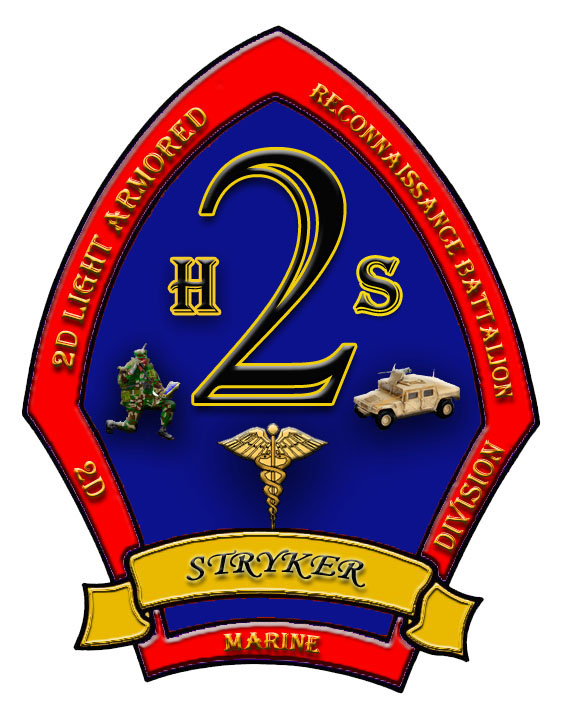
H&S Company (Stryker)

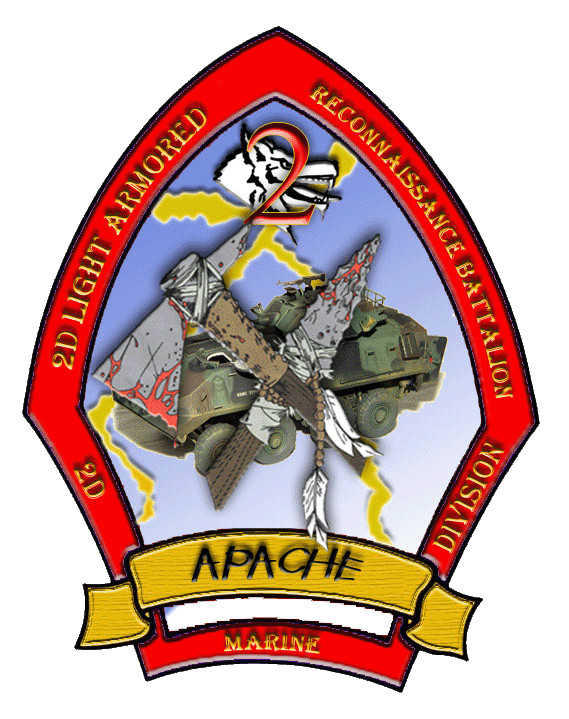
Alpha Company (Apache)

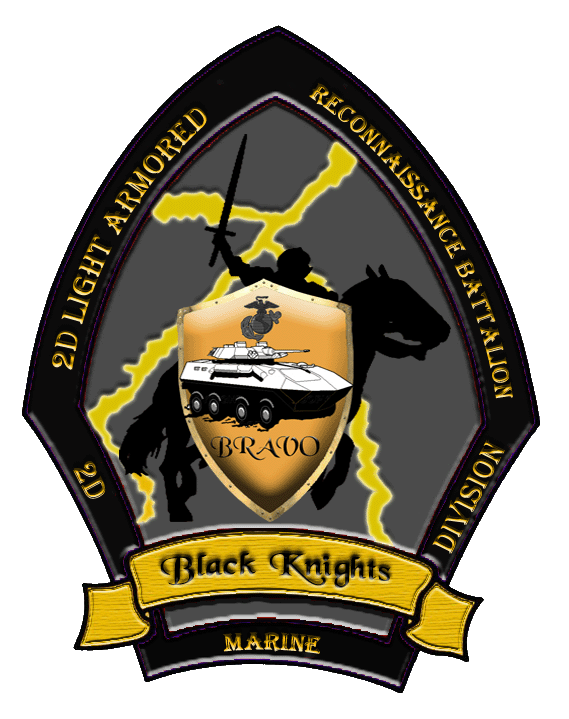
Bravo Company (Black Knights)

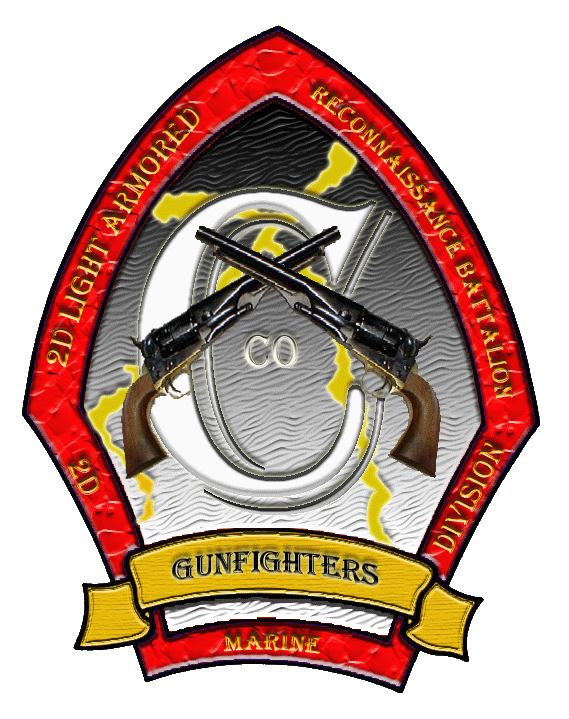
Charlie Company (Gunfighters)

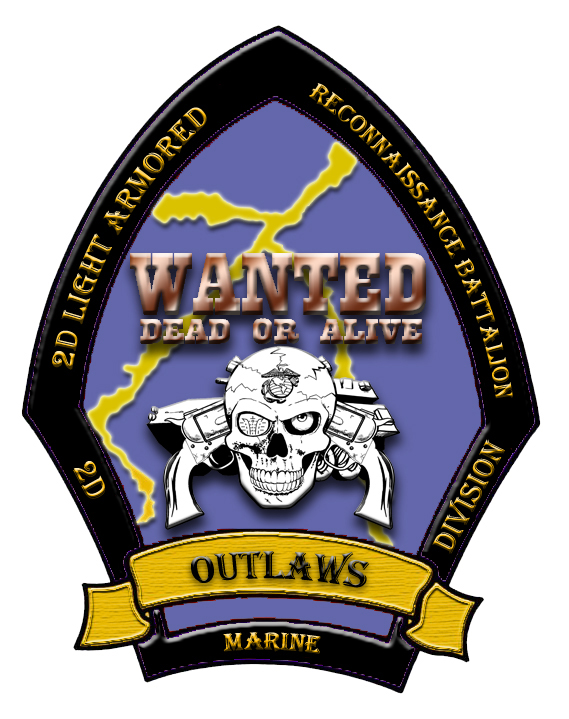
Delta Company (Outlaws) [DISBANDED]

== Organization ==
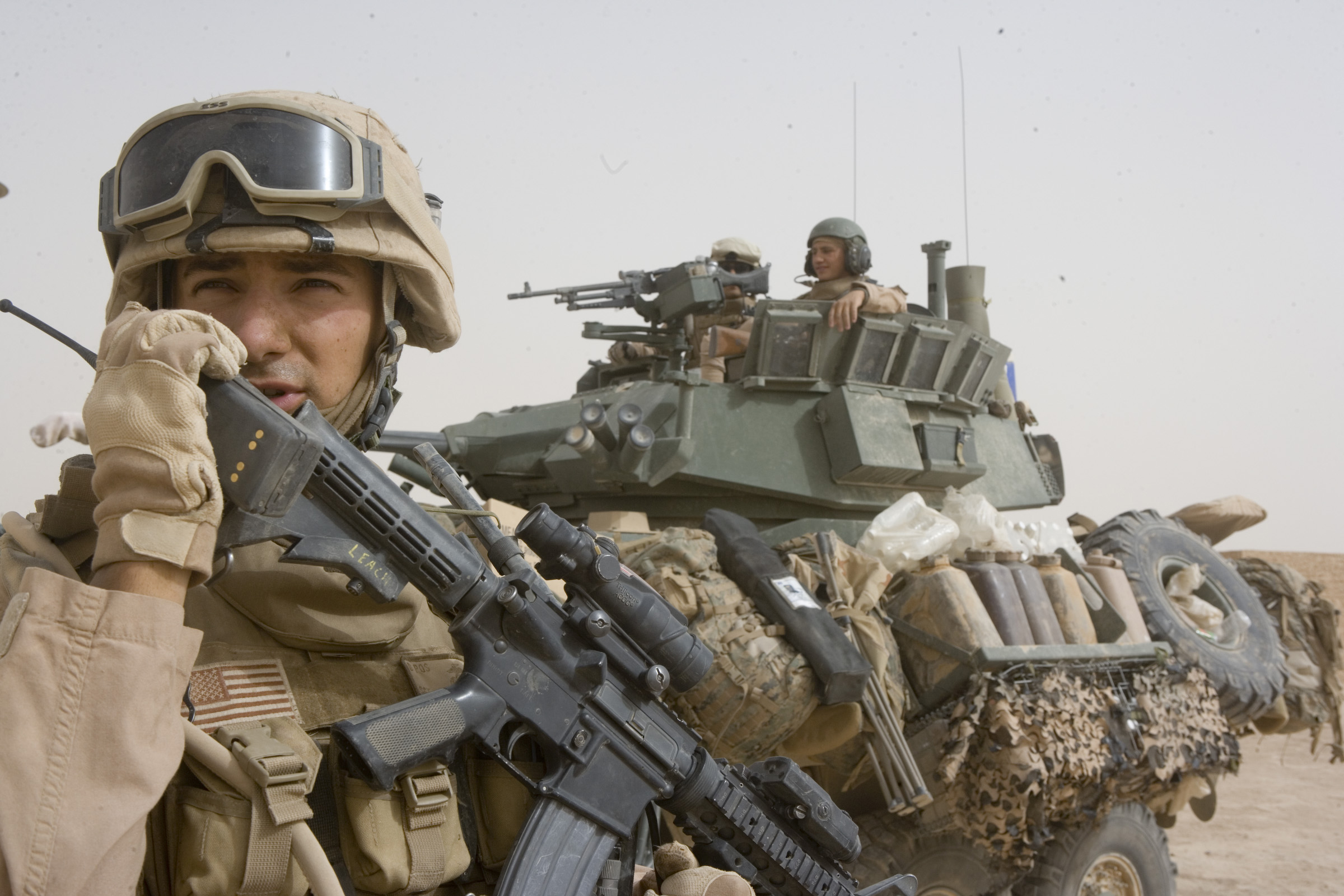
A 2nd Light Armored Reconnaissance Battalion Marine and LAV-25 in Iraq during June 2008

The United States Marine Corps Light Armored Reconnaissance Battalions, or LAR Battalions, are fast and mobilized armored terrestrial reconnaissance units that conduct reconnaissance-in-force (RIF) ahead of the battalion landing teams or division infantry forces. They mainly provide the Marine Air-Ground Task Force and the Marine Expeditionary Unit commanders vital intelligence of the enemy.

They perform their methods as special motorized, infantry-based reconnaissance units (or light cavalry) as they are equipped with LAV-25s to quickly penetrate enemy lines and locate and/or harass any enemy forces to determine their size, strengths, location, and any other pertinent information requested of the Marine commanders.

In counter-insurgency operations in the war on terror, LAR units provided long range patrolling capabilities, line of communication security, quick reaction force service, conducted and supported raids and cordon and searches, and supported infantry units in direct combat.

The 2nd LAR Battalion is assigned to the 2nd Marine Division and possess 3 line companies along with a headquarters and service company.

=== Light Armored Vehicle Mission Role Variants ===
The LAR battalion is equipped with six mission role variants (MRVs):

- LAV-25 (light armored vehicle-25 millimeter).
- LAV-AT (light armored vehicle-antitank).
- LAV-M (light armored vehicle-mortar).
- LAV-C2 (light armored vehicle-command and control).
- LAV-L (light armored vehicle-logistics).
- LAV-R (light armored vehicle-recovery).
- Light Armored Reconnaissance Scouts:

=== Light Armored Reconnaissance Scouts ===
Marines who have the military occupational specialty (MOS) 0311, rifleman are assigned to the LAR battalion as scouts. The scouts receive their scout training from the LAR battalion. The LAR scouts are not employed the same way as infantry or mechanized infantry. Each LAV-25 carries three scouts, who are trained and organized for employment in support of the LAV-25. The LAR scouts should be thought of as an integral part of the vehicle's employment capabilities. The vehicle/scout team is a complete system, with the vehicle and its scouts each dependent on the other for security, mobility, and firepower.

=== Troop density ===
The LAV-25 carries three LAV crewmen and four personnel (typically three scouts and either a corpsman, engineer, sniper, or mechanic) per vehicle. The LAR battalion table of organization (T/O)provides for 216 scouts. Operations requiring large numbers of infantry favor employing mechanized infantry units due to their higher troop density. This limitation can be offset by planning for reinforcements of LAR by helicopter borne or mechanized infantry units. The LAV should not be viewed as an infantry fighting vehicle or as an armored personnel carrier. This vehicle is an armored reconnaissance vehicle that lacks sufficient armor protection and troop density to perform missions normally assigned to a mechanized infantry unit.

== History ==
=== Activation ===
The first Light Armored Vehicle unit to be activated was Second LAV Battalion at Camp Lejeune, NC, during May 1985 and it began receiving its first LAVs in June 1985. The battalion underwent several name changes to include Light Armored Infantry in 1988 before settling in 1994 on Light Armored Reconnaissance (LAR) Battalion. This was done to better reflect the capabilities, mission, and purpose of the LAV equipped battalions.

=== Call signs ===
The battalion has been known by various call signs over the years. At inception, the battalion was known as "Wolfpack". In the late 1980s the call sign was briefly changed to "Dragoon" but was reverted to "Wolfpack" before deploying in support of Operation Desert Shield. When the battalion deployed in 2002, the call sign was changed to "Barbarians" because 3rd LAR BN was also known by the call sign "Wolfpack". During combat operations in March 2003, enemy transmissions were intercepted by Radio Battalion that referred to the unit as "the destroyers". RCT-1 re-designated the battalion as "Destroyer" and is still the current call sign of the battalion. When the battalion deployed in September 2006, again the call sign had to be changed due to a conflict in call signs. An army unit already in theater was using "Destroyer". For the duration of the deployment, the battalion was known as "Mountaineer". The name was chosen because the battalion commander at the time, LtCol Renforth, was a fan of the West Virginia Mountaineers.

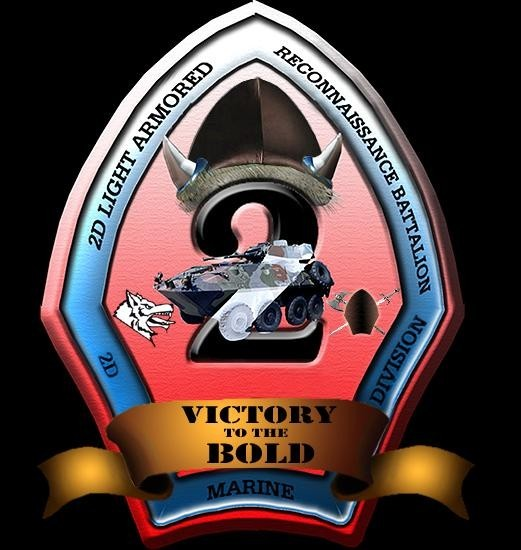
Barbarian Logo

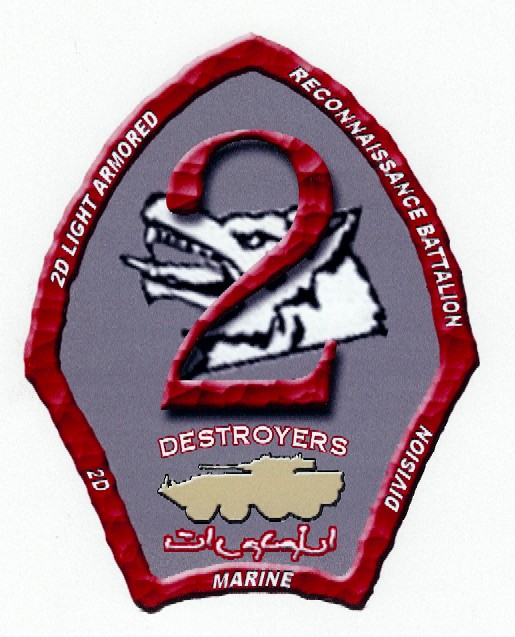
Destroyer Arabic Logo

=== Operation Just Cause ===
Operation Just Cause in Panama during 1989 was the first time LAVs were involved in combat operations. As US troops invaded the country to arrest the dictator President Manuel Noriega to justice for drug trafficking. LAV Companies from 2D LAV BN started deploying to Panama in 1988 and conducted freedom of movement exercises throughout the country and demonstrated their amphibious capability by swimming the Panama Canal. During Operation Just Cause LAVs demonstrated their versatility to supporting Special Operations Forces, blocking major highways, and securing important objectives. The first casualty for the battalion also occurred 20 December 1989 when Cpl Garreth Isaak was killed in action, by enemy gunfire. He was awarded the Silver Star (Posthumously).

=== Gulf War ===
The attack order assigned the 2d LAI Battalion to screen the division's front and flanks on the Kuwaiti side of the berm, starting on G minus 3, 21 February. The battalion was to "attempt to identify any gaps in the obstacle belt and locate an alternate breach site for Tiger Brigade in the Northwest." This last task was especially important should the division's main breach effort fail or be held up by the enemy. An alternate breach site would permit the Tiger Brigade to move its heavy armored power around the division's flank and help to pull the remainder of the division through. Although this was not needed in the end, it was an important contingency to anticipate.

The 2d LAR Battalion along with its supporting artillery unit the 1-3 field artillery from the US Army 1st Tiger Brigade sought contact and reported information on enemy troops, activities, and equipment. Operating almost continuously under antitank, rocket, and indirect fire, the battalion's companies engaged enemy troops, artillery, and tanks on at least 17 occasions, using organic antitank weapons, artillery fire from the 10th Marines, 1-3 field artillery and close air support. During these three days, the battalion accounted for numerous enemy KIA, the destruction of 12 enemy tanks, a further 35 tanks with air strikes, and the capture of 120 EPWs.

April 1991 through January 1992 the battalion provided detachments to the 24th and 26th MEU's in support of Operation "Provide Comfort" in Northern Iraq. On 15 May the 24th MEU Detachment swam the Tigris River.

=== Humanitarian missions ===
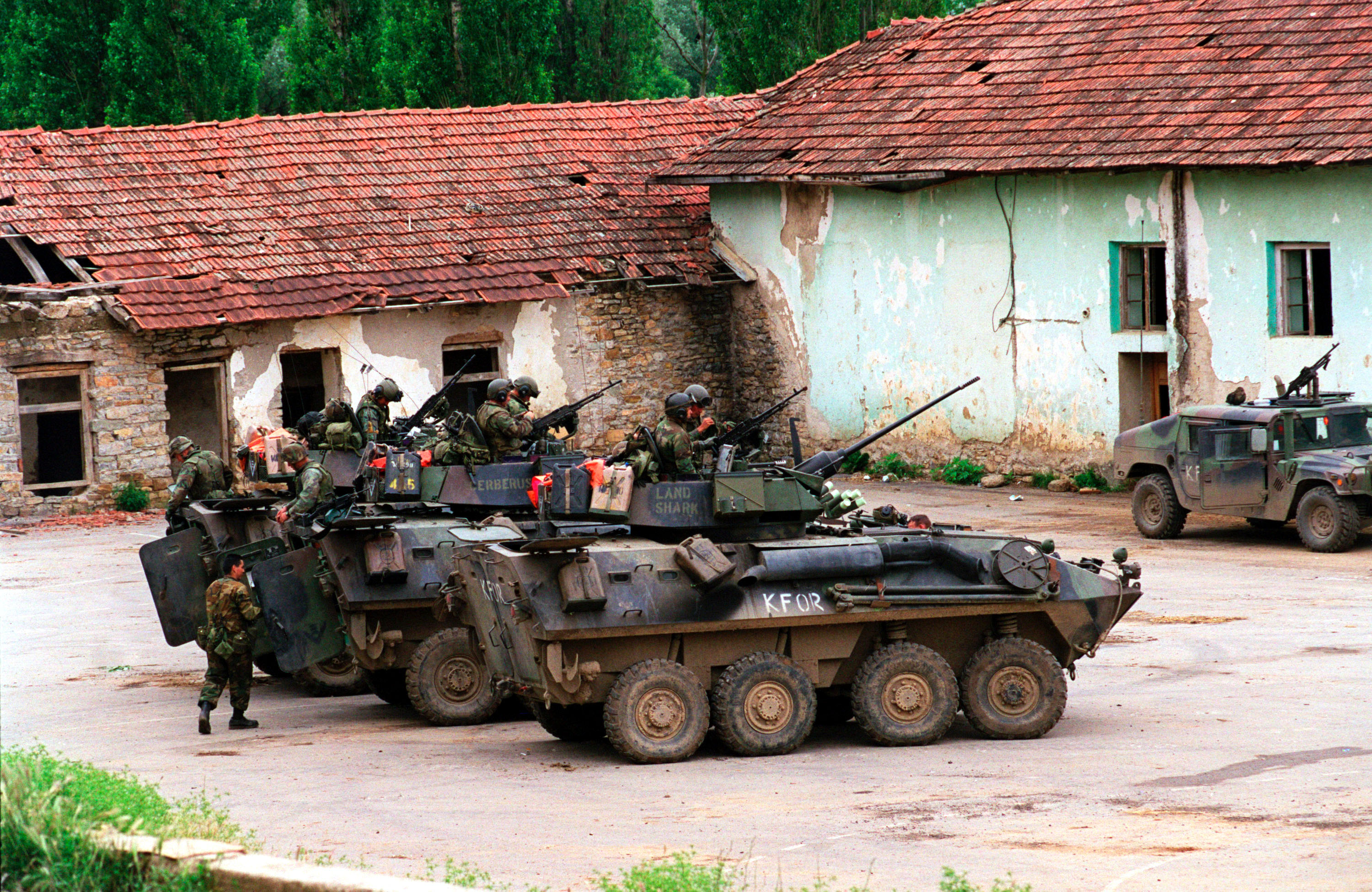
Members of the 2nd Light Armored Reconnaissance Battalion prepare to conduct a patrol in Kosovo during June 1999

Several detachments in support of MEU operations deploy to support operations in Kismayu and Mogadishu, Somalia from April 1992 through May 1994 during Operation "Restore Hope".

On 20 September 1994 BLT 2/2 landed in Haiti with a LAR platoon attachment during Operation "Restore Democracy". Landing on "Blue Beach" Camp Haitian, the Marines conducted convoy escorts, arms collection, disarmament of the Haitian Forces, and various Humanitarian Effort tasks.

From June to July 1999 an element of D Co deployed with the 26th MEU and participated in Operation "Joint Guardian". As the first U.S. peacekeepers in Kosovo, the Marines and sailors of the MEU provided stability to the embattled region.

During August 1999 elements of D Co deployed with the 26th MEU to support Operation "Avid Response". A Humanitarian mission following an earthquake in Turkey.

On 26 February 2003 the battalion received a Warning Order to prepare to deploy to Haiti in order to assist in stabilization operations. On 1 March 2003 the first elements of B Co arrived at Port-au-Prince, Haiti.

The company immediately began an aggressive patrol posture combating looters and gangs that controlled the area. They quickly seized control and maintained momentum throughout the deployment.

From 15 January to 8 March 2010, elements of Co B in support of 22 MEU, just returned from a 7-month deployment when they were recalled off of post deployment leave in order to re-deploy to provide humanitarian support to Haiti following the 7.0 magnitude earthquake that struck just west of Port-au-Prince on 12 January 2010. The MEU conducted the re-call and was embarked for departure in less than 56 hours from receiving the order to redeploy for Operation "Unified Response".

=== Global war on terror ===
During late 2001 2d LAR landed at Camp Rhino in Afghanistan which was already held by the 15th MEU to begin the assault on Kandahar. A combined unit formed by 2d and 3d LAR and the 15th and 26th MEU assaulted and took Kandahar international airport in December 2001. Further operations would be held from that location up to February 2002 to include the most notable Operation Anaconda. In February 2002 that base was handed over to 101st Airborne units.

==== Operation Iraqi Freedom ====
During early 2003 all three active-duty LAR battalions and the one reserve battalion were mobilized and deployed to Kuwait for Operation Iraqi Freedom. The LAR battalions accompanied all the regimental combat teams into action, and elements of 1st LAR attached to RCT-5 were among the first ground combat units into Iraq. Lieutenant General Conway, the MEF commander, opted to orchestrate the war forward using a pair of LAV-C2s for command and control. LAVs from 2nd LAR, attached to RCT-1, broke through the city of Al Nasiriyah after stiff Fedayeen resistance was encountered. Once in Baghdad, 1st, 2nd, and 3rd LAR Battalions were reorganized into Task Force Tripoli to continue the attack north and capture Saddam Hussein's hometown of Tikrit. Along the way elements of 3d LAR Battalion rescued the American prisoners of war from the Iraqis. Operation Iraqi Freedom marked the longest inland penetration by US Marine Forces ever, and no units went further and faster than the LAR battalions, again proving their incredible versatility and capability.

Since Operation Iraqi Freedom began, 2nd LAR Battalion has completed and supported multiple Iraq deployments. From January to June 2003, the full battalion deployed and fought in the 2003 invasion of Iraq. From February to September 2004, Delta Co. deployed to Fallujah, Iraq in support of RCT-1. From September 2004 to March 2005, Alpha Co. deployed to Fallujah, Iraq and relieved D. Company. From February to September 2005, 2nd LAR Battalion(-) deployed to Ar Rutbah, Iraq with H&S Co., Bravo Co., and Charlie Co.. Primarily based out of FOB Korean Village, the 2nd LAR Battalion conducted aggressive patrolling and MSR security throughout western Al Anbar Province and in and around the cities of Ar Rutbah, Akashat, Al Qaim, Haditha, Hit, and Al Asad. During this time period, the temporary formation of Echo Company (call-sign "Lighthorse") was accomplished by splitting Charlie Co. in half and reinforcing it with men and vehicles from H&S Company. The two company(-) rotated back and forth between Combat Outpost Rawah and Korean Village while Bravo Co. conducted combat operations along the river cities. From September 2006 to April 2007 elements of 2nd LAR Battalion deployed back to Korean Village. Stationed at Camp Korean Village was Charlie Co. along with half of H&S Co. while Combat Outpost Rawah had Alpha Co., Delta Co. and the other half of H&S Co. stationed there. During the last deployment the battalion had four marines killed in action. The unit is currently stationed in theater in support of Operation Iraqi Freedom.

== Significant events ==
4-8 February 2003, 2d LAR Battalion deployed to Kuwait with Companies A, B, and H&S Company; Weapons Company was disbanded on 17 January and integrated into A and B Companies, C Co was attached to the MEF Headquarters.

On 17 March 2003 at 2345Z the order to move to the dispersal area was received. At 0600Z the battalion began the road march in its standard order; Alpha, Tactical COC, Bravo, Main COC, Combat Train, and the Field Train.

On 19 March 2003 at 0300Z the battalion was ordered to assume MOPP Level 1 due to heightening tensions in the area.

20 March 2003 Saddam Hussein launched his own assault, with a truck bomb exploding at Camp Commando, and missiles fired at Camps Commando, Virginia, New York, and in the vicinity of Highway 80.

At 0300Z on the 21st, Alpha Company led the battalion through the breach; the battalion conducted a "Zone Reconnaissance" along Route Tampa and conducted link ups with the Army's TF 3-69 and TF Tarawa and the assault on An Nasiriyah.

After traveling north all day, and battling numerous small enemy detachments the battalion established a defensive position straddling Highway 7 well north of An Nasiriyah. Almost immediately the battalion was attacked with both direct and indirect fire weapons systems in a battle that would later be called "The Battle of the Coil".

This battle and the subsequent "Running Gun-fights" through numerous towns would result in the Battalion's renaming as "Destroyers".

On 1 April, reports surfaced that a large number of enemy vehicles, including armor moved into Al Hayy airfield; B Co led the RCT's assault on the airfield. Supported with Cobra's the Regiment attached through Al Hayy which resulted in the destruction of large numbers of enemy vehicles, bunkers, and weapons caches.

After the battalion fixed the enemy in the vicinity of Al Kut, the battalion conducted a 250 kilometer road march, bypassing Al Kut. The battalion repositioned itself in the vicinity of An Nu’meniyah.

Following the road march, the battalion re-designated under TF Tripoli; which consisted of 3 LAR Bns, 5th Bn 11th MarReg, Company G/2/23, and an Engineer Company.

The Destroyer's conducted operations IVO Tikrit until 20 April, following Easter TF Tripoli conducted relief in place with 4th Infantry Div. and the battalion was ordered to displace back to Tactical Assembly Area (TAA) Paige.

9 through 13 May the battalion moved back to Camp Matilda, Kuwait and began preparing to return home, with the last Marines arriving on 28 June.

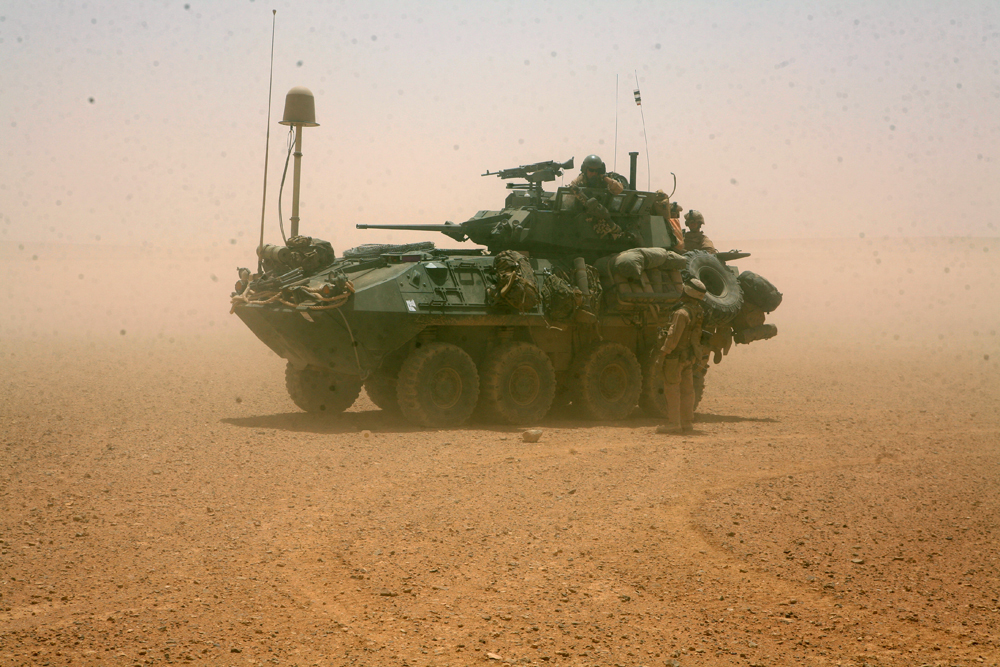
A 2nd Light Armored Reconnaissance Battalion LAV-25 in Iraq during 2008

D Company Deployed in support of I MEF on 28 February through September 2004. D Company was assigned directly to RCT-1 and operated out of Camp Baharia, Iraq. During its 8-month deployment D Company conducted combat operations around Fallujah, Zaidon, Al-Karmah, Abu Ghraib, and Al Iskandariyah. D Company was constantly in the field and was often engaged directly during this time period as it pursued an aggressive patrolling and reconnaissance mission in support of RCT-1. This included but was not limited to performing HVT raids, QRF missions, anti-rocket and mortar patrols, cordon and sweep operations, and counter IED/ambush patrols on MSR Michigan and MSR Mobile. Additionally, Outlaw 2 (2nd platoon) provided personal security to the 1st Marine Division commander, Major General Jim Mattis, during two meetings with insurgent leaders in the middle of downtown Fallujah between the battles of Fallujah I and Fallujah II. As a result of its constant presence in the field, D Company experienced high casualties. The company suffered 8 KIA, 20 WIA, and lost three LAV-25s to enemy contact.

A Company conducted a relief in place with D Company, 17 September 2004. The company conducted combat operations in and around Fallujah from September 2004 to March 2005. During the company's 7-month deployment they conducted several blocking positions, reinforced VCPs, and conducted an aggressive patrolling effort and reconnaissance mission in and around Fallujah and participated in several operations in support of RCT-1.

From March through October 2005 the battalion conducted combat operations in the vicinity of Al Asad, Camp Korean Village, and Al Qaim in support of RCT-5.

From 10 September 2006 through April 2007, the battalion deployed to western Al Anbar Province, Iraq. This time to Camp Korean Village and AO Rawah. The battalion deployed B Company, C Company, and its HQ Company on this deployment. Due to the large number of veterans that had completed several previous deployments to Iraq the terrain was familiar and the battalion was able to rapidly affect changes to the tactical layout of the AO.

The battalion conducted operations in AO Rawah, Camp Korean Village, Rutbah, Al Qa'im, and Akashat as an independent battalion. The battalion conducted extended desert operations utilizing rapid ground refueling, supported by CH53E USMC helicopters. Throughout the deployment, the battalion supported interdiction operations along the Syrian Border in support of Operation Deny Al-Qaeda North (DAN), a MEF level operation.

=== Operation Enduring Freedom ===
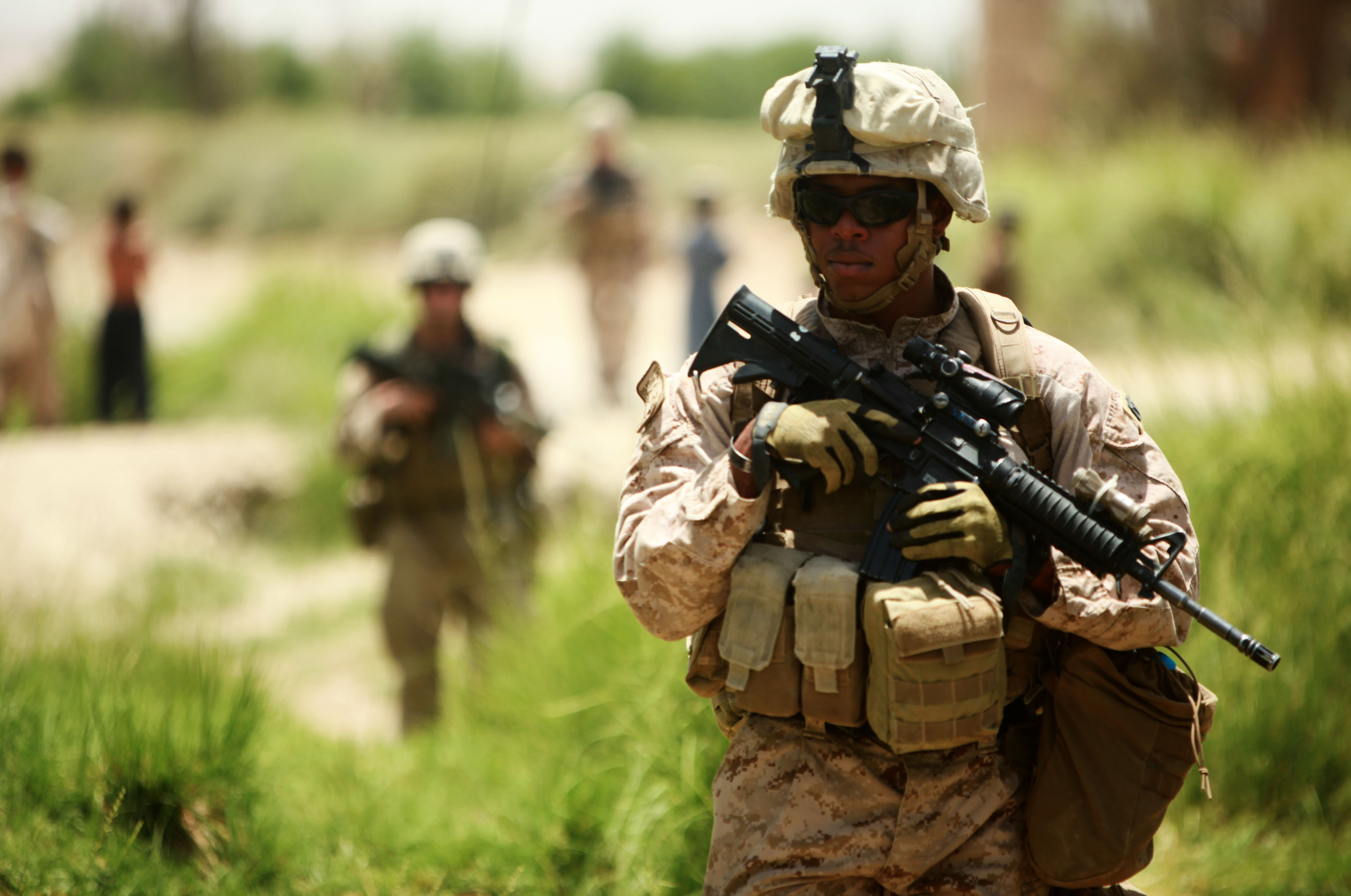
Members of Delta Company, 2nd Light Armored Reconnaissance Battalion patrolling in Afghanistan during June 2011

January through April 2002, Co A deploys a platoon in support of BLT 3/6, 26 MEU; They operated in vicinity of Kandahar. During their deployment the detachment conducted VCPs, ECPs, and an aggressive patrolling effort and reconnaissance missions.

March through October 2008, Co B provided a platoon in support of 1/6, 24 MEU. The BLT operated in the southern Helmand Province. At that time they were the southernmost coalition force. They established an aggressive patrolling effort and conducted several reconnaissance missions.

May through November 2009, the battalion conducted operations in the vicinity of Southern Helmand Province. They seized Khan Neshin Castle and established (2) COPS and several Afghan Border Patrol and Afghanistan National Police Stations. The battalion deployed as part of the 2nd Marine Expeditionary Brigade. They were part of the 17,000 troop increase announced by President Obama in mid-February.

Company A deployed in support of 4th LAR from December 2009 through June 2010; conducting operations in the Marjah area.

On 2 July 2009, 2nd LAR, as the southern push of Operation Khanjar, entered Khan Neshin village with the village elders' permission.

May through November 2011, the battalion deployed again to the vicinity of Southern Helmand Province with headquarters elements operating out of FOB Payne with numerous COPS and patrol bases spread throughout the area.

== Awards ==
The battalion has been awarded the following battle streamers:

Ribbon	Unit Award
	Presidential Unit Citation
	Navy Unit Commendation
	Meritorious Unit Commendation
	National Defense Service Medal
	Southwest Asia Service Medal
	Afghanistan Campaign Medal
	Iraq Campaign Medal
	Global War on Terrorism Expeditionary Medal
	Global War on Terrorism Service Medal
	Inherent Resolve Campaign Medal

== See also ==
- List of United States Marine Corps battalions
- Organization of the United States Marine Corps
