= United States Army Quartermaster Corps =

U.S. Army branch charged with general supply and subsistence

Quartermaster Corps
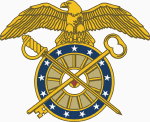
- Quartermaster Corps branch insignia
- Active: June 16, 1775–March 16, 1802; March 28, 1812–present
- Country: United States
- Branch: United States Army
- Role: Quartermaster
- Size: Corps
- Headquarters: Fort Lee
- Motto: Supporting Victory
- Color: Buff
- March: Quartermaster March
- Anniversaries: June 16 (Organization Day)
- Wars: Revolutionary War; War of 1812; Mexican War; Civil War; Indian Wars; War with Spain; China Relief Expedition; Philippine Insurrection; Mexican Expedition; World War I; World War II; Korean War; Vietnam; Southwest Asia; Kosovo; War on terrorism; 2026 Iran War
- Website: quartermaster.army.mil

Commanders
- Quartermaster General: Col. Kevin W. Agness

Insignia
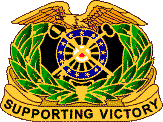
- Quartermaster Corps regimental insignia
- Abbreviation: QM

The Quartermaster Corps (QM), formerly known as the Quartermaster Department, is the sustainment branch of the United States Army. As such, it acts as quartermaster to the army.

The Quartermaster School (QMS) is a subordinate command of the Combined Arms Support Command. The QMS trains soldiers, civilians, and members of other services and nations in quartermaster skills and functions. In addition to training, the QMS has command of the 23rd Quartermaster Brigade and serves as a proponent on all quartermaster matters. The QMS is located at Fort Lee, Virginia.

== Mission ==
The mission of the corps is to support the development, production, acquisition, and sustainment of general supply, Mortuary Affairs, subsistence, petroleum and water, and material and distribution management during peace and war to provide combat power to the U.S. Army. The officer in charge of the branch for doctrine, training, and professional development purposes is the Quartermaster General. The current Quartermaster General is Colonel Kevin W. Agness.

The function of the Quartermaster Corps is to provide the following support to the Army:

- general supply (except for ammunition and medical supplies)
- Mortuary Affairs (formerly graves registration)
- subsistence (food service)
- petroleum and water
- field services
  - aerial delivery (parachute packing, air item maintenance, heavy and light equipment parachute drop, rigging and sling loading)
  - shower, laundry, fabric/light textile repair
- material and distribution management

== History ==
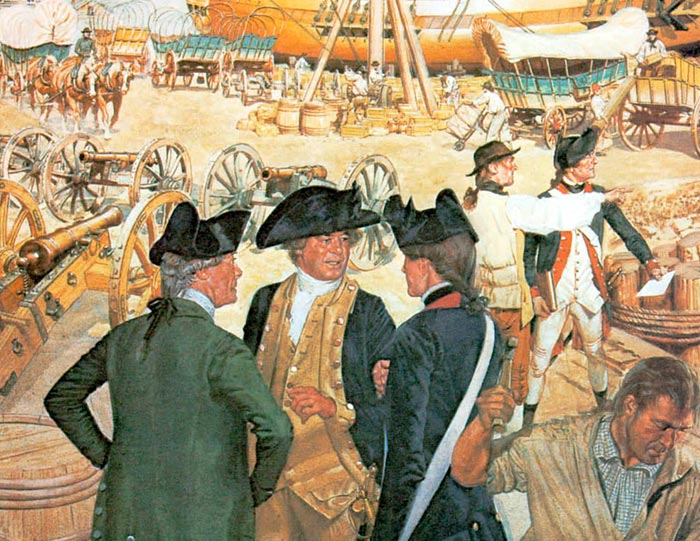
Assistant Quartermaster General John Parke gives instructions to a captain of artillery whose company has just arrived from Boston. New London, 1776.

The Quartermaster Corps is the U.S. Army's oldest logistics branch, established 16 June 1775. On that date, the Second Continental Congress passed a resolution providing for "one Quartermaster General of the grand army and a deputy, under him, for the separate army".

In 1802 under President Thomas Jefferson the size of the US Army was reduced with the Quartermaster Department being disbanded. In its place the nation was divided into three departments, each with its own agent and subordinates who were responsible for quartermaster functions within each Department The Quartermaster Corps was re-established in 1812.

From 1775 to 1912, this organization was known as the Quartermaster Department. In 1912, Congress consolidated the former Subsistence, Pay, and Quartermaster Departments to create the Quartermaster Corps. Quartermaster units and soldiers have served in every U.S. military operation from the Revolutionary War to the Iraq War (first U.S. phase, 2003-2011) and the War in Afghanistan (2001-2021).

In 1962 the responsibility for military heraldry was transferred from the Quartermaster Corps to the United States Army Adjutant General's Corps.

The 14th Quartermaster Detachment, a U.S. Army Reserve unit from Greensburg, Pennsylvania, suffered the greatest number of casualties of any allied unit in the Gulf War from a Scud missile attack on 25 February 1991.

=== Former functions ===
Former functions and missions of the Quartermaster Corps were:

- military transportation (given to the newly established Army Transport Service during the American Civil War and to the Transportation Corps in 1942)
- military construction (given to the Corps of Engineers in the early 1940s)
- U.S. Army Remount Service horses/war dogs (military dog training given to Corps of Military Police in 1951)

=== Notable casualties ===
- Eric G. Gibson, T/5 Company Cook attached to the 30th Infantry Regiment in WWII. Led a squad to attack enemy positions, destroyed four enemy positions, and secured the left flank of his company. Posthumously awarded the Medal of Honor
- Maj. Steve V. Long, a Quartermaster Officer who was serving as Secretary of the General Staff Office of the Commanding General U.S. Total Army Personnel Command, was one of the casualties of the September 11 attacks when American Airlines Flight 77 struck the Pentagon.
- Several members of the 507th Maintenance Company were captured or killed in an ambush on 23 March 2003 during the Iraq War:
  - Sergeant Donald Walters, killed in action – Silver Star recipient
  - Specialist Edgar Hernandez, captured
  - Specialist Shoshana Johnson, captured
  - Private First Class Howard Johnson II, killed in action
  - Private First Class Jessica Lynch, captured
  - Private First Class Lori Piestewa, killed in action
  - Private Brandon Sloan, killed in action
  - Private Ruben Estrella-Soto, Jr, killed in action

== Structure ==
The officer in charge of Quartermaster doctrine, training, and professional development purposes is the Quartermaster Commandant who commands the United States Army Quartermaster Center and School, located at Fort Gregg-Adams, Virginia, near Petersburg. This school provides enlisted advanced individual training (AIT) and leader training for Quartermaster officers, warrant officers and non-commissioned officers..

The current Quartermaster Commandant is Colonel Kevin W. Agness.

For a list of US Army Quartermasters General, see Quartermaster General (United States).

Quartermaster detachments, companies and battalions are normally assigned to corps or higher level commands. Divisions and smaller units have multifunctional support battalions which combine functional areas from the Army Transportation Corps, Army Quartermaster Corps, Army Ordnance Corps, and the Army Medical Service Corps.

Quartermaster organizations include field service, general supply, petroleum supply and petroleum pipeline, aerial delivery (rigger), water, and mortuary affairs units. Most are company level except petroleum and water, which has battalion and group level units. There is one Bulk petroleum Company on Active Duty.

- 59th Quartermaster Company
- 103rd Quartermaster Company
- 126th Quartermaster Company
- 132nd Quartermaster Company
- 133rd Quartermaster Company
- 148th Quartermaster Company
- Headquarters and Headquarters Company, 165th Quartermaster Group
- 165th Quartermaster Group
- 226th Quartermaster Company
- Headquarters and Headquarters Company, 240th Quartermaster Battalion
- 295th Quartermaster Company
- 311th Quartermaster Company
- 356th Quartermaster Company
- Headquarters and Headquarters Company, 383rd Quartermaster Battalion
- 464th Quartermaster Company
- 473rd Quartermaster Company
- 488th Quartermaster Company
- 490th Quartermaster Company
- 549th Quartermaster Company
- 574th Quartermaster Company
- 581st Quartermaster Company
- 590th Quartermaster Company
- 610th Quartermaster Company
- 623rd Quartermaster Company
- 673rd Quartermaster Company
- 725th Quartermaster Company
- 877th Quartermaster Company
- 887th Quartermaster Company
- 960th Quartermaster Company
- Headquarters and Headquarters Detachment 61st Quartermaster Battalion
- Headquarters and Headquarters Detachment 154th Quartermaster Battalion
- Headquarters and Headquarters Detachment, 247th Quartermaster Battalion
- Headquarters and Headquarters Detachment, 319th Quartermaster Battalion
- Headquarters and Headquarters Detachment, 418th Quartermaster Battalion
- Headquarters and Headquarters Detachment, 423rd Quartermaster Battalion
- 640th Quartermaster Detachment
- 690th Quartermaster Detachment
- 801st Quartermaster Detachment

Army Reserve and National Guard Quartermaster units included the:

- 201st Quartermaster Battalion, Georgia Army National Guard

== Military Occupational Specialities ==
The nine Quartermaster Enlisted Military Occupational Specialties (MOSs) are:

- 92A – Automated Logistical Specialist
- 92F – Petroleum Supply Specialist
- 92G – Culinary Specialist
- 92L – Petroleum Laboratory Specialist
- 92M – Mortuary Affairs Specialist
- 92R – Parachute Rigger
- 92S – Shower/Laundry and Clothing Repair Specialist
- 92W – Water Treatment Specialist
- 92Y – Unit Supply Specialist

The five Quartermaster Warrant Officer Military Occupational Specialties (MOSs) are:

- 920A – Property Accounting Technician
- 920B – Supply Systems Technician
- 921A – Airdrop Systems Technician
- 922A – Food Service Technician
- 923A – Petroleum Systems Technician

The three Quartermaster Officer Areas of Concentration (AOCs) have been merged into 92A as Additional Skill Identifiers (ASIs)

- 92A – Quartermaster, General
- R9 – Aerial Delivery and Materiel (formerly 92D)
- R8 – Petroleum and Water (formerly 92F)

== Quartermaster Creed ==
Quartermaster Creed

I am Quartermaster. My story is enfolded in the history of this nation. Sustainer of Armies...

My forges burned at Valley Forge. Down frozen, rutted roads my oxen hauled the meager foods a bankrupt Congress sent me... Scant rations for the cold and starving troops, gunpowder, salt, and lead.

In 1812 we sailed to war in ships my boatwrights built. I fought beside you in the deserts of our great Southwest. My pack mules perished seeking water holes, and I went on with camels. I gave flags to serve. The medals and crest you wear are my design.

Since 1862, I have sought our fallen brothers from Private to President. In war or peace I bring them home and lay them gently down in fields of honor.

Provisioner, transporter. In 1898 I took you to Havana harbor and the Philippines. I brought you tents, your khaki cloth for uniforms. When yellow fever struck, I brought the mattresses you lay upon.

In 1918, soldier... like you. Pearl Harbor, too. Mine was the first blood spilled that day. I jumped in darkness into Normandy, D-Day plus 1. Bataan, North Africa, Sicily. I was there. The 'chutes that filled the gray Korean skies were mine; I led the endless trains across the beach in Vietnam.

By air and sea I supported the fight for Grenada. Helicopters above the jungles of Panama carried my supplies. In Desert Storm, I was there when we crossed the border into Iraq...sustaining combat and paying the ultimate sacrifice as we liberated Kuwait.

I AM QUARTERMASTER. I can shape the course of combat, change the outcome of battle. Look to me: Sustainer of Armies...Since 1775.

I AM QUARTERMASTER. I AM PROUD.

== Military Order of Saint Martin ==
The Quartermaster Corps established this private order on 7 February 1997. The emblematic figure is of Saint Martin of Tours. The medal, for Quartermasters either on Active Duty, in the Reserves, or Civilian status, is awarded in three grades:

- Ancient Order of Saint Martin (gold medallion)
- Distinguished Order of Saint Martin (silver medallion)
- Honorable Order of Saint Martin (bronze medallion)

An updated list of recipients is maintained on the Association of Quartermasters website.

The Military Order of Saint Martin is awarded by the Association of Quartermasters and not the United States Army.

== Insignia ==
- The Regimental Insignia was authorized in 1986 and revised in 1994 to the current insignia. The insignia is described as a gold color metal and enamel device 1 inch in height consisting of a gold eagle with wings spread and head lowered looking to his right and standing upon a wheel with a blue felloe set with thirteen gold stars, having thirteen gold spokes and the hub white with a red center; superimposed on the wheel a gold sword and key crossed diagonally hilt and bow up, all on a black background and resting upon a wreath of green laurel terminating at either side below the eagle's wings at the upper end of the sword and key. Attached below the device is a gold scroll inscribed SUPPORTING VICTORY in black. The original regimental insignia was all gold and approved on 31 March 1986. The design was changed on 7 June 1994 to add color to the insignia. The Regimental DUI is worn on the Soldier's right side above the name tag and any unit awards on the Army Service Uniform.
- The Branch Insignia was approved in its present form in 1913. The sword is characteristic of military forces and symbolized the Quartermaster Corps control of military supplies. The key is representative of the Corps traditional storekeeping function. The wheel is styled after a six-mule-wagon wheel and represents transportation and delivery of supplies. The wheel has thirteen spokes, a red and white hub, and a blue felloe (the outer edge of the wheel) embedded with thirteen gilt (gold) stars. The thirteen stars and spokes of the wheel represent the original colonies and the origin of the Corps which occurred during the Revolutionary War. The gilt (gold) eagle is the national bird and is symbolic of our nation. The colors red, white, and blue are the national colors. The Branch Insignia is worn on the lapel of the Army Service Uniform, singly on a brass disk for Enlisted personnel and in pairs for Officers.

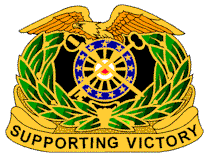
Current Regimental Insignia

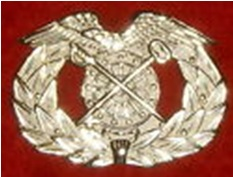
Initial Regimental Insignia

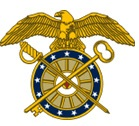
Branch Insignia as worn by Quartermaster Officers

Unit Insignia:

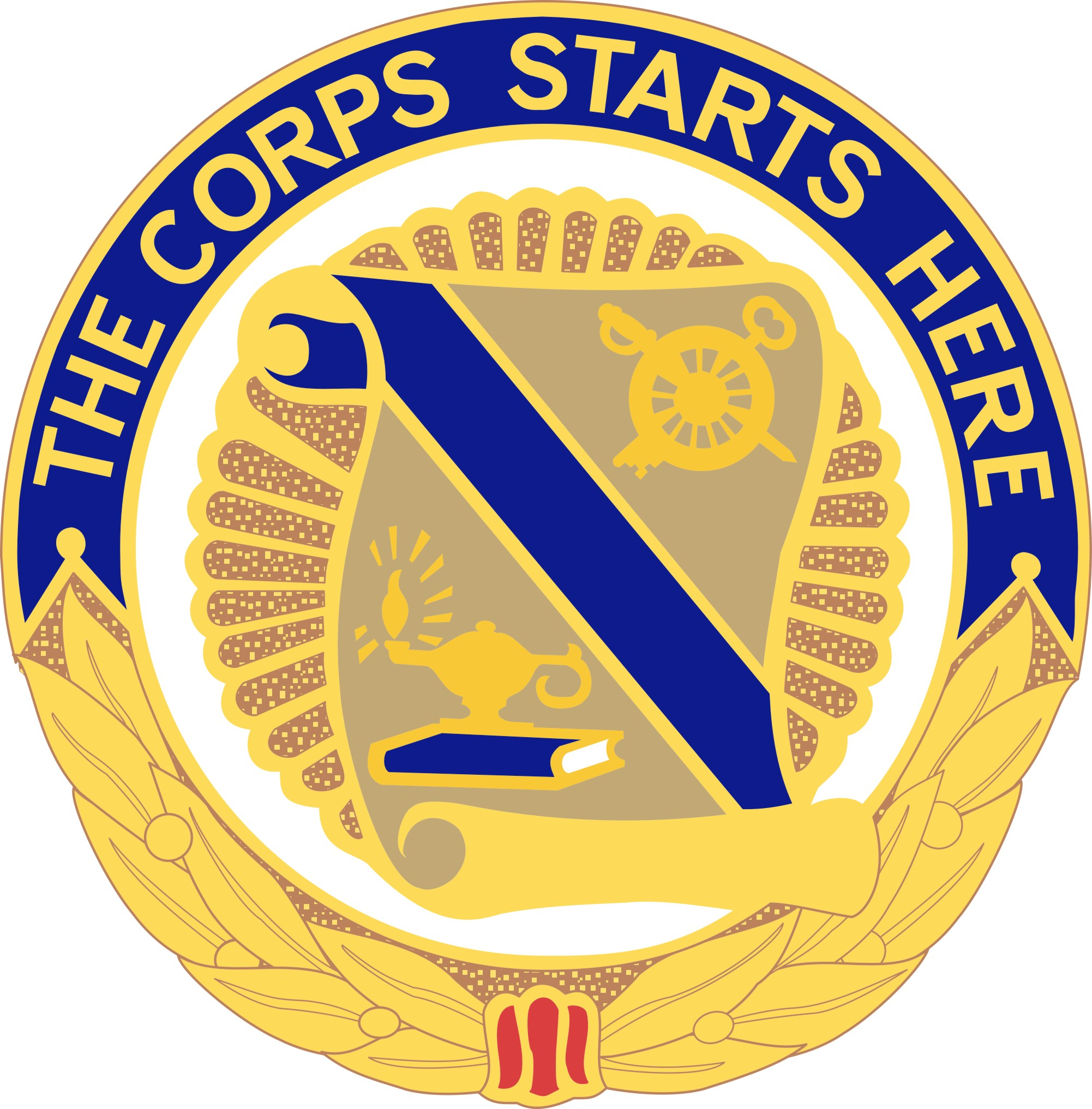
23rd Quartermaster Brigade
"The Corps Starts Here"

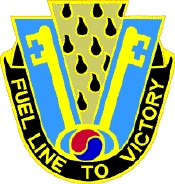
2nd Quartermaster Group
"Fuel Line to Victory"

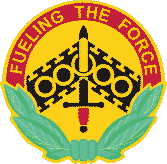
49th Quartermaster Group
"Fueling the Force"

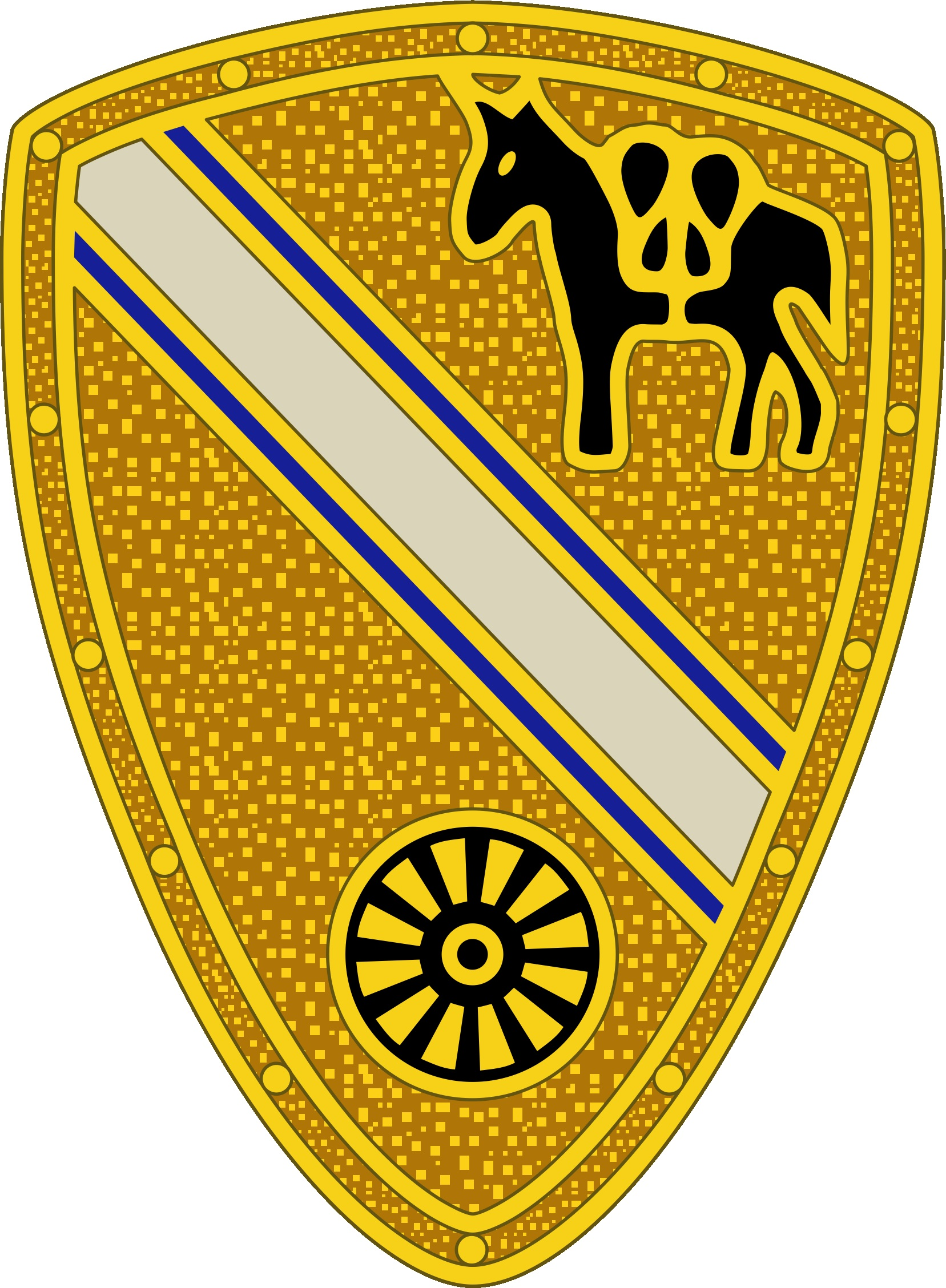
16th Quartermaster Squadron

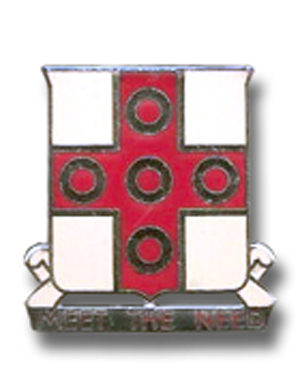
56th Quartermaster Battalion
"Meet the Need"

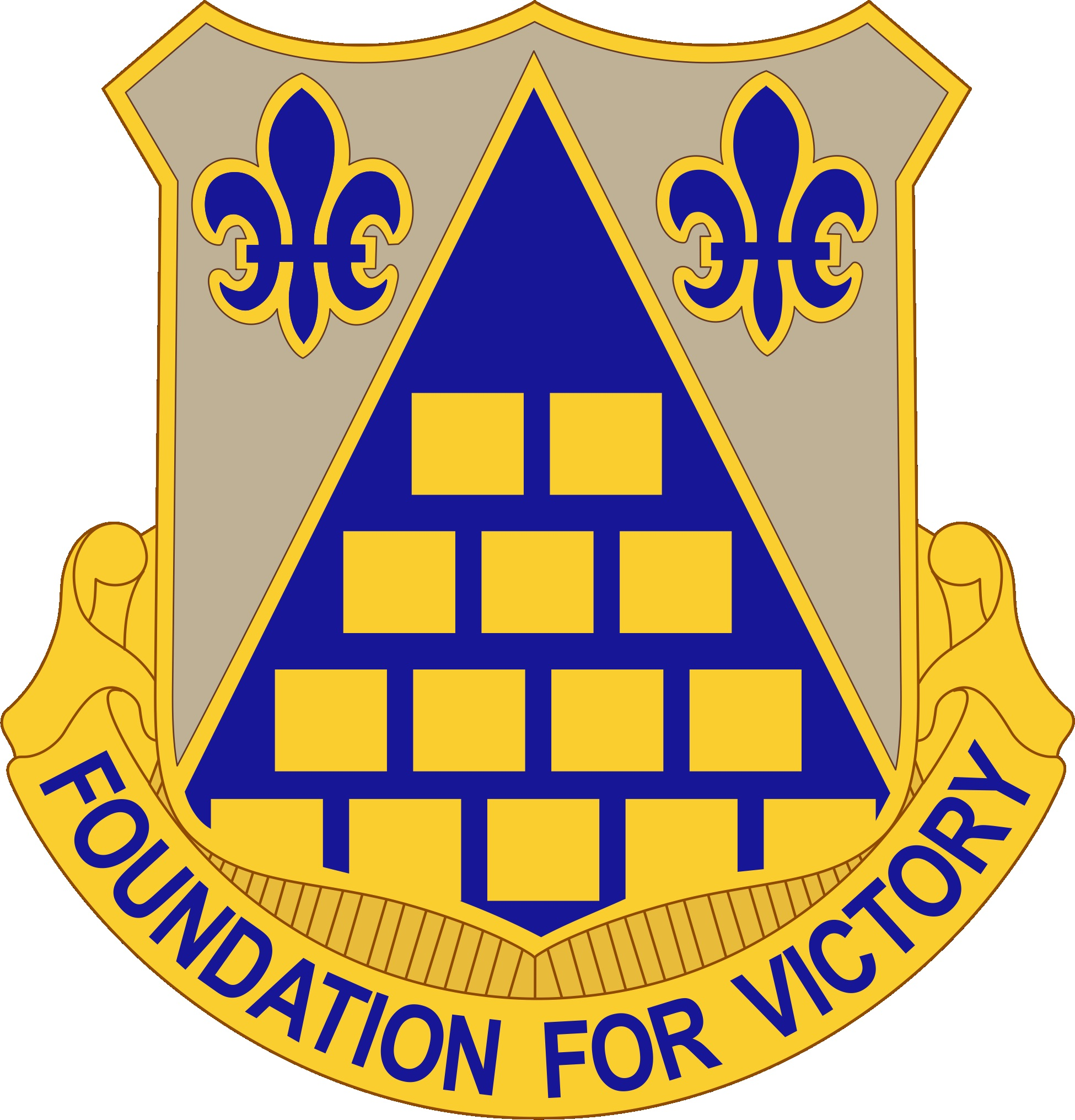
61st Quartermaster Battalion
"Foundation for Victory"

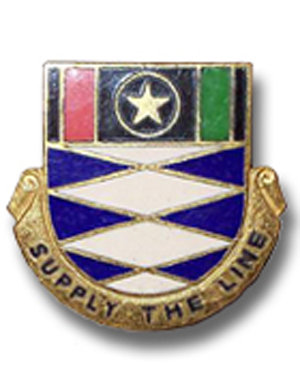
95th Supply and Services Battalion
"Supply the Line"

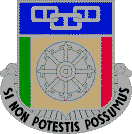
244th Quartermaster Battalion
"Si Non Potestis Possumus"

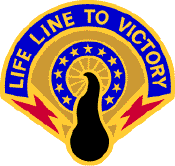
262nd Quartermaster Battalion
"Lifeline to Victory"

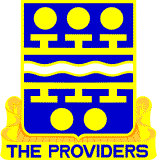
266th Quartermaster Battalion
"The Providers"

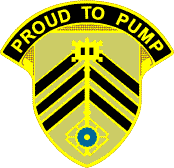
505th Quartermaster Battalion
"Proud to Pump"

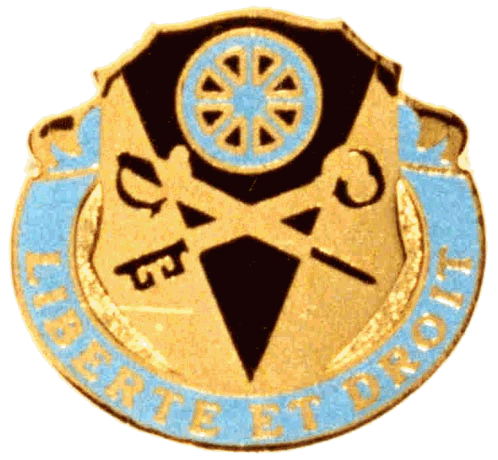
554th Quartermaster Battalion
"Liberte et Droit"

== See also ==
- Culinary specialist (United States Navy)
- Military supply
- Quartermaster Center and School
- Quartermaster Corps
- Quartermaster general
- Army Quartermaster Museum
- People's Liberation Army Joint Logistics Support Force
