= Battle of Nasiriyah =

Battle during the 2003 U.S. invasion of Iraq

Coordinates: 31°03′N 46°16′E

- Part of the 2003 invasion of Iraq
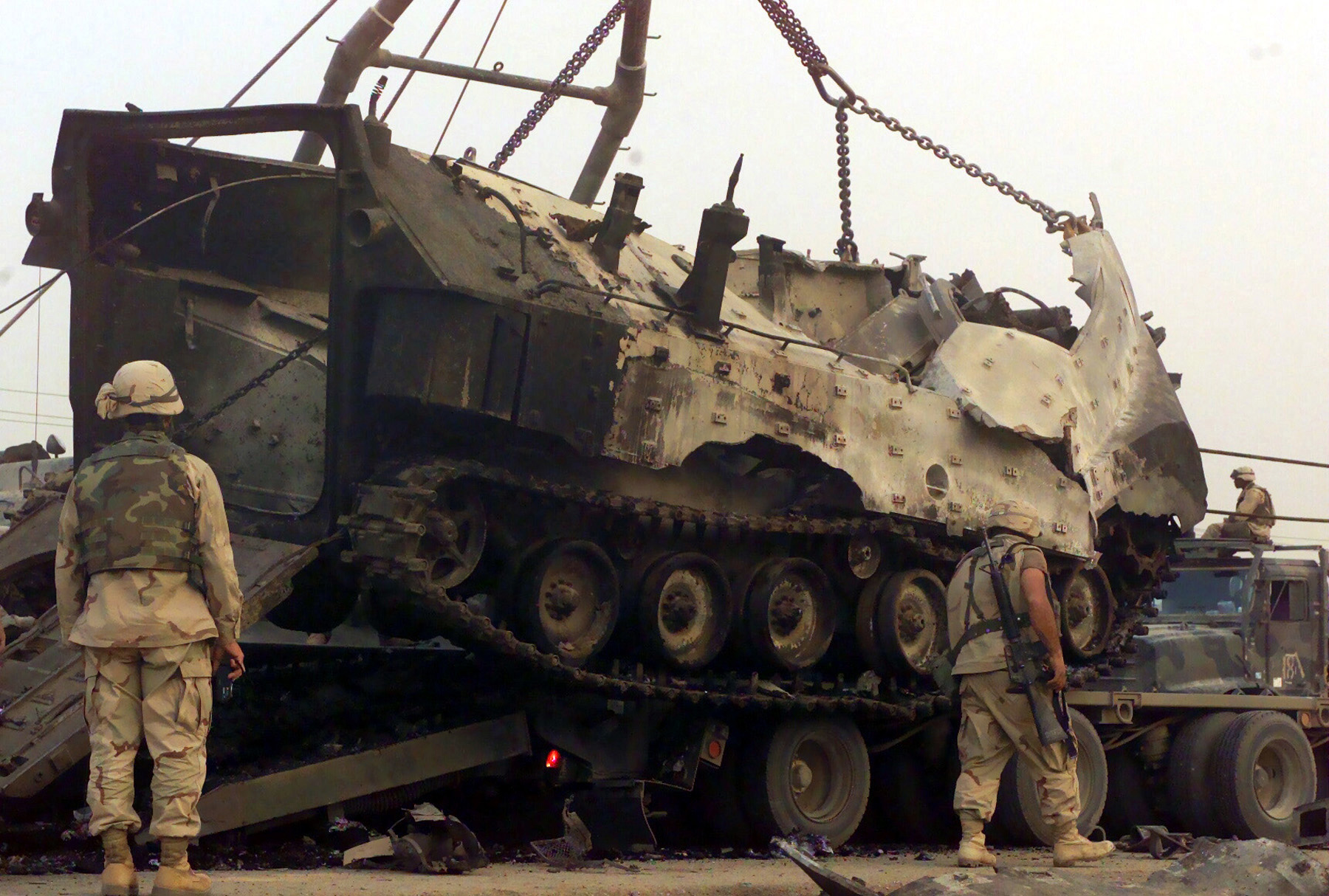
- A USMC Assault Amphibious Vehicle destroyed at Nasiriyah, Iraq, in a maintenance area. 11 April 2003.
Date	23 March – 2 April 2003 (2 weeks and 5 days)
Location	Nasiriyah, Iraq
Result	Coalition victory

Belligerents
United States; United Kingdom	Iraq

Commanders and leaders
(United States) Richard Natonski (United Kingdom) Jim Dutton	Nuri Daud Mishal (Iraq Army Third Corps commander) (Ba'athist Iraq) Adil Abdullah Mahdi (Ba'ath Party regional commander)

Units involved
3rd Infantry Division; 1st Marine Division; 2nd Marine Expeditionary Brigade; U.S. Air Force; Pennsylvania Air National Guard (United Kingdom) G Parachute Battery, 7th Parachute Regiment RHA (United Kingdom) Pathfinder Platoon	(Ba'athist Iraq) Iraqi 3rd Corps: (Ba'athist Iraq) 6th Armored Division (Ba'athist Iraq) 11th Infantry Division (Ba'athist Iraq) 51st Mechanized Division

Casualties and losses
32 killed 60 wounded 6 captured 8 AAVs destroyed 15+ vehicles destroyed	359–431 killed 300+ captured 1,000+ wounded

The Battle of Nasiriyah was fought between the US 2nd Marine Expeditionary Brigade and Iraqi forces from 23 March to 2 April 2003 during the US-led invasion of Iraq. On the night of 24–25 March, the bulk of the Marines of Regimental Combat Team 1 passed through the city over the bridges and attacked north towards Baghdad. Other elements remained in the city to fight its defenders, who put up stiff resistance and inflicted several dozen casualties on coalition forces, more than in most other battles during the invasion. Resistance ceased on 1 April.

== The battle ==
=== Prelude ===
The city of Nasiriyah lies along the banks of the Euphrates River in Dhi Qar Province, about 225 mi (362 km) southeast of Baghdad; its population is made up almost entirely of Shia Muslims.

In 2003, Nasiriyah was the headquarters of the Iraqi Army's 3rd Corps, composed of the 11th Infantry Division (ID), 51st Mechanized Infantry Division, and 6th Armored Division—all at around 50 percent strength. The 51st operated in the south covering the oilfields, and the 6th was north near Al Amarah, which left three brigade-sized elements of the 11th ID to guard the An Nasiriyah area.

The coalition planned to have 2nd Marine Expeditionary Brigade, dubbed Task Force Tarawa, to take and hold the two bridges inside Nasiriyah, creating a corridor for the RCT1 and 6th Engineer Support Battalion from Battle Creek, Michigan, to pass north through the city along Route 7.

=== U.S. Army convoy ambushed ===
On the morning of 23 March, a US Army supply convoy from the 507th Maintenance Company had mistakenly veered off Highway 8 and then turned toward the city into enemy-held territory. The US vehicles ran into an ambush, drawing enemy fire from every direction. Eleven American soldiers were killed and several were taken prisoner. However, a few soldiers managed to escape the ambush and form a screen around their wounded. They were soon rescued by a company from the 2nd MEB under the command of Major William Peeples.

At around 06:00 on the morning of 23 March, an 18-vehicle convoy of 31 soldiers of the United States Army's 507th Maintenance Company and two soldiers of the 3rd Forward Support Battalion of the 3rd Infantry Division missed a turn onto Highway 8 and mistakenly continued along Highway 7 into the city. The convoy was led by Captain Troy King, a supply officer with little combat training. Iraqi technical vehicles began shadowing the convoy as it passed an Iraqi checkpoint near the Euphrates River. After passing the Al-Quds headquarters on the northern outskirts of the city, King realized that he was lost and the convoy began turning around to retrace its steps through the city.

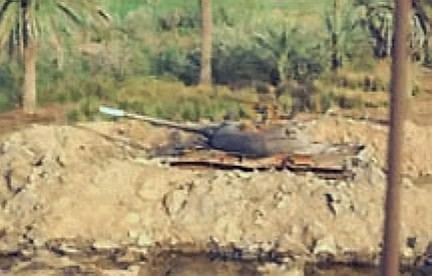
Iraqi Type 69-QM tank destroyed near Nasiriyah hospital

As the convoy turned left on to Highway 16, at about 07:00, it began to receive sporadic small arms fire, the source and direction of which could not be determined. The ambush was unlikely to have been set up in advance, because the Iraqis did not know which course the convoy would take. In the resulting chaos, the 507th became divided into three smaller groups as it attempted to move south, out of Nasiriyah. The first element of the convoy (known in the official U.S. Army report as Group 1) made it through unscathed, and continued south to meet up with the Marines. Group 2 also made it through the kill zone, although their vehicles were badly damaged and had to be abandoned. Group 3 encountered road barriers and was defeated.

At least 15 of the 18 American transport vehicles in the convoy, ranging from Humvees to Heavy Expanded Mobility Tactical Trucks (HEMTTs), were destroyed by small-arms fire, RPGs, mortar rounds, and tank gunfire. Some of them swerved off the road or crashed while attempting to avoid incoming Iraqi fire. One truck was crushed by the traversing 105 mm gun barrel of a Type 69-QM tank. A second truck was lost when it lurched to avoid the tank, veered off the road and overturned. The driver and co-driver of both vehicles were killed.

At 07:30, King's three remaining vehicles made contact with the tanks of Major Bill Peeples' Alpha Company, 8th Tank Battalion on Highway 7, about 10 kilometers (6.2 miles) south of Nasiriyah. On their approach to the city, one of Peeples' tankers noticed American vehicles in the road ahead. Peeples ordered his tanks forward to rescue as many soldiers as possible. They rolled up on ten survivors from Group 2 which had also managed to escape the ambush and set up a hasty perimeter about 5 km (3.1 mi) south of the city.

In total, 11 soldiers from the 507th had been killed, while six others were captured, including Private First Class Jessica Lynch, Specialist Shoshana Johnson and Private First Class Lori Piestewa. Piestewa died of her wounds soon afterward. After a delay, the Marines of 1st Battalion, 2nd Marines (part of 2nd Marine Expeditionary Brigade), attacked Nasiriyah from the south, using Assault Amphibious Vehicle (AAVs) and Cobra gunships. During this action, the Marines captured two bridges spanning the Euphrates River that were defended by Fedayeen Saddam and Ba'ath Party guerrilla troops. In heavy fighting, several Iraqi platoon-sized units, two ZSU-23-4 "Shilka" anti-aircraft weapons and several mortar and artillery positions were destroyed by a combined force of M1 Abrams tanks, Cobra helicopter gunships, and the artillery of 1st Battalion, 10th Marines.

=== Ambush Alley ===
The bloodiest day of the operations for the Marines was 23 March, when 18 men assigned to the 60mm Mortar Section, Weapons Platoon, Charlie Company, 1st Battalion, 2nd Marines, were killed and eight Amphibious Assault Vehicles were disabled in heavy fighting with Iraqi forces around the Saddam Canal. The Marines were engaged by RPGs, mortar, and artillery fire, as well as four Iraqi tanks hidden behind a building.

A friendly-fire incident occurred when two A-10s from the Pennsylvania Air National Guard strafed the Amphibious Assault Vehicles of Charlie Company by mistake, killing at least one Marine, and possibly as many as 17 Marines, over the course of multiple passes.

The A-10 strike was cleared by the battalion's forward air controller, who was with Bravo Company, bogged down on the eastern outskirts of the city. He did not have contact with Charlie Company and was unaware that Marines were so far north. An investigation into the friendly-fire episode confirmed that friendly-fire was to blame, but "like most friendly-fire investigations, it was done... with no enthusiasm for determining what really happened, or who should be held accountable." Videotapes from the A-10 planes went missing. Despite the clear findings, the U.S. Central Command issued a press release which both minimized certainty and the role of friendly-fire.

Two other Marines, from the 6th Engineer Support Battalion, Corporal Evans James and Sgt. Bradley S. Korthaus drowned while trying to cross the Saddam Canal under fire the following day. Sgt. Michael E. Bitz, from the Marine Air Control Group 28, died from hostile fire while tending to wounded Marines.

=== RCT-1 pushes through Ambush Alley ===
The advance of Regimental Combat Team 1 (RCT-1) through Nasiriyah was delayed by fighting there. On the evening of 24 March, LAV-25s of the 2nd Light Armored Reconnaissance Battalion (2nd LAR, commanded by Lt. Col. Eddie Ray) pushed north of the Saddam Canal, leading RCT-1 through Ambush Alley.

Meanwhile, the 3rd Battalion, 1st Marines (the "Thundering Third", commanded by Lt. Col. Lewis Craparotta) held open Ambush Alley as the rest of RCT-1 passed through Nasiriyah on the night of 24–25 March.

Partly as a result of RCT-1's delay, Colonel Joe Dowdy was later relieved of command of RCT-1.

=== Aftermath ===
By 27 March, most Iraqi resistance in the city had been subdued and the focus of the battle shifted from full combat to cordon-and-search operations. Small groups of Fedayeen Saddam militia were hiding throughout the city and launched sporadic attacks on Marine patrols with small arms and RPGs. These attacks were uncoordinated and the resulting firefights were lop-sided, with large numbers of militiamen killed.

On the morning of 27 March, two recon Marines found a sunken M1A1 tank at the bottom of the river. The tank had been missing since the night of 24–25 March. It had apparently plunged into the river when it drove through a gap where a sidewalk was under construction, causing the exposed reinforcing bar to crumble under the weight. The entire four-man crew died. Navy Seabee divers from Underwater Construction Team TWO, part of Task Force MIKE along with Marines from 1st Tank Battalion, spent two days retrieving the flooded tank and the bodies of the four crewmen that were found inside.

According to a captain in the Republican Guard, morale among Republican Guard units was bolstered by the resistance offered by the regular army's 45th brigade in the city.

Iraqi casualties were 359–431 dead. More than 300 were wounded and 1,000 captured. US losses were 32 dead, 60 wounded, and six captured.

=== Private First Class Jessica Lynch ===
Initial reporting of the battle emphasized the supposed heroism of Private First Class Jessica Lynch. On 3 April, The Washington Post ran a front-page story which read: "Lynch, a 19-year-old supply clerk, continued firing at the Iraqis even after she sustained multiple gunshot wounds and watched several other soldiers in her unit die around her". The Post quoted an unnamed official who said "She was fighting to the death [...] She did not want to be taken alive."

This description soon was questioned. On 4 April, the Associated Press ran a story which stated that Lynch's father had heard from the doctors attending her, who said that "she had not been shot or stabbed during her ordeal." On 15 April, the Post ran a story questioning the accuracy of its own account from 3 April, saying "Lynch's story is far more complex and different than those initial reports [...] She was neither shot nor stabbed."

On 24 April, Private Lynch testified before Congress. She called the earlier reports a "lie", and said that she had in fact never fired her weapon, because she was knocked unconscious when her vehicle crashed. Jon Krakauer concludes that "most of the details of Lynch's ordeal were extravagantly embellished, and much of the rest was invented from whole cloth... and [were] fed to gullible reporters by anonymous military sources". Krakauer concludes that Jim Wilkinson was likely part of a White House-led effort to fabricate Lynch's story.

== Participating units ==
=== U.S. military ===
- 2nd Marine Expeditionary Brigade
  - Regimental Combat Team 2
    - 1st Battalion, 2nd Marines
    - 2nd Battalion, 2nd Marines
    - 3rd Battalion, 2nd Marines
    - 2nd Battalion, 8th Marines
    - 1st Battalion, 10th Marines
- 1st Marine Division
  - Regimental Combat Team 1
    - 3rd Battalion, 1st Marines
    - 1st Battalion, 4th Marines
    - 2nd Battalion, 23rd Marines
    - 2nd Battalion, 25th Marines
    - 2nd Light Armored Reconnaissance Battalion (attached)

=== British Army ===
- G Parachute Battery, 7th Parachute Regiment Royal Horse Artillery
- Pathfinder Platoon

=== Ba'athist Iraqi forces ===
- Iraqi Army 11th Division
  - 23rd Brigade
  - 45th Brigade
  - 47th Brigade
  - 21st Tank Regiment (elements)
  - Unidentified Commando battalion
- Fedayeen Saddam paramilitary forces
- Al Quds Army

== In popular culture ==
- The Battle of Nasiriyah is featured in the 2008 HBO miniseries Generation Kill, in episode 2, "The Cradle of Civilization".
- The ambush of the 507th Maintenance Company was re-created at the beginning of the 2003 NBC television film Saving Jessica Lynch. The ongoing Battle of Nasiriyah is the backdrop for the rest of the events of the film.
- Much of playwright and Iraq War veteran Sean Huze's play The Sandstorm draws on his experiences and those of his comrades during and immediately following their unit's (2nd LAR) involvement in the Battle of Nasiriyah.
- The Battle of Nasiriyah was cited as a major factor in a Marine's PTSD in episode 2 of the 2010 PBS series This Emotional Life.

== See also ==
- Justin LeHew – One of the most highly decorated U.S. military personnel serving in the war on terror. Recipient of the Navy Cross for his action during the Battle of Nasiriyah in 2003. Recipient of the Bronze Star Medal with Valor device for his actions during the Battle of Najaf in 2004.
- Luis Fonseca – A United States Navy Hospital Corpsman, who was awarded the Navy Cross for his actions during the battle.

== Bibliography ==
- "The battle of an Nasiriyah". Marine Corps Gazette. 87 (9): 40, 42, 44, 46. September 2003. 411172841ProQuest 221424233.
- Dunfee, David R. (March 2004). "Ambush Alley Revisited". Marine Corps Gazette. 88 (3): 44–46. 583358751ProQuest 221454329.
- Lowry, Richard S. (2006). Marines in the Garden of Eden: The Battle for An Nasiriyah. Berkley Hardcover. ISBN 0-425-20988-1.
- Livingston, Gary (2004). An Nasiriyah: The Fight for the Bridges. Caisson Press. ISBN 1-928724-04-3.
- Pritchard, Tim (2007). Ambush Alley: The Most Extraordinary Battle of the Iraq War. Presidio Press. ISBN 978-0-89141-911-2.
