= Patrick Miller (soldier) =

United States Army soldier

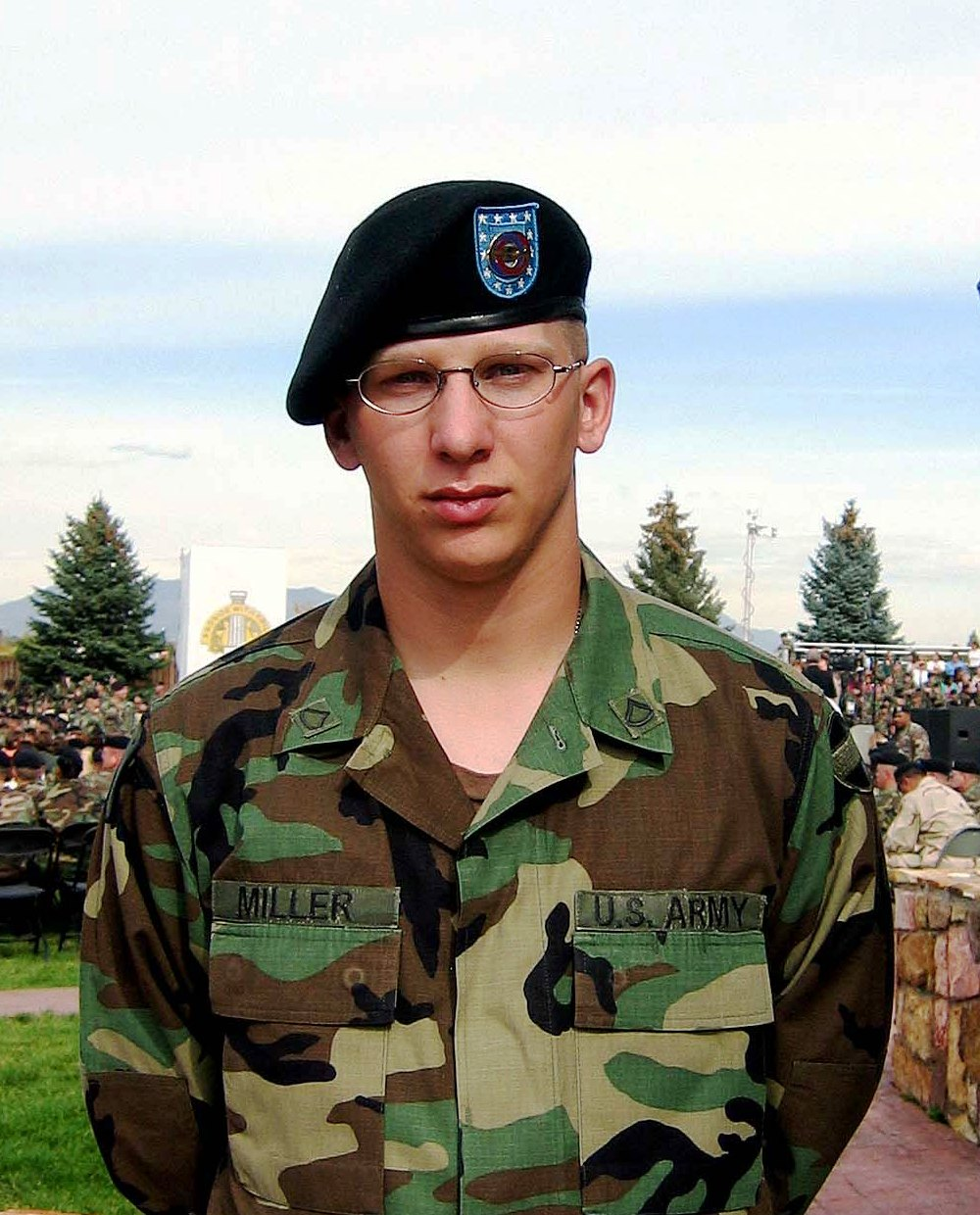
- Miller in 2003
- Born: January 15, 1980 (age 46); Newton, Kansas, U.S.
- Military career
- Allegiance: United States
- Branch: United States Army
- Service years: 2002–2022
- Rank: Sergeant first class
- Units: 507th Maintenance Company
- Conflicts: Afghanistan War; Operation Enduring Freedom; Iraq War; Invasion of Iraq (POW)
- Awards: Silver Star; Purple Heart; Army Commendation Medal; Army Achievement Medal; Prisoner of War Medal

Patrick Wayne Miller (born January 15, 1980) is a retired United States Army soldier. He was a private first class during the 2003 invasion of Iraq with the 507th Maintenance Company, serving as a mechanic and becoming a prisoner of war. For his actions leading up to his capture, he was awarded the Silver Star for valor. He retired from the United States Army in August 2022.

== Early life and education ==
Miller is a 1998 graduate of Valley Center High School in Valley Center, Kansas, a town of 5,000 people outside Wichita. Employed in civilian life as a welder, he joined the U.S. Army in the summer of 2002 to help pay for his student loans.

== Military career ==
=== 2003: 507th ambush ===
On March 23, 2003, Iraqi forces ambushed the trail convoy element of the 507th Maintenance Company that had taken a wrong turn near An Nasiriyah. There had been bitter fighting around Nasiriyah, a vital crossing point of the River Euphrates. Miller was driving the last truck in the convoy with Private First Class Brandon Sloan and Sergeant James Riley as passengers. During the attack, he floored the accelerator, trying to steer and duck bullets at the same time. Iraqi fire killed Sloan and damaged his truck's transmission, disabling the vehicle.

Prior to his capture, Miller had stood his ground firing at the Iraqis with a malfunctioning weapon, feeding bullets into it by hand to protect two wounded comrades. A U.S. Army press release said Miller jumped from his vehicle and began firing on a mortar position that he believed was about to open fire on his convoy. For these actions he was awarded the Silver Star, the third-highest military award for heroism in combat.

Miller was held for 22 days with four other members of his unit including:

- Spc. Edgar Hernandez – Mission, Texas.
- Spc. Joseph Hudson – Alamogordo, New Mexico.
- Spc. Shoshana Johnson – El Paso, Texas.
- Sgt. James Riley – Pennsauken, New Jersey,
- Pvt. Jessica Lynch – Palestine, West Virginia. Part of same unit but held separately in a different location

After he was captured, Miller was repeatedly questioned about radio frequencies that were written on pieces of paper inside his helmet. "Thinking on his feet, Pfc. Miller told his captors that they were prices for power steering pumps," the release said. "Disgusted, the captors threw the frequencies and his helmet into the fire." He was one of five POWs to be interviewed on Al Jazeera. In the interview, he was asked why he came to Iraq, his reply was "I come to fix broke stuff." Asked if he came to shoot Iraqis, he answered, "No, I come to shoot only if I am shot at. They don't bother me, I don't bother them." Miller lost 25 pounds in three weeks as a prisoner of war, eating boiled chicken, rice and bread so hard he had to throw it against the wall to be able to chew it.

Miller received his Silver Star, along with a Purple Heart and Prisoner of War Medal, on July 2, 2003, during an Independence Day celebration at Fort Bliss, Texas. On 20 July 2005, while serving with the 183rd Maintenance Company, Fort Carson, Miller was awarded the Combat Action Badge by retired Command Sergeant Major Tyler Walker.

The U.S. Army Materiel Command at Fort Belvoir, Virginia, named its operations center and dedicated a wall in Miller's honor in January 2004. Miller attended the ceremony with his mother and his wife and their two small children.

==== Silver Star citation ====
The President of the United States takes pleasure in presenting the Silver Star Medal to Patrick Miller, Private First Class, U.S. Army, for conspicuous gallantry and intrepidity in action while serving as a Mechanic with the 507th Maintenance Company, 11th Air Defense Artillery Brigade, during combat operations in support of Operation IRAQI FREEDOM, near An Nasiriya, Iraq, on 23 March 2003. On that date a huge American convoy headed from Kuwait to Baghdad. A dozen heavy trucks and other maintenance vehicles fell behind the rest and got lost. At sunrise, Iraqi troops ambushed the lost soldiers, firing from both sides of the highway. The Americans sped up to escape the attack, but one Humvee smashed into the back of a jack-knifed American tractor-trailer. Less than a mile behind that accident, Private Miller was driving the last truck in the convoy. During the attack, he floored the accelerator, trying to steer and duck bullets at the same time. During the ensuing battle he single-handedly stopped a mortar attack aimed at trapped soldiers.

=== After Iraq ===
After returning to Fort Bliss, Texas, Miller stayed on active duty with the U.S. Army and was transferred to Fort Carson, Colorado (2003–2008), Fort Riley, Kansas (2008–2012), and Fort Drum, New York (2012–2015). He deployed to Afghanistan as part of Operation Enduring Freedom in 2013 with HHC, 210th Brigade Support Battalion, 2nd Infantry Brigade Combat Team, 10th Mountain Division, (January – September 2013), Republic of Korea (2015–2016), and Fort Riley, Kansas (2016–2022). He retired from active duty as a sergeant first class in August 2022.
