= Sean Huze =

American actor, screenwriter and playwright

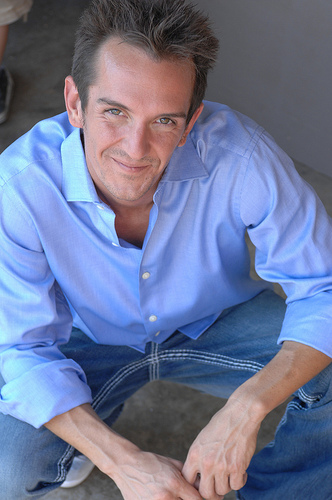
- 2010 photograph (USMC Iraq veteran, Playwright, Actor, Screenwriter, Film Producer)
- Born: January 18, 1975 (age 51); Greenwood, Mississippi, U.S.
- Website: seanhuze.com

Sean Huze (born January 18, 1975) is an American actor, screenwriter and playwright.

== Early life ==
Huze was born in Greenwood, Mississippi and grew up in Baton Rouge, Louisiana. He moved to Los Angeles, California in 1999 to pursue a career as an actor. He appeared in a few small television and independent film roles in 2000 and 2001 prior to enlisting in the US Marine Corps.

== Military career ==
In response to the September 11, 2001 attacks, Sean Huze enlisted in the United States Marine Corps. He reported October 30, 2001 to boot camp at Marine Corps Recruit Depot San Diego. After completing bootcamp and infantry training at Camp Pendleton, California he reported to his permanent duty station at Camp Lejeune, North Carolina, with 2nd Light Armored Reconnaissance Battalion (2D LAR). In February 2003, Huze deployed with his unit to Kuwait in preparation for the invasion of Iraq in March. He fought with his unit in the Battle of Nasiriyah. He completed one tour of duty in Iraq and received several medals and citations with the highest being the Navy and Marine Corps Achievement Medal during his enlistment. All of his writings to date deal with the subject of the 2003 Iraq War. He was discharged from the USMC in 2005.

== Film career ==
Huze returned to Los Angeles and co-produced his first play The Sandstorm which he had previously produced for a limited engagement in September 2004. The Los Angeles Times called it a "heart-clutching, eye-witness mosaic," and praised its "shocking force and awesome honesty," and it garnered a Critic's Pick from Back Stage West which stated simply that "it deserves to be seen and heard." D.C. theatre producer Charlie Fink saw the play while in Los Angeles on unrelated business. After seeing the performance that night he acquired rights to produce The Sandstorm's East Coast premiere. The Sandstorm debuted on the East Coast on August 20, 2005, in Alexandria, VA at MetroStage serving the Washington, D.C. area. The Sandstorm was an editor's pick in The Washington Post and praised by The Examiner, The Hill, Potomac Stages, Curtain Up D.C. and other D.C. periodicals. The Sandstorm has been produced in dozens of U.S. cities and was translated into German and was a radio-play in Germany in 2007. Huze's second play, Weasel premiered in 2005 as part of The Kennedy Center's "Page to Stage" festival. His third play, The Wolf premiered in Los Angeles, CA in March 2007.

Sean has also appeared in several feature films since returning to Los Angeles including the Paul Haggis written and directed drama, In the Valley of Elah with Tommy Lee Jones, John Erick Dowdle's horror film The Poughkeepsie Tapes, Paul Greengrass' Green Zone starring Matt Damon, and Paul Haggis' The Next Three Days, released November 19, 2010 and starring Russell Crowe.
