= 5th Battalion, 52nd Air Defense Artillery Regiment =

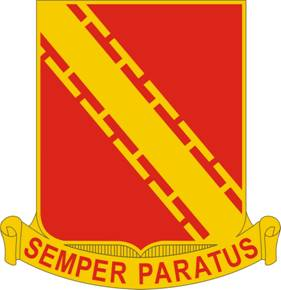
- Regimental insignia
- Active: 1916-1921, 1921-1944, 1950-1958, 1975-1988, 1996-present
- Country: United States
- Branch: United States Army
- Role: Air defense
- Size: Battalion
- Part of: 11th Air Defense Artillery Brigade
- Garrison/HQ: Fort Bliss, Texas, U.S.
- Nickname(s): Fighting Deuce; Team Deuce
- Motto(s): Always Prepared; We Build Warriors
- Equipment: MIM-104 Patriot; MIM-72 Chaparral (former); M163 Vulcan (former); M2 howitzer (former); M1888 (former)
- Engagements: Iraq War: Operation Iraqi Freedom
- Decorations: Meritorious Unit Citation

Commanders
- Battalion Commander: LTC Winterton
- Battalion Command Sergeant Major: CSM Washington

The 5th Battalion, 52nd Air Defense Artillery Regiment is an air defense artillery battalion in the United States Army based at Fort Bliss, Texas. The battalion is subordinate to the 11th Air Defense Artillery Brigade and the 32nd Army Air & Missile Defense Command (32nd AAMDC) and is part of the 52nd Air Defense Artillery Regiment.

The battalion consists of a Headquarters and Headquarters Battery (HHB), four Patriot missile batteries (A/5-52, B/5-52, C/5-52, and D/5-52) and a maintenance company (E Company, formerly the 507th Maintenance Company). Each battery has six Patriot missile launchers in accordance with the Patriot PAC-3 configuration.

== History ==
=== Invasion of Iraq ===
The battalion was split into three separate groups during Operation Iraqi Freedom. Batteries A, B, and E, along with the 507th Maintenance Company and HHB, 5-52d ADA, were assigned to 31st Air Defense Artillery Brigade, under Colonel Heidi Brown, the first female Patriot brigade commander, to provide air defense coverage for Coalition forces entering Iraq. Alpha, Bravo, Echo, and HHB batteries were provided security (prior to and during the invasion) by the Companies A and C of the 3d Battalion, 124th Infantry Regiment (Florida Army National Guard) from Kuwait to Baghdad. Batteries C and D were assigned to 32d AAMDC to provide air defense coverage for Kuwait.
Battery D, 5-52d ADA shot down the first Scud launched by Iraqi forces during the opening days of the invasion. Battery C, 5-52d ADA ended the war with the highest number of intercepted missiles totaling 3, battery C also shot down a British Tornado aircraft. During the invasion, Battery E was bombed by friendly aircraft outside of FARP shell, which created a 30-by-30-foot hole and damaged the radar system. A few days later, Battery E fired two PAC-3 missiles and shot down U.S. Navy F-18 pilot Nathan White outside of the Karbala (he avoided the first missile, but not the second one). He was found dead in one of the few lakes in Iraq. This friendly fire incident sidelined Battery E, allowing Batteries A and B, 5-52d ADA to be the first Patriot batteries in Baghdad, with Battery B preceding Battery A by a few hours.
The 507th Maintenance Company was ambushed during the rapid advance towards Baghdad. The unit made a wrong turn into Nasiriyah, northwest of Basra. The mistake was due to lack of rest, limited communications and human error according to a United States Army investigation. Several soldiers were killed and six were held as prisoners of war. Prior to invasion, 5-52d ADA had never conducted a bounding movement exercise to the extent Operation Iraqi Freedom required. In the summer of 2005, the 507th was inactivated and reflagged as Company E, 5-52d ADA, reflagged again later as Company F when the battalion received an Avenger battery that became Battery E, 5-52d ADA, during an Army-wide reorganization of Patriot battalions.

== Lineage ==
Organized 6 July 1916 in the Regular Army at Fort Washington, Maryland, as the 1st Company, Fort Washington [Maryland]

Reorganized and redesignated 6 July 1917 as Battery I, 8th Provisional Regiment, Coast Artillery Corps

Reorganized and redesignated 5 February 1918 as Battery I, 53d Artillery (Coast Artillery Corps)

Redesignated 15 July 1918 as Battery E, 52d Artillery (Coast Artillery Corps)

Inactivated 16 May 1921 at Fort Eustis, Virginia

Activated 18 August 1921 at Fort Eustis, Virginia

(Additionally designated 1 June 1922 as the 227th Company, Coast Artillery Corps; additional designation abolished 1 July 1924)

Redesignated 1 July 1924 as Battery E, 52nd Coast Artillery

Reorganized and redesignated 1 May 1943 as Battery A, 285th Coast Artillery Battalion

Inactivated 5 May 1944 at Camp Breckinridge, Kentucky

Disbanded 14 June 1944

Reconstituted 28 June 1950 in the Regular Army, consolidated with Battery A, 52d Field Artillery Battalion (active) (see ANNEX), and consolidated unit designated as Battery A, 52d Field Artillery Battalion, an element of the 24th Infantry Division

Inactivated 5 June 1958 and relieved from assignment to the 24th Infantry Division

Withdrawn 18 May 1959 from the Regular Army and allotted to the Army Reserve; concurrently redesignated as Headquarters and Headquarters Battery, 5th Automatic Weapons Battalion, 52d Artillery (organic elements concurrently constituted)

Redesignated 1 December 1971 as the 5th Automatic Weapons Battalion, 52d Air Defense Artillery

Redesignated 21 December 1975 as the 5th Battalion, 52d Air Defense Artillery; concurrently withdrawn from the Army Reserve, allotted to the Regular Army, assigned to the 24th Infantry Division, and activated at Fort Stewart, Georgia

Inactivated 16 November 1988 at Fort Stewart, Georgia, and relieved from assignment to the 24th Infantry Division

Activated 16 September 1996 at Fort Bliss, Texas

=== Annex ===
Constituted 1 October 1933 in the Regular Army as Battery A, 52d Field Artillery

Redesignated 26 August 1941 as Battery A, 52d Field Artillery Battalion, an element of the 24th Infantry Division

Activated 1 October 1941 at Schofield Barracks, Territory of Hawaii

== Campaign participation credit ==
(* after campaign designated Earned Participation Credit)

World War I

- Champagne-Marne*
- St. Mihiel*
- Meuse-Argonne*
- Champagne 1918*
- Lorraine 1918*

World War II

- Central Pacific*
- New Guinea (with arrowhead)*
- Leyte*
- Luzon*
- Southern Philippines (with arrowhead)*
- Central Europe*

Korean War

- UN Defensive*
- UN Offensive*
- CCF Intervention*
- First UN Counteroffensive*
- CCF Spring Offensive*
- UN Summer-Fall Offensive*
- Second Korean Winter*
- Korea, Summer-Fall 1952*

== Decorations ==
- Presidential Unit Citation (Army) for DEFENSE OF KOREA
- Philippine Presidential Unit Citation for 17 OCTOBER 1944 TO 4 JULY 1945
- Republic of Korea Presidential Unit Citation for PYONGTAEK
- Republic of Korea Presidential Unit Citation for KOREA 1952–1953
