= Rhonda Cornum =

Former United States Army officer who served in the Gulf War

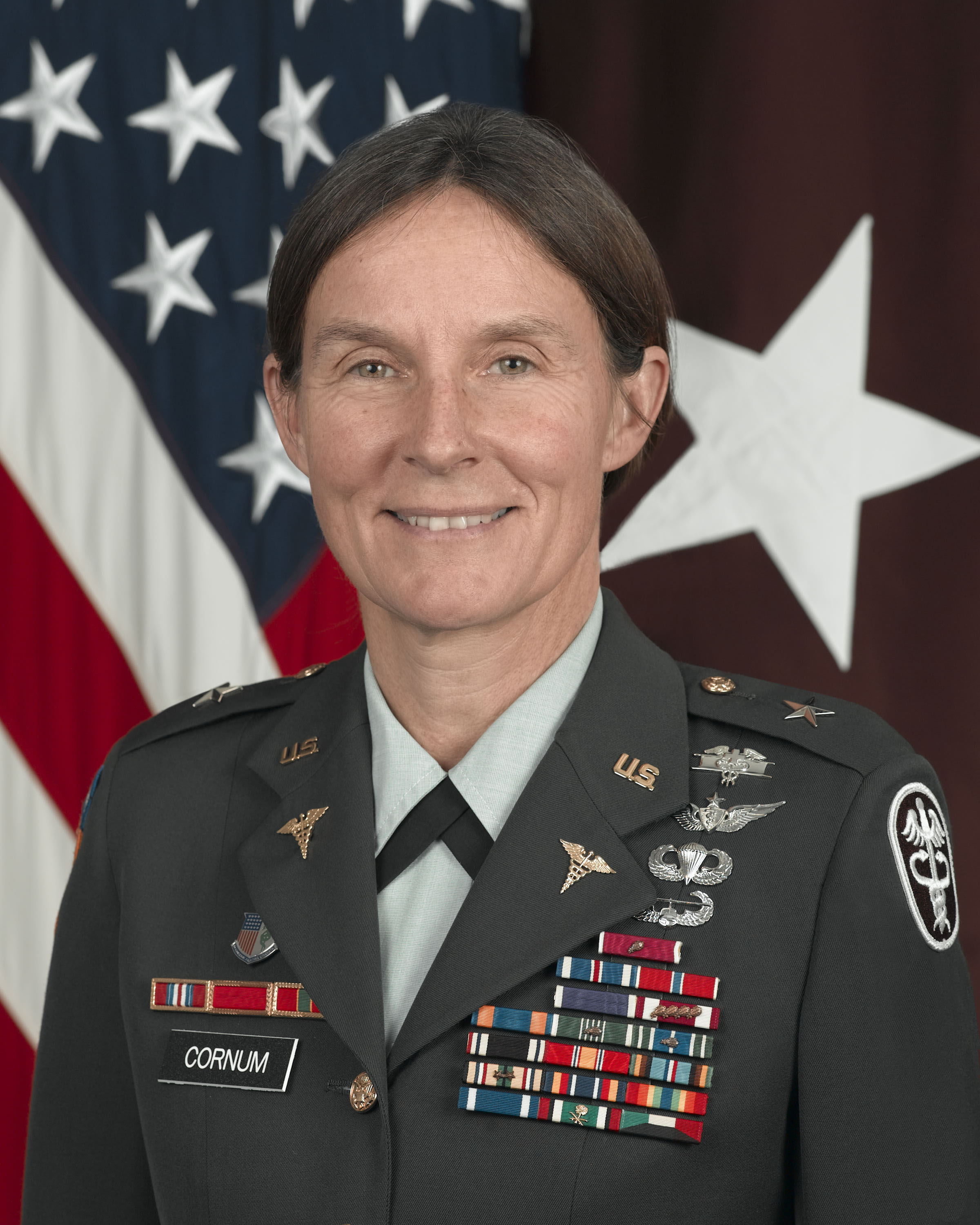
- Born: Rhonda Leah Scott; October 31, 1954 (age 71); Dayton, Ohio
- Spouse: Kory G. Cornum
- Military career
- Allegiance: United States
- Branch: United States Army
- Service years: 1978–2012
- Rank: Brigadier General
- Commands: Landstuhl Regional Medical Center
- Conflicts: Gulf War
- Awards: Army Distinguished Service Medal; Legion of Merit (3); Distinguished Flying Cross; Bronze Star Medal; Purple Heart

Rhonda L. Cornum (born October 31, 1954) is a retired United States Army officer and the Director of Health Strategy for TechWerks. She is a surgeon, board-certified in urology, having earned a doctorate in biochemistry and nutrition from Cornell University. Cornum worked at Letterman Army Institute of Research at the Presidio of San Francisco and entered the Uniformed Services University of the Health Sciences, Bethesda, Maryland, in 1982. She retired in 2012 as a brigadier general, the Director of Comprehensive Soldier Fitness in the Army Staff G-3/5/7 division.

She commanded the Landstuhl Regional Medical Center, was president of her class at the National War College, and then became the command surgeon for United States Army Forces Command. As a brigadier general, she was United States Army Assistant Surgeon General for Force Protection before working in the joint soldier fitness program. Cornum retired on January 31, 2012.

== Early life and education ==
After her training in biochemistry, Cornum attended the Uniformed Services University, the national military medical school. During her studies, she met her future husband, Kory Cornum, who would have a parallel military career in the United States Air Force and also attain the rank of brigadier general.

== Military career ==
At the United States Army Aviation Center, Cornum both researched and worked as a flight surgeon at the United States Army Aviation Center of Excellence. Her interests were focused on the human factors of flight.

=== Gulf War ===
As a flight surgeon with the 229th Attack Helicopter Regiment, then-Major Cornum was aboard a Black Hawk helicopter on a search and rescue mission, looking for a downed F-16 pilot, during the Gulf War. When the helicopter was shot down on February 27, 1991, she suffered two broken arms, a broken finger, a gunshot wound in the back, and other injuries. After regaining consciousness, she said her first thought was "Nobody's ever died from pain."

Cornum was captured, made a prisoner of war (POW), and sexually assaulted by one of her Iraqi captors. She was first taken to Basra and then held prisoner for a week in Baghdad and released on March 5, 1991. In addition, she was subjected, with other prisoners, to a mock execution. Nevertheless, when she was the senior-ranking prisoner, she took responsibility for other POWs. She later co-wrote a book about her experiences, She Went to War: The Rhonda Cornum Story (ISBN 0891415076), with Peter Copeland.

In an interview with the New York Times, Cornum said the sexual assault "ranks as unpleasant; that's all it ranks ... everyone's made such a big deal about this indecent assault, but the only thing that makes it indecent is that it was non-consensual. I asked myself, 'Is it going to prevent me from getting out of here? Is there a risk of death attached to it? Is it permanently disabling? Is it permanently disfiguring? Lastly, is it excruciating?' If it doesn't fit one of those five categories, then it isn't important." She continued, "there's a phenomenal amount of focus on this for the women but not for the men," citing the "mistreatment of [fellow POW] Major Jeffrey S. Tice of the Air Force, who had a tooth explode from its socket when he was tortured with jolts of electricity."

She testified about her treatment to the Presidential Commission on the Assignment of Women in the Armed Services. Initially, she did not mention this abuse, at the request of her chain of command, when first repatriated. She gave additional detail in her book.

Cornum resumed her military career after she returned to the United States. She also served as the staff urologist at Eisenhower Army medical Center at Fort Gordon, Georgia.

== Awards and decorations ==
Cornum's decorations include the Army Distinguished Service Medal, Legion of Merit with two oak leaf clusters, Distinguished Flying Cross, Bronze Star Medal, Meritorious Service Medal with four oak leaf clusters, Purple Heart, Air Medal, and Prisoner of War Medal. She is one of only seven women in history to receive the Distinguished Flying Cross.

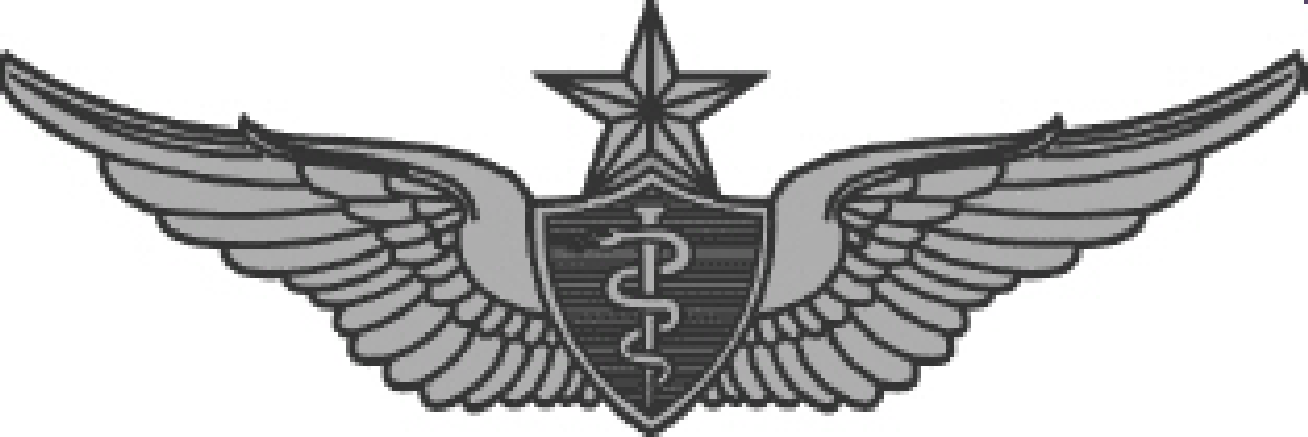

1st Badge	Expert Field Medical Badge		
2nd Badge	Senior Flight Surgeon Badge		
3rd Badge	Parachutist Badge		
4th Badge	Air Assault Badge		
1st Row	Army Distinguished Service Medal	Legion of Merit with two Oak Leaf Clusters	Distinguished Flying Cross
2nd Row	Bronze Star Medal	Purple Heart	Meritorious Service Medal with four Oak Leaf Clusters
3rd Row	Air Medal	Army Commendation Medal with Oak Leaf Cluster	Army Achievement Medal with two Oak Leaf Clusters
4th Row	Prisoner of War Medal	National Defense Service Medal with service star	Armed Forces Expeditionary Medal
5th Row	Southwest Asia Service Medal with two campaign stars	Global War on Terrorism Service Medal	Army Service Ribbon
6th Row	NATO Medal	Kuwait Liberation Medal (Saudi Arabia)	Kuwait Liberation Medal (Kuwait)
