= Lori Piestewa =

First Native American woman to die in combat in U.S. military history (1979–2003)

- Qötsa-Hon-Mana
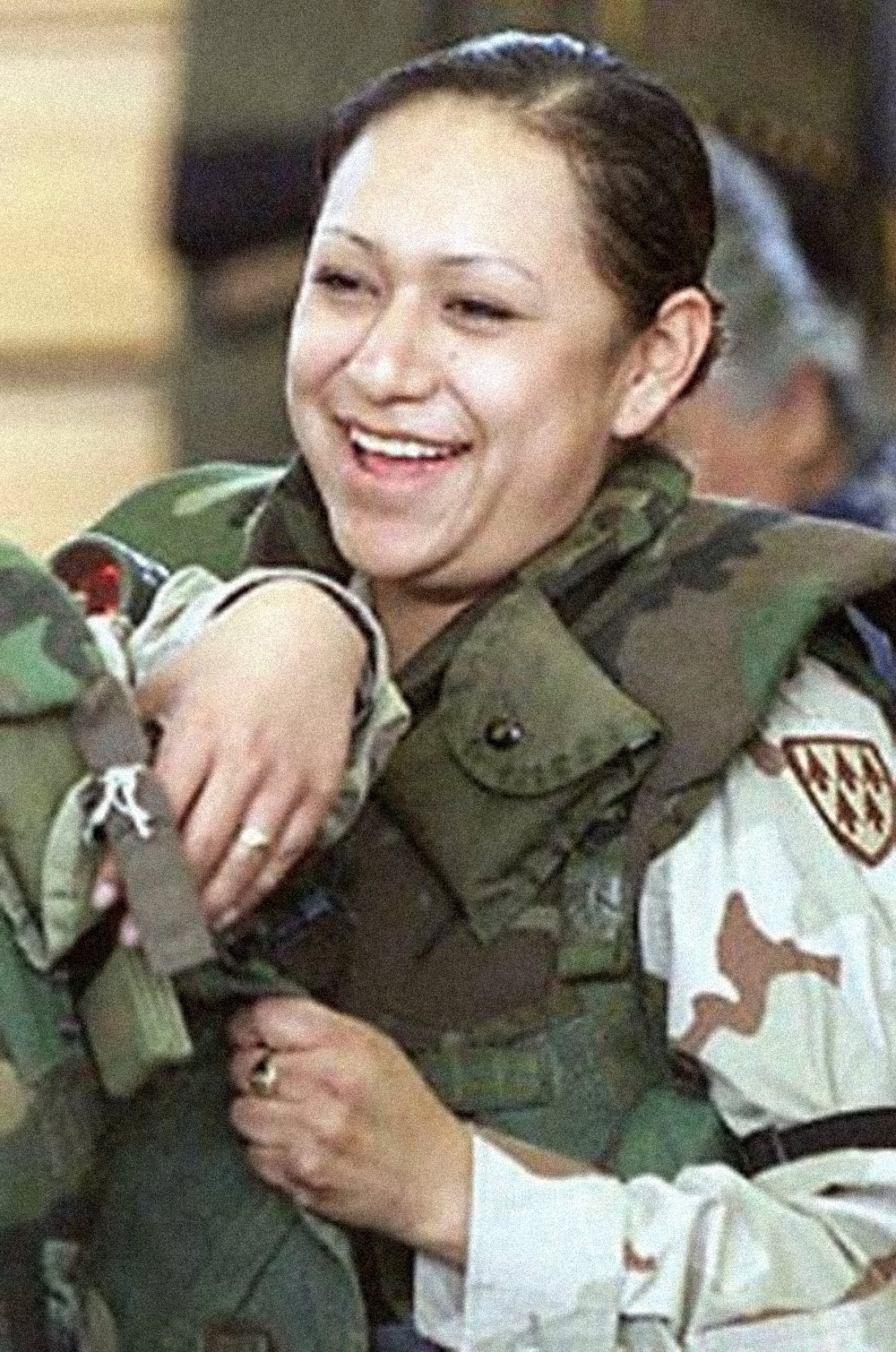
- Piestewa a few weeks before her death in 2003
- Born: December 14, 1979; Tuba City, Arizona, U.S.
- Died: March 23, 2003 (aged 23); Nasiriyah, Dhi Qar, Iraq
- Burial place: Tuba City Community Cemetery, Tuba City, Arizona, U.S.
- Military career
- Allegiance: United States
- Branch: United States Army
- Service years: 2001–2003
- Rank: Specialist (posthumous)
- Units: 507th Maintenance Company
- Conflicts: Iraq War; 2003 invasion of Iraq; Battle of Nasiriyah †
- Awards: Purple Heart; Prisoner of War Medal

Lori Ann Piestewa (/paɪˈɛstəwɑː/ py-ES-tə-wah; December 14, 1979 – March 23, 2003) was a United States Army soldier killed during the Iraq War. A member of the Quartermaster Corps, she died in the same Iraqi attack in which fellow soldiers Shoshana Johnson and Piestewa's friend Jessica Lynch were injured. A Hopi, Piestewa was the first Native American woman to die in combat while serving in the U.S. military and the first woman in the U.S. military killed in the Iraq War. Arizona's Piestewa Peak is named in her honor.

== Early life and education ==
Piestewa was born in Tuba City, Arizona, to Terry Piestewa and Priscilla "Percy" Baca. Her father is Hopi Native American and her mother is Mexican-American. The couple first met in 1964 and married in November 1968. The Piestewa family had a long military tradition; her paternal grandfather served in the U.S. Army in the European theatre of World War II, and her father Terry Piestewa was drafted in the U.S. Army in September 1965 and served a tour of duty in the Vietnam War before he returned home in March 1967. The Piestewa family resided in Tuba City, a town located on the Navajo Nation in Coconino County. As a child, she was given the Hopi name Qötsa-Hon-Mana (Hopi pronunciation: [ˈḵøt͡sa ˈhon ˈmana]; lit. 'White Bear Girl').

== Ambush in Nasiriyah, Iraq ==
Piestewa was a member of the US Army's 507th Maintenance Company, a support unit of maintenance and repair personnel. Her company was traveling in a convoy through the desert and was meant to bypass Nasiriyah, in southern Iraq, during the opening days of the war; but the convoy got lost and ran into an ambush in Nasiriyah on March 23, 2003.

As Piestewa came under "a torrent of fire" (in the words of an Army investigation of the battle) she drove at high speed, evading Iraqi fire until a rocket-propelled grenade hit her Humvee. The explosion sent her vehicle into the rear of a disabled tractor-trailer. Piestewa, Johnson, and Lynch all survived the crash with injuries, while three other soldiers in the Humvee died. They were taken prisoner along with four others, with Piestewa dying of her wounds soon after. A video of some of the American prisoners of war, including Piestewa (filmed shortly before she died in an Iraqi hospital), was later shown around the world on Al Jazeera television.

The families of soldiers in the 507th heard almost immediately of the ambush and fatalities in the unit. The Piestewa family saw people in her unit being interviewed by Iraqi TV, and for more than a week, families of the two women waited for news. All around Tuba City, signs were hung out telling people: "Put your porch light on, show Lori the way home." They used white stone to spell her name on a 200-foot-high mesa just outside the town.

== Legacy ==
Piestewa was awarded the Purple Heart and Prisoner of War Medal. The U.S. Army posthumously promoted her from private first class to specialist.

Lynch has repeatedly stated that Piestewa was the true heroine of the ambush and named her daughter Dakota Ann in honor of her fallen comrade. In addition, many entities have honored her memory with memorials. When Arizona's state government was deciding what to rename Squaw Peak in the Phoenix Mountains near Phoenix due to the former name's offensive nature, it was decided to rename it as Piestewa Peak to honor the Arizona native. This was codified by the U.S. Board on Geographic Names on April 10, 2008; the freeway that passes near this mountain was also renamed in her honor. In addition, Senator Tom Daschle honored her, as did Indian Nations across the United States. Since her death, the Grand Canyon State Games organizers have held an annual Lori Piestewa National Native American Games, which brings participants from across the country. A plaque bearing her name is also located at White Sands Missile Range in New Mexico, and Fort Bliss, Texas. She has also been memorialized with a plaque and ceremony at Mount Soledad Veterans Memorial in La Jolla, California. On November 10, 2011, American Legion Post No. 80 on the Hopi Reservation was renamed the Lori Piestewa Post # 80. On November 30, 2011, the Directorate of Training Sustainment headquarters at Fort Benning, Georgia was named Piestewa Hall in her honor.

Her death led to a rare joint prayer gathering between members of the Hopi and Navajo tribes, which have had a centuries-old rivalry. In 2018, Piestewa became one of the inductees in the first induction ceremony held by the National Native American Hall of Fame.

== See also ==
- Battle of Nasiriyah
