= 507th Maintenance Company =

- Disbanded: 16 July 2005; 21 years ago
- Country: United States
- Branch: United States Army
- Type: Army company
- Role: Military maintenance
- Part of: 11th Air Defense Artillery Brigade (2003)
- Garrison/HQ: Fort Bliss, Texas, U.S.
- Engagements: Iraq War: Operation Iraqi Freedom

Commanders
- Notable commanders: Troy Kent King (2003–2004)

The 507th Maintenance Company was a United States Army unit which was ambushed during the Battle of Nasiriyah in the rapid advance towards Baghdad during 2003 invasion of Iraq on 23 March 2003. The most well known member of the unit was Private First Class Jessica Lynch whose rescue from an Iraqi hospital received worldwide media coverage. Sergeant Donald Walters and Private First Class Patrick Miller were both awarded the Silver Star for valor. Sergeant Matthew Rose was awarded the Bronze Star Medal with "V" Device. Many other members of the unit were decorated as well, receiving the Bronze Star Medal, Purple Heart, and/or Prisoner of War Medal.

On 16 July 2005, the 507th Maintenance Company was redesignated as Battery E, 5th Battalion, 52d Air Defense Artillery Regiment. In 2006, A monument to the 507th Maintenance Company was placed within the battalion's area on Fort Bliss, Texas. In January 2007, the unit's designation was changed to Battery F.

== Overview ==
The 507th Maintenance Company provided maintenance support to 5th Battalion, 52nd Air Defense Artillery, a Patriot missile unit based at Fort Bliss, Texas. Previously, it was assigned to 2d Battalion, 7th Air Defense Artillery, 11th Air Defense Artillery Brigade, another Patriot missile unit at Fort Bliss which played a major support role in the Persian Gulf War. During its Iraq deployment in 2003, the 507th was attached to 31st Air Defense Artillery Brigade.

== History ==
=== 2003: Iraq War ===
==== The Battle of Nasiriyah ====
A trail vehicle convoy element of this unit was ambushed during the rapid advance towards Baghdad during Operation Iraqi Freedom on 23 March 2003. The 507th was last in a march column of over 600 vehicles from the 3rd Infantry Division. This element which included the heavier, slower vehicles of the 507th, made a wrong turn into Nasiriyah, a major crossing point over the Euphrates River northwest of Basra. A U.S. Army investigation concluded that this wrong turn was the result of a navigational error compounded by a lack of rest, limited communications and human error.

===== Killed in action =====
The following soldiers of the 507th Maintenance Company were killed in action:

Name	Rank	Age	Hometown	Notes
Jamaal R. Addison	Specialist	22	Roswell, Georgia	
Robert J. Dowdy	First sergeant	38	Cleveland, Ohio	First sergeant of the 507th Maintenance Company.
Ruben Estrella-Soto	Private	18	El Paso, Texas	
Howard Johnson II	Private first class	21	Mobile, Alabama	The first combat death from Alabama during Operation Iraqi Freedom. Posthumously awarded the Bronze Star and the Purple Heart.
James M. Kiehl	Specialist	22	Comfort, Texas	During the ambush, James Kiehl manned his vehicle's Squad Automatic Weapon (SAW) and did his duty to defend his unit, but was mortally injured. Posthumously awarded the Bronze Star Medal and the Purple Heart.
Johnny Villareal Mata	Chief warrant officer	35	Pecos, Texas	
Lori Piestewa	Private first class	23	Tuba City, Arizona	Captured alive, but succumbed to her injuries. The first Native American woman in history to die in combat while serving with the U.S. military. Posthumously awarded a Purple Heart and a Prisoner of War Medal.
Brandon Sloan	Private	19	Bedford Heights, Ohio	
Donald Walters	Sergeant	33	Kansas City, Missouri	Captured alive, but later summarily executed. Posthumously awarded the Purple Heart and the Silver Star for gallantry with marked distinction.

Two soldiers from the 3rd Forward Support Battalion of the 3rd Infantry Division, Specialist Edward J. Anguiano, 24, of Brownsville, Texas, and Sergeant George Edward Buggs, 31, of Barnwell, South Carolina, were also killed in action with the 507th Maintenance Company after falling back in the column to assist the 507th with vehicle recovery.

===== Prisoners of war =====
The following soldiers of the 507th Maintenance Company were captured and held as prisoners of war (POWs):

Name	Rank	Age	Hometown	Notes
Edgar Hernandez	Specialist	21	Mission, Texas	Awarded the Bronze Star Medal, Purple Heart, and Prisoner of War Medal.
Joseph Hudson	Specialist	23	Alamogordo, New Mexico	Awarded the Bronze Star Medal, Purple Heart, and Prisoner of War Medal.
Shoshana Johnson	Specialist	30	El Paso, Texas	Awarded the Bronze Star Medal, Purple Heart, and Prisoner of War Medal.
Jessica Lynch	Private first class	19	Palestine, West Virginia	Awarded the Bronze Star Medal, Purple Heart, and Prisoner of War Medal.
Patrick Miller	Private first class	23	Wichita, Kansas	Awarded the Silver Star, Purple Heart, and Prisoner of War Medal.
James Riley	Sergeant	31	Pennsauken, New Jersey	Awarded the Bronze Star Medal, Purple Heart, and Prisoner of War Medal.

===== Wounded in action =====
The following soldiers of the 507th Maintenance Company were wounded in action:

Name	Rank	Hometown	Notes
Curtis Campbell	Sergeant	Brooklyn, New York	Awarded the Bronze Star Medal and the Purple Heart.
Francis Carista	Corporal		Awarded the Purple Heart.
James Grubb	Specialist	Manchester, Kentucky	Awarded the Bronze Star Medal and the Purple Heart.
Tarik Jackson	Staff sergeant	Miami, Florida	Awarded the Bronze Star Medal and the Purple Heart.
Damien Luten	Corporal		Awarded the Purple Heart.

===== Escaped capture =====
The following soldiers of the 507th Maintenance Company were noted to have escaped capture by media accounts:

Name	Rank	Hometown	Notes
Adam Elliott	Private first class		Awarded the Bronze Star Medal.
Troy Kent King	Captain		Company Commander of the 507th Maintenance Company.
Dale Nace III	Private first class		Awarded the Bronze Star Medal. Captain King's driver.
Mark Nash	Chief warrant officer		Awarded the Silver Star.
Nicholas Peterson	Specialist	Dallas, Texas	Awarded the Bronze Star Medal.
Matthew Rose	Sergeant	Salem, Oregon	Awarded the Bronze Star Medal with "V" Device.
