= Shoshana Johnson =

Panamanian-born United States Army soldier and Iraq War prisoner of war

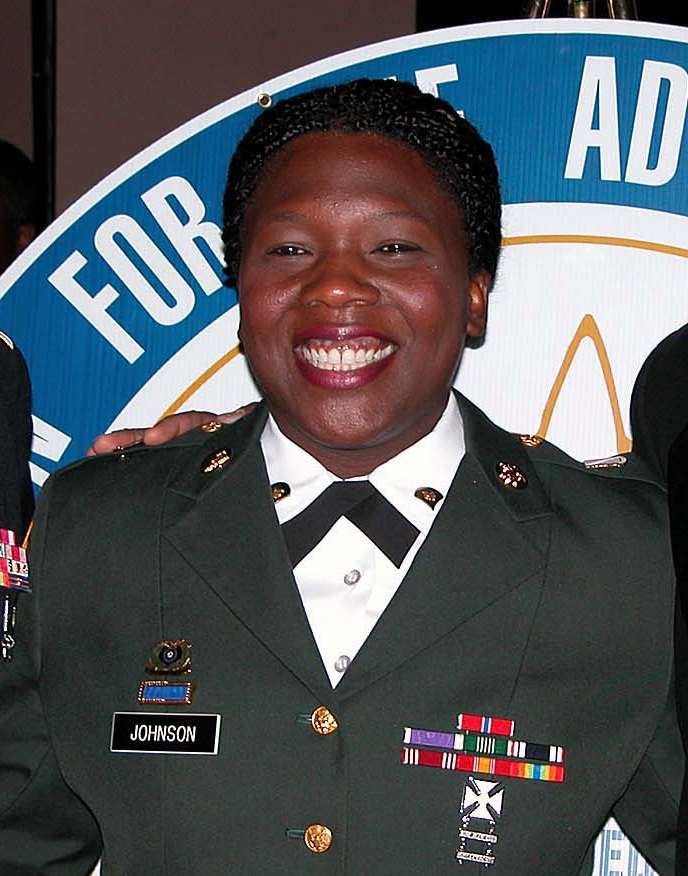
- Johnson at an NAACP dinner, July 18, 2003
- Born: Shoshana Nyree Johnson; January 18, 1973 (age 53); Pedro Miguel, Panama Canal Zone, Panama
- Alma mater: El Paso Community College
- Children: 1
- Military career
- Allegiance: United States
- Branch: United States Army
- Service years: 1998–2003
- Rank: Specialist
- Nickname: Shana
- Units: 507th Maintenance Company; 5th Battalion, 52nd Air Defense Artillery Regiment
- Conflicts: 2003 invasion of Iraq; Battle of Nasiriyah
- Awards: Bronze Star Medal; Purple Heart; Prisoner of War Medal
- Other work: Author, veterans advocate

Shoshana "Shana" Nyree Johnson (born January 18, 1973) is a Panamanian-born former United States Army soldier who became the first African-American woman taken prisoner of war in the military history of the United States.

Johnson enlisted in the Army in 1998 and served as a Food Service Specialist with the 507th Maintenance Company based at Fort Bliss, Texas.

During the opening phase of the 2003 invasion of Iraq, Johnson was wounded when her convoy was ambushed in the Battle of Nasiriyah on March 23, 2003. She was captured by Iraqi forces and held as a prisoner of war for 22 days before being rescued by U.S. Marines on April 13, 2003.

== Early life and education ==
Johnson was born on January 18, 1973, in Pedro Miguel, Panama, where her father, Sergeant First Class Claude Johnson, was serving in the United States Army. She is the eldest child of Claude Johnson and his wife, Eunice Johnson. Her family later moved to the United States and settled in El Paso, Texas, where she grew up in a military family environment connected to nearby Fort Bliss.

She attended Andress High School in El Paso, Texas, where she participated in the Junior Reserve Officers' Training Corps (JROTC). Growing up in a military household influenced her familiarity with Army life, although she did not initially intend to pursue a military career.

Johnson developed an interest in culinary arts during high school and hoped to attend culinary school. After graduating, she briefly attended the University of Texas at El Paso but later left college. Seeking work experience and a way to help finance culinary training, she enlisted in the United States Army in 1998.

== Military service ==
Johnson enlisted in the United States Army in 1998 at the age of 25 and trained as a Food Service Specialist (Military Occupational Specialty 92G). She joined the Army in part to gain culinary experience and to help pay for culinary school.

She was assigned to the 507th Maintenance Company, a logistics and support unit based at Fort Bliss, Texas. Although Johnson’s personal duty was preparing meals for soldiers, the company’s primary mission was to provide maintenance support for Army vehicles and equipment.

In February 2003, Johnson deployed to Kuwait with the 507th Maintenance Company as part of the buildup for Operation Iraqi Freedom. The unit later joined a large U.S. Army logistics convoy moving north from Kuwait into Iraq during the opening phase of the 2003 invasion.

== Capture at Nasiriyah ==
The ambush of the 507th Maintenance Company occurred during the Battle of Nasiriyah, one of the earliest major engagements of the 2003 invasion of Iraq. The city was a key strategic crossing point over the Euphrates River and saw intense fighting between coalition forces and Iraqi military units as U.S. forces advanced toward Baghdad.

On March 23, 2003, Johnson was traveling with the 507th Maintenance Company as part of a U.S. Army logistics convoy supporting operations during the early stages of the invasion. The convoy consisted of 33 soldiers in 18 vehicles moving north through southern Iraq when it became separated from the main column after a navigation error and mistakenly entered the city of Nasiriyah.

Shortly after dawn, Iraqi military and paramilitary forces ambushed the convoy. The unit came under heavy fire from small arms, rocket-propelled grenades, and other weapons as it attempted to move through the city. During the fighting, 11 soldiers from the 507th Maintenance Company were killed and several others were wounded. Among the dead was Lori Piestewa, who became the first Native American woman killed in combat while serving in the U.S. military.

Johnson was wounded during the attack, receiving gunshot wounds to both legs. After several vehicles in the convoy were disabled and the unit was unable to regroup or return effective fire, multiple soldiers were captured by Iraqi forces. Johnson was among the soldiers captured by Iraqi forces during the ambush.

Following their capture, Johnson and the other prisoners were beaten and transported toward Baghdad. Iraqi authorities filmed the captured soldiers shortly afterward and broadcast the footage internationally on Iraqi state television. The video, which showed Johnson being questioned while wounded, was widely rebroadcast by international media outlets and became one of the most widely recognized images from the early days of the war.

Johnson's capture made her the first African-American woman known to have been taken prisoner of war in the military history of the United States.

== Captivity and rescue ==
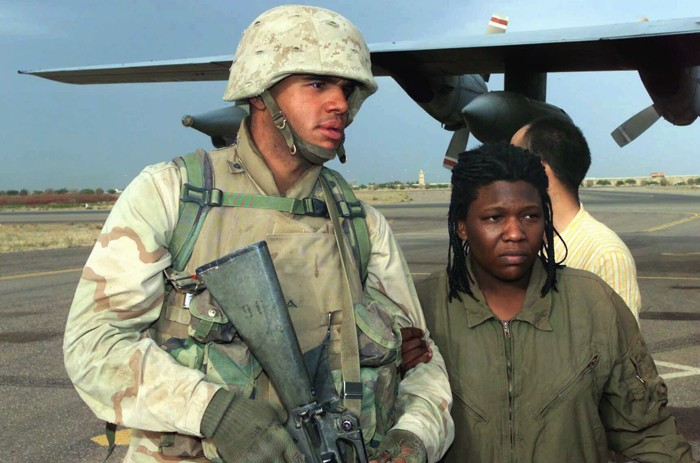
Johnson returning to Kuwait City following her rescue from Iraqi captivity, April 2003.

After their capture near Nasiriyah on March 23, 2003, Johnson and several other members of the 507th Maintenance Company were transported north toward Baghdad by Iraqi forces. During the initial capture, the wounded prisoners were beaten, but they were later treated by Iraqi medical personnel after reaching detention facilities.

During their captivity, Iraqi authorities recorded video of the captured soldiers, including Johnson, and broadcast the footage internationally on Iraqi state television. The footage, which showed Johnson wounded and being questioned by her captors, was widely rebroadcast by international media outlets.

Johnson was moved between several locations while in Iraqi custody, including detention facilities in Baghdad and other temporary sites as Iraqi forces relocated prisoners during the advancing coalition offensive.

On April 13, 2003, U.S. Marines from Company D, 3rd Light Armored Reconnaissance Battalion, 1st Marine Division, located the building where the prisoners were being held in Samarra. According to U.S. military accounts, local Iraqi residents informed Marines that American prisoners were being held at the location. Marines secured the building and recovered seven American prisoners, including Johnson and two U.S. Army helicopter pilots who had been shot down earlier in the conflict.

Johnson and the other rescued prisoners were transported to coalition medical facilities in Kuwait for treatment. Johnson underwent surgery for injuries sustained during the ambush and captivity.

In total, she had been held captive for 22 days before being freed by coalition forces.

== Aftermath and later life ==
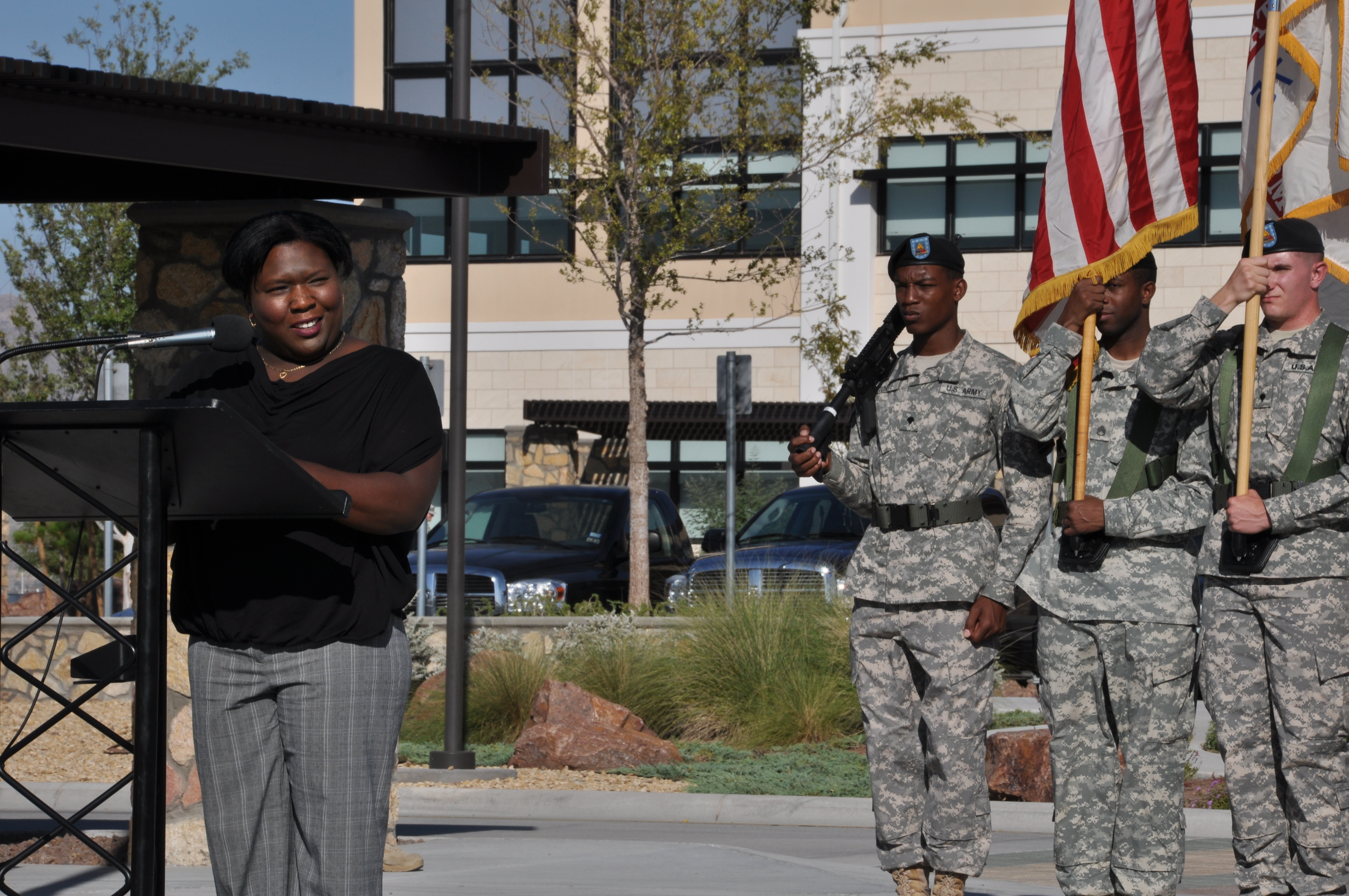
Johnson speaking at POW/MIA Recognition Day at Fort Bliss, Texas, September 21, 2012.

After her rescue on April 13, 2003, Johnson was transported to Kuwait where she received medical treatment for injuries sustained during the ambush at Nasiriyah, including gunshot wounds to both legs. She later returned to the United States and continued recovery and rehabilitation for injuries related to her captivity.

Because of lasting physical injuries from the attack and captivity, Johnson was honorably discharged from the United States Army on December 12, 2003, on a temporary disability discharge.

Johnson later resumed her education and in 2011 earned a degree in culinary arts from El Paso Community College. She subsequently became involved in veterans’ advocacy and community organizations, speaking publicly about the experiences of prisoners of war and the challenges of recovery after combat.

Johnson also wrote about her wartime experiences in the memoir I'm Still Standing: From Captive U.S. Soldier to Free Citizen—My Journey Home, published in 2010.

== Honors and recognition ==
Johnson became the first female U.S. prisoner of war of the Iraq War and the first African-American woman taken prisoner of war in the military history of the United States. Her capture during the Battle of Nasiriyah and subsequent rescue received widespread international attention during the early stages of the conflict.

On December 31, 2003, Johnson was invited by New York City mayor Michael Bloomberg to participate in activating the Times Square Ball during the city’s New Year's Eve celebration marking the beginning of 2004.

Johnson has since been recognized by veterans organizations and community groups for her military service and resilience following captivity, and she has spoken publicly about the experiences of prisoners of war and the challenges of recovery after combat.

== Awards and decorations ==
Johnson received several U.S. military decorations for her service during the Iraq War. Her unit, the 507th Maintenance Company, was awarded the Presidential Unit Citation for its actions during the Battle of Nasiriyah in 2003.

	Bronze Star Medal	
Purple Heart	Army Commendation Medal	Prisoner of War Medal
Army Good Conduct Medal	National Defense Service Medal	Army Service Ribbon
Presidential Unit Citation

== Works ==
- Johnson, Shoshana; Doyle, M. L. (2010). I'm Still Standing: From Captive U.S. Soldier to Free Citizen—My Journey Home. New York: Simon & Schuster.
