= Prisoner of War Medal =

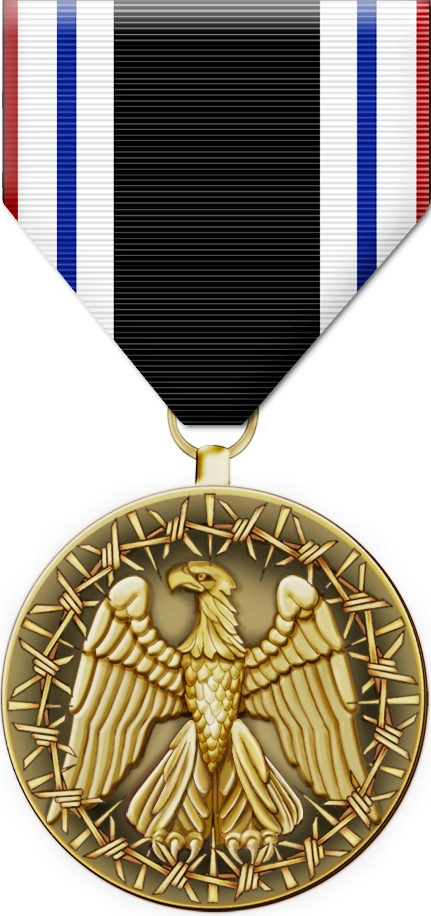
- Type: Medal
- Awarded for: Being taken prisoner and held captive while engaged in an action against an enemy of the United States; while engaged in military operations involving conflict against an opposing foreign force; while serving with friendly forces engaged in an armed conflict against an opposing armed force to which the United States is not a belligerent; or under circumstances not covered by [the 1985 statute] but which the Secretary concerned finds were comparable to those circumstances under which persons have generally been held captive by enemy armed forces during periods of armed conflict.
- Presented by: the Department of Defense
- Eligibility: Personnel serving in any capacity with the U.S. Armed Forces
- Reverse
- Status: Active
- Established: Pub.L. 99–145, 99 Stat. 665, 10 USC 1028, enacted November 8, 1985, amended by Pub.L. 101–189, enacted November 29, 1989, amended by Pub.L. 112–239, enacted January 2, 2013.
- First award: April 5, 1917 (retroactive)
- Prisoner of War Ribbon

Precedence
- Next (higher): Army: Achievement Medals; Naval Service: Navy "E" Ribbon; Air and Space Forces: Air and Space Organizational Excellence Award; Coast Guard: Coast Guard Bicentennial Unit Commendation
- Next (lower): Army, Naval Service, and Marine Corps: Good Conduct Medal; Air and Space Forces: Combat Readiness Medal

The Prisoner of War Medal is a military award of the United States Armed Forces which was authorized by Congress and signed into law by President Ronald Reagan on 8 November 1985. The United States Code citation for the POW Medal statute is 10 U.S.C. § 1128.

The Prisoner of War Medal may be awarded to any person who was a prisoner of war after April 5, 1917 (the date of the United States' entry into World War I was April 6). It is awarded to any person who was taken prisoner or held captive while engaged in an action against an enemy of the United States; while engaged in military operations involving conflict with an opposing Armed Force; or while serving with friendly forces engaged in armed conflict against an opposing Armed Force in which the United States is not a belligerent party. As of an amendment to Title 10 of the United States Code in 2013, the medal is also awarded for captivity under circumstances "which the Secretary concerned finds were comparable to those circumstances under which persons have generally been held captive by enemy armed forces during periods of armed conflict." The person's conduct, while in captivity, must have been honorable. This medal may be awarded posthumously to the surviving next of kin of the recipient.

No more than one Prisoner of War Medal may be awarded. For any subsequent award of the medal, service stars will be awarded and worn on the suspension and service ribbon of the medal.

The medal was designed by Jay C. Morris of the United States Army Institute of Heraldry.

== Legal ==
=== Legislative proposals for the medal ===
The idea of creating a military award to recognize prisoners of war was first put forth in 1944. However, the military services opposed the idea, claiming that other medals could be awarded in such cases. Congressman F. Edward Hébert (D-LA) submitted a bill to create a POW lapel button in 1971, but the bill was defeated. The Defense Department told Hébert that the pin "could have an adverse impact on the morale and pride of those families whose members are or were missing in action," and also claimed that it was inappropriate to seem to reward soldiers for having suffered with "such an undesirable status" as prisoners of war.

The first Senate bill to create a POW Medal was submitted by Senator John G. Tower (R-TX) in the same year, but his bill was also defeated due to opposition by the military services. Congressman G. William Whitehurst (R-VA) proposed the medal again in 1975, and was informed by the Department of Defense that "the present hierarchy of military awards is adequate for recognizing valorous and meritorious acts" performed by former POWs. The Iran hostage crisis in 1979 changed the attitudes of many Americans toward POWs, and helped convince Congress to authorize a POW Medal.

In April 1981, only months after the Iran hostages were released, Congressman Robert Badham (R-CA) introduced the POW Medal yet again. This bill was also defeated. Senator Alan K. Simpson (R-WY) asked the Department of Defense to create a "Prisoner of War Recognition Medal" in 1983, and the Department of the Army informed him that awards were only intended as "an incentive to achieve some higher goal or perform some desired service" and maintained that surrendering did not accomplish any such goal. Only in 1985 did Congress pass legislation creating the POW Medal, notably over the Pentagon's objections.

=== Original legislation ===
The statute that established the POW Medal was Public Law 99–145, Title V, Sec. 532(a)(1), Nov. 8, 1985. The public law in question, which began as S.1160, was the National Defense Authorization Act for Fiscal Year 1986, sponsored by Senator Barry Goldwater of Arizona. It was first amended on May 21, 1985, by Senator William V. Roth, Jr. to include the language that first established eligibility criteria for the POW Medal in Title 10, § 1128.

According to Roth, "This amendment will formally recognize that character of military service which arises under the most hostile and difficult of circumstances -- that of being held prisoner by the enemy." The House version of this amendment was submitted on June 21, by Congressman Robert J. Lagomarsino. According to Lagomarsino, "Official recognition of American prisoners of war is long overdue, Mr. Chairman. This medal will honor the more than 142,000 prisoners of war, and their families, who have sacrificed their liberty for the freedom of this country during World War I, World War II, and the Korean and Vietnam wars."

==== Scope of legislation ====
The original wording contained in Public Law 99-145 only authorized the POW Medal for service members held captive "while engaged in an action against an enemy of the United States; while engaged in military operations involving conflict with an opposing foreign force; or while serving with friendly forces engaged in an armed conflict against an opposing armed force in which the United States is not a belligerent party."

Accordingly, DoD policy articulated in 1988 concluded that only military captives taken prisoner by enemy or opposing states during active armed conflict were eligible for the award. Specifically, DoD policy stated that "hostages of terrorists and persons detained by governments with which the US is not actively engaged in armed conflict are not eligible for the medal."

The armed conflict requirements in 10 USC 1128(a)(1-3) were drawn verbatim from a 1963 Act of Congress that added the same criteria to most valor awards, which is why the original POW Medal shares the same combat prerequisites with the Medal of Honor, Distinguished Service Cross, Silver Star, and other valor awards. In 1963 Congress drew these three permutations of combat from President Kennedy's executive order of April 25, 1962, which added the same criteria to the Purple Heart. Kennedy had also added similar criteria for the Bronze Star prior to the 1963 act.

The 1963 law was necessary because Cold War armed conflicts did not qualify for consideration under previous statutes such as the 1918 Act of Congress that required valor "in action involving actual conflict with an enemy" for awards such as the Medal of Honor and Distinguished Service Cross. Requiring conflict with an enemy was problematic since the United States had not formally declared war since World War II as a result of the provisions of the United Nations Charter. According to congressional testimony by the Army's deputy chief of staff for personnel, the services were seeking authority to award the Medal of Honor and other valor awards retroactive to July 1, 1958, in areas such as Berlin, Lebanon, Quemoy and Matsu Islands, Taiwan Straits, Congo, Laos, Vietnam, and Cuba. These were all areas where the DoD authorized the Armed Forces Expeditionary Medal.

==== Challenges to legislation ====
A congressional inquiry on behalf of the former crew of USS Pueblo, who were detained in North Korea in 1968, resulted in a 1988 DoD General Counsel opinion authored by Kathleen A. Buck. The general counsel argued that the Pueblo's "passive type of activity hardly qualifies ... as an 'action', a term that denotes violence in the employment of weapons." Therefore, Buck concluded that the Pueblo crew was not involved in active armed conflict and fell outside the statute, a position that was hotly contested by the crew and even by the congressmen who authored the legislation. Commander Lloyd M. Bucher, the former commanding officer of the Pueblo, responded to the review and petitioned directly to the Chief of Naval Operations, Admiral Carlisle Trost. Bucher claimed that the DoD's position on the medal was "simply contrary to the facts," noting that the Pueblo crew received the Navy's Combat Action Ribbon "specifically for surface combat with North Korea on 23 January 1968."

Bucher's petition eventually resulted in the Navy's supporting an amendment to the POW Medal statute to allow eligibility for service members taken captive during situations other than armed conflict. Congressman Robert Lagomarsino, author of the original POW Medal legislation, also agreed with Bucher. He said in an affidavit that the Pueblo crew were denied the medal due to a "technicality," and claimed that "it was never my intent to preclude the crew members of the USS Pueblo from eligibility for this medal."

Others, including the military hostages held during the U.S. Embassy hostage crisis in Tehran, Iran from 1979 to 1981, likewise objected to their ineligibility. Responding to May 1989 congressional inquiry on behalf of the Iran hostages, Deputy Assistant Secretary of Defense David J. Berteau, a career civilian who had never served in the U.S. armed forces, noted that, "...many Service members have been held as hostages, detainees or internees who do not meet the criteria for award of the POW Medal."

Berteau explained that the criteria for the medal applied only in "wartime situations," and argued that, "...once the criteria is divorced from wartime situations, it will be difficult to establish a basis for the award in the many other circumstances which could occur." In addition, Berteau argued with regard to granting the medal to people captured outside formal armed conflict, i.e., being detained by those who are not officially enemies of the United States. "If the criteria were changed to recognize all members held as prisoners, hostages, detainees and internees," he said, " the recognition originally intended for actual prisoners of war will be lost."

=== 1989 expansion ===
10 U.S.C. § 1128 was later modified by Pub. L. 101–189, Nov. 29, 1989, which originated from H.R.2461, the National Defense Authorization Act for Fiscal Year 1990 and 1991. Sponsored by Representative Les Aspin, the bill added the fourth paragraph to Title 10 § 1128 and authorized the POW Medal for those captured "by foreign armed forces that are hostile to the United States, under circumstances which the Secretary concerned finds to have been comparable to those under which persons have generally been held captive by enemy armed forces during periods of armed conflict."

This amendment was the result of congressional recognition of multiple groups of individuals who were not originally authorized to receive the medal after Department of Defense review, such as the USS Pueblo crew detained in North Korea in 1968, the U.S. Navy and U.S. Army Air Forces flight crews interned in the neutral USSR during World War II, the U.S. Army Air Forces crews interned in neutral Switzerland during World War II, U.S. Marine Corps Colonel William R. Higgins who was kidnapped in 1988 and executed by Hezbollah-affiliated terrorists, and the U.S. Marines from the U.S. Embassy in Teheran, Iran who were held hostage by terrorists from 1979 to 1981 in the Iran Hostage Crisis. The 1989 amendment is no longer in the statute; it was later removed by the 2013 amendment, due to policy mistakes that effectively precluded its implementation.

==== Intent of 1989 amendment ====
As expressed by the House Committee on Armed Services in report 101–121, the original intent of the POW Medal statute was to allow the award in incidents such as the USS Pueblo capture, but that due to the wording of the statute the detainees simply did not "meet the literal requirements of the law." Admiral J.M. Boorda, the (then) Deputy Chief of Naval Operations, made a policy statement to the House Committee on Armed Services on behalf of OSD and OMB: "Within the Department of Defense, the general counsel has determined that the Pueblo crew does not, under the current statute, qualify for the POW medal…Additionally, persons detained by governments with which the United States is not engaged actively in armed conflict are not eligible for the POW medal. As a result, if an award is to be made, and I believe it should be, it is necessary to amend the existing statute that is currently being processed through the Department." Rep. Jim Slattery, who drafted the House version of the 1989 amendment to 10 USC § 1128, explained to the House Committee on Armed Services that the amendment was intended to remedy "a quirk in the law" that required active armed conflict against an enemy state.

As a result, detainees of non-enemies such as the crew of the USS Pueblo were not eligible for consideration for the award, since "the United States was not in open conflict with North Korea at the time the USS Pueblo was attacked." According to Senator Alan Cranston, who drafted the Senate version of the 1989 amendment to 10 USC § 1128, "The Department of Defense has interpreted that provision [Public Law 99-145], which is codified at section 1128 of title 10, as not permitting the award of [the POW Medal] to individuals who were taken and held as prisoner in situations other than the classical prisoner-of-war situation during armed conflict. As a result, the medal has not been awarded to such former captives as the crewmembers of the USS Pueblo and the military personnel who were held captive in Iran during the seizure of the United States Embassy in Teheran." Cranston stated explicitly that the amendment was intended to "include [as] eligible for the medal those individuals who were held captive in neutral or allied countries in situations similar to those of prisoner-of-war conditions during armed conflict."

==== Scope of final amendment ====
The Senate members of the conference committee for the FY1990 National Defense Authorization Act eventually drafted an amendment that "would clarify the intent of Congress that persons serving with the U.S. armed forces who are taken prisoner and held captive by certain hostile, foreign armed forces should receive the prisoner of war medal. This clarification is intended to cover the individuals taken prisoner as a result of the USS Pueblo seizure, as well as any similar occurrence that the Service Secretary concerned deems comparable to the circumstances under which persons have generally been held captive by enemy armed forces during a war or conflict." This amendment to the POW Medal statute appeared at 10 USC § 1128 (a)(4) prior to its repeal in 2013.

The exception clause added by the 1989 amendment was the only authority to award the POW Medal to persons held outside formal armed conflict, including non-state actors such as terrorist, since terrorists are not conventional enemy armed forces that would automatically qualify a captive for the award under the original statute adopted by the 99th Congress in 1985. Detainees and internees of neutral countries were also authorized the award provided that the service secretary determined that circumstances of their captivity were "comparable to those under which persons have generally been held captive by enemy armed forces during periods of armed conflict." What exactly qualified as comparable circumstances of captivity and treatment was never defined in Title 10, although the 38 USC § 101 (32) Veterans Affairs POW Status statute that served as the source of the 'comparability clause' for the 1989 amendment to Title 10 contains similar language requiring "circumstances which the Secretary finds to have been comparable to the circumstances under which persons have generally been forcibly detained or interned by enemy governments during periods of war."

According to VA guidelines contained in 38 C.F.R. § 3.1 (y): "To be considered a former prisoner of war, a serviceperson must have been forcibly detained or interned under circumstances comparable to those under which persons generally have been forcibly detained or interned by enemy governments during periods of war. Such circumstances include, but are not limited to, physical hardships or abuse, psychological hardships or abuse, malnutrition, and unsanitary conditions." Although these criteria do not formally apply to the military's Title 10 POW statute, the legal rule of in pari materia allows the reference of the Title 38 guidelines for clarification purposes since both statutes were crafted to be complementary. Therefore, the military previously referenced VA determinations of POW status for veterans affairs purposes- including VA comparability criteria- in order to establish eligibility for the POW Medal.

==== Awards under the 1989 amendment (no longer current law) ====
===== Detainees =====
This category applied to servicemembers detained by a foreign government in the absence of a formal armed conflict. After the passage of Public Law 101–189, Secretary of the Navy H. Lawrence Garrett III authorized the POW Medal to the crew of the USS Pueblo on December 22, 1989, and the medal was awarded to the crew on May 5, 1990. Later in 1991, Secretary Garrett also awarded the POW Medal to a Naval Flight Officer, LT Robert O. "Bobby" Goodman, Jr., USN, whose A-6E Intruder attack jet was shot down by Syrian anti-aircraft gunners while conducting an airstrike against Syrian positions in Hammana, east of Beirut, on December 4, 1983.

His pilot having been killed during the shootdown, Goodman was captured by Syrian forces and imprisoned until January 5, 1984, when he was released. In a 1991 Navy Office of the Judge Advocate General (OTJAG) review of Goodman's case, a Navy attorney stated that individuals held outside armed conflict, "...may be entitled to POW medals as a result of the [1989] amendment if the Secretary determines that the circumstances under which they were held captive were 'comparable to those under which persons have generally been held captive by enemy armed forces during periods of armed conflict.'" In 1993 the Secretary of the Army awarded the POW Medal to CW3 Michael Durant, an Army MH-60 Blackhawk helicopter special operations pilot who was shot down in Mogadishu and held captive by warlord Mohamed Aidid. In 1996, retired USAF officers Colonel Freeman "Bruce" Olmstead and Colonel John McKone received the POW Medal from the Secretary of the Air Force for their captivity in Lubyanka prison in Moscow, Russia, between July 1960 and January 1961; the two were shot down by a Russian fighter plane while flying their RB-47 Stratojet on a patrol over the Barents Sea. According to the USAF deputy chief of staff for personnel, "...a precedent has been set with the award of POW Medals to the crew of the USS Pueblo and to Chief Warrant Officer Michael Durant for his capture in Somalia." In 2000, U-2 pilot Gary Powers posthumously received the POW Medal from the USAF for his captivity in Russia.

The deputy general counsel for National Security and Military Affairs staffed the award for Powers, and explained that Powers qualified despite being held outside active armed conflict. According to the general counsel, "The phrase that the Secretary must find the circumstances of captivity to be comparable to those under which persons have generally been held captive by enemy armed forces during periods of armed conflict does not mean that the event must occur during an armed conflict such as World Wars I & II, the Korean War, Vietnam War, etc. It means that the circumstances must be comparable." In particular, the general counsel highlighted the importance of connecting the captivity to some kind of military or national-security objective, which would separate a case like Powers' from that of a person who "carelessly wanders across the border of a country hostile to the U.S. and is seized by military border guards and imprisoned."

===== Internees =====
This category applied to any belligerent servicemembers interned by non-belligerent (or neutral) countries during a period of international armed conflict. According to the legislative history of the 1989 amendment to the POW Medal statute, internees were intended beneficiaries of the POW Medal so long as they were treated comparably to POWs during periods of armed conflict. However, only a few select groups of internees received the POW Medal under the 1989 amendment due to DoD and service policy that failed to incorporate the 1989 amendment, and differing interpretations of the ambiguous statutory language requiring captivity by "foreign armed forces hostile to the U.S." as well as the requirement for "comparable" circumstances of treatment. From 1991 to 1993 the Air Force and the Navy Secretaries awarded the POW Medal to all U.S. aircrew members interned in neutral Russia during World War II, a total of 291 personnel. While staffing one of the Navy awards, the Assistant Vice Chief of Naval Operations, Rear Admiral Raymond M. Walsh, explained that an internee of the Soviet Union was previously denied the POW Medal under the older version of 10 USC § 1128 "because he was not a prisoner of an enemy of the United States." However, he could now be considered for the medal because "The 1989 change to the law permits the Secretary of the Navy to determine if the circumstances under which [an internee] was held captive were ‘comparable to those under which persons have generally been held captive by enemy armed forces during periods of armed conflict.’"

While staffing the Air Force award, the Air Force Directorate of Personnel Services (AFPC/DPS) concluded that "In 1989, Title 10, Section 1128, regarding Prisoner of War Medals changed and allowed Service secretaries to determine eligibility for the POW Medal for personnel held captive in countries not directly involved in armed conflict with the United States, provided the treatment of the prisoners was similar to the treatment received by prisoners held by enemy forces." AFPC/DPS determined that the internees in Siberia met the statutory criteria because "the conditions of this detainment were comparable, if not worse, than those experienced in Germany, and therefore, should be eligible for the POW Medal." In 1996 and 2006 the USAF awarded POW Medals to USAAF T/Sgt Daniel Culler and Lt. Richard Pettit for illegal incarceration during World War II in prison camp Wauwilermoos, in neutral Switzerland. Both airmen were confined at Wauwilermoos as a punishment for escape attempts.

By November 1944, over 100 U.S. airmen were confined in Wauwilermoos, and were only released after the U.S. Legation in Switzerland presented a protest authorized by the acting U.S. Secretary of State, which accused the Swiss Army of violating provisions of the 1929 Geneva Convention relative to the treatment of prisoners of war. The U.S. Minister in Bern, Leland Harrison, informed the Swiss Political Department Minister that he was "surprised that [the Swiss] have a more severe attitude toward [escaping internees] than if they were prisoners of war." The rejection of the POW Medal to many internees mistreated in Switzerland led Congress to further modify the 1989 amendment in 2013, such that this language could no longer be used to block the award for internees or any other type of captive held outside active armed conflict.

===== Hostages of terrorists =====
This category applied to servicemembers held captive or hostage by non-state actors regardless of the existence of an active armed conflict. The first hostage award under the amended statute was possibly the case of Donald R. Blair, a sailor based in Okinawa in 1946 who was sent to Tsingtao, China, to train Nationalist Chinese forces. Blair was captured by communist forces, tortured, and was released after 44 days when he was exchanged for two communist officers. He later received the POW Medal from the Secretary of the Navy around 1991. According to the Marine Corps Deputy Commandant for Manpower and Reserve Affairs, Mr. Blair was "a member of the US Navy [who] was interned from 3 December 1946 to 15 January 1947 by Chinese guerilla forces."

This case was then used as a precedent for several other hostage scenarios outside formal armed conflict. In 2001 Secretary of the Navy Richard Danzig awarded the POW Medal to the thirteen USMC embassy guards held hostage in the U.S. Embassy in Iran during the Iran Hostage Crisis. According to the Navy's Deputy Assistant Judge Advocate General for Administrative Law, the Marines held in Tehran were "entitled to award of the medal if the Secretary determines that circumstances under which they were held captive were 'comparable to those under which persons have generally been held captive by enemy armed forces during periods of armed conflict.'" Similarly, in 2003 USAF Secretary James G. Roche authorized the POW Medal to all "U.S. Air Force personnel taken hostage anytime during the period of 4 November 1979 to 22 January 1981, at the U.S. Embassy in Tehran, Iran." According to Roche, the USAF hostages qualified because "[they] were held by a foreign armed force hostile to the United States and were under circumstances comparable to prisoners held by enemy forces during periods of armed conflict," a clear reference to the 1989 amendment. The qualification of the USAF hostages was reviewed by Richard Peterson of the Air Force Office of the Judge Advocate General.

Peterson referenced the legislative intent, noting that "the military members held captive in Iran when the US Embassy was seized were mentioned by Senator Cranston when he introduced the Senate bill." He concluded that hostages of terrorists qualified for the medal because "Americans captured there were clearly held captive (vice merely being under house arrest, for example)," and "the law does not require that the captors be members of the military of a recognized state, but only that they be organized as an armed force hostile to the US." In Peterson's opinion, the Iranian captors were "members of an armed force hostile to the US" in spite of not being "regularly constituted Iranian Army forces." Despite this legal endorsement and the AF Secretary approval, the USAF did not award the medal to any Iran hostages until November 2011.

The U.S. Army also staffed an awards package for most of their hostages in 2003, explaining that "in view of the expanded criteria for award of the POW Medal [contained in the 1989 amendment], the Soldiers held in Iran are eligible for award of the medal." All Army soldiers were approved with the exception of Staff Sergeant Joseph Subic Jr., who was denied because "his character of service was determined not to be consistent with POW Medal policy." However, as with the USAF, the Army did not award any of the medals even after they were approved and the soldiers were located. In 2006 and 2009 the Secretary of the Army retroactively awarded the medal to two of the former hostages, Donald Hohman and Regis Ragan, who were previously approved but had to appeal to the Army's Board for Correction of Military Records to obtain the awards. In November 2011, the Army awarded the medal to most of the remaining Army hostages, including Colonel Charles Scott, Colonel Leland Holland, and Chief Warrant Officer Joseph Hall, with the explanation that "due to administrative oversight and staff transition, there has been some delay in you receiving this award."

In 2003, the Secretary of the Navy awarded the POW Medal (posthumously) to USMC Colonel William R. Higgins, who was kidnapped in 1988 and executed by Hezbollah-affiliated terrorists. According to the head of the Marine Corps Awards Branch, "The law governing the Prisoner of War (POW) Medal was amended in 1989. The late Colonel Higgins is eligible for the POW Medal based upon this change to [the] legislation." In a supporting recommendation, the office of the Marine Corps Deputy Commandant for Manpower and Reserve Affairs stated that COL Higgins was "kidnapped in 1988 by Islamic terrorists," and therefore met the criteria of captivity "by foreign armed forces that are hostile to the United States." According to the Deputy Commandant's recommendation, "The posthumous awarding of the POW Medal to Colonel Higgins is consistent with law and precedent, and should be supported."

Several other hostages of terrorists also received the POW Medal after abduction by terrorists or insurgents during operations in Iraq subsequent to the collapse of the Hussein regime in 2003. Several of these U.S. Army hostages of terrorists who received the POW Medal include Private First Class Kristian Menchaca and Private First Class Thomas Lowell Tucker, who were abducted from a roadside checkpoint on June 16, 2006, and later executed by Al-Qaeda in Iraq. Several other U.S. Army soldiers received the POW Medal after the 20 January 2007 Karbala provincial headquarters raid including 1LT Jacob Fritz, SPC John Chism, and PFC Shawn Falter. These soldiers were also killed during captivity.

==== Issues of policy and interpretation of 1989 amendment ====
===== Armed conflict requirement =====
Interim DoD policy articulated in 1988 concluded that only military captives taken prisoner by enemy states during active armed conflict were eligible for the award. Specifically, DoD policy stated that "the medal will be issued only to those taken prisoner by an enemy during armed conflict," and further states that "hostages of terrorists and persons detained by governments with which the US is not actively engaged in armed conflict are not eligible for the medal." However, the 1989 amendment to the POW Medal Statute that created an exception to the armed conflict requirement was overlooked in the July 1990 version of the DoD Manual of Military Decorations and Awards, presumably because the 1989 amendment occurred in November, during the staffing window for the 1990 revision to the manual. Instead of incorporating the 1989 amendment, the 1990 manual incorrectly repeated the 1988 policy almost verbatim, such that it required that "the POW Medal shall be issued only to those taken prisoner by an enemy during armed conflict," and "hostages of terrorists and persons detained by governments with which the United States is not engaged actively in armed conflict are not eligible for the medal." No mention was made of the 1989 amendment at all. Change 1 of the 1990 DoD manual, issued in June 1991, also lacked any reference to the 1989 amendment.

The error in policy was finally discovered at the Office of the Secretary of Defense in March 1991, when a Navy OTJAG attorney conducted a legal review on two cases where Navy personnel were detained in China and Syria, both outside formal armed conflict. The attorney discovered that neither the DoD awards manual nor the Navy's awards manual cited the 1989 amendment, and he called the Assistant Secretary of Defense for Force Management and Personnel (ASD/FM&P). The action officer at ASD/FM&P reportedly "acknowledged that the Service Secretaries do have this authority [to overrule the policy and invoke the 1989 amendment]." The OTJAG attorney concluded his report by recommending that "it may be advisable to examine the possibility of further defining qualifying criteria in the SECNAV Awards Manual in line with the statutory guidance for the purpose of simplifying future decisionmaking regarding the POW Medal," but this step was not taken. The June 1993 version of the DoD awards manual finally incorporated the 1989 amendment with the addition of the exception that "the POW Medal shall be issued only to those taken prisoner by foreign armed forces that are hostile to the United States, under circumstances which the Secretary concerned finds to have been comparable to those under which persons have generally been held captive by enemy forces during periods of armed conflict." In addition, the requirement for active armed conflict was removed, and the prohibition for detainees and hostages held outside armed conflict was also removed. However, no language was added to explain what the new language meant or how to implement it, particularly that the law was modified to provide an exception to captivity in active armed conflict. The legal citation for the POW Medal also remained unchanged, and did not reference the 1989 amendment.

As a result, none of the services correctly incorporated the change in policy in their manuals. The Army did not change its medal policy until 2006, when it added the 1989 amendment but incorrectly retained the contradictory requirement that "hostages of terrorists and persons detained by governments with which the United States is not engaged actively in armed conflict are not eligible for the medal." The Navy still retains the original requirements from the 1990 version of DoD policy, and thus has never removed the armed conflict requirement nor added any mention of the 1989 amendment. The Air Force awards publication defers to the DoD awards manual on the subject of the POW Medal. Other service-level legal reviews highlighted the problems still evident in service-level policy. The 2001 Navy OTJAG legal review for the USMC hostages held in Iran from 1979 to 1981 noted that the previous version of the DoD awards manual incorrectly "limited issuance of the award to periods of active armed conflict."

The attorney noted that the POW Medal statute "had recently expanded eligibility for the POW Medal to members held captive by foreign armed forces when the United States was not involved in armed conflict," and cited that "the inconsistency no longer exists" in the DoD manual. However, he noted that "the Navy and Marine Corps Awards Manual, issued in 1991, has not been updated to reflect the change in the statute." Thus, the requirement for active armed conflict remained in the Army and Navy awards manuals. During a 2010 policy review, the Office of the Secretary of Defense erroneously added the armed conflict requirement back into the DoD awards manual. As a result, DoD policy from 2010 to 2013 incorrectly stated that "hostages of terrorists and persons detained by governments with which the United States is not engaged actively in armed conflict are not eligible for the medal." This language directly contradicted the 1989 amendment.

===== Captivity by hostile foreign armed forces requirement =====
This requirement was never clearly defined in the law or the policy at any level, and for many years was completely omitted from service policy due to mistakes by responsible officials. The requirement for hostile forces was subjectively interpreted any number of ways. According to official DoD doctrine in a separate publication issued years after the creation of the POW Medal, a "hostile act" is defined as "An attack or other use of force against the US, US forces, or other designated persons or property. It also includes force used directly to preclude or impede the mission and/or duties of US forces, including the recovery of US personnel or vital US Government property." A "hostile force" is defined as "Any civilian, paramilitary, or military force or terrorist(s), with or without national designation, that have committed a hostile act, exhibited hostile intent, or have been declared hostile by appropriate US authority." "Armed forces" are defined as "The military forces of a nation or a group of nations." Although the original Senate bill that produced the 1989 amendment intended to make the treatment of captives the operative qualifying condition for those held outside formal armed conflict, this intent was only sporadically enforced. The requirement for captivity by "foreign armed forces that are hostile to the United States" was sometimes interpreted to encompass a range of captors, stretching from neutral states, hostile individuals/terrorists, to countries in a de facto state of war with the United States."

The definition of a hostile force is necessarily distinct from an enemy force or opposing force (which require a formal declaration of war or joint resolution authorizing use of military force or some other evidence of a protracted conflict, respectively), since captives of enemy and opposing armed forces fall under the automatic qualification of the original 1985 statute that the amendment modified. Thus, the 1989 amendment applied only to those held outside armed conflict, which also meant that hostility was a designation that did not require armed conflict. The USS Pueblo crew's detention in North Korea was mentioned explicitly in the conference report for the amendment, clearly indicating that North Korea qualified as a hostile foreign armed force. A conservative interpretation of the hostile force requirement sometimes resulted in denial of the medal for internees of neutral countries and hostages of terrorists, since in both cases ill-treatment during captivity is not necessarily condoned at the level of state policy. For example, Air Force attorneys argued in Board for Correction of Military Records cases that neutrality and hostility were mutually exclusive, despite the fact that incidents have occurred where captives of neutrals were severely mistreated by hostile individuals. This interpretation was at odds with international law, which only recognizes states that are belligerent and those that are not. Hostile forces distinct from enemy forces bear no mention and have no meaning under international law. Thus, hostile forces are merely a vague sub-category of non-belligerence. Furthermore, treaty law frequently commingles so-called "non-belligerents" and neutral states, making them indissociable. For example, the Third Geneva Convention of 1949 relative to the Treatment of Prisoners of War makes virtually no distinction between non-belligerents and neutrals, and imposes many of the same duties on both.

The International Committee of the Red Cross's Commentary on the Additional Protocols of 8 June 1977 to the Geneva Conventions of 12 August 1949 similarly elaborates that "other forms of non-participation in a conflict have been added to neutrality as defined by treaty and customary law," and that "it would have sufficed to use the expression ‘not engaged in the conflict’ or ‘not Party to the conflict’" in lieu of using the term ‘neutral.’ The Commentary explicitly states that the term ‘neutral’ "should be interpreted as covering non-participation in conflicts in general, as well as neutrality in the proper sense of the word." Therefore, all non-belligerence is a form of neutrality, which means that neutrality includes the entire range of states not formally participating in international armed conflict such as de facto belligerents, non-participants who do not claim neutrality, temporary declared neutrals, and even long-standing neutrals. Thus, in this type of case, the legal question is not whether neutrality negates hostility, but rather whether an individual who detains Americans and mistreats them becomes hostile at a level below the entire state in question, and whether this alone qualifies as captivity by hostile foreign armed forces if the parent government (if one exists) is not necessarily hostile.

Hostages of terrorists were sometimes denied eligibility for lack of detention by a state, normally through the citation of the outdated armed conflict requirement in DoD policy, or by claiming that terrorists are not hostile foreign armed forces. For example, several military hostages held during the Iran Hostage Crisis were initially denied the award or incorrectly sent to the Board for Correction of Military Records, which is not appropriate if the captive is eligible or already qualified. The Army incorrectly sent the case of former hostage Sergeant Major Regis Ragan to the Board for Correction in 2009, even though he was already qualified as per a 2004 by-name approval from Army Secretary Brownlee. Another example is the case of LtCol William R. Higgins, who was kidnapped and killed by Hezbollah affiliates in 1988. DoD General Counsel Judith A. Miller initially blocked the award in 1998 based on the claim that "circumstances do not appear to meet the criteria established by Congress for award of the Prisoner of War Medal," which may have been a reference to the fact that Higgins's captors were not members of regularly constituted (state) armed forces.

However, it is likely that Miller did not understand the language of the amendment or know that the statute was amended in the first place, since neither the law nor the policy explained the ambiguous language that amended the statute in 1989, and the policy failed to note that the law was ever amended. The Navy disagreed with Miller, and in 2003 it overruled her determination and awarded the POW Medal to Higgins. Since the attacks against the World Trade Center and the Pentagon in 2001 the Office of the Secretary of Defense has promoted a broader definition of "opposing armed force" that now includes individual actors or terrorists. However, there is little room for this interpretation in the original statute that standardized the same conflict prerequisites for valor awards in 1963, which expanded several decorations to armed conflicts against an "opposing foreign force" or "while serving with friendly forces engaged in an armed conflict against an opposing armed force in which the United States is not a belligerent party." In this context, both of these opposing forces were interpreted to be states in a Cold-War conflict short of a formal war, not non-state actors.

The post-9-11 conflict in Afghanistan was somewhat different from prior actions against terrorists, in that Congress passed an authorization for use of military force. The September 18, 2001 authorization for use of military force specified that "the President is authorized to use all necessary and appropriate force against those nations, organizations, or persons he determines planned, authorized, committed, or aided the terrorist attacks that occurred on September 11, 2001, or harbored such organizations or persons." Technically, this resolution only applied to those who actually perpetrated or aided perpetrators of the September 11 attacks, meaning that not all terrorists or captors of U.S. soldiers are "opposing foreign forces," and captivity not associated with the September 11 attacks should be adjudicated for POW Medal eligibility based on treatment rather than automatic qualification.

===== Comparable treatment requirement =====
Again, the statute and the policy do not define what constitutes comparable treatment. Ostensibly, the base of comparison are the general historical conditions of captivity for American prisoners who qualify automatically for the POW Medal through captivity by enemy or opposing armed forces. The origin of the "comparability clause" is the language dictating Veterans Affairs POW determinations in 38 USC § 101(32), which was created by Public Law 97-37 and later expanded in Public Law 100–322. Senator Alan Cranston, then chairman of the Veterans Affairs Committee, both expanded the VA eligibility law in 1988 and authored a companion bill to expand the POW Medal statute. This bill, S.487, was eventually incorporated into the FY1990 National Defense Authorization Act, and became part of the 1989 amendment to the POW Medal statute. Thus, there is a link between the language and intent of both statutes. The legal rule of pari materia allows the reference of companion statutes to provide context.

Accordingly, the VA regulations cite that comparable circumstances "include, but are not limited to, physical hardships or abuse, psychological hardships or abuse, malnutrition, and unsanitary conditions." A military secretary is not bound by these qualifiers for comparable treatment, but the framework is a useful reference in the absence of explicit DoD guidance on comparable circumstances. There is precedent for the use of VA rules in military POW determinations. In the case of US Navy internees held by the Soviet Union during WWII, the Navy's Office of the Judge Advocate General cited that "the Veteran's Administration has determined that [redacted internee] will qualify for benefits afforded POWs. Although we are not bound by VA rulings in this case I believe that the Prisoner of War Medal should be awarded to [redacted internee] and the other 45 people listed." The attorney referenced a VA POW approval that stated "a decision has been made that [an internee's] detention by Russian forces was under circumstances comparable to those under which persons generally have been forcibly detained or interned by enemy governments during wartime. He is therefore considered a former prisoner of war and entitled to the same benefits as if he had been held by enemy forces."

=== 2013 amendment to clarify non-conflict captivity awards ===
==== Background and intent of 2013 amendment ====
The ambiguity of the 1989 amendment as well as the various policy mistakes spawned an effort to clarify the language in 10 USC 1128(a)(4) allowing the medal for some captives held outside armed conflict. In 2010, multiple rejections of USAAF internees mistreated in Switzerland during World War II led the House Committee on Armed Services to direct the Secretary of Defense to "review the rationale for awarding the prisoner-of-war medal to some Wauwilermoos internees and not to others," and "to award the prisoner-of-war medal to those Wauwilermoos internees, who upon review, the Secretary determines to be entitled to the award." In response, the Department of Defense again denied the awards under the justification that "Switzerland was a neutral country and Switzerland's armed forces were not hostile to the United States."

The department determined that the statute's requirement for "foreign armed forces that are hostile to the United States" did not encompass members of the Swiss military because of Swiss neutrality, irrespective of the personal hostility of the Swiss service members who mistreated the U.S. airmen held at Wauwilermoos prison. In response, the House Committee on Armed Services authored an amendment contained in the FY2013 National Defense Authorization Act that proposed amending 10 USC 1128(a)(4) by striking "that are hostile to the United States." In conference, the Senate revised the amendment to state: "Under uniform regulations prescribed by the Secretary of Defense, the Secretary concerned may issue a prisoner-of-war medal to any person who, while serving in any capacity with the armed forces, was held captive under circumstances not covered by paragraph (1), (2), or (3) of subsection (a), but which the Secretary concerned finds were comparable to those circumstances under which persons have generally been held captive by enemy armed forces during periods of armed conflict." The conference managers explained that "there may be circumstances when an individual serving with the armed forces is held captive by other than an enemy armed force, by other than a hostile nation, or during times other than periods of armed conflict in conditions comparable to those in which the POW medal is now required. For this reason, the conferees recommend amendment of current law to give the service secretaries the authority to issue an award in appropriate cases where the conditions of captivity are comparable to those in which a POW is held by enemy armed forces."

Thus, the amendment has a similar legislative intent to the 1989 amendment, excepting that the language of the 1989 amendment was more ambiguous and was never fully implemented in policy. The 2013 amendment became Public Law 112–239 on January 2, 2013, with the signature of the FY2013 National Defense Authorization Act. The new DoD policy for the amendment, published on May 31, 2013, repeated the language of the amendment and specified that "[a]ward of the [POW Medal] under the comparable conditions provision is the exception and not the rule. Authority to award the [POW Medal] under this provision may not be delegated below the Secretary concerned." Additionally, the policy specified that the conflicts to be used for comparison purposes are World War I, World War II, the Korean War, and the Vietnam Conflict.

==== Precedents under 2013 amendment ====
As a result of the new policy, 143 of the Wauwilermoos airmen were authorized the medal in an October 15, 2013 decision by acting USAF Secretary Eric Fanning. Eight of the living airmen received the medal from USAF Chief of Staff Gen. Mark Welsh in a ceremony at the Pentagon on April 30, 2014.

In 2014, six Navy divers from Underwater Construction Team One were awarded the POW Medal by USN Secretary Ray Mabus. The divers were held captive in Beirut, Lebanon in 1985 after their commercial aircraft (TWA flight 847) was hijacked by Hezbollah militants. One of the divers, Robert D. Stethem, was killed on the tarmac at Beirut International Airport.

In 2022, the Army also awarded POW Medals to two former specialists, Ronald Dolecki, and David Strickland, who were both abducted at different times while serving in Ethiopia in the 1960s and 1970s. Both men were abducted by insurgent members of the Eritrean Liberation Front (ELF), which was fighting for Eritrean independence at the time. Dolecki had been unlawfully denied the medal between 2004 and 2020, under the rationale that the ELF “was not considered an opposing armed force hostile to the United States,” which was apparently a confusion over the 1989 amendment's hostility provision that had not existed for many years in law or policy. Indeed, the ELF was clearly hostile to the United States, and this was no longer required as of the revision to the Army's Awards Manual after the 2013 amendment. The House Committee on Armed Services reported in reaction that "The Department of the Army specifically has interpreted the statutory requirements in such a narrow way as to block seemingly obvious cases of eligibility," and directed DoD to brief the committee on the matter. The Senate Committee on Armed Services also reported on the matter, reflecting that "the Department of the Army has implemented regulatory hurdles that are difficult for servicemembers and next-of-kin to clear," and expressed that the 2013 amendment was intended to "broaden eligibility for the prisoner-of-war medal to those who, for reasons of law and not fact, were not eligible for the medal because they were not in a conflict or taken prisoner and held captive by a party whose legal status met the criteria . . . of the aforementioned statute."

=== Link to Purple Heart Medal ===
Due to a provision in the FY1996 National Defense Authorization Act, service secretaries are required to award the Purple Heart to any POW Medal recipients wounded in captivity. The law specified that "[a] person shall be considered to be a former prisoner of war for purposes of this section if the person is eligible for the prisoner-of-war medal under section 1128 of title 10, United States Code." The corresponding DoD regulation specifies that any "Service member who is killed or dies while in captivity" after April 5, 1917, can receive the medal, "unless compelling evidence is presented that shows that the member’s death was not the result of enemy action."

=== Penalties for misrepresentation ===
Prior to October 2011, federal law provided that any false verbal, written or physical claim to the Prisoner of War Medal, by an individual to whom it has not been awarded, shall be fined or/and imprisoned not more than six months. In October 2011, the U.S. Supreme Court struck down the Stolen Valor Act for violating the First Amendment. This effectively invalidated all legislation that criminalized false oral claims to U.S. decorations. In response, Congress passed H.R. 258, the Stolen Valor Act of 2013, which was more limited in scope and only criminalized false claims to the Medal of Honor, Distinguished Service Cross, Navy Cross, Air Force Cross, Silver Star, Purple Heart, or combat badge "with intent to obtain money, property, or other tangible benefit." Since the Prisoner of War Medal was not included, false claims to this medal are no longer criminal under this statute.

== Notable medal recipients ==
- Everett Alvarez
- Paul Airey
- Joe Beyrle
- Pappy Boyington
- Lloyd Bucher
- Llewellyn Chilson
- Rhonda Cornum
- Winfield Scott Cunningham
- Bud Day
- William F. Dean
- Dieter Dengler
- Jeremiah Denton
- James Devereux
- Michael Durant
- Gabby Gabreski
- Harold K. Johnson
- Sam Johnson
- Shoshana Johnson
- George Juskalian
- Emil Kapaun
- Jessica Lynch
- Walker M. Mahurin
- John McCain
- Patrick Miller
- Richard O'Kane
- George M. Parker
- Lori Piestewa
- Francis Gary Powers
- Donald Prell
- Paul A. Putnam
- Robinson Risner
- James N. Rowe
- Tibor Rubin
- James Stockdale
- Floyd James Thompson
- Kurt Vonnegut
- Jonathan Wainwright IV
- Louis Zamperini
