= The Sandstorm =

The Sandstorm is a history play written by playwright and Iraq War veteran Sean Huze. It was originally an eleven character play (Los Angeles 2004–2005). It later became a ten character play after revisions for the East Coast debut in Washington, D.C. (2005). The play premiered in Los Angeles, California, in September 2004 for a limited engagement directed by Marlon Hoffman at Gardner Stages, a small 30 seat basement theater in Hollywood, California. It received a "rave," an overwhelmingly positive review, from the Los Angeles Times calling the play "a heart clutching eye witness mosaic," and praised its "shocking force and awesome honesty". Due to first-time playwright and cast member Sean Huze being an active-duty Marine on leave, he returned to his duty station at Camp Lejeune, North Carolina, and the play's brief run closed in October 2004.

Huze received an honorable discharge from the United States Marine Corps on March 7, 2005. Ten days later, on March 17, 2005, The Sandstorm: Stories from the Front reopened in Los Angeles under the direction of David Fofi, produced by Iraq and Afghanistan Veterans of America (known then as OpTruth), B. Mark Seabrooks, and Elephant Theatre Company, at The Elephant Asylum Theater on Theatre Row Hollywood. Theater critic Terry Morgan for Backstage selecting the play as his "Critic's Pick" in the March 24, 2005 issue of Backstage in addition to writing a rave review in which he states, "This show, in addition to being well-done and undeniably affecting, honors the experiences—good and bad—of our soldiers in Iraq, and, in a time when everything concerning the war has long since been politicized into babble, it deserves to be seen and heard."

The Sandstorm's run in Los Angeles wrapped in July, 2005. The show opened at MetroStages in Alexandria, Virginia, serving the Washington D.C. area a month later in August, 2005. Reviews were generally positive, but The Washington Post's critic left no ambiguity as to her disdain in her review which ran the same day the Post's arts editor made Sandstorm a "Critics Pick". The Post sent another critic to "re-review" the production and his review was considerably more positive and he recommended it to audiences.
