= Advanced Reconnaissance Vehicle =

US Marine Corps vehicle development program

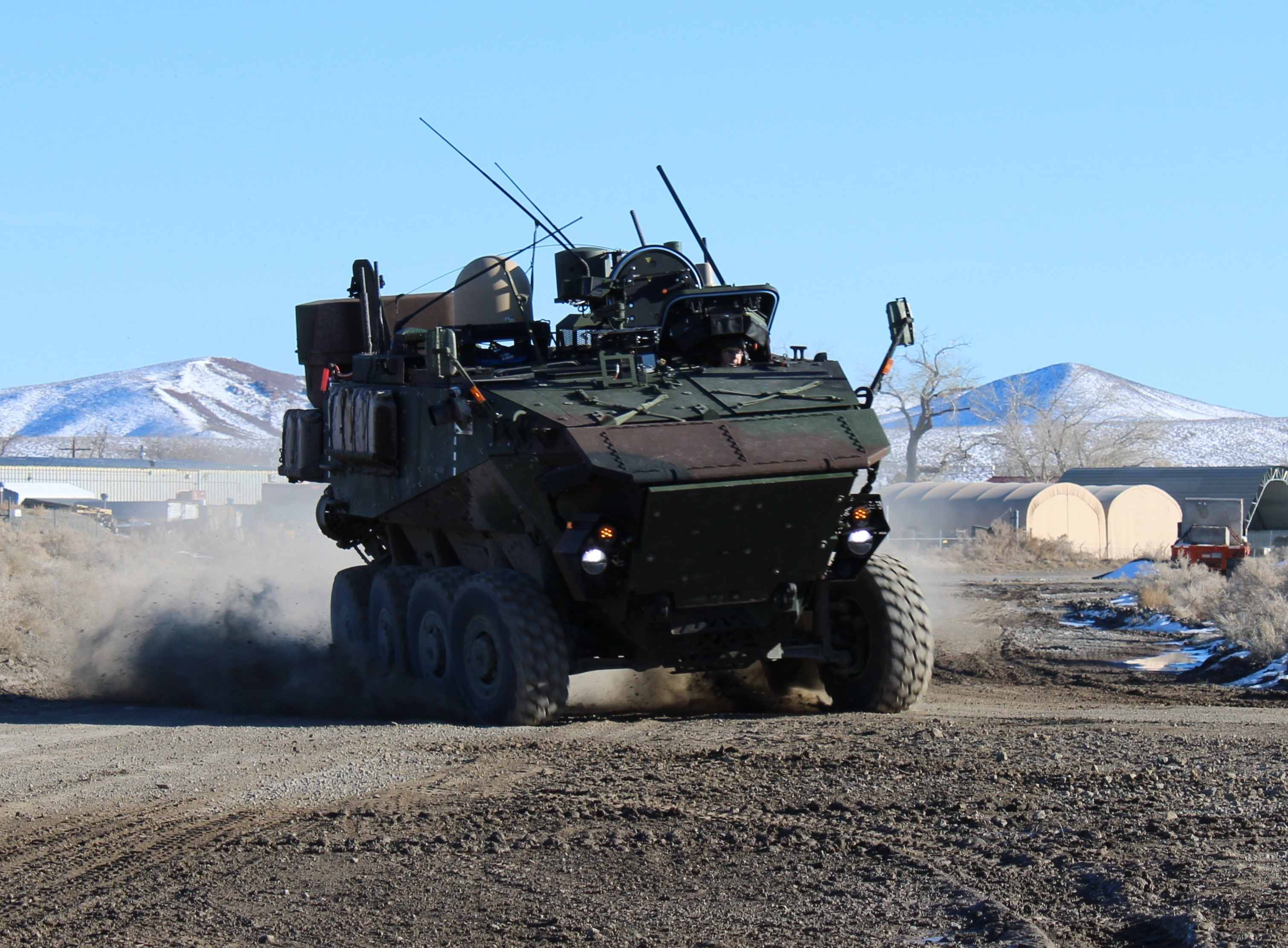
GDLS ARV C4/UAS Prototype

The Advanced Reconnaissance Vehicle (ARV) is an armored vehicle program initiated by the United States Marine Corps (USMC) to replace the aging LAV-25 family of vehicles, which has been in service since 1983. Designed as part of the Marine Corps' modernization efforts, the ARV is intended to provide enhanced mobility, reconnaissance capabilities, and integrated electronic warfare (EW) functions. The U.S. Marine Corps plans for a number of ARV variants. The first variant is the Command, Control, Communications and Computers/Unmanned Aircraft Systems (ARV C4/UAS) version, and the second variant is the ARV-30, which is a variant armed with a 30 mm autocannon.

== Background and requirements ==
=== Program origins ===
The LAV, which has played a significant role in Marine Air-Ground Task Force (MAGTF) missions, is set to be phased out by the mid-2030s. To address evolving battlefield needs, the Marine Corps conceptualized the ARV as a highly mobile, networked, and lethal platform capable of operating in modern combat environments. The program seeks to improve reconnaissance capabilities while maintaining protection and mobility in diverse terrains.

=== Operational requirements ===
The Marine Corps outlined several desired operational capabilities for the ARV, including:

- An automatic medium-caliber cannon for fire support.
- Anti-armor capabilities to engage close-in heavy threats.
- Precision-guided munitions (PGMs) for long-range engagements.
- Unmanned systems integration, including aerial and ground-based reconnaissance assets.
- Advanced electronic warfare (EW) capabilities to counter enemy communications and sensors.
- Passive and active protection systems for survivability.
- High mobility across various terrains, including shore-to-shore water mobility.

== Development and testing ==
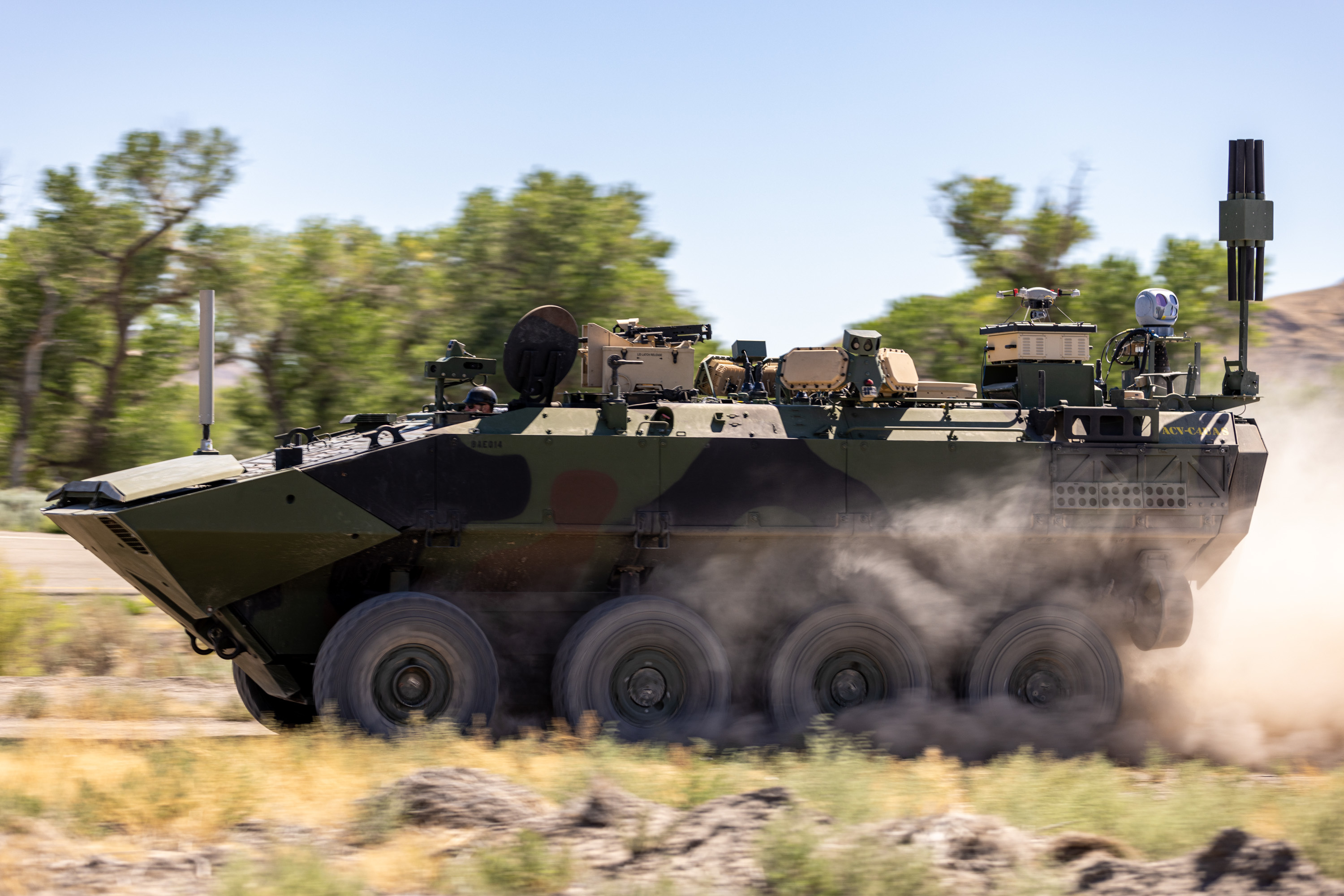
BAE C4UAS Prototype

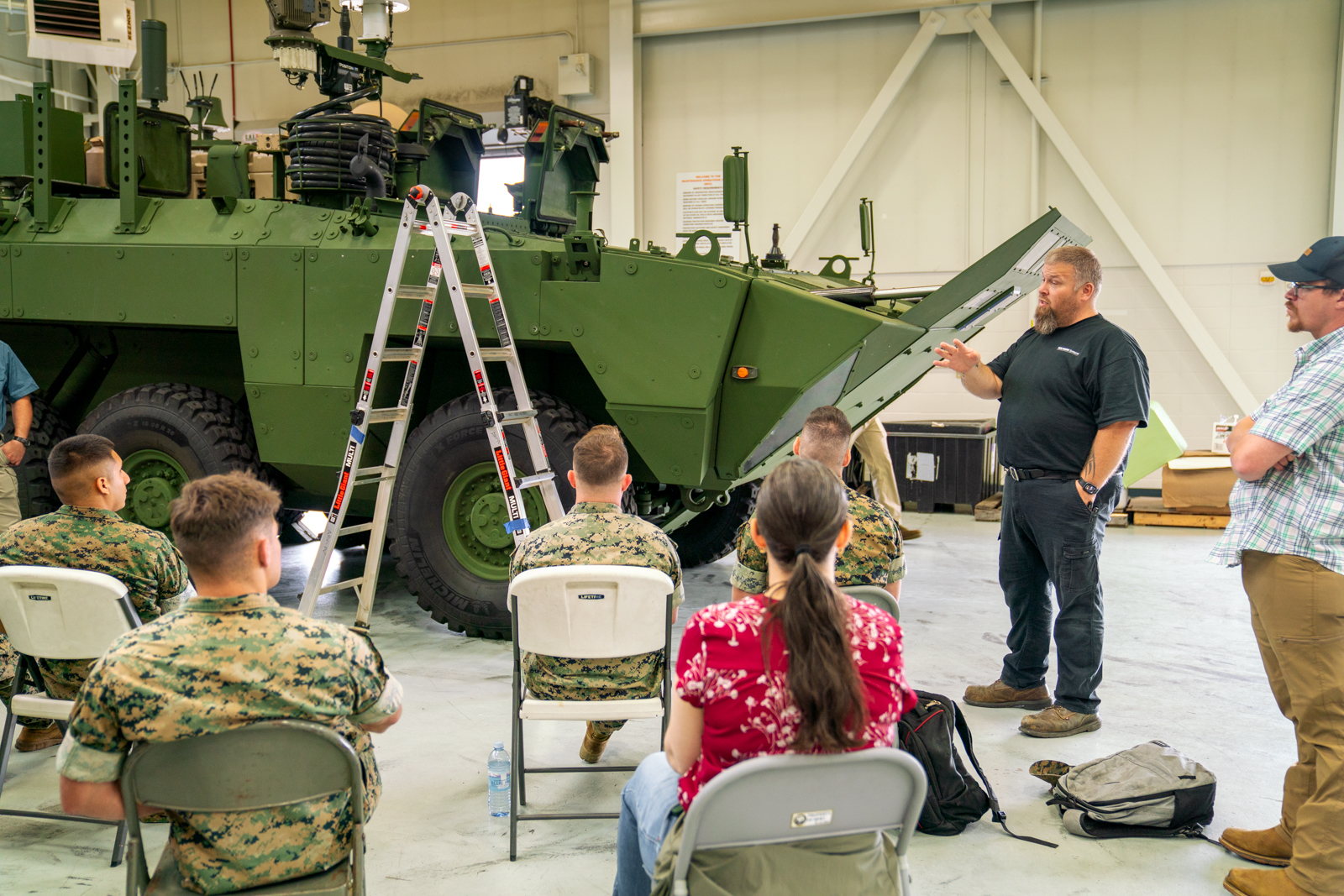
Textron ARV C4/UAS at Detroit Arsenal in June, 2024

In July 2021, the Marine Corps selected Textron Systems and General Dynamics Land Systems (GDLS) to develop ARV prototypes. The first prototypes, Textron’s "Cottonmouth" and General Dynamics’ prototype, were delivered in December 2022 for testing at the Marine Corps’ Nevada Automotive Test Center.

By February 2023, the Marine Corps began testing three ARV prototypes, including an additional design submitted by BAE Systems, which was based on the Amphibious Combat Vehicle (ACV). The evaluation process focused on:

- The ARV’s ability to navigate mission-representative terrain.
- The effectiveness of its command, control, communications, and computing (C4) capabilities.
- Integration with unmanned aerial systems (UAS).

On March 6, 2024, the Marine Corps awarded Textron and General Dynamics contracts to develop an "ARV-30" prototype, featuring a 30mm autocannon. These prototypes are expected to be delivered by FY2025, with full-scale procurement planned for FY2028.

Testing of the C4/UAS ARV took place from March to December 2024 at the Michigan Technological University Keweenaw Research Center in Calumet, Michigan, and the US Army’s Ground Vehicle Systems Center at Detroit Arsenal in Warren, Michigan. GDLS has also developed a Systems Integration Lab (SIL) to replicate the interior of the Command, Control, Communications, Computers/Unmanned Aerial Systems (C4/UAS) vehicle for testing and crew training. A second SIL is set to be delivered in 2025. These labs are designed to validate the integration of C4 and intelligence systems and allow Marines to train in simulated combat scenarios.

== ARV C4/UAS ==
The Command, Control, Communications, Computers/Unmanned Aerial Systems (C4/UAS) variant is designed to serve as the central command hub on the battlefield, processing large volumes of data from Pentagon and Marine Corps networks while enabling Marines to make real-time decisions based on incoming information.

=== Textron ===
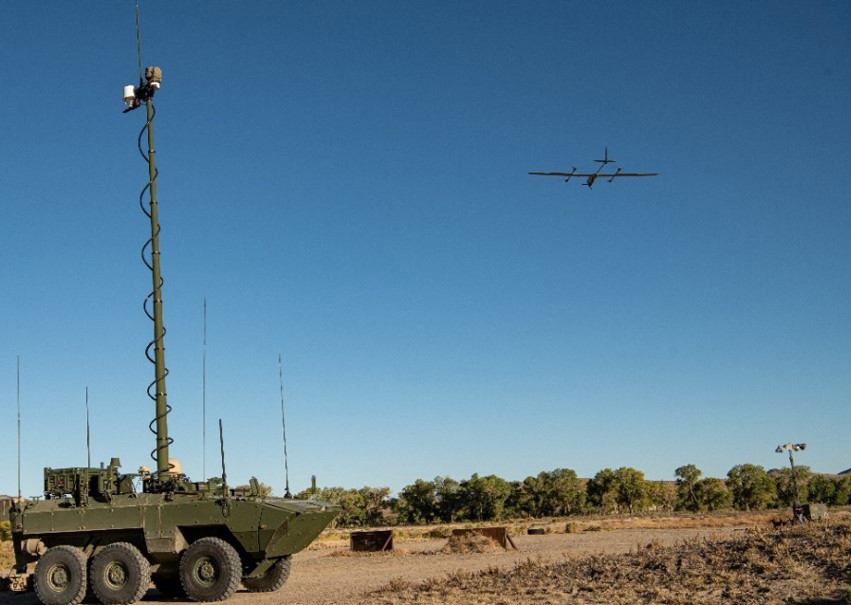
Textron ARV C4/UAS Prototype

The "Cottonmouth" ARV prototype, from Textron Systems, has a capacity for two crew members and five embarked Marines, the vehicle measures 295 inches (750 cm) in length, 115 inches (290 cm) in width, and 147 inches (370 cm) in height, with a gross weight of 37,000 pounds (17,000 kg). It boasts a maximum speed of 65 mph (105 km/h) and is capable of navigating surf zones with waves over 4 feet (1.2 m) at a maximum speed of 5 knots (9.3 km/h). Designed for amphibious operations, it is self-deployable and transportable via LCAC and SSC platforms, accommodating up to four vehicles. Its open architecture supports future system integrations, enhancing adaptability for evolving mission requirements.

=== GDLS ===
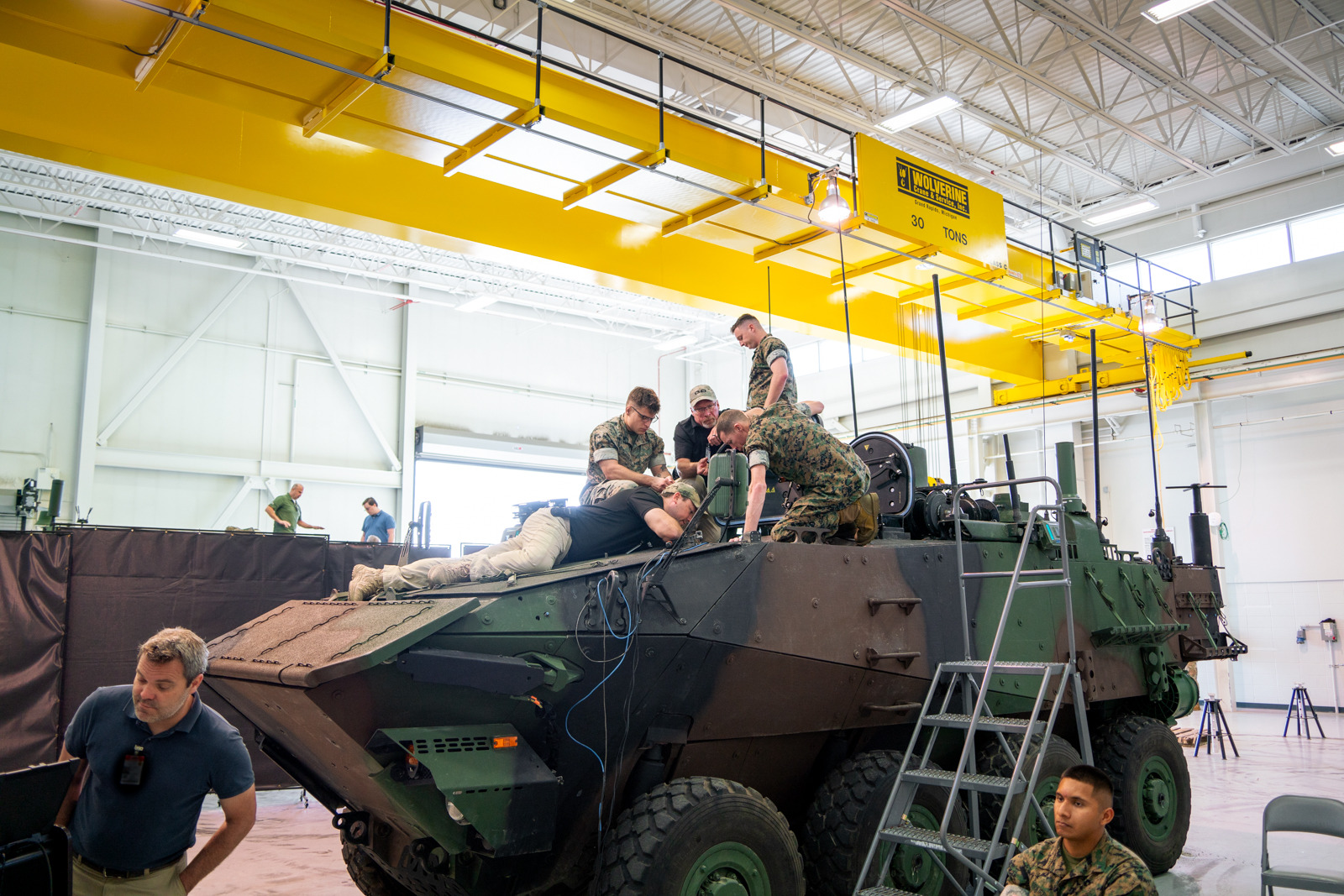
GDLS ARV C4/UAS at Detroit Arsenal in June 2024

General Dynamics Land Systems has successfully tested its Advanced Reconnaissance Vehicle (ARV) Command, Control, Communications, Computers/Unmanned Aerial Systems (C4/UAS) variant with the U.S. Marine Corps. Designed for future Mobile Reconnaissance Battalions, the ARV acts as the "quarterback" on a multi-domain battlefield, connecting to sensors, UAS, and future robotic systems. Its design offers growth flexibility with a modular open architecture, allowing for the rapid integration of new technologies. Additionally, the vehicle incorporates the company’s Next Generation Electronic Architecture, supporting artificial intelligence capabilities and robotic system control to meet future requirements. The ARV's extensive 2024 testing focused on land mobility, maintenance, logistics, and training, with enhancements like digital maintenance systems and a next-gen Digital Training System. Highly mobile both on land and water, the ARV's capabilities will continue to evolve as General Dynamics completes manufacturing and delivers prototypes in 2025 for further testing.

== ARV-30 ==
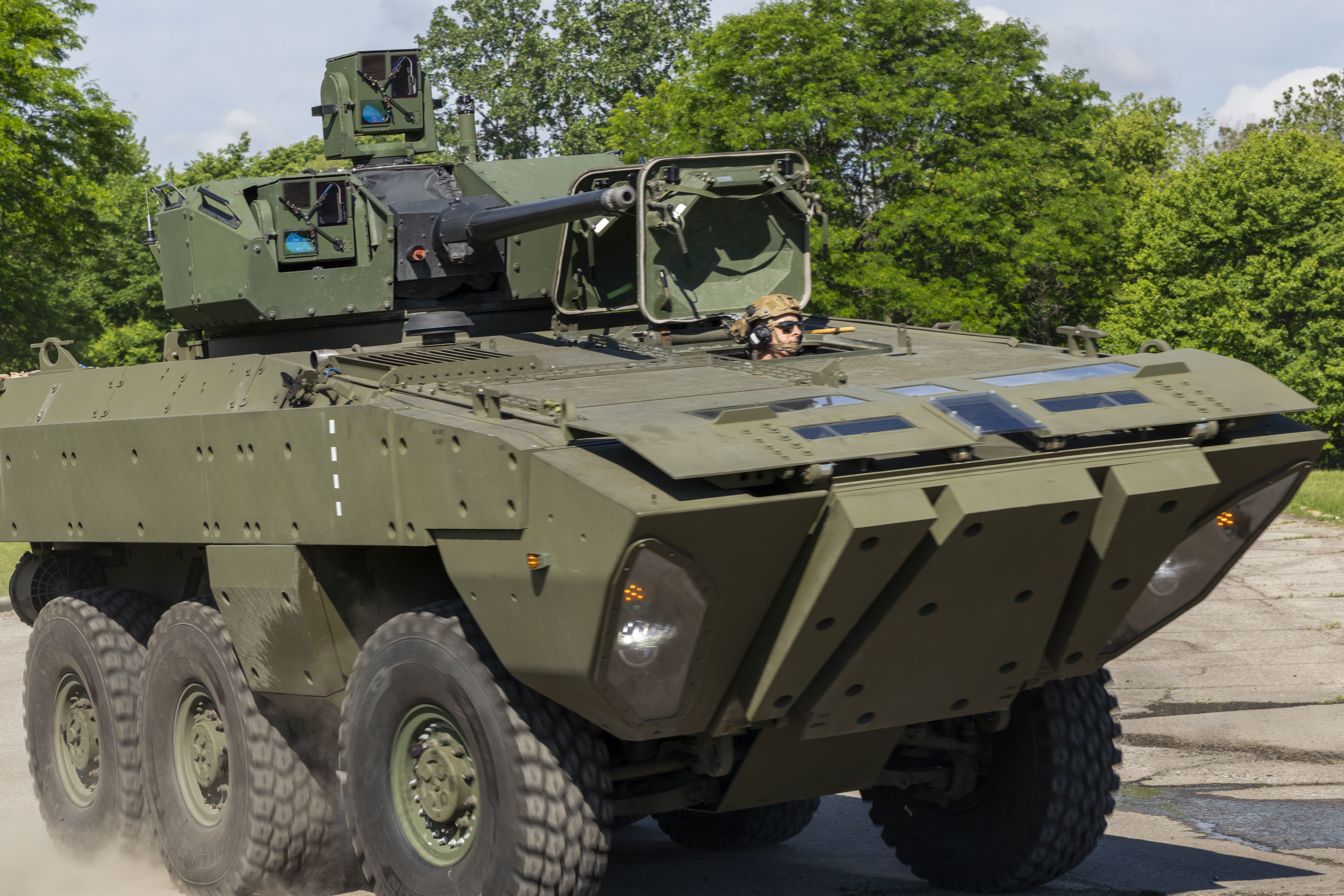
Textron ARV-30

The ARV-30 will provide greater capability than the current LAV-25 and meet the Marine Corps' requirements for Force Design 2030. It will be equipped with advanced features such as an automatic 30mm medium-caliber cannon, anti-armor capability, modern command-and-control systems, and a full range of advanced sensors. The ARV-30 aims to combine the turret and weapon system found on the ACV-30.

General Dynamics Land Systems (GDLS) is leading the development of the ARV-30 variant, which features a 30mm autocannon. The Marine Corps expects to procure approximately 500 ARV-30s. GDLS plans to deliver a prototype armed ARV-30 to the USMC for trials in 2025, following a series of tests and demonstrations of the C4/UAS ARV prototype in 2024.

== Role in force structure ==
Initially, the ARV was intended to serve as the primary combat system in Light Armored Reconnaissance (LAR) Battalions, whose mission includes mounted and dismounted reconnaissance, surveillance, and security operations. LAR Battalions also engage in offensive, defensive, and deception operations to support Marine Division commanders.

However, the Marine Corps’ Force Design 2030 initiative, launched in March 2020, raised questions about the ARV’s role in future operations. Former Commandant General David Berger expressed skepticism about the continued reliance on manned, wheeled reconnaissance vehicles, particularly in the Indo-Pacific region, suggesting the need for alternative solutions such as multi-domain reconnaissance assets.

== Budget and future considerations ==
For FY2025, the U.S. Department of Defense allocated $63.736 million for the ARV under Research, Development, Test & Evaluation (RDT&E). Despite continued development, uncertainty remains regarding its long-term viability due to shifting operational doctrines and force design updates.

Congress has raised several oversight questions regarding the ARV’s relevance, cost-effectiveness, and alignment with emerging reconnaissance strategies. While procurement is planned for FY2028, ongoing evaluations may determine whether the ARV will be fully adopted or modified to fit evolving battlefield requirements.

== See also ==
- United States Marine Corps Light Armored Reconnaissance – Battalion units
- LAV-25
- Amphibious Combat Vehicle (ACV)
- Force Design 2030
- Unmanned Aerial Systems (UAS)
