= Fourth Armored =

Fourth Armored may refer to:

- 4th Armored Division (United States)
- 4th Light Armored Reconnaissance Battalion
