= 4th Light Armored Reconnaissance Battalion =

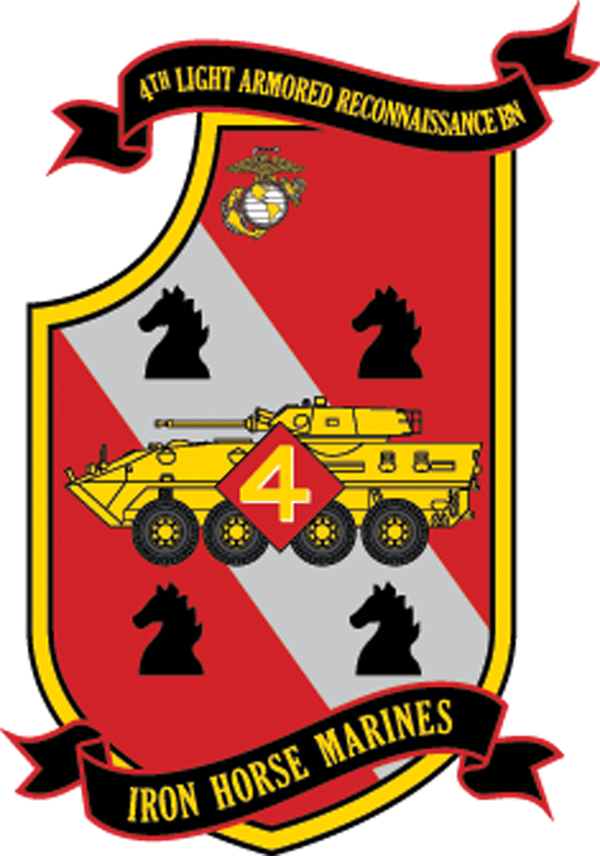
- 4th LAR Insignia
- Founded: September 23, 1987; 39 years ago
- Country: United States of America
- Branch: United States Marine Corps
- Type: Armored reconnaissance battalion
- Role: Screen in advance of maneuver units
- Part of: 4th Marine Division; Marine Forces Reserve
- Garrison/HQ: Marine Corps Base Camp Pendleton
- Nickname: Iron Horse Marines
- Mascot: Neapolitan Mastiff
- Engagements: Operation Desert Storm; Iraq War: 2003 invasion of Iraq; War in Afghanistan (2001-2021)

4th Light Armored Reconnaissance Battalion (4th LARB) is a United States Marine Corps Light Armored Reconnaissance battalion of the Marine Corps Reserve. Their primary weapon system is the LAV-25 and they are part of the 4th Marine Division and Marine Forces Reserve. The unit headquarters is at Camp Pendleton, California, but other units in the battalion are located throughout the United States. 4th LAR Bn is the largest combat battalion in the Marine Corps, with 7 companies.

== Mission ==
The 4th LAR in Iraq, June 2003.

The LAR battalion performs combined arms reconnaissance and security missions in support of the Ground Combat Element (GCE) of a Marine Air-Ground Task Force (MAGTF). Its mission is to conduct reconnaissance, security and economy of force operations, and, within its capabilities, limited offensive or defensive operations that exploit the unit’s mobility and firepower.

The LAR battalion may function as an independent maneuver element or as an element of a larger unit such as a regimental combat team, or its subordinate companies may support other tactical units in the GCE.

== Organization ==
Name	Location
Headquarters and Service Company (HSC)	Camp Pendleton, California
Alpha Company (A Company)	Camp Pendleton, California
Bravo Company (B Company)	Fort Detrick, Maryland
Charlie Company (C Company)	Boise, Idaho
Delta Company (D Company)	Quantico, Virginia
Echo Company (E Company)	Syracuse, New York
Fox Company (F Company)	Eastover, South Carolina

An LAV platoon consists of 4 vehicles usually divided into Alpha section and Bravo section. The platoon commander will control one section and also be the vehicle commander (VC) of one of the LAV's and the platoon sergeant will control the other section and serve as a VC as well.

A crew consists of a driver, usually the least senior 0313 (MOS designation for LAV Crewman), a VC and the gunner. The gunner operates the main gun, the M242 Bushmaster chaingun. The VC makes target acquisition changes and helps the gunner make adjustments. The remaining crew consists of Scouts (0311). The LAV can hold four scouts, but under the Table of Organization, there are only three assigned per vehicle. There is also one mechanic and one corpsman per platoon.

== History ==
=== The 1980s and 1990s ===
The 4th Light Armored Vehicle Battalion was activated on September 23, 1987. On 13 November 1990, half of Company A and a portion Headquarters and Service Company were activated in support of operation Desert Shield/ Storm. The Light company was augmented by Marines for Company F, 2/25 and company D, 1st LAV Battalion. Company A 4th LAV BN ultimately augmented the 1st Marine Division as part of RLT5 of the 5th Marine Expeditionary Brigade 5th MEB. Company A, 4th LAV specifically augmented the 2nd and 3rd Battalions of the 5th Marine regiment. In December 1990, the rest of the battalion was activated to augment 2nd Light Armored Vehicle Battalion (see 2nd Light Armored Reconnaissance Battalion) for deployment to the Kingdom of Saudi Arabia. From December 26, 1990, to April 24, 1991, deployed to the Kingdom of Saudi Arabia as part of Operation Desert Shield and Operation Desert Storm. The Battalion's assets were spread out over hundreds of miles of desert terrain and were utilized by the Marine Command to constantly probe the boundaries of Iraqi controlled areas. The Battalion executed Reconnaissance and Counter Reconnaissance Operations, emergency extraction of friendly forces, breaching of berms and minefields along the Iraqi and Kuwait border and prisoner capture and control. As part of the 5th Marine Expeditionary Brigade (MEB), it was also part of a Contingency Joint Task Force in Bangladesh during Operation Sea Angel to provide humanitarian relief in the aftermath of Cyclone Marian. On October 1, 1996, the battalion was re-designated as the 4th Light Armored Reconnaissance Battalion.

=== Afghanistan and Iraq ===
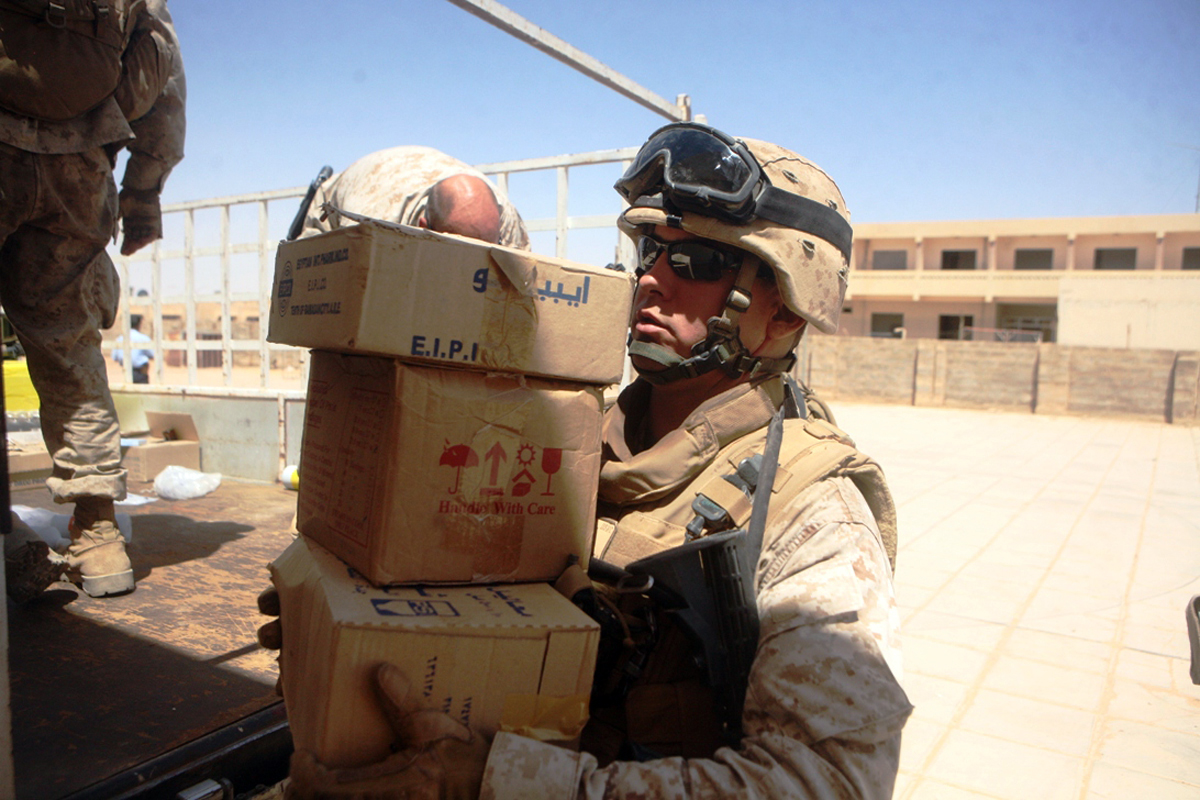
A corpsman with Delta Co., 4th Light Armored Reconnaissance Battalion, delivers medical supplies to be issued to more than 200 Iraqis during a cooperative medical engagement in Akashat.

From February 24, 2003, to October 1, 2003, 4th LAR deployed to Iraq as part of the 2003 invasion of Iraq. Alpha and Bravo companies were mobilized in early February 2003 and deployed with 1st and 3rd LAR Battalions respectively, participating in the 2003 invasion of Iraq. The remainder of the battalion was activated in early March 2003 and quickly deployed to Iraq.

In April 2003, Delta Company 1st Platoon and H&S Company Black Sheep Platoon, 2nd Section was attached to 2nd Battalion 8th Marines as part of Task Force Rebel. Task Force Rebel was tasked with patrolling and securing the city of Al Kut in the Wasit province. In May 2003 the battalion was reconstituted as a whole and conducted surveillance and reconnaissance operations along the Iraq/Iran Border. On June 2, 2003, the battalion moved to the 1st Marine Division HQ, located in Al Hilla to act as the Division quick reaction force. Bravo Company was based in Ad Diwaniyah, and generally conducted missions separately from the rest of the battalion. On June 13, 2003 Task Force Scorpion was activated and moved to the Northern Babil province with orders to secure Army convoy routes in and out of Forward Operating Base Dogwood. The core of Task Force Scorpion was initially formed around 4th Light Armored Reconnaissance Battalion, consisting initially of H&S and Alpha Companies, 4th LAR; Co C, 1st Battalion 4th Marines, Co I (Rein), 3rd Battalion, 7th Marines, Co E, 2nd Battalion, 5th Marines, two platoons from Force Reconnaissance; an Explosive Ordnance Disposal (EOD) detachment; and elements of Radio Battalion. The Task Force was later reinforced with Delta Company and two other active duty infantry companies from 1st Battalion 7th Marines. Task Force Scorpion's offensive posture and heavy patrolling effectively reduced the number of attacks on American soldiers in the area. The battalion conducted numerous raids and was eventually awarded the Presidential Unit Citation for its work as part of I Marine Expeditionary Force.

Since OIF I, marines from the battalion have continued to support ongoing combat and security operations associated with the Global War on Terror. Several marines returned to Iraq with the 1st Marine Division, serving as members of the Division Commander's Personal Security Detachment and as military advisers to Iraqi infantry units. In 2006, members of Co A and H&S Company were mobilized and formed the 4th Provisional Security Company and deployed to the Horn of Africa. Also Co B was mobilized and returned to Iraq on October 11, 2006, to serve Dam Security Unit-3 conducting riverine reconnaissance, support, and security operations from Al-Qa'im to Fallujah. They returned to the United States on April 1, 2007 In June 2007, Marines of Company C were mobilized and attached to 1st Battalion 10th Marines as part of Task Force Military Police. Stationed in Fallujah, they conducted police and security operations, including convoy security and detainee movements, throughout the Anbar Province and returned home in April 2008. In December 2007, Marines of Company D were mobilized and attached to 2nd Light Armored Reconnaissance Battalion out of Camp Lejeune for their deployment in support of OIF. They operated with 2nd LAR along the Syrian border and covered an area as large as South Carolina. The Marines of Delta Company were operating out of a train station in the town of Akashat, north of Camp Korean Village. They returned to the United States in October 2008, and were replaced by Fox Company and Marines from 2/25. Fox Company 4th LAR remained at Akashat until October 2008 before moving north to Al Ambar Provence. South of Sinjar Mountains and as far west as Syria. Fox Company Marines attached to 1st LAR returned to Al Asad in March 2009 after setting an OIF record of a confirmed 94 days spent in field with logistic support. Fox Company Marines returned home April 20, 2009, to Eastover, S.C. This record was later broken and nearly doubled by Company E from Syracuse, NY during their 2009 deployment along the Syrian border, north of the Sinjar mountains. It remains the longest continuous period spent on non-stop operations during the Iraq war.

In September 2009, the unit mobilized for deployment in Afghanistan. H&S, Alpha, Bravo, Charlie, and a handful of Marines from Delta and Fox were activated, and trained for a six-month deployment schedule of November 2009 to May 2010. They returned home on May 30, 2010.

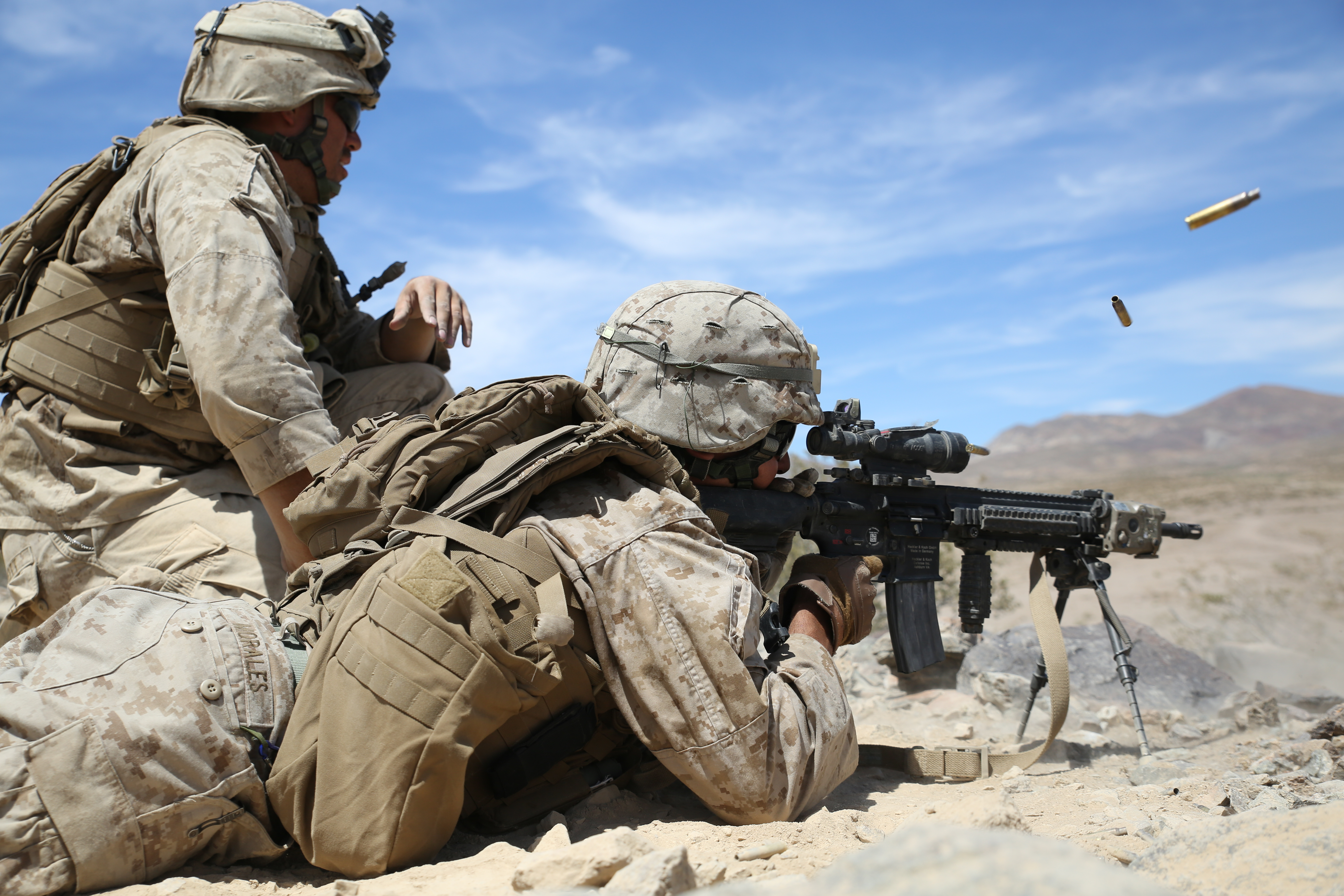
4th LAR completed a multitude of live-fire exercises and tested the capabilities of the companies during Annual Training at Army National Training Center Fort Irwin, California, in July 2014.

In July 2014, the Battalion completed their largest training exercise in years in the Mojave Desert. This was the first time since the battalion’s deployment to Afghanistan in 2009 – 2010 that all the companies, with the exception of Company A, were able to train together. The large training area gave the Marines a chance to use all of the weaponry available on the LAVs and the chance to use the Mine Clearing Lane Charge. Additionally, the Marines had a chance to fire the M242 Bushmaster chain gun, the M240 machine gun and anti-tank guided missiles. Marines also fired a MICLIC, which consists of a rocket tethered to thousands of pounds of C-4 explosives from an LAV. The MICLIC clears out mines and any obstacles, and gives the LAVs a safe and clear path to travel through. The Marines also fired an Anti-Personal Obstacle Breaching System (APOBS) that consists of two backpacks that fire a smaller rocket with tethered grenades that makes a safe path for Marines. In addition to the firepower on the LAVs, the scouts had a chance to engage the enemy in live-fire exercises with the M4 Service Rifle, M27 Infantry Automatic Rifle and M136 AT4 Rocket Launcher.

== Unit Awards ==
- Meritorious Unit Commendation
  - Desert Shield/Storm 1990-1991
- Presidential Unit Citation W 1/ bronze star
  - Iraq-2003
  - Afghanistan-2009-2010 (MEB-PUC)
- Navy Unit Commendation W/2 bronze stars
  - Iraq - 2006
  - Iraq - 2007 II MEF FWD (MARADMIN 055/12)
  - Iraq - 2008 I MEF FWD (MARADMIN 056/12)
- National Defense Service Streamer W/1 bronze star
- Afghanistan Campaign Streamer W/1 Campaign Star
- Iraq Campaign Streamer W/4 Campaign Stars
- Global War on Terrorism Service Streamer
- Global War on Terrorism Expeditionary Streamer
- Nato ISAF Streamer

== See also ==
- List of United States Marine Corps battalions (including equipment)
- Organization of the United States Marine Corps
