= LAV-25 =

Canadian/American reconnaissance vehicle

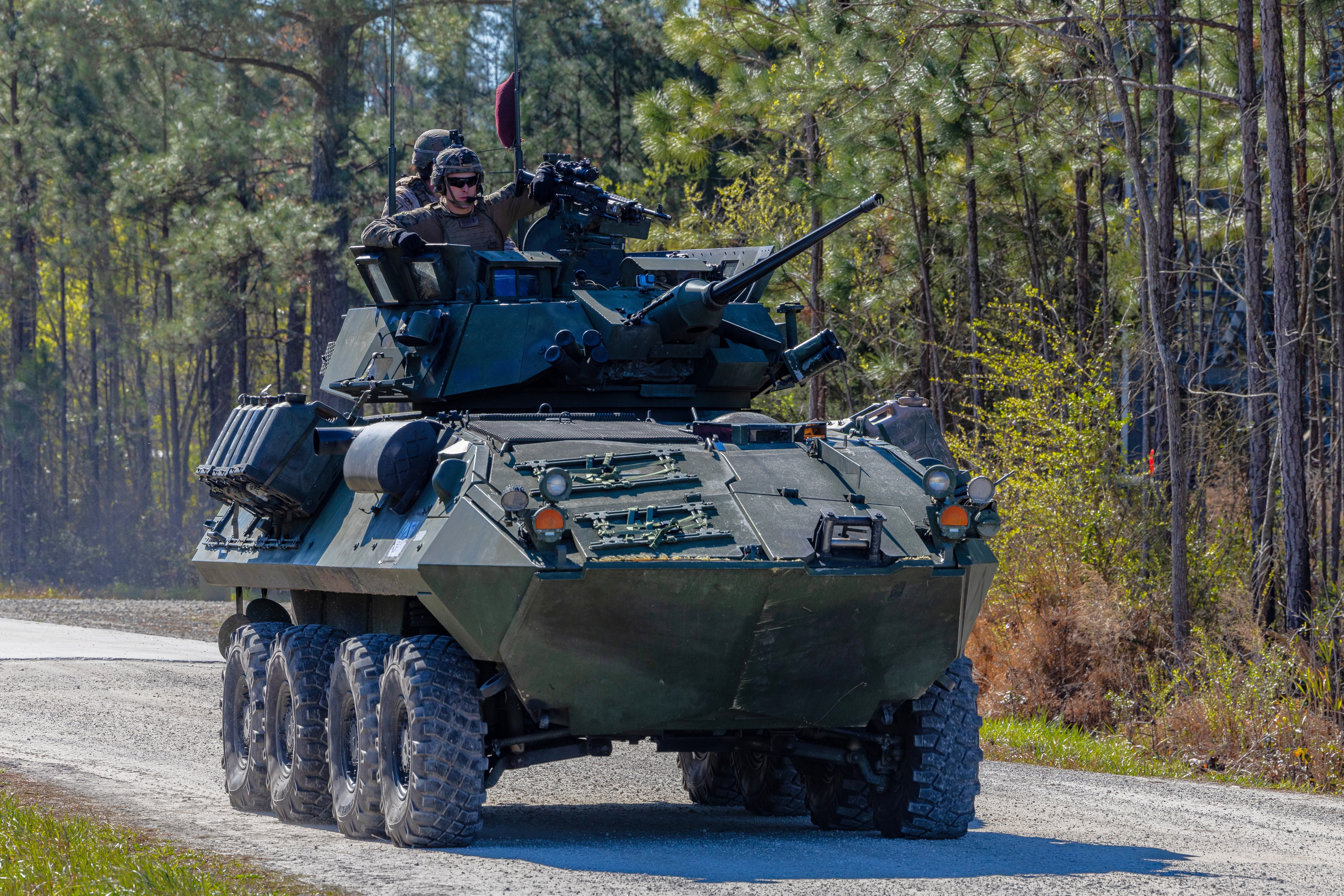
- LAV-25A2
- Type: Armored reconnaissance vehicle–infantry fighting vehicle
- Place of origin: Canada/United States

Service history
- In service: 1983–present
- Wars: U.S. invasion of Panama; Persian Gulf War; Operation Uphold Democracy; War in Afghanistan; Iraq War

Production history
- Designer: General Motors Diesel (later General Dynamics Land Systems)
- Manufacturer: General Motors Diesel (later GDLS)

Specifications
- Mass: LAV-25: 12.80 t (14.11 short tons); LAV-25A2: 14.4 t (15.87 short tons)
- Length: 6.39 m (21 ft 0 in)
- Width: 2.50 m (8 ft 2 in)
- Height: 2.69 m (8 ft 10 in)
- Crew: 3+6
- Armor: Welded steel
- Main armament: M242 Bushmaster 25 mm chain gun with 210 rounds of ammunition
- Secondary armament: Two M240 7.62 mm machine guns with 660 rounds of ammunition, one mounted co-axially and one pintle-mounted on the roof
- Engine: Detroit Diesel 6V53T; 300 hp (205 kW)
- Power/weight: LAV-25: 21.26 hp/st (16.02 kW/t) LAV-25A2: 18.89 hp/st (14.24 kW/t)
- Transmission: Allison MT653
- Suspension: 8×8 wheeled
- Operational range: 660 km (410 mi)
- Maximum speed: 100 km/h (62 mph) on road 10.4 km/h (6.5 mph) in water

The LAV-25 (Light Armored Vehicle) is a member of the LAV II family. It is an eight-wheeled amphibious armored reconnaissance vehicle built by General Dynamics Land Systems and used by the United States Marine Corps and the United States Army.

== History ==
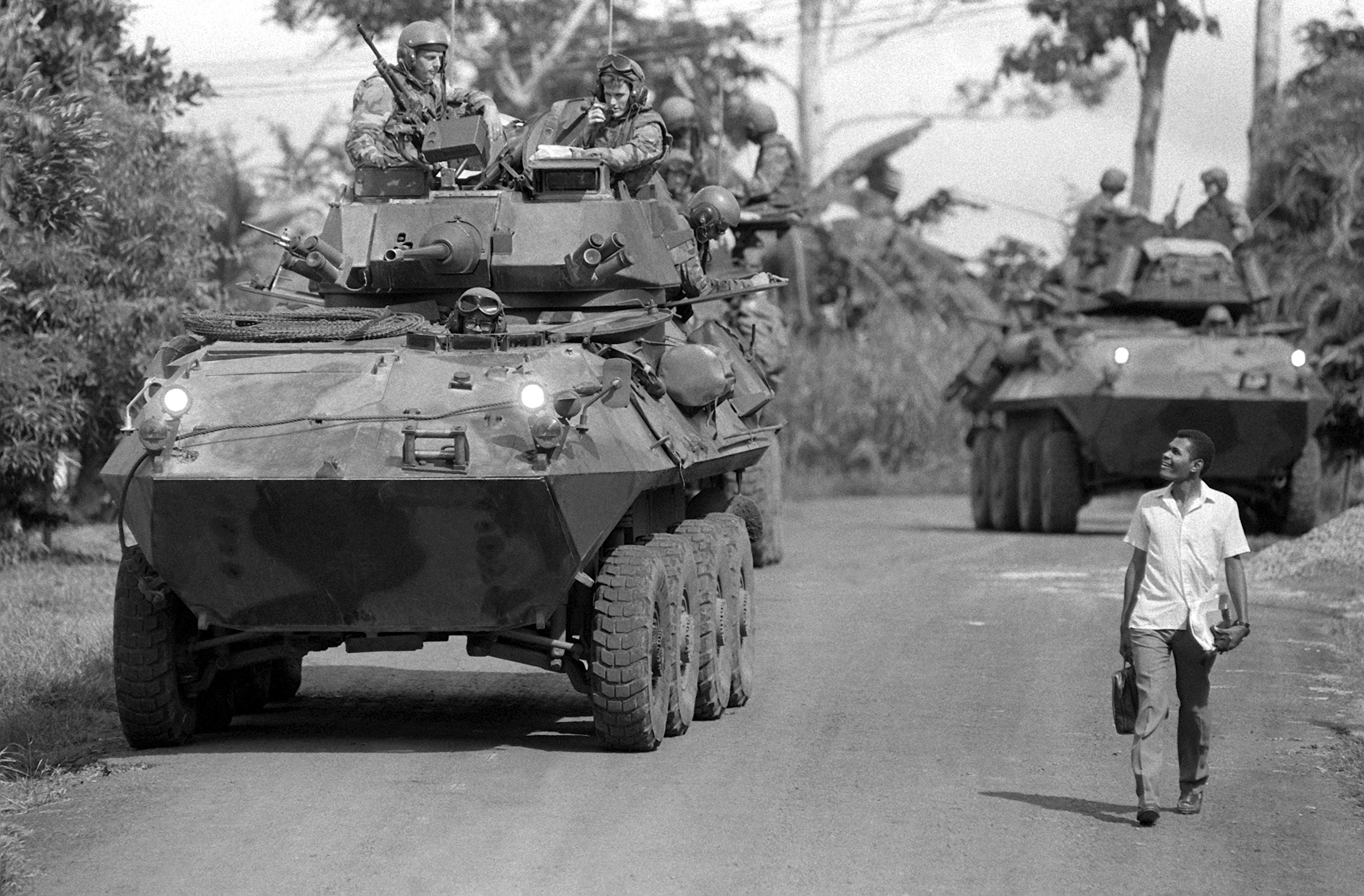
Two U.S. Marine LAV-25s in Panama during Operation Just Cause.

During the 1980s, the U.S. Marine Corps began looking for a light armored vehicle (LAV) to give its divisions greater mobility.

In April 1981, the United States Department of Defense opened submissions to the LAV program. Three contractors were downselected.

- Alvis – A Scorpion 90 and three Scorpion APCs.
- Cadillac Gage – A V-150S (a stretched V-150 Cadillac Gage Commando) and a V-300.
- General Motors of Canada (General Motors Diesel) – an 8X8 developed from a license-built copy of the Mowag Piranha 6X6

The Marine Corps evaluated the three LAV submissions. In September 1982, the General Motors submission was selected. GM was awarded initial production contract for 969 LAVs. The Army type designated the 25 mm gun variant as the M1047. The Army sought 2,350 of the 12.7 mm (.50) caliber-armed light squad carrier variant, and at one point was expected to be the LAV's biggest buyer. Congress canceled funds for the LAV-25, causing the Army to drop out of the program. The Marine Corps managed to secure enough funding to buy 758 LAVs in six variants.

The LAV entered service with the Marines in 1983. The Army borrowed at least a dozen LAV-25s for use by the 82nd Airborne Division, 3 squadron-73rd Armor for a scout platoon during the Gulf War. These LAV-25s were returned to the Marine Corps after the conflict. The USMC ordered 758 vehicles of all variants. LAVs first saw combat during the invasion of Panama in 1989 and continued service in the Persian Gulf War, Iraq War, and the War in Afghanistan.

As of 2023, the table of organization and equipment for a U.S. Marine Corps light-armored reconnaissance (LAR) battalion includes 46 LAV-25s, 12 LAV-ATs, 12 LAV-C2s, 18 LAV-Ls, 6 LAV-Ms, 6 LAV-Rs, and 4 LAV-MEWSS vehicles.

=== Replacement ===
The LAV platform is planned to remain in service with the Marine Corps until 2035. The Marines aimed to have prototypes for the LAV's replacement, dubbed the Advanced Reconnaissance Vehicle (ARV), by 2023. The ARV was initially planned to be a networked family of wheeled vehicles capable of performing various mission sets, with 500 to be procured.

In April 2021, the Marines revealed they had shifted focus to new capabilities for performing reconnaissance rather than specific types of platforms, and that the LAV-25 replacement may not be a new armored vehicle. Nevertheless, proposals for Advanced Reconnaissance Vehicle prototypes were due in May 2021; requirements were for a vehicle with a tethered unmanned aircraft system (UAS) and an open architecture approach allowing for integration of capabilities including battle management systems and communications suites, weighing less than 18.5 tons and being small enough to fit four on a Ship-to-Shore Connector. Vendors that submitted proposals include General Dynamics Land Systems, Textron, and BAE Systems. The Marine Corps plans to make up to three awards for ARV prototypes for testing and evaluation, then choose up to two to continue into a competitive engineering and manufacturing development phase in 2024, after which a decision will be made as to whether production will be pursued.

Textron and GDLS were awarded Other Transaction Authority (OTA) contracts in July 2021 for prototypes to be built and evaluated over the next two years. BAE Systems will also participate in a separate technical study to see if a variant of its Amphibious Combat Vehicle can meet ARV requirements.

There are planned to be six ARV variants: command, control, communications and computers-unmanned aerial system (C4/UAS); organic precision fire-mounted; counter-UAS; 30 mm autocannon and ATGM; logistics; and recovery.

== Design ==
Developed from the AVGP family built by General Dynamics Land Systems, the LAV-25 is powered by a 6V53T Detroit Diesel turbo-charged engine, they are four-wheel drive (rear wheels) transferable to Eight-wheel drive. These vehicles are also amphibious, meaning they have the ability to "swim" but are limited to non-surf bodies of water (no oceans). While engaged in amphibious operations, the maximum speed is approximately 12 km/h (7.5 mph) using equipped propellers. The current Service Life Extension Program (SLEP) modifications will hinder or eliminate amphibious operations.

Typical land speeds are approximately 100 km/h (62.5 mph) in either 4- or 8-wheel drive; however, fuel economy decreases in 8-wheel drive. The vehicles operate on diesel fuel. They are equipped with a 25 mm M242 Bushmaster autocannon, two 7.62 mm M240 machine guns, and two four-barrel smoke grenade launchers located on the forward left and right sides of the turret. The crew is three; vehicle commander, gunner, and driver; and four passengers (scouts) with combat gear.

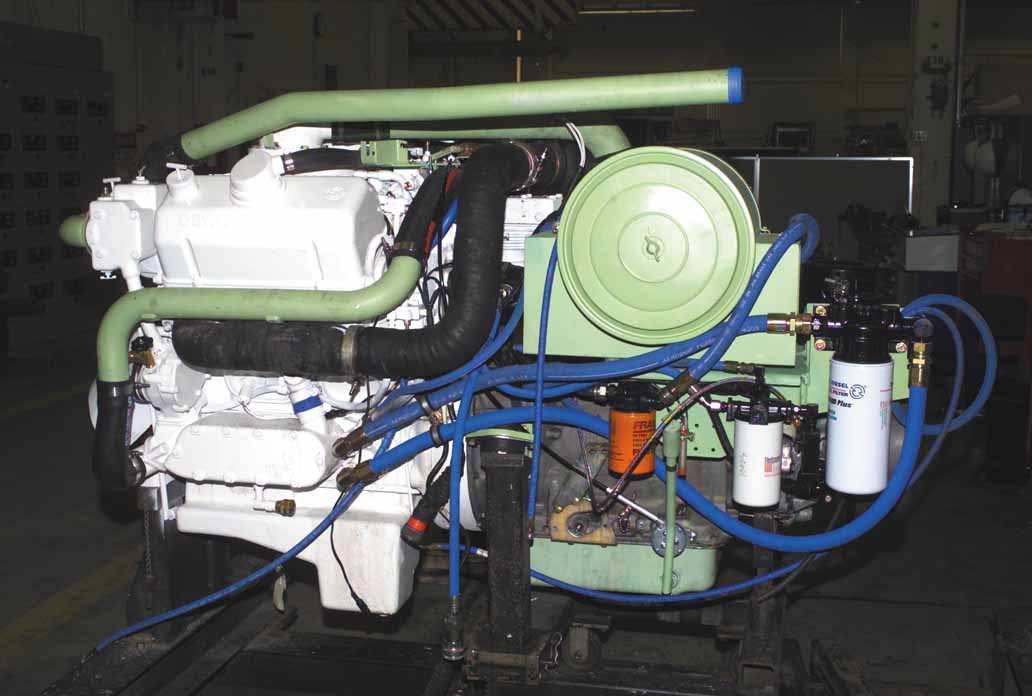
The LAV-25's power plant

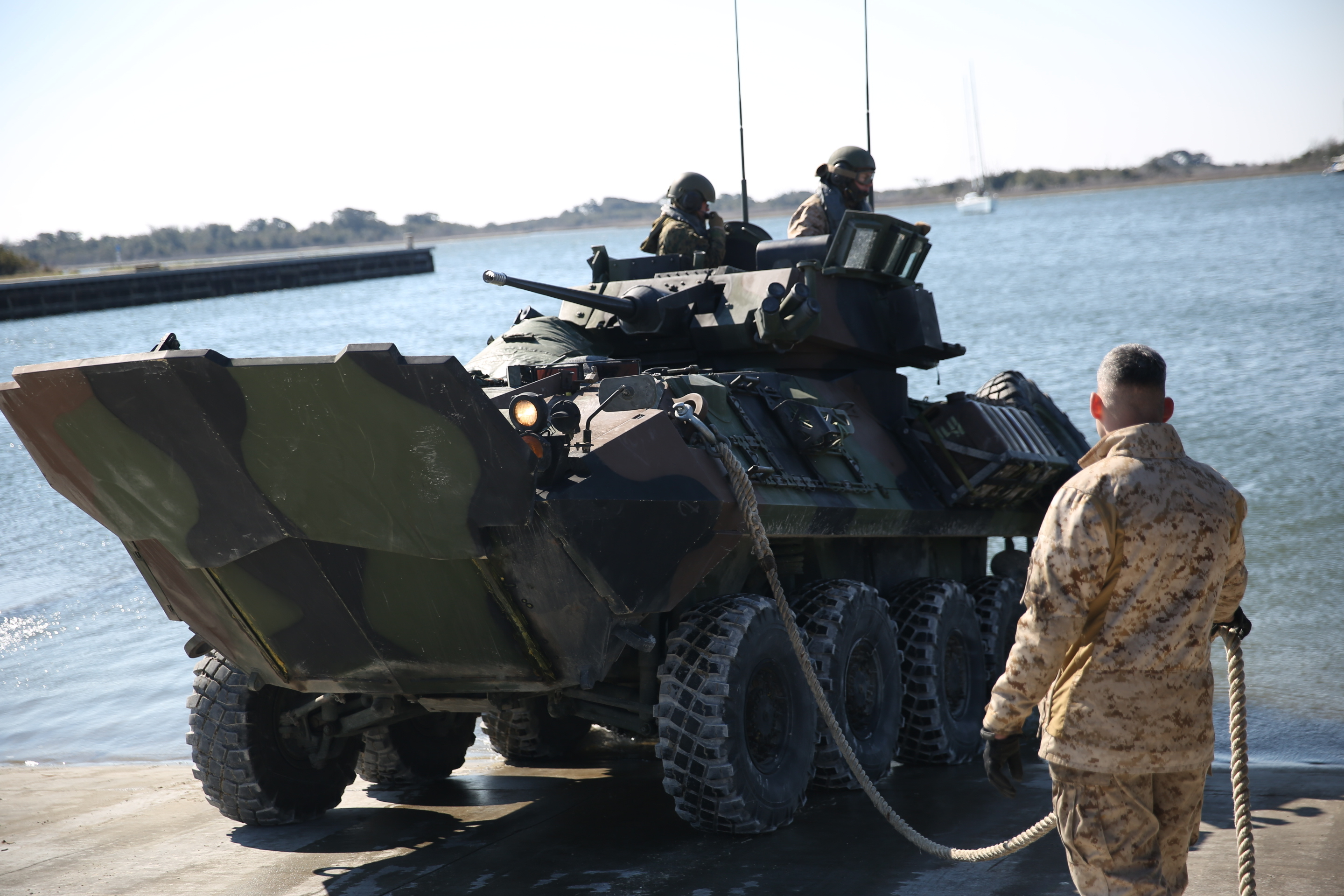
An LAV-25 conducts swim test at Marine Corps Base Camp Lejeune

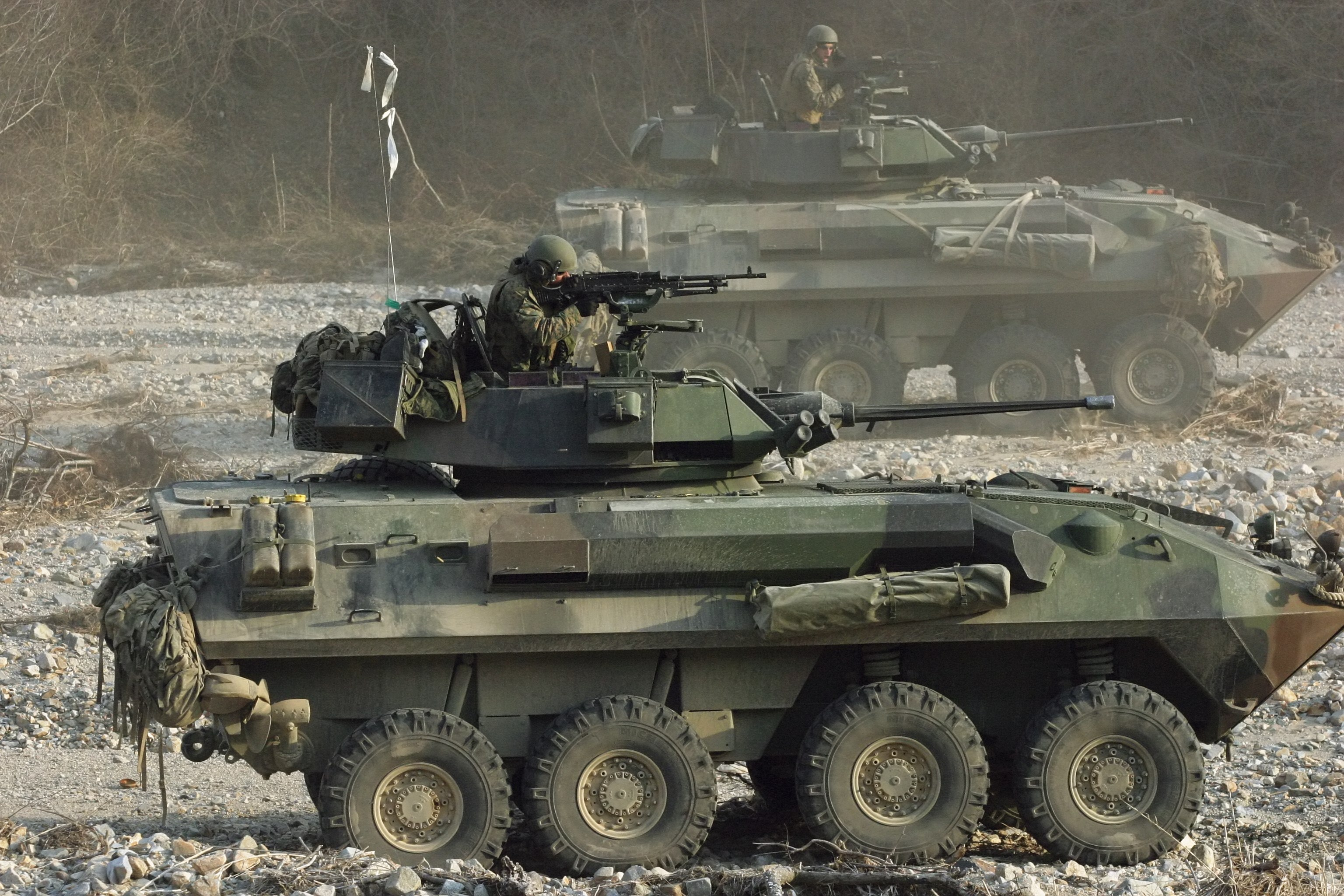
SLEP mods to a LAV-25 show new thermal shrouding over the exhaust

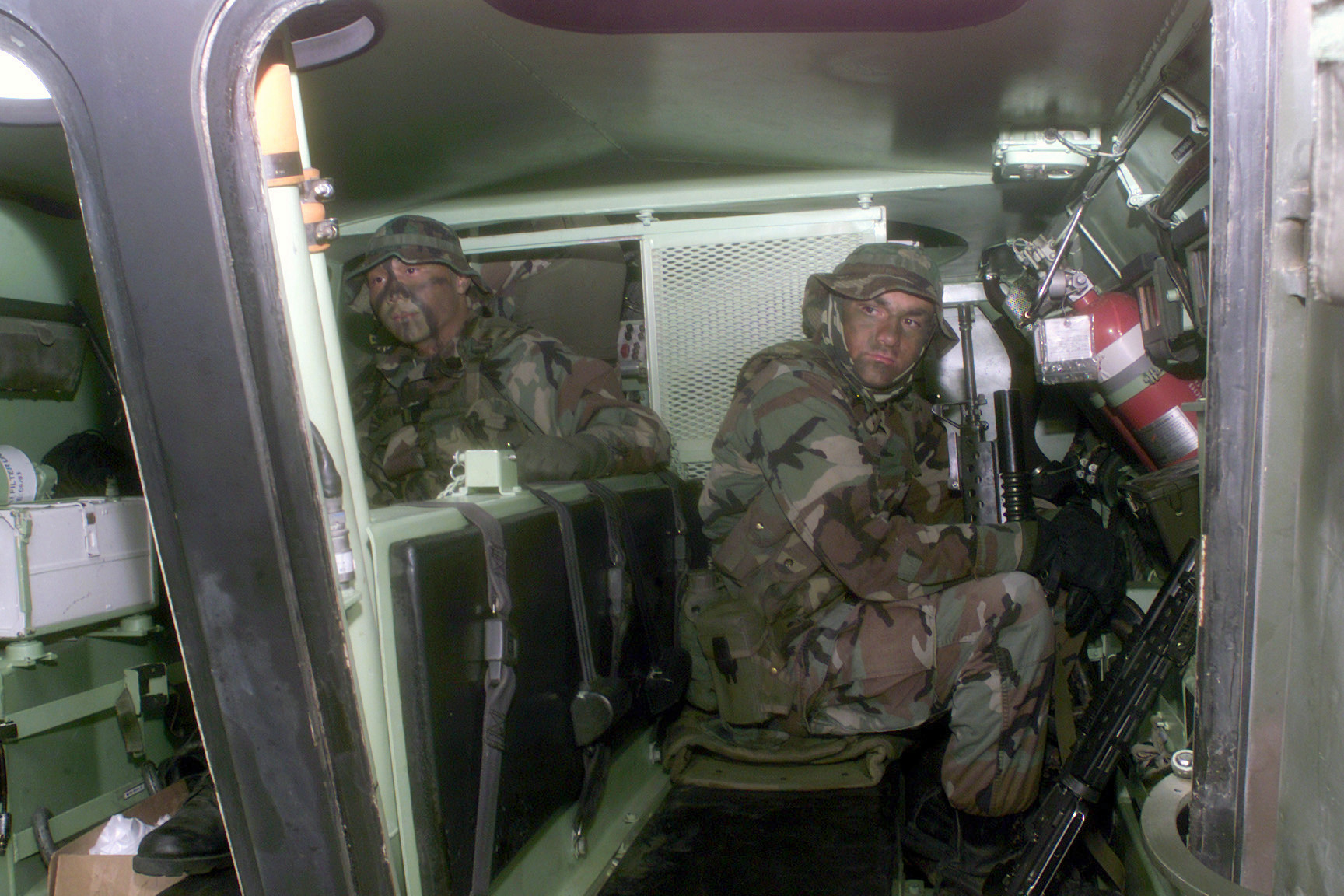
The LAV-25's rear passenger compartment

=== Armor ===
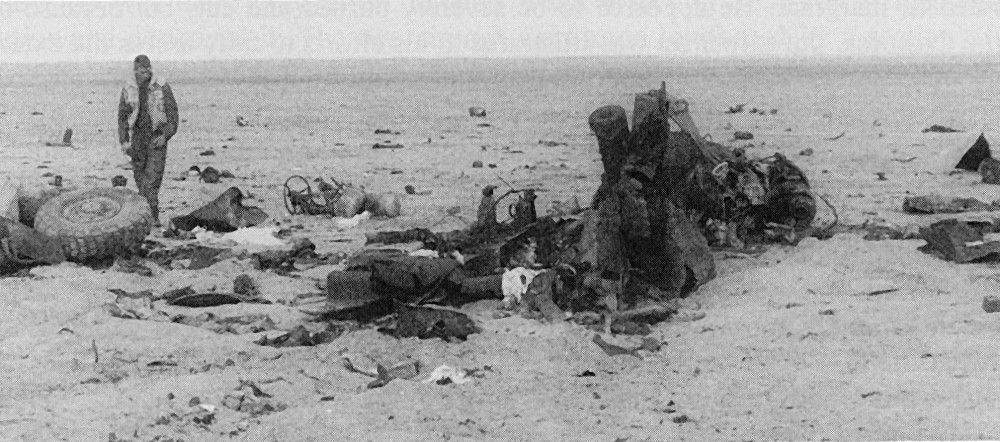
A destroyed LAV-25 from friendly fire during the 1991 Gulf War.

The LAV-25 is a lightly armored vehicle. The base model is protected by light gauge high hardness steel armor (MIL-A-46100), varying in nominal thickness from 4.71 mm to 9.71 mm. This level of high-hardness steel armor is intended only to offer protection against small arms rounds such as the common 7.62x39mm M1943 ball used by Kalashnikov rifles such as the AKM, to achieve the lowest possible weight and cost.

== Variants ==
=== LAV-25 ===
The standard LAV is fitted with a turret with 360° traverse, armed with an M242 25 mm chain gun with 420 rounds of 25 mm ammunition, both M791 APDS-T (Armour Piercing Discarding Sabot-Tracer) and M792 HEI-T (High Explosive Incendiary-Tracer), of which half is ready for use. 150 rounds are ready for use from one stowage bin, 60 from another stowage bin, the other 210 rounds are stowed elsewhere in the vehicle. A coaxial M240C machine gun is mounted alongside the M242, and a pintle-mounted M240B/G machine gun, with 1,320 rounds of 7.62 mm ammunition, is mounted on the turret roof. The Canadian Army uses an upgraded version of this chassis for its Coyote Armoured Reconnaissance Vehicle.

=== LAV-25A1 ===
The vehicle has been through many changes through the late 1990s. The new modification or SLEP has changed the LAV-25 to the LAV-25A1 standard and has been completely fielded.

=== LAV-25A2 ===
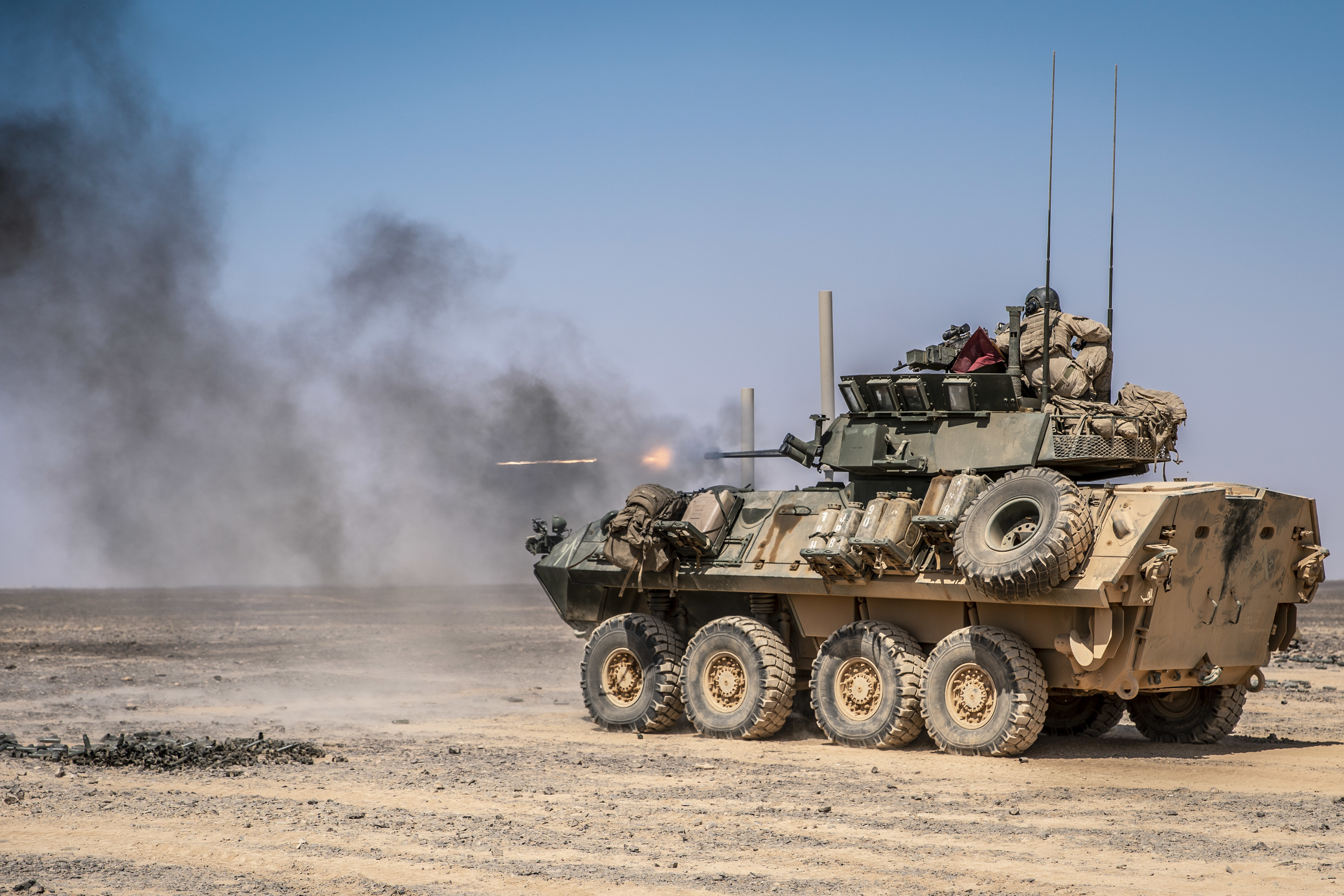
LAV-25A2 firing its 25 mm M242 Bushmaster

Funding has been approved for continued upgrades to the LAV family to bring them up to the LAV-A2 standard. Phase I improvements include increased external and internal ballistic armor upgrades, improved fire suppression equipment, and upgrading the vehicle's suspension to the Generation II standard. Phase II upgrades include replacing the turret hydraulics with an electric drive system and replacing the thermal sight with an improved model incorporating a laser range finder for aircraft.

To reflect the improved significant survivability and capability enhancements occurring today, the LAV is being renamed as the LAV-A2. The LAV-A2 project involved developing and installing an internal and external ballistic protection upgrade package, developed by Armatec Survivability, for the Light Armored Vehicles, an automatic fire suppression system for the interior of the vehicle and a Generation II suspension upgrade to support the added weight of the new armor. The suspension upgrade includes new struts/steering knuckles, torsion bars, shocks and mounts and driveshaft. The three-kit armor system provides the LAV with additional survivability against improvised explosive devices (IED) and direct-fire kinetic energy weapons.

LAV-25A2 firing 25 mm HEI-T

The LAV-25A2 includes the Improved Thermal Sight System (ITSS) developed by Raytheon. The ITSS provides the gunner and commander with thermal images, an eye-safe laser range finder, a fire-control solution and far-target location target grid information.

The new armor will provide protection from 14.5 mm armor-piercing rounds, and include an anti-spall lining on the inside to further protect crew members. It will be similar to the protection found on the U.S. Army's LAV III "Stryker" variant.

Tests by the U.S. Army's Operational Test Command (OTC), Airborne and Special Operations Test Directorate at Fort Bragg demonstrated that the LAV-25A2 could be airdropped from transport aircraft, a capability of interest to Army airborne units. In October 2018, Alpha Company, 4th Battalion, 68th Armor Regiment, 1st Brigade Combat Team of the 82nd Airborne Division was activated and equipped with ex-USMC LAV-25A2s for test and evaluation; the unit was deactivated in September 2020 differing to wait for the creation of the U.S. Army's Mobile Protected Firepower units planned for 2025/2026.

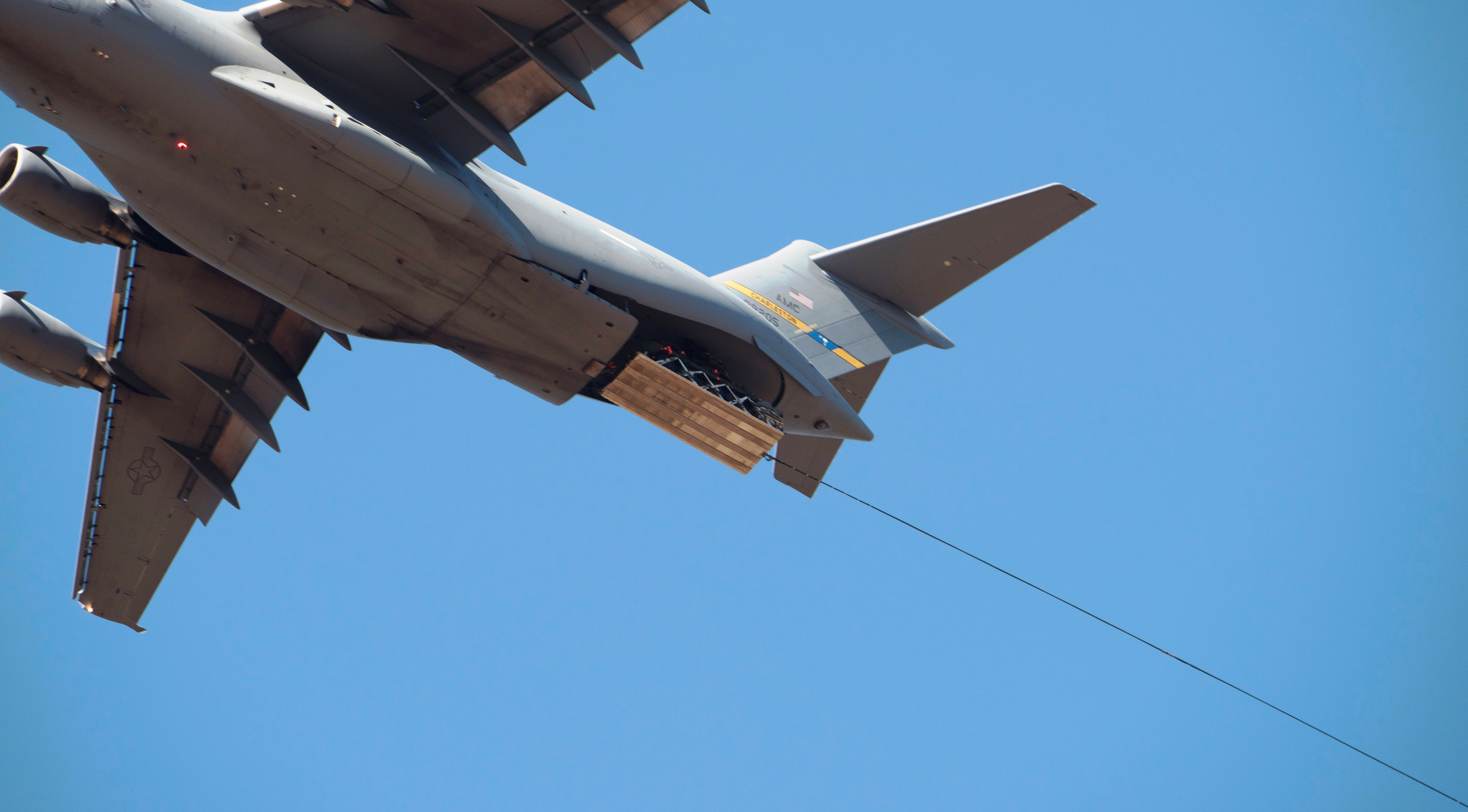
A C-17 airdropping an LAV-25A2

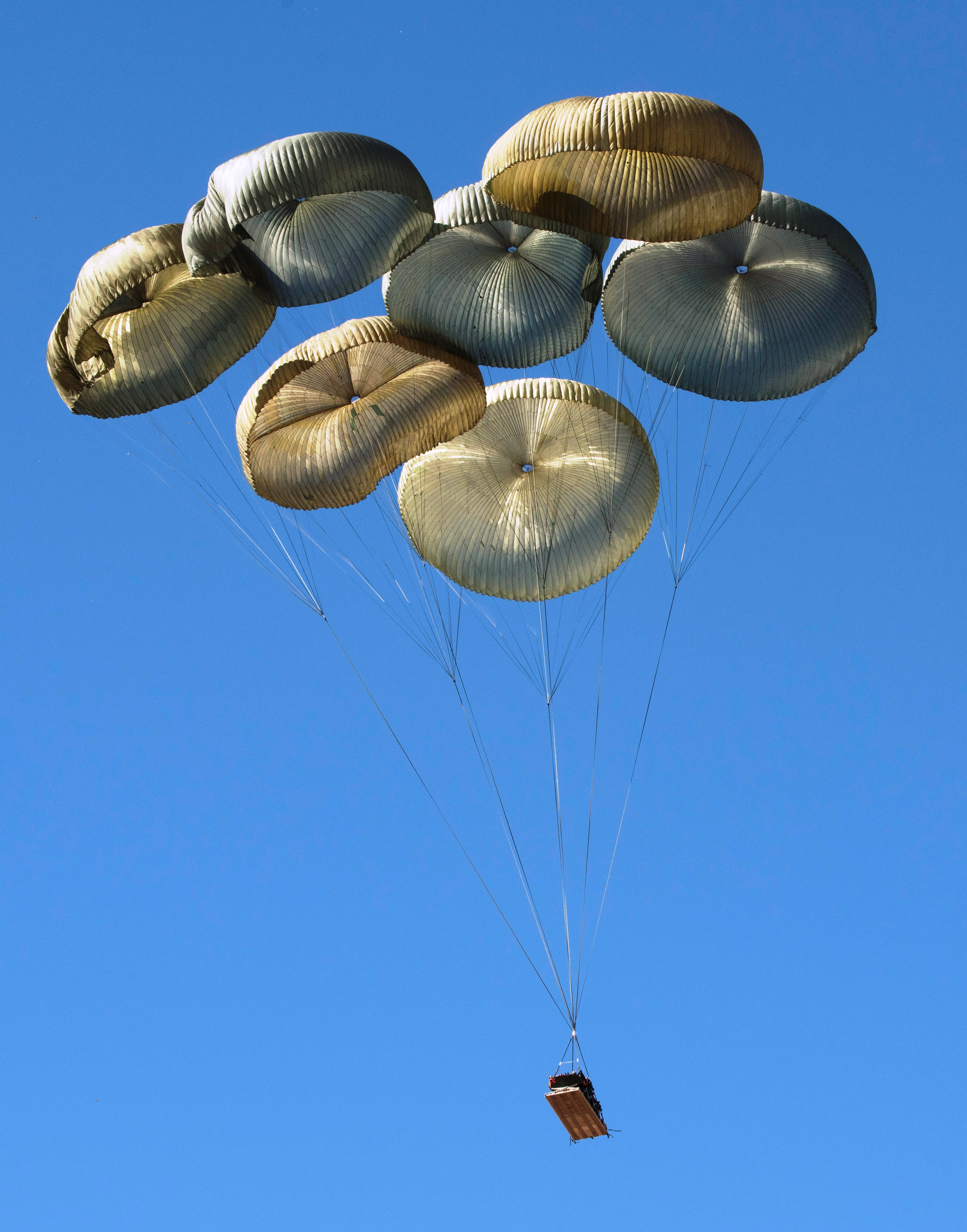
An LAV-25A2 being airdropped

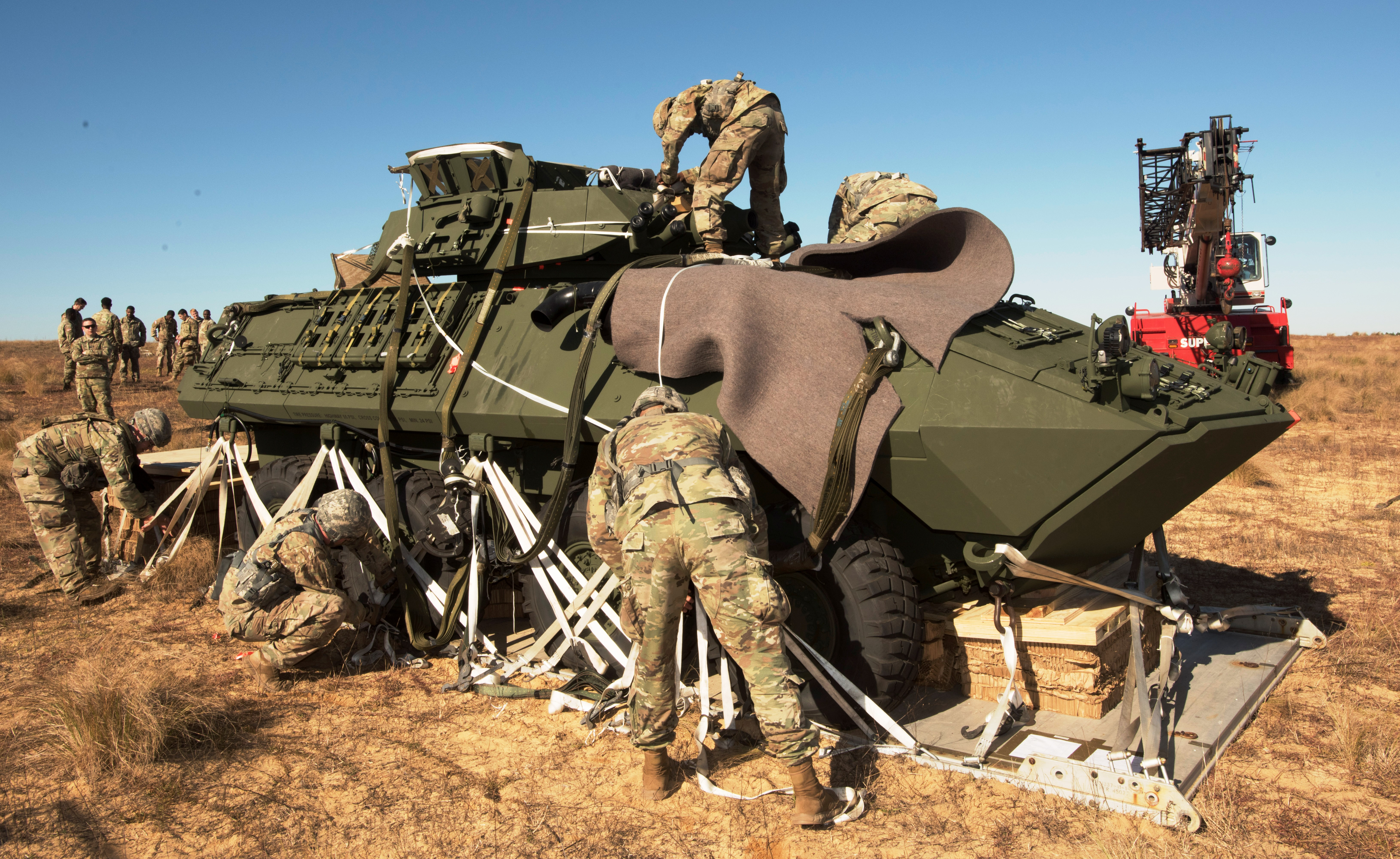
Recovery of an airdropped LAV-25A2

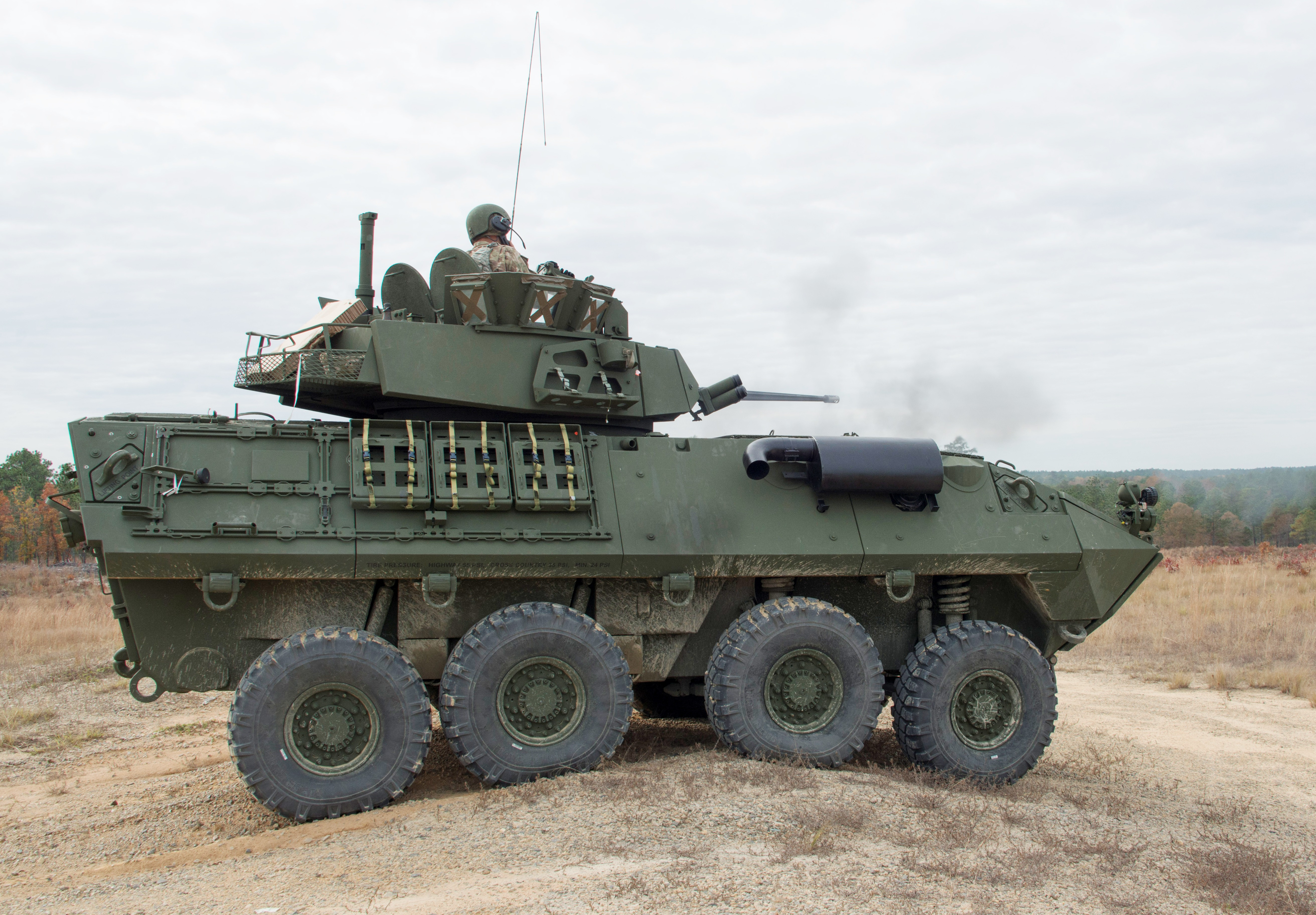
Rapid setup and test fire of the LAV-25A2 after an airdrop

=== LAV-25A3 ===
In January 2019, General Dynamics was awarded a $37.2 million contract to upgrade the Marine Corps' LAV fleet. Designated the LAV A3, upgrades include improvements to the powerpack to improve reliability, cooling capacity, diagnostics, and fuel economy, a new drivetrain for improved towing capability, a steering dampener to improve road feel and usability, and a digitized drivers' instrument panel. The initial contract was for 60 hardware kits which are planned for installation by 2021.

=== Other Variants ===
Five variants of the LAV-25 were originally envisioned. Only six were initially production ready. Other than the LAV-25, these were:

- LAV-AT (Anti-Tank)

LAV fitted with an Emerson 901A1 TOW-2 anti-tank guided missile launcher, the same turret that was fitted on the M901 ITV. It is also armed with a pintle-mounted M240E1 or M240B general-purpose machine gun. It carries a total of 16 TOW missiles and 1,000 rounds of 7.62 mm ammunition.

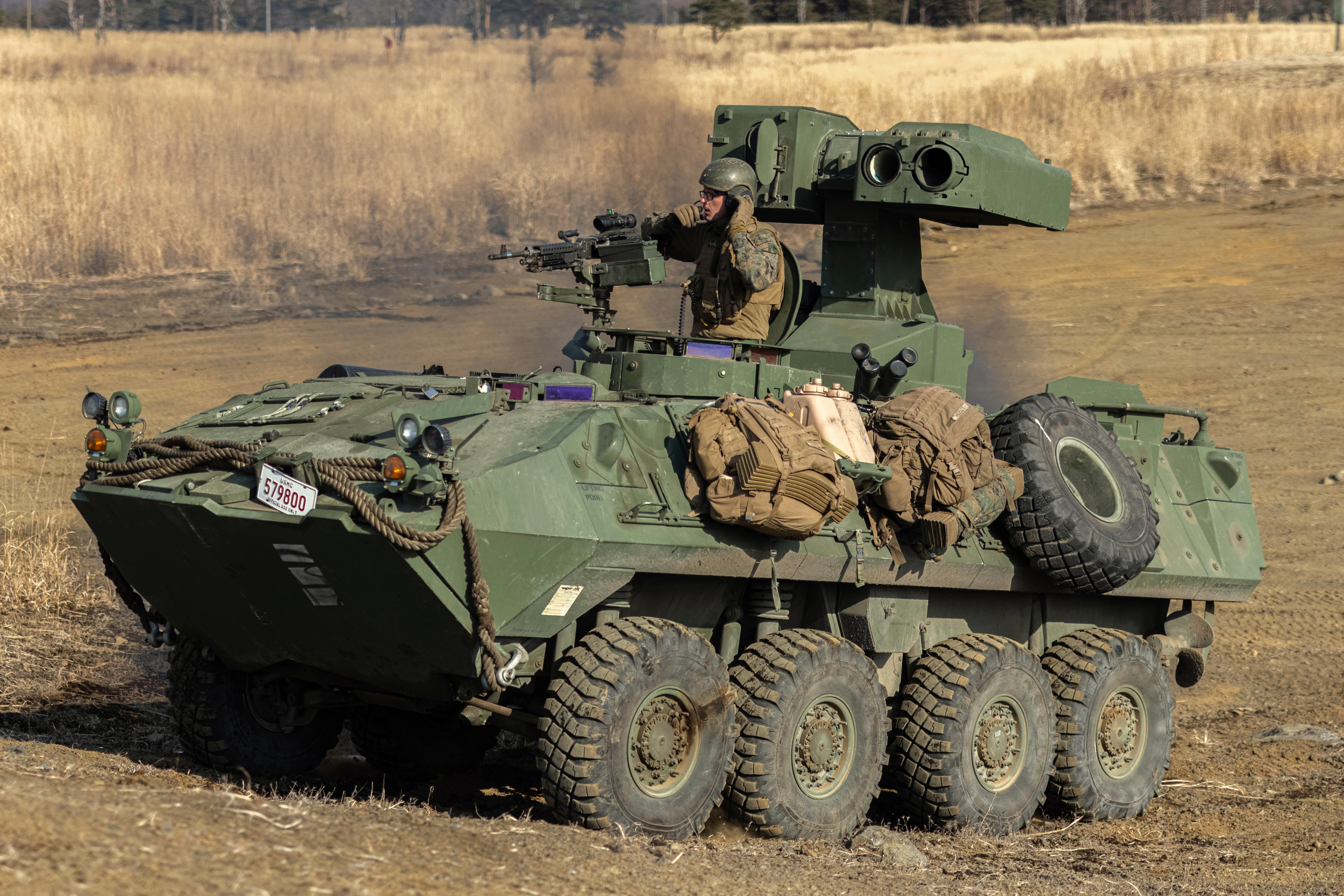
LAV-ATM

- LAV-ATM (Modernization) replaces the Emerson turret with the modified target acquisition system turret. Improvements include always being in the up position to scan and track while moving and a more reliable digital design. The turret is also unmanned, can fire both wire-guided and radio frequency TOW missiles, has an improved thermal sight, far target location system, new commander/gunner video sight displays, and an electric elevation and azimuth drive system to rotate the system onto target. The LAV-ATM delivers accurate and destructive fire from defilade positions against tanks and armored vehicles. It carries a crew of four (driver, commander, gunner, and loader). Each LAV-ATM can carry two missiles ready to fire and has 14 missiles stowed, for a total of 16. Each LAR company has four LAV-ATMs.

- LAV-M (Mortar)

LAV fitted with opening doors on the top, inside it is fitted with an 81 mm M252 mortar, with 360° traverse, and a pintle-mounted M240E1 machine gun. It carries 90 81 mm mortar shells, and 1,000 rounds of 7.62 mm ammunition. It carries a crew of five (driver, commander, gunner, loader, and ammo handler). Each LAR company has two LAV-Ms.
In June 2021, the Marine Corps selected the UVision Hero-120 loitering munition to be integrated onto the LAV-M, as well as other platforms, under the Organic Precision Fire Mounted (OPF-M) effort to enable them to employ a mid-range, anti-armor weapon system. The multi-canister launcher (MCL) mounted on the LAV-M can hold eight munitions.

- LAV-R (Recovery)

LAV fitted with a boom crane, and recovery winch, for use in recovery of vehicles, specifically other LAVs. the LAV-R also has an air compressor for pneumatic tools, a filter/transfer pump, floodlights, and additional stowage capabilities. It serves as the primary maintenance vehicle and is used to recover/tow dead lined LAVs, as well as to perform organizational and limited intermediate field level maintenance. The LAV-R has a 6,600 lb-rated extendable rotating boom and a 30,000 lb-rated rearward winch. The LAV-R provides repair and recovery services at the organizational and intermediate field maintenance levels. It is armed with a pintle-mounted M240E1/G machine gun, and carries 1,000 rounds of 7.62 mm ammunition. It has a crew of three (driver, commander, and rigger). Each LAR company has one LAV-R, except for H&S company, which has 3 to support the battalion.

- LAV-C2 (Command & Control)

LAV with a raised roof to accommodate several VHF, UHF and HF radios. It is armed with a pintle-mounted M240E1/G machine gun, and carries 1,000 rounds of 7.62 mm ammunition. The vehicle carries a suite of radios, a portable shelter, and an auxiliary power unit (also referred to as APU) to substitute for vehicle power when needed. The LAV-C2A2 has the capability to effectively command and control the battalion, company, or combat team. Each LAR company has two LAV-C2s, except for H&S company, which has 6 to support the battalion. Generally referred to as the C^{2} ("C-square" or "C-two").

- LAV-L (Logistics)

LAV variant that provides transportation for personnel, communications equipment, limited CASEVAC (2 litters), ammunition, fuel, and other supplies. It is armed with a pintle-mounted machine gun, 7.62 mm, M240B and has a cargo capacity of 5,600 lb (2,500 kg). It carries a crew of three (driver, commander, and logistics crewmember). Each LAR company has four LAV-Ls, except for H&S company, which has 6 to support the battalion

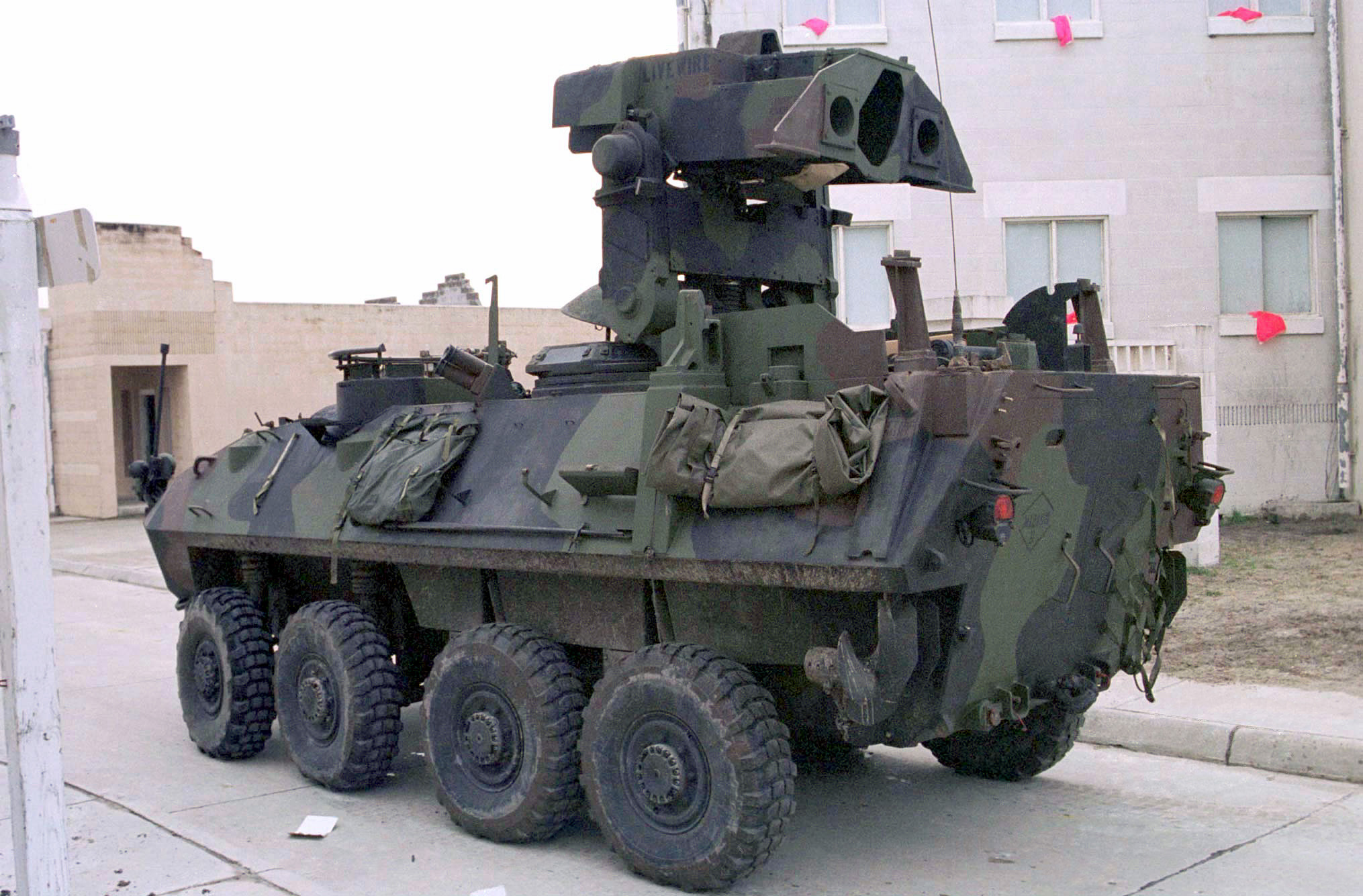
LAV-AT with the 901A1 TOW-2 in 1997

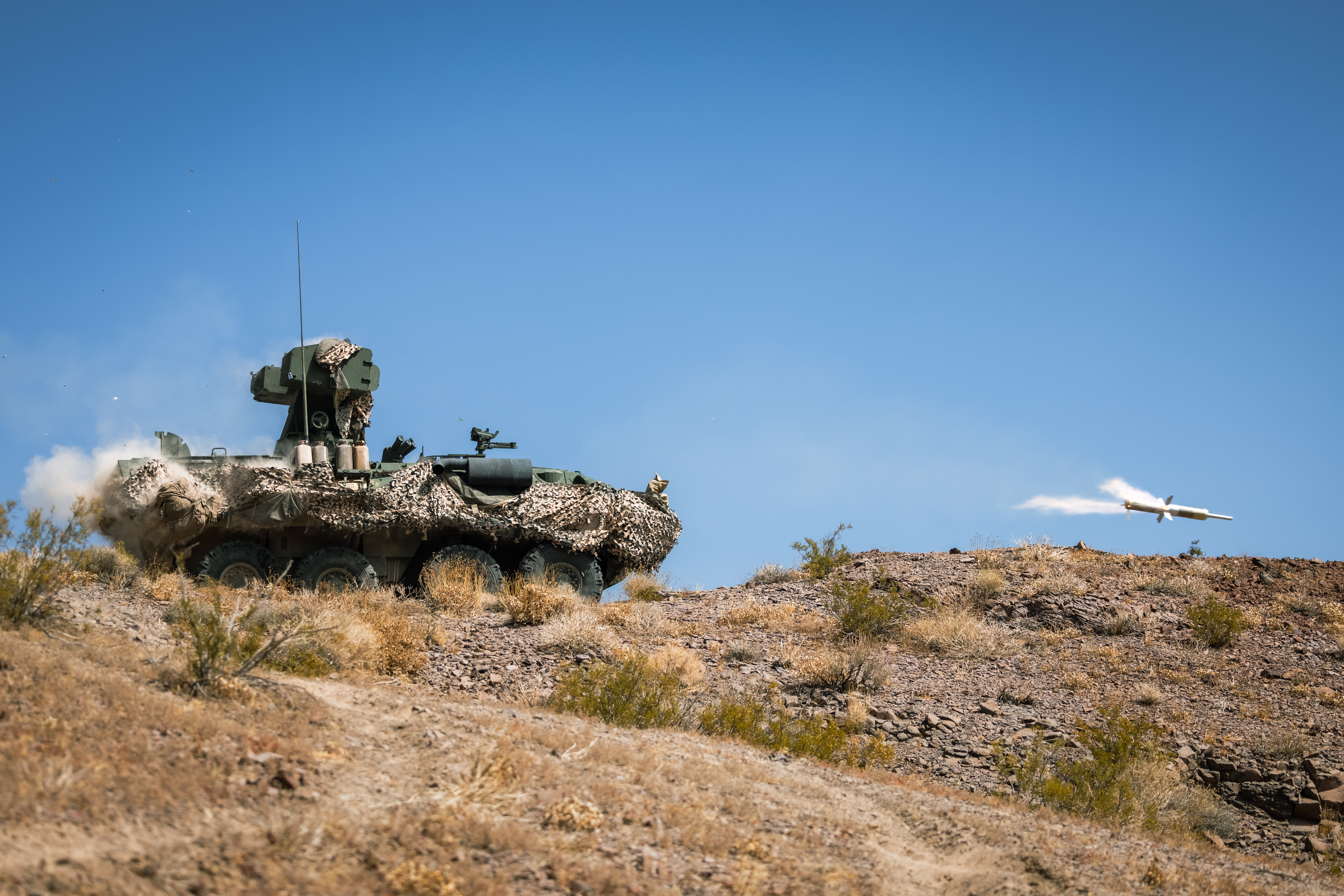
LAV-ATM firing TOW missile

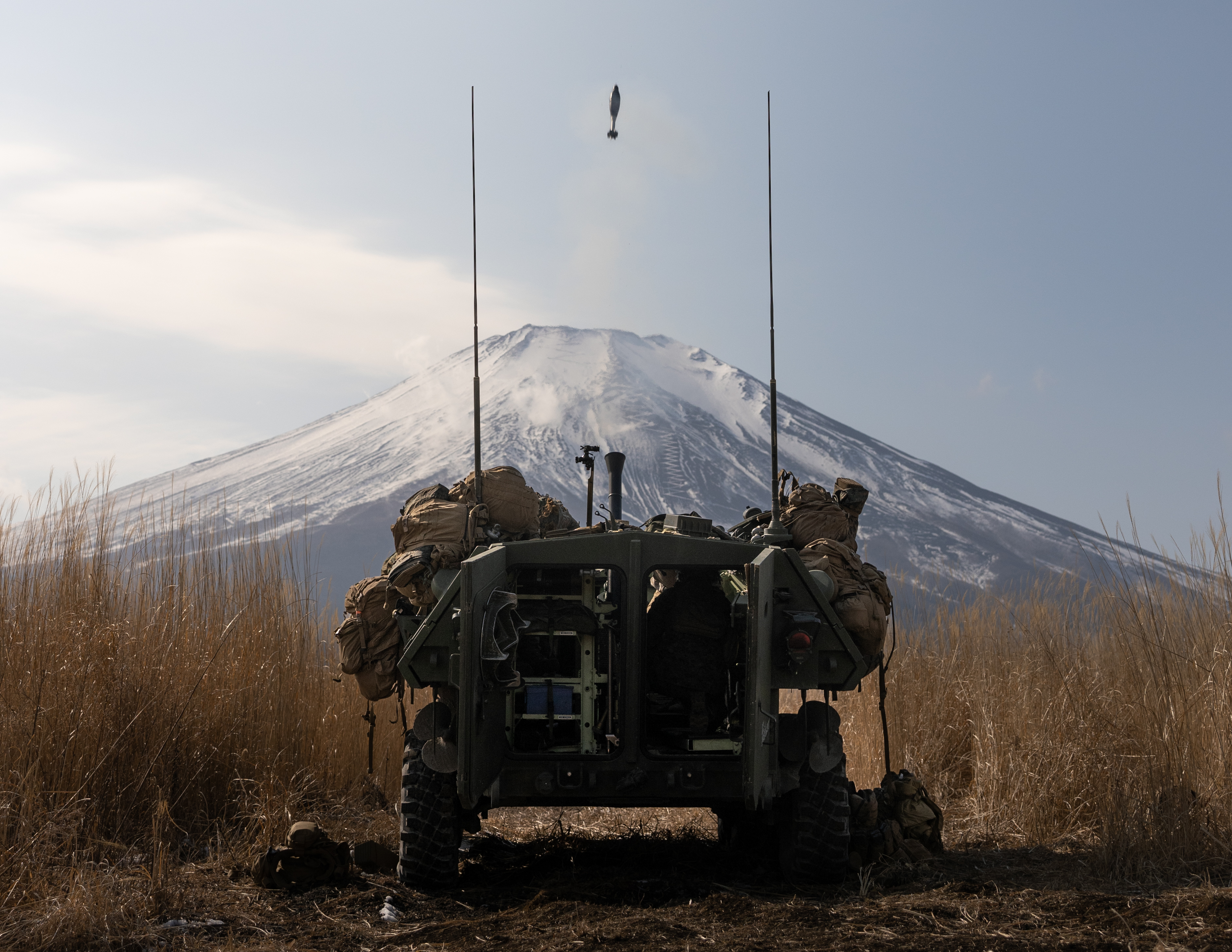
LAV-M

Development continued with two other variants:

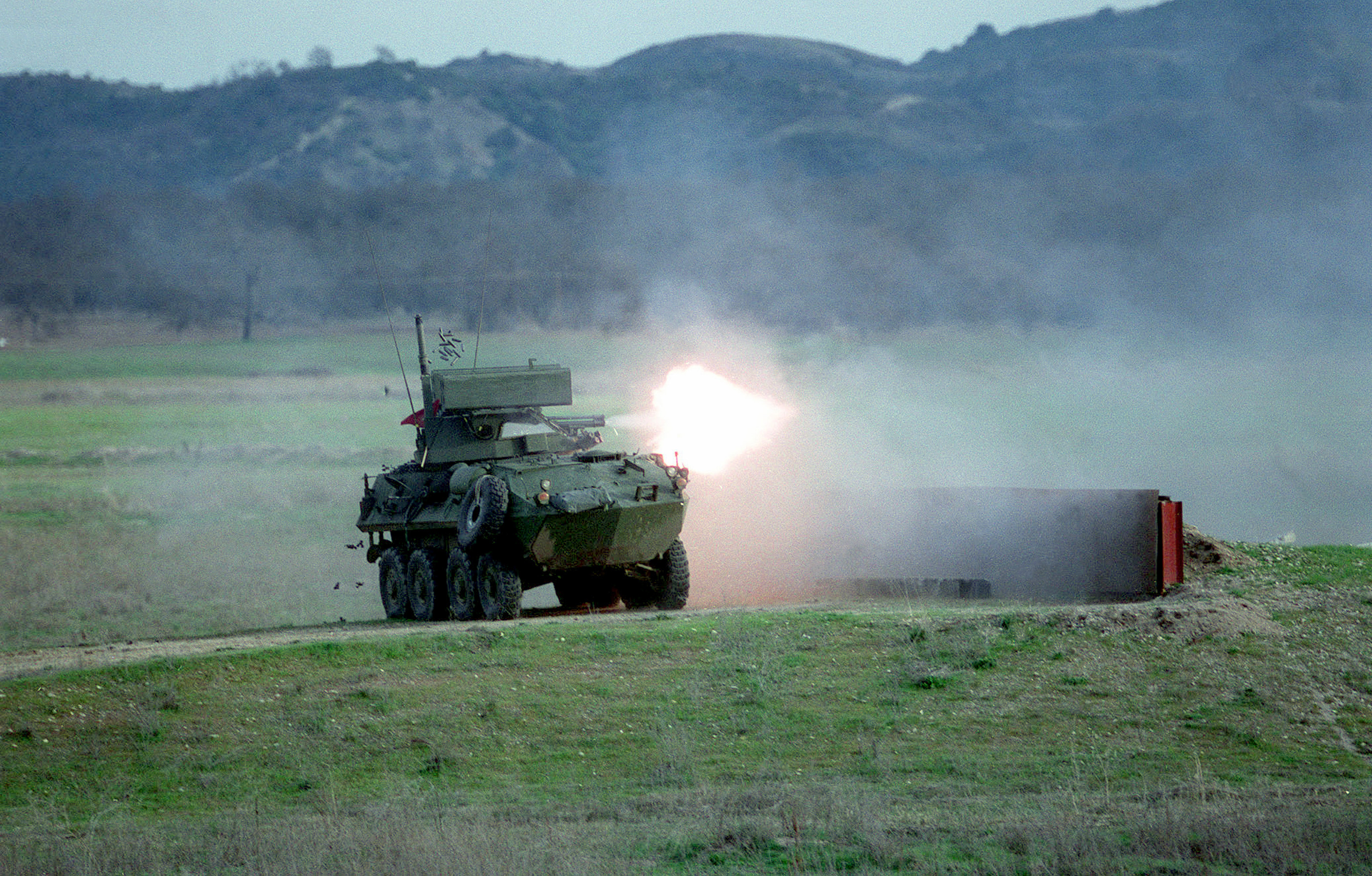
A LAV-AD during live-fire exercise in 1999.

- LAV-AD (Air Defense)

LAV fitted with an electric turret mounting a General Dynamics GAU-12 Equalizer 25 mm (0.984 in) 5-barreled Gatling cannon, and two missile pods each with 4 FIM-92 Stinger missiles for short range air defense duties. Manned by a crew of 3 and with a capacity for 990 rounds of 25 mm ammunition, and 16 (including 8 reload rounds) FIM-92 Stinger missiles. A variant using the Mistral missile in place of Stingers was developed for the export market. The LAV-AD can also mount a pod of 70mm Hydra-70 rockets, replacing the one Stinger pod mounted above the GAU-12, to counter attack helicopters operating beyond the Stinger’s range, but their effectiveness against moving targets was debated. Originally intended as a near-term solution, the Hydra-70’s ability to reliably hit standoff threats was controversial.

- LAV-AG (Assault Gun) In 1987, General Motors tested an EX35 105 mm gun on a LAV chassis. In June 1990, the Marine Corps awarded Cadillac Gage Textron a contract to provide three LAVs, designated the LAV-105, with the EX35 gun. This project was canceled in 1991 due to a lack of funds. However, funding was restored by Congress under the stipulation that the Army and Marine Corps integrate the turret and gun of the LAV-105 with the Armored Gun System chassis. Amid concerns about the potential mismatch between the two components, Congress later nixed this requirement. The Marine Corps revived the LAV-105 in 1993. None were ultimately ordered, though the vehicle did perform well during testing.

Other variants:

- LAV-MEWSS (Mobile Electronic Warfare Support System)

LAV modified to intercept, collect, and disrupt enemy communications via a vast array of electronic warfare equipment. Each LAR battalion has four LAV-MEWSS vehicles.

- LAV-EFSS (Expeditionary Fire Support System)

Proposed replacement for LAV-M, LAV fitted with provisions to use Dragon Fire, a 120 mm recoil mortar system.

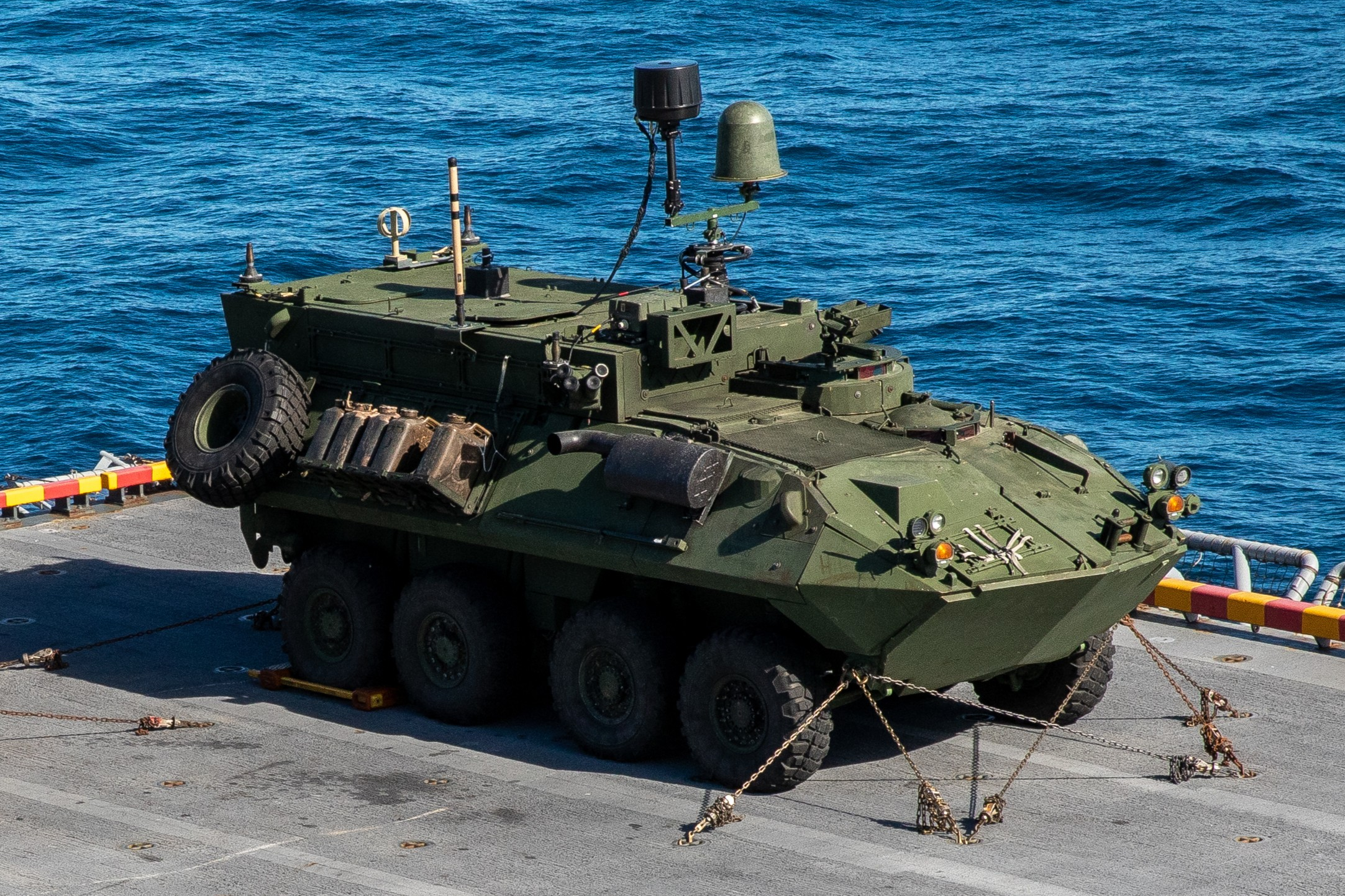
LAV-MEWSS

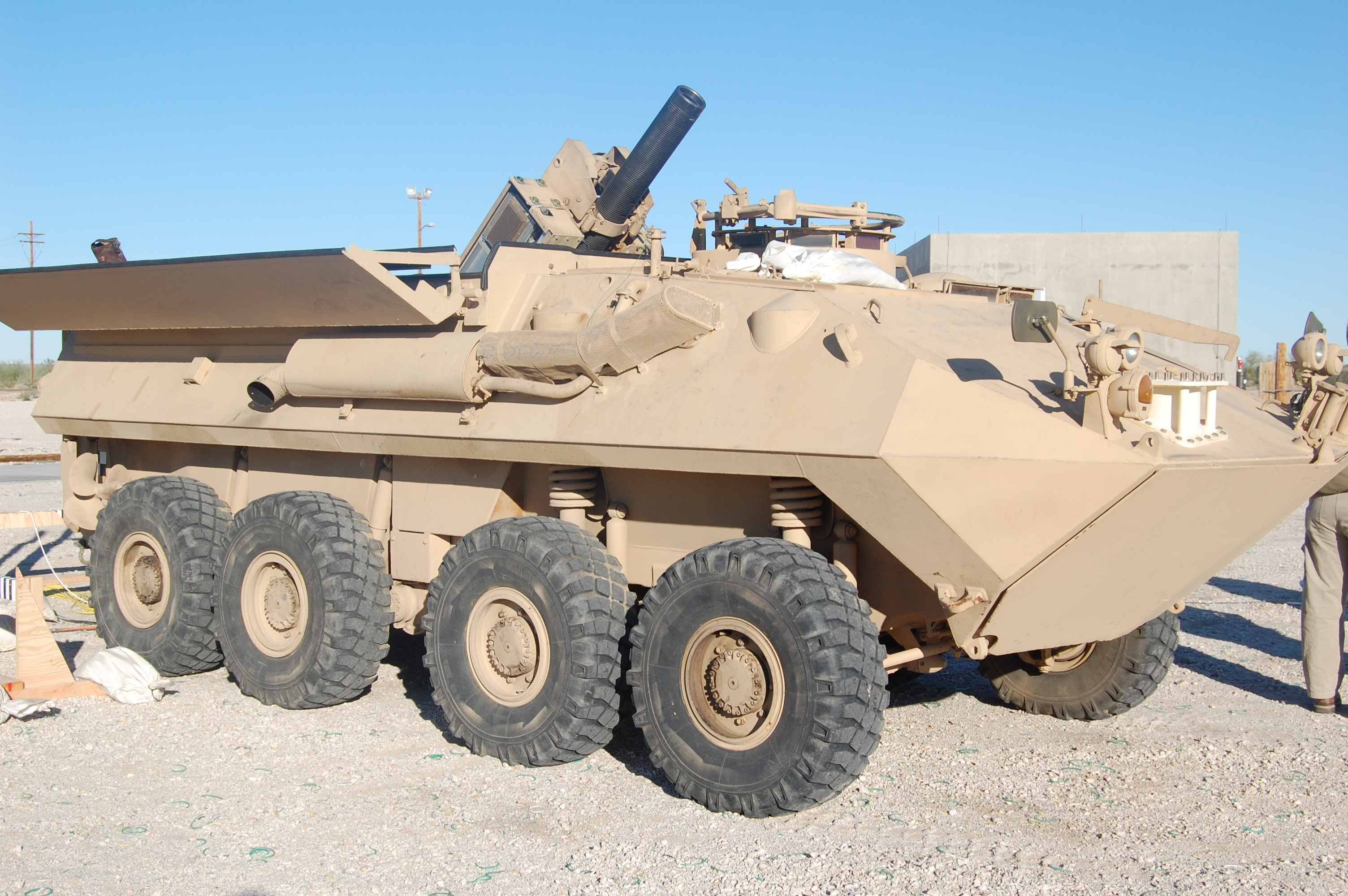
LAV-EFSS

An unknown variant is used by at least one civilian law enforcement agency.

== Operators ==
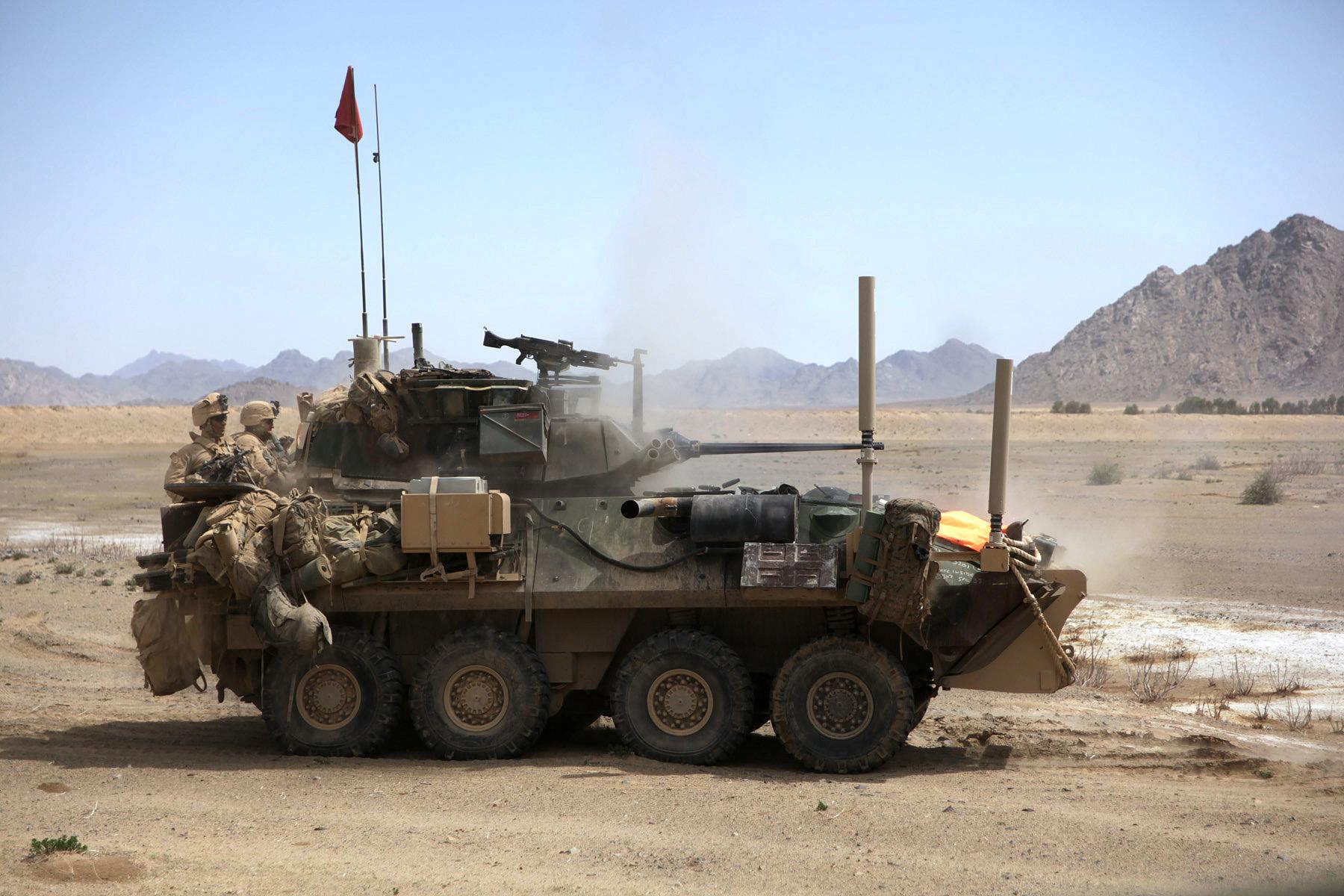
A U.S. Marine Corps LAV-25A2 engaging insurgents in Helmand Province, Afghanistan, in 2011.

Saudi Arabia

- Saudi Arabian National Guard

United States

- United States Army used by 82nd Airborne Division
  - Estimated 14 LAV-25 as of January 2025
- United States Marine Corps

Kuwait

- Kuwait National Guard

== See also ==
- United States Marine Corps Light Armored Reconnaissance – Battalion units
- TATA Kestrel – (India)
- Mowag Piranha – (Switzerland)
- Patria AMV – (Finland)
- ASLAV – (Australia)
- BTR-90 – (Russia)
- CM-32 armoured vehicle – (Taiwan)
- FNSS Pars – (Turkey)
- LAV III – (Canada)
- NZLAV – (Canada)
- KTO Rosomak – (Poland)
- Stryker – (United States, Canada)
- VBCI – (France)
- Coyote reconnaissance vehicle – (Canada)
- BTR-3 – (Ukraine)
- Pandur I – (Austria)
