= United States Marine Corps Light Armored Reconnaissance =

Battalion units

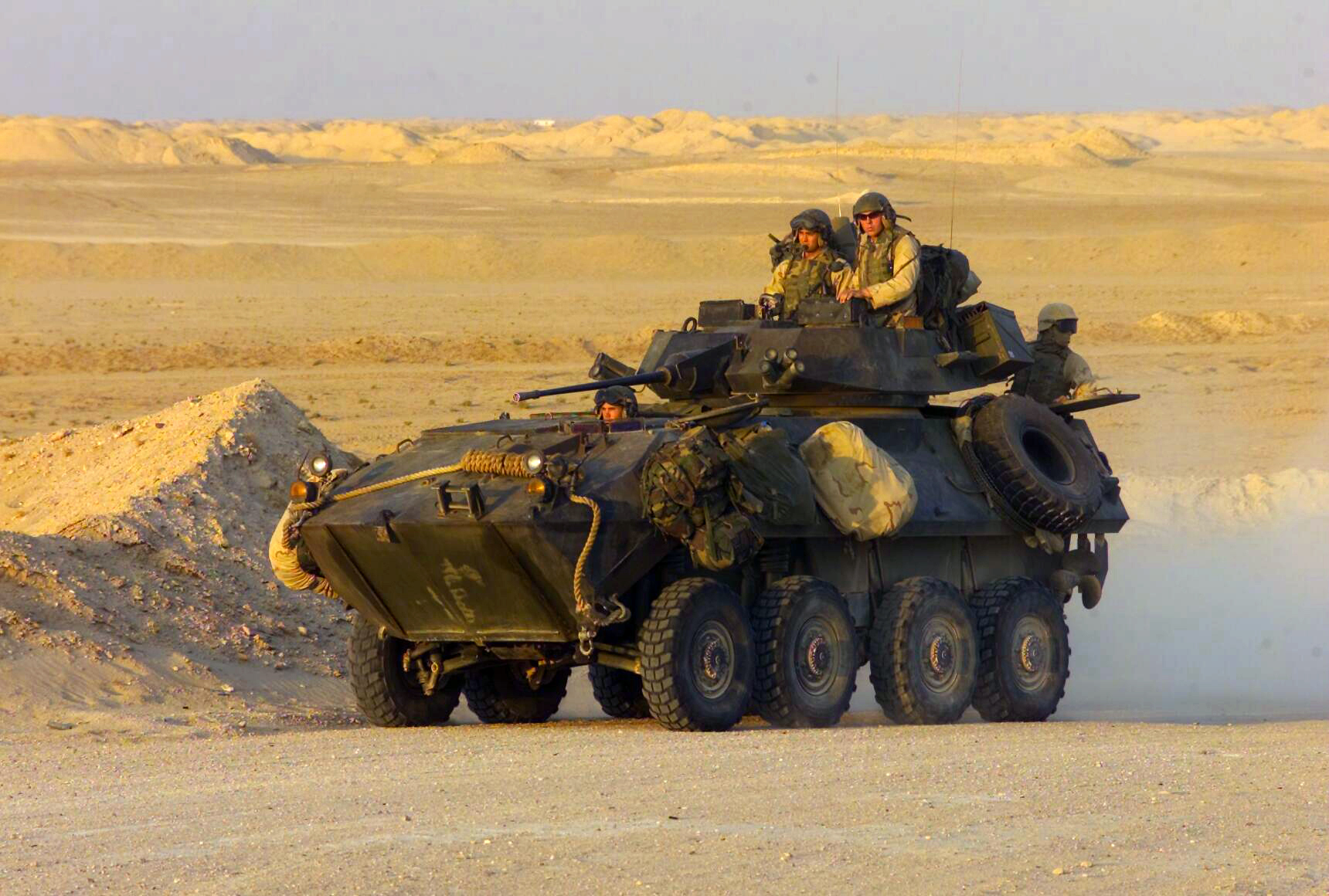
LAV 25 conducting recon in Iraq.

The United States Marine Corps Light Armored Reconnaissance Battalions, or LAR Battalions, are fast and mobilized armored terrestrial reconnaissance units that conduct reconnaissance-in-force (RIF) ahead of the battalion landing teams or division infantry forces. They mainly provide the Marine Air-Ground Task Force and the Marine Expeditionary Unit commanders vital intelligence of the enemy.

They perform their methods as special motorized, infantry-based reconnaissance units as they are equipped with LAV-25s to quickly penetrate enemy lines and locate and/or harass any enemy forces to determine their size, strengths, location, and any other pertinent information requested of the Marine commanders.

== Mission ==
“The LAR [Light Armored Reconnaissance] battalion performs combined arms reconnaissance and security missions in support of the GCE [Ground Combat Element]. Its mission is to conduct reconnaissance, security and economy of force operations, and, within its capabilities, limited offensive or defensive operations that exploit the unit’s mobility and firepower.” (Marine Corps Warfighting Publication MCWP 3-14, page 1-1)

LAR is not mechanized infantry. MCWP 3-14 states (page 2-1): “The LAR scouts are not employed the same way as infantry or mechanized infantry.” Again, MCWP 3-14 goes on to emphasize this distinction (page 2-4): “Operations requiring large numbers of infantry favor employing mechanized infantry units due to their higher troop density.” In addition to the requisite lack of “troop density” for traditional infantry tasks, the LAR is not equipped with either an armored personnel carrier or an infantry fighting vehicle, which a designation as either armored or mechanized infantry would require. MCWP 3-14 makes this clear (page 2-4): “The LAV should not be viewed as an infantry fighting vehicle or as an armored personnel carrier. This vehicle is an armored reconnaissance vehicle that lacks sufficient armor protection and troop density to perform missions normally assigned to a mechanized infantry unit.”

== History ==
The LAR Battalions were formed from the remnants of the Scout (Tank) companies in Marine tank battalions that existed during World War II. The early tank scouts would reconnoiter ahead of enemy forces and conduct reconnaissance-in-force while riding on top of the tanks. They became reliable as they were able to be projected into enemy territory, harass the enemy, and withdraw back to friendly lines, reporting their newfound intelligence. By the time World War II ended, the scout companies formed into scout and snipers platoons and Division Reconnaissance companies.

In the early 1980s, the Light Armored Battalions were created to fill in the necessary assets to the infantry regiments. Prior to the formation of LAR Battalions assigned to the Fleet Marine Force (FMF), there was one combat-ready LAV-25 equipped unit within the Marine Corps. In 1983, the First Light Armored Vehicle Battalion (1stLAVB), was created at Marine Corps Air and Ground Combat Center (MCAGCC) Twentynine Palms, California.

LAR Battalions are tasked with screening for Regimental Combat Teams (RCT) or Battalion Landing Teams (BLT) and are not to get decisively engaged. However, during OIF many elements of 1st, 2nd, and 3rd LAR Battalions were the lead element in the push to Baghdad (see also Task Force Tripoli).

== List of battalions ==
| Battalion Name | Insignia | Nickname | Location |
|---|---|---|---|
| 1st Light Armored Reconnaissance Battalion | | Highlanders | Marine Corps Base Camp Pendleton, California |
| 2nd Light Armored Reconnaissance Battalion | | Destroyers | Marine Corps Base Camp Lejeune, North Carolina |
| 3rd Light Armored Reconnaissance Battalion | | Wolfpack | Marine Corps Air Ground Combat Center Twentynine Palms, California |
| 4th Light Armored Reconnaissance Battalion (Reserve) | | Iron Horse Marines | Marine Corps Base Camp Pendleton, California |

== See also ==
- List of United States Marine Corps battalions
