= Force Design 2030 =

U.S. Marines restructuring plan

Force Design 2030, also known as FD2030, is an ongoing force restructuring plan by the United States Marine Corps to reshape its combat power for future near-peer adversary conflicts that was introduced in March 2020 by the Commandant of the Marine Corps, General David H. Berger. In October 2023 the program was renamed Force Design, removing the "2030."

According to the Force Design documents, the plan is designed to prepare the Marine Corps for a naval war against China. The plan's key goals are to modernize equipment, to work closer with the United States Navy and become more amphibious, to become more of a light strike force, and to manage personal talents better.

Force Design will see the Marine Corps create a new formation called littoral regiments, consisting of infantry, rocket artillery, logistics, and an anti-air battery, which will be highly mobile and have a long range precision strike capability. The littoral regiments will be equipped with missiles and drones, and can form smaller teams that could be moved quickly from island to island using amphibious ships, to assist the Navy with attacking enemy vessels and keeping sea lanes open. As part of these changes, the plan includes getting rid of all tanks and replacing the majority of cannon artillery with rocket artillery. Structural changes include increasing the number of UAV squadrons, missile artillery batteries, and C-130 transport squadrons, while removing almost all cannon artillery batteries, and all tank and bridging companies. The numbers of other units, including infantry battalions, tilt-rotor aircraft squadrons, and helicopter squadrons, are being slightly reduced.

A group of about thirty retired generals, including all the (living) former Commandants of the Marine Corps, has criticized the plan and tried to lobby against it. Despite this, Force Design is supported by the Department of Defense and members of Congress and the Senate. The main criticisms from the group of retired generals are that Force Design makes the Corps too focused on one theater, is based on new ideas that have not been thoroughly tested, and weakens its overall capability by the removal of tanks and the reduction of cannon artillery. The advocates of Force Design have argued that recent events in the Russo-Ukrainian War and the Red Sea crisis prove the viability of the plan.

== Background ==
Force Design was developed after the 2018 National Defense Strategy stated that the military must be prepared for the competition between the United States and China. In June 2017, then-Commandant Robert Neller told Congress that the Marine Corps was not ready to face a peer-adversary. In July 2019 his successor as the commandant, General David Berger, published the Commandant's Planning Guidance to set out his vision for the Corps, which included making it capable of operating inside of the range of China's weapon systems (such as the first island chain and the South China Sea). One of the key points of the restructuring is to create small units of Marines equipped with missile systems that would be placed on islands in the Western Pacific to assist the Navy with sinking Chinese warships.

== Summary ==
=== Modernize equipment ===
The Marine Corps understands that militaries that do not constantly seek technological advances are disadvantaged. It has sought out new ways to improve technology. For example, it will modify its use of OPFs "Organic Precision Fires", a missile system that ranges in size from a mount on a vehicle to a mortar round carried by a Marine. The Marine Corps is trying out having an OPF multi-canister launcher, basically a medium-range missile launcher, on JLTVs, a more modern version of a Humvee. They are also trying out the same system on ULTVs, a buggy-like 4-wheel caged car. They will be giving each squad, a unit of about 13 Marines, 1-2 OPFs that are manageable by Marines.

The Marine Corps are also utilizing UAV technology. The belief is that drones are the future, and they are equipping each organizational ground unit with drones. The fire team, consisting of 4 Marines, receive a Black Hornet Nano drone. The squad, consisting of 13 Marines, gets a "Skydilla" drone. A platoon, consisting of 43 Marines, will receive a "FSkyRaider PQ-20B Puma". A company, whose size may vary depending on what the job of the company is but will be around 150 Marines, will have a "Stalker Blk 30".

The Marine Corps also equip their Marines with new small arms. A squad of 13 Marines will be given a M3 MAAWS weapon, and a grenade launcher designed for anti-personnel use. Every infantry squad in the US military usually has a squad automatic weapon (SAW). They provide squads with a M27 IAR or, alternatively, the Next Generation Squad Weapon, the XM7 rifle. Marines are often equipped a suppressor for protection against hearing loss and ease of communication with peers. Marines are additionally armed with a sidearm.

=== Become more amphibious ===
The Marine Corps has always worked with the Navy, but with the future threat being China, it needs to be closer to them. The Marine Corps has drifted away from the Navy in recent engagements like the fight against ISIS, but it now needs to work closer and focus more on amphibious warfare. It will need to work with the Navy and the Coast Guard in the event of a war with China.

One way the Corps is going to do this is to institute a new type of regiment called a Littoral Regiment. This regiment will be a naval formation that will be able to conduct fast strike missions. A unit will consist of a combat team, an anti-air battalion, and a logistics battalion. It will debut in Hawaii, and each regiment will have 1,800-2,000 Marines and Sailors.

Another way the Corps will become more amphibious is by using a new type of watercraft called Light Amphibious Warships or LAWs. These crafts will mend the gap between the large, full-scale Navy ships and the small landing crafts that were famous in WWII.

=== Become a strike force ===
The Marine Corps is making changes that prioritise mobility and shift them away from the heavy infantry of the past and towards a high-speed raid force. To do this, the Marine Corps will divert resources away from heavy components like the infantry and towards flexible aspects such as reconnaissance.

The Corps is reducing overall manpower by 12,000 Marines. It plans to increase the Marine Infantry Course from 8 to 14 weeks so that these Marines can be more effective in raids. It has divested of three military police battalions and one regimental headquarters, bringing the total number to 7. They will get rid of 3 active and 2 reserve infantry battalions, bringing the total numbers to 21 and 6, respectively. They will also reduce the number of Marines in those battalions by about 200. They will be shifting from cannon to rocket artillery by disbanding 16 cannon batteries, for a total of 5, and adding 14 rocket batteries, for a total of 21. However, the biggest change is the dissolution of all 7 tank companies, with the expectation that the army will be the primary armour source. This is expected to free up funding to add 3 light armored reconnaissance companies for a total of 12. Assault amphibian companies will be reduced by 2, for a total of 4. The Marines will also be utilizing "stand in forces" to deploy to a combat zone before combat commences.

USMC airpower will also be changing. The Corps will reduce the number of fighters to 10 active attack fighters per squadron. The Corps will also eliminate 3 active tiltrotors squadrons, with 14 remaining, in addition to reducing heavy lift helicopter squadrons by 3, for a total of 5. They will get rid of 2 light attack helicopter squadrons for a remainder of 5. They will be adding 1 aerial refueler squadrons for a total of 4. They will also add 3 active unmanned aerial companies for a total of 6.

The Marines plan to rely on the Navy for more aircraft.

Another significant change is that the Marines are trying to modernize how they organize their logistical components. They will combine the dental and medical battalions into one Health Service Support Battalion. They will also combine the Supply and Maintenance battalions into one Material Readiness Battalion. They will combine the Transport Battalion and the Landing Support Battalion. This battalion was previously not a part of logistics. Still, into the Distribution Support Battalion as well. They will increase the amount of Combat Logistics Battalions from 15 to 18. This is done so that they are packaged in a way that is easier to manage on the fly, making the Marines able to move from place to place quicker. This will enable the fast and mobile warfare the Marines are preparing for.

=== Personnel talents ===
The Marine Corps is trying to revamp how they measure the worth of a Marine and how they use that worth. They are making some changes to how they do this. However, the most significant difference is that they will allow people in specific fields, like engineering, to skip basic training and a few ranks. This works because a man might have a degree or specific skill the Marine Corps is after. The Marine Corps gives him "lateral entry," where he skips basic and comes in as maybe a sergeant instead of a private. However, he is locked into that field and cannot move out for any reason. So, a technician with a lateral entry will not be commanding infantry Marines.

The Corps has already formed the Talent Management Strategy Group (TMX) to look after any talent management changes. They have said they will emphasize tests other than the ASVAB. They will be a virtual talent marketplace, virtual reenlistments, and virtual review boards to circumvent the paper processes.

== Criticism ==
Politico wrote in April 2022 that as many as thirty retired Marine Corps generals oppose Force Design. Several of these generals met with Marine Commandant David H. Berger on March 3, 2022, but they were not satisfied with the result of the discussion, according to retired lieutenant general Paul Van Riper. Among the critics of the plan were every living former Commandant and other notable generals, including Jim Mattis, Anthony Zinni, John Kelly, Charles Wilhelm, Terrence Dake, Walter Boomer, and Paul Van Riper. The group of retired senior Marines that opposed Force Design 2030 called itself "Chowder II," a reference to the "Chowder Society" in the late 1940s, which opposed any efforts to limit or eliminate in the Marine Corps in the years after World War II.

Force Design has been criticized by the retired generals for making the Marine Corps too focused on the Pacific at the expense of its global expeditionary capability, and for dispersing small groups of Marines on remote islands in the Pacific that would be vulnerable to Chinese attack and without a viable way of resupplying or moving them.

The advocates of Force Design have responded to these criticisms, arguing that recent events in the Russo-Ukrainian War and the Red Sea crisis demonstrate how mainly land-based forces with missiles, drones, and littoral craft can deny sea access to conventional ships, and, in the case of Ukraine, keep sea lines of communication open.
